= J. Henry Edmunds =

Pennsylvania Pilot boat

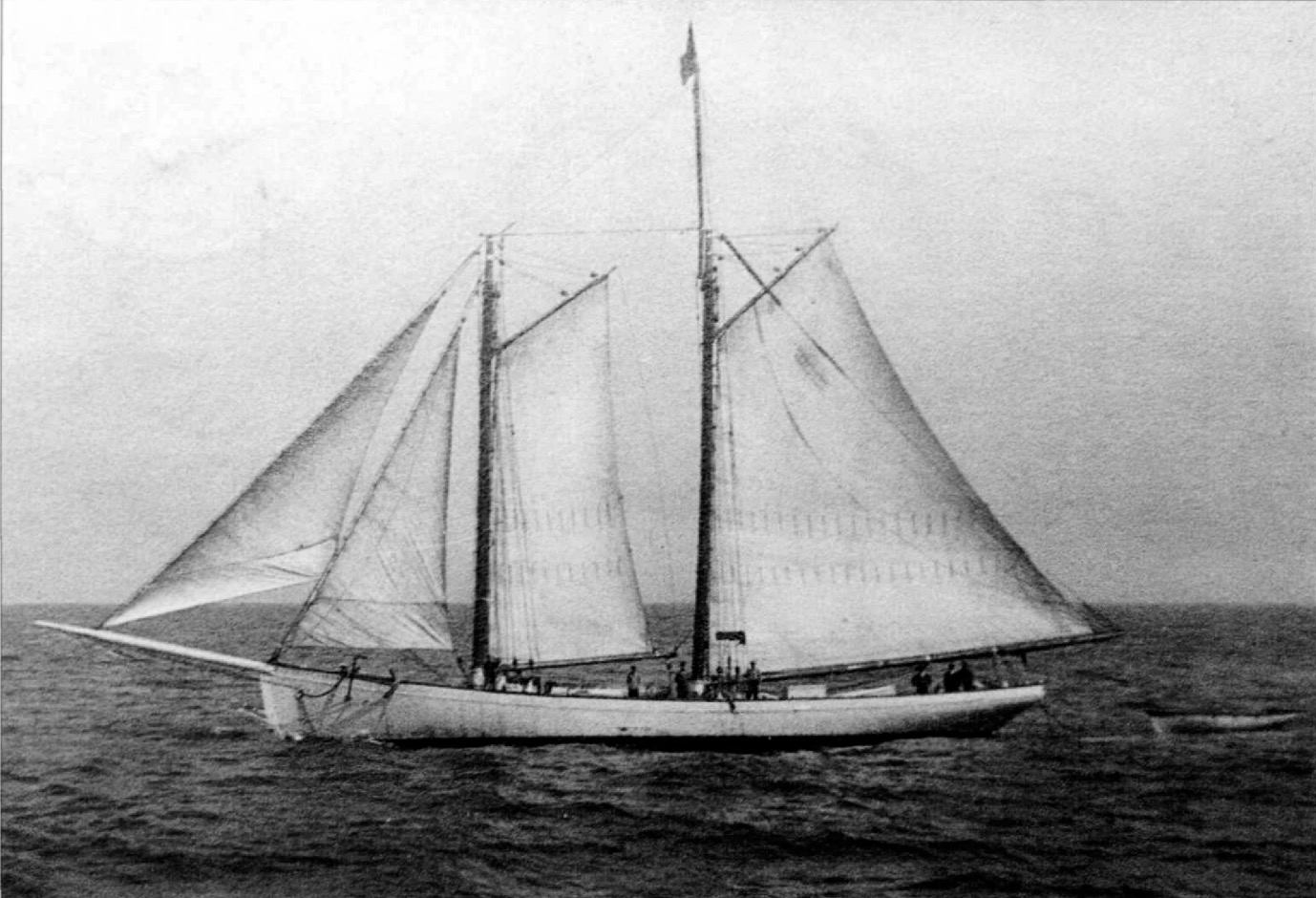
- Pilot schooner J. Henry Edmunds (1893)

History

United States
- Name: J. Henry Edmunds
- Namesake: J. Henry Edmunds, Mayor of Cape May, New Jersey
- Owner: Philadelphia Pilots
- Operator: H. Bailey (1888-1893); M. Hughes (1894-1895); Fiddler (1895-1900); Elis Eldridge (1888); Alfonso Bennett (1888)
- Builder: C. & R. Poillon
- Cost: $13,000 (1887); $16,000 (1893)
- Launched: March 1887; February 9, 1893
- Out of service: September 27, 1892; March 12, 1928
- Fate: Sank (1892); Sank (1928)

General characteristics
- Type: Schooner
- Tonnage: 56 tons
- Length: 88 ft 0 in (26.82 m)
- Beam: 22 ft 0 in (6.71 m)
- Depth: 9 ft 0 in (2.74 m)

J. Henry Edmunds was a 19th-century pilot schooner built in 1887 in Brooklyn, New York for Philadelphia pilots. She sank in 1892 and a second Edmunds was built in 1893, which lasted thirty-five years before she sank in bad weather outside Cape Henlopen in 1928. She was the last schooner-rigged pilot boat in the Delaware Bay.

== Construction and service ==
J. Henry Edmunds was a pilot schooner built in March 1887, at the C. & R. Poillon shipyard in Brooklyn, New York, for a crew of eleven Pennsylvania pilots. She was known as the No. 3 of Philadelphia fleet. The cost of the J. Henry Edmunds was $13,000.

The J. Henry Edmunds was registered as a pilot schooner with the Record of American and Foreign Shipping, from 1888 to 1993. Her ship master was Captain H. Bailey; her owners were Philadelphia pilots; built in 1887 at Brooklyn, New York (C. & R. Poillon); and her hailing port was the Port of Philadelphia. Her dimensions were 76.3 feet (23.3 m) in length; 20.5 feet (6.2 m) breadth of beam; 8.6 feet (2.6 m) depth of hold; and 56 tons tonnage.

During the Great Blizzard of 1888 the pilot boats J. Henry Edmunds and E. C. Knight were blown out to sea during the storm.

The pilot boats J. Henry Edmunds and Ebe W. Tunnell and their Cape May pilots, kept to their assigned area at the Five Fathom Bank, which was 25 miles (40 km) east of Cape Henlopen until the Pilots' Association For The Bay & River Delaware was formed on November 28, 1896. This area was ideal for boarding steamers as it was on the direct line from Europe. After the Pilots' Association was formed, many of the Delaware pilot boats were purchased or sold.

When the steamboat Pennsylvania was built in 1896, the J. Henry Edmunds was used as an auxiliary to her. The Pennsylvania was purchased by the United States Navy on May 23, 1898, from the Philadelphia Pilots' Association, she was replaced by the two remaining pilot boats the J. Henry Edmunds and Ebe W. Tunnell. In November 1899, the Philadelphia Pilots' Association placed the J. Henry Edmunds on a railway at the Jackson and Sharp Company for general overhauling and repairs.

=== Sunk by four-masted schooner ===
On September 27, 1892, J. Henry Edmunds was run down by a four-masted schooner Ralph M. Haywood of New York, twenty-five miles offshore. The J. Henry Edmunds sank near the Five Fathom Bank lightship and was a total loss. There were two pilots aboard at the time and they and the crew came on board the Ralph M. Haywood and were taken to the pilot boat John G. Whilldin, which took them to Cape May. The pilot boat was valued at $13,000 and owned by the Cape May pilots.

== The new J. Henry Edmunds ==
A new pilot boat named J. Henry Edmunds was built to replace the original ship that sank in 1892. She was launched on February 9, 1893, from C. & R. Poillon's shipyard in New York. Her cost was $16,000. The new J. Henry Edmunds was registered as a pilot schooner with the Record of American and Foreign Shipping, from 1894 to 1900. Her new ship master was Captain Hughes; her owners were Philadelphia pilots; built in 1893 in Brooklyn, New York (C. & R. Poillon); and her hailing port was the Port of Philadelphia. Her new dimensions were 85 feet (26 m) in length; 21.6 feet (6.6 m) breadth of beam; 9 feet (2.7 m) depth of hold; and 69 tons Tonnage. She was powered by a 125-horsepower (93 kW) diesel engine.

=== End of service ===
The pilot boat J. Henry Edmunds was lost on March 12, 1928, when she was grounded on the shoals of Cape Henlopen, Delaware, in dense fog and bad weather. The nose of the boat rammed into the sand. The Pilots' Association of Philadelphia, turned her over to the underwriters after failed attempts were made to pull her off the beach. She was the last schooner-rigged pilot boat in Delaware Bay. On March 24, 1928, the J. Henry Edmunds was sold at public auction by D. W. Burbage to George Shockley of Rehoboth Beach, Delaware for $350.

== See also ==
- List of Pennsylvania Pilot boats
- Pilots' Association For The Bay & River Delaware
