= Enoch Turley =

Pennsylvania Pilot boat

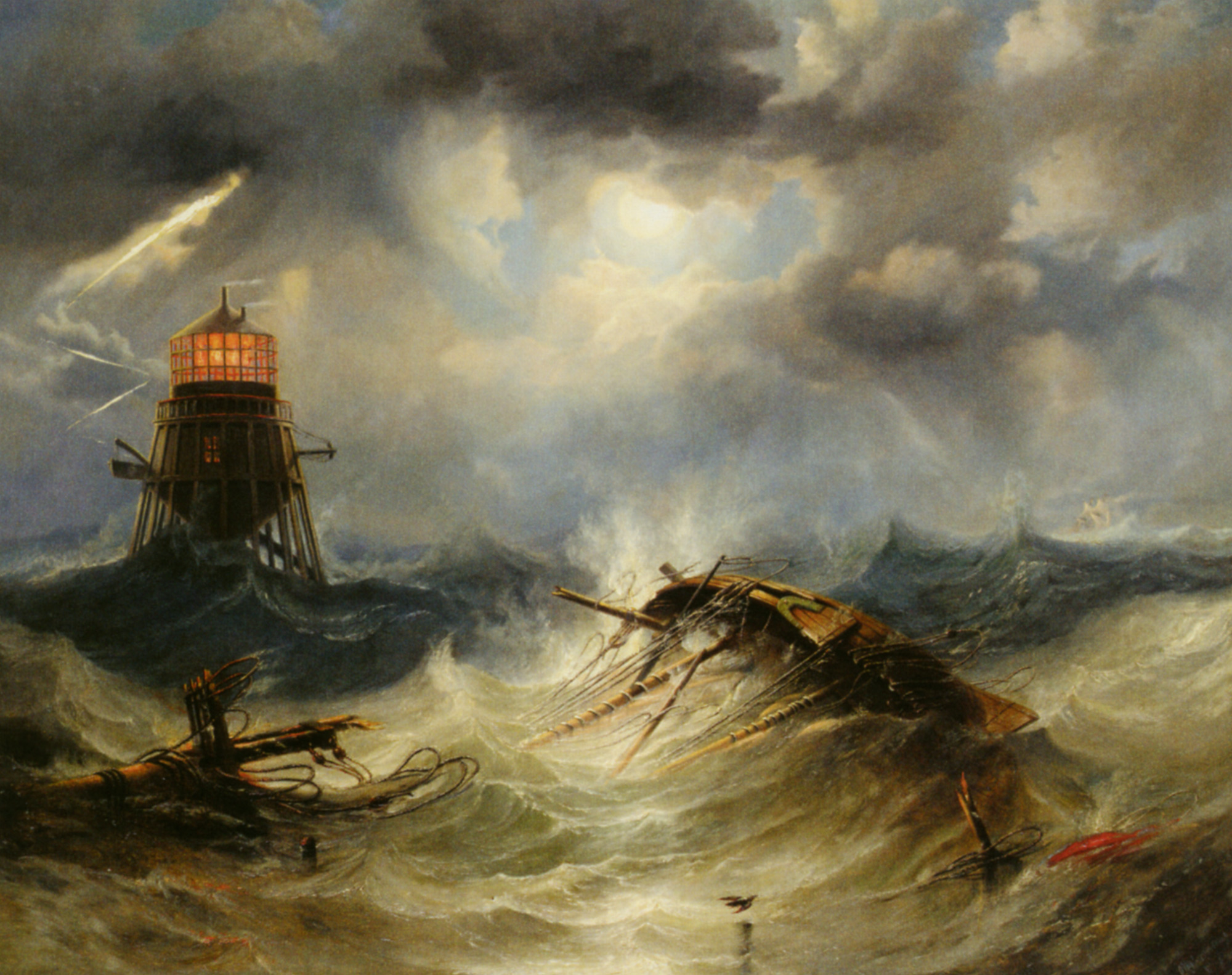
- Pilot boat Enoch Turley near the Irwin Lighthouse, Storm Raging by James Wilson Carmichael

History

United States
- Name: Enoch Turley
- Namesake: Captain Enoch Turley
- Owner: George W. Pride, Harry Long, John H. Kelley, James R. Kelley, John S. Kelly, Morgan B. Saunders, Harry M. Parker, James A. Orton, Charles D. Schellenger, Peter R. Schellenger, Luster D. Schellenger, William Edwards, John Maull, George Conwell, Gus Clampitt, George Wallace, Lew Wallace, Samuel West, John West
- Operator: Charles D. Schellenger, John S. Kelly, Morgan B. Saunders, Harry M. Parker, James A. Orton, James Clampett, Joseph Snodgrass, William Baker, John West
- Launched: November 1842
- Out of service: April 6, 1889
- Fate: Sank

General characteristics
- Class & type: Schooner
- Tonnage: 47-tons TM
- Length: 73 ft 6 in (22.40 m)
- Beam: 18 ft 8 in (5.69 m)
- Depth: 7 ft 2 in (2.18 m)
- Propulsion: Sail

The Enoch Turley was a 19th-century Pennsylvania pilot schooner built in 1842 in Baltimore, Maryland. In the 1880s she was caught up in the competition and rivalry between New Jersey and Pennsylvania pilots and the Delaware pilots. She survived the Great Blizzard of 1888, but was swept away in 1889, with all hands lost, during a powerful gale.

== Construction and service ==
The two-masted pilot boat Enoch Turley was built in Baltimore, Maryland in November 1842 for George W. Pride. She went on her first trial run on November 25, 1842. A large party were on board. She was named in honor of Captain Enoch Turley of Philadelphia, whose son, Enoch Turley Jr., was appointed harbormaster for the port of Philadelphia (1856) and later served as the president of the Society for the Relief of Poor Shipmasters. Charles D. Schellenger worked on the pilot schooner Enoch Turley. Her pilots were John Kelley, Luster D. Schellenger, James Clampett, William Edwards, Joseph Snodgrass, James A. Orton, and William Baker.

In the spring of 1843, the Enoch Turley was in a race with the pilot boat John G. Whilldin, which was from Philadelphia to the breakwater at the Delaware capes. She was in another race on September 12, 1844, with the pilot boat Herald. The boats left Southwark, Philadelphia crowded with ladies for the race and excursion. The stake was a banquet for all hands to be paid by the losing boat.

The Turley was stranded ashore near Indian River Inlet in the winter of 1843. She was raised, repaired and a new keel was replaced in the spring of 1844. She was rebuilt several times, and by Mr. Moore at Wilimington in 1862 and again by Jackson & Sharp at Wilmington in 1880. She was a favorite among Delaware pilots.

After the American Civil War, the Turley toured the Chesapeake Bay and viewed the deserted rebel fortifications and half-sunken hulks from the war. She started from Fort Monroe in Hampton, Virginia and returned to the Fort the next day.

The Enoch Turley was registered as a pilot schooner with the Record of American and Foreign Shipping from 1881 to 1885. Her owner at this time was George W. Pride; built in 1842 at Baltimore, Maryland; and her hailing port was the Port of Philadelphia. Her dimensions were 73.6 ft. in length; 18.8 ft. breadth of beam; 7.2 ft. depth of hold; and 47-tons Tonnage.

In 1882, there was competition and rivalry between New Jersey and Pennsylvania pilots and the Delaware pilots. The Delaware pilotage laws had hurt trade in the Port of Philadelphia. Because of this, on September 21, 1882, the Board of Port Wardens of Philadelphia approved a resolution to assign seven pilots, that were attached to Delaware boats, and assign them to Pennsylvania boats. There were five pilots assigned to the Cape Henlopen boats, Thomas Howard and Enoch Turley and two pilots assigned to the Cape May boats, John G. Whilldin and E. C. Knight. The resolution said that there would be no further connection with the Delaware pilots and that the Delaware pilots would not be able to board the New Jersey and Pennsylvania pilot boats. The Delaware pilots had only the pilot boats Henry C. Cope and the Thomas F. Bayard, which refused to be governed by the new rules. On August 3, 1886, the Board of Port Wardens of Philadelphia met and adopted two new resolutions that amended the September 1882 resolutions. The Pilot Commissioners of the State of Delaware declared that the pilot boat Thomas Howard would become a Delaware pilot boat. As a result, the board recognized four pilot boats, the E. C. Knight, John G. Whilldin, Enoch Turley and Christian Bergh. The Pennsylvania pilots were instructed to have the abbreviation "Penna." placed on the sail, which contained the boat number.

On February 15, 1888, John West, one of the pilots on the Pennsylvania pilot boat Enoch Turley, fell into the water trying to board the steamship Indiana. He was able to survive the ordeal. Weeks later, in the Great Blizzard of 1888, the Turley was snagged on a shoal near the Lewes breakwater where she lost her masts. The Cape Henlopen lifesavers arrived on the scene and were able to rescue all seven crewmen and their boat.

== End of service ==
The Enoch Turley was last seen by pilots on the pilot boat J. H. Edmunds on April 6, 1889, 25 miles southeast of Fenwick Island light ship. It was reported that she sank with all hands lost during a bad gale. Owners and pilots Charles D. Schellenger, John S. Kelly, Morgan B. Saunders, Harry M. Parker and James A. Orton lost their lives on the pilot boat. After the accident, the community of Lewes, Delaware created a benevolent fund of over $6,000 to aid the widows and children of the pilots.

The Turley was replaced by the pilot boat William W. Ker, which was launched on November 27, 1889, from the Jackson and Sharp yard in Philadelphia. She was named in honor of Assistant District Attorney William W. Ker. James R. Kelley from the Turley was present at the launch.

== See also ==
- List of Pennsylvania pilot boats
- Pilots' Association For The Bay & River Delaware
