= William W. Ker =

19th-century American pilot schooner

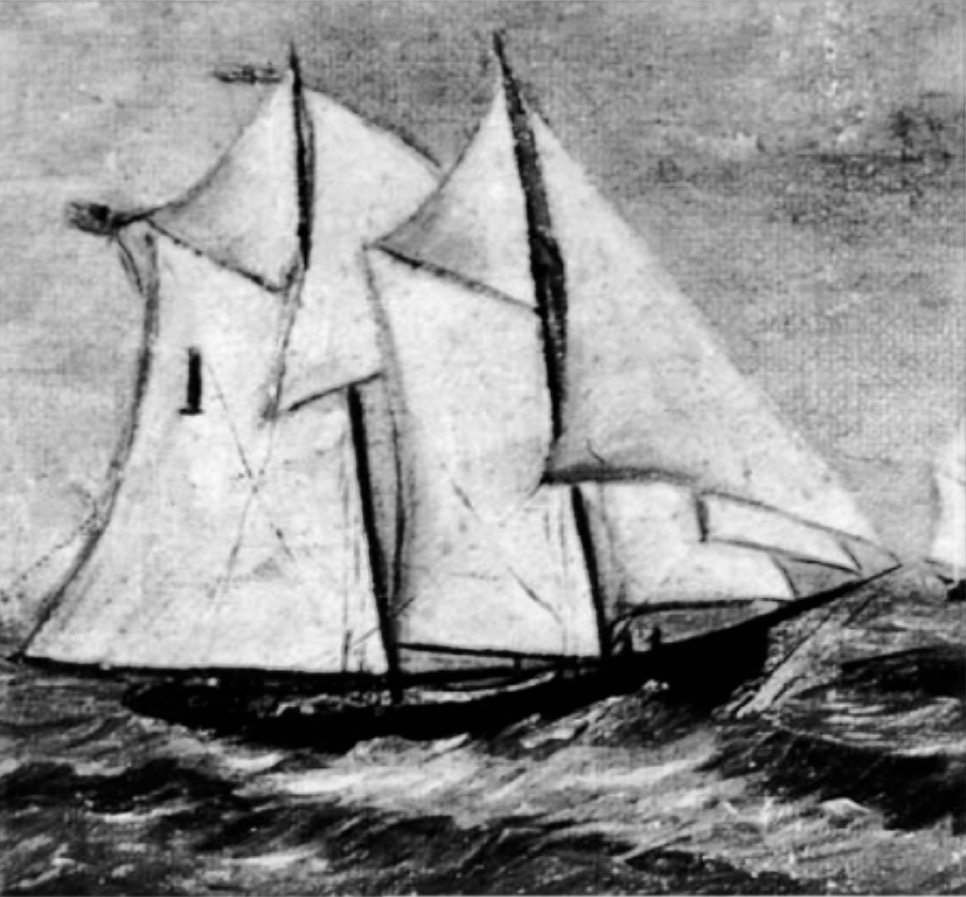
- Pilot boat William W. Ker c. 1889

History

United States
- Name: William W. Ker
- Namesake: William W. Ker
- Owner: Philadelphia Pilots' Association (1889–1898); Captain Redmond (1898–1900)
- Operator: Philadelphia Pilots (1889–1898); Captain Redmond (1898–1900)
- Builder: Jackson & Sharp Company
- Launched: November 27, 1889
- Christened: W. W. Ker
- Out of service: February 18, 1898
- Fate: Sank in 1900

General characteristics
- Type: schooner
- Length: 88 ft 0 in (26.82 m)
- Beam: 22 ft 0 in (6.71 m)
- Depth: 9 ft 0 in (2.74 m)
- Sail plan: 72 ft 0 in (21.95 m) mainmast; 64 ft 0 in (19.51 m) foremast

William W. Ker was a 19th-century Pennsylvania pilot schooner built in 1889 in Wilmington, Delaware. She was designed by Edward Burgess for the Pennsylvania pilots and was built for speed. She was a favorite with the pilots and was considered the fastest pilot boat on the coast. The William W. Ker was hit and sank by a steamer off the Five Fathom Bank in 1900.

== Construction and service ==
The two-masted pilot schooner William W. Ker was launched on November 27, 1889, from the Jackson & Sharp Company at Wilmington, Delaware for the Pennsylvania pilots. She was designed by Edward Burgess and took the place of the Enoch Turley, which was lost with all on board in an April 6, 1889 storm.

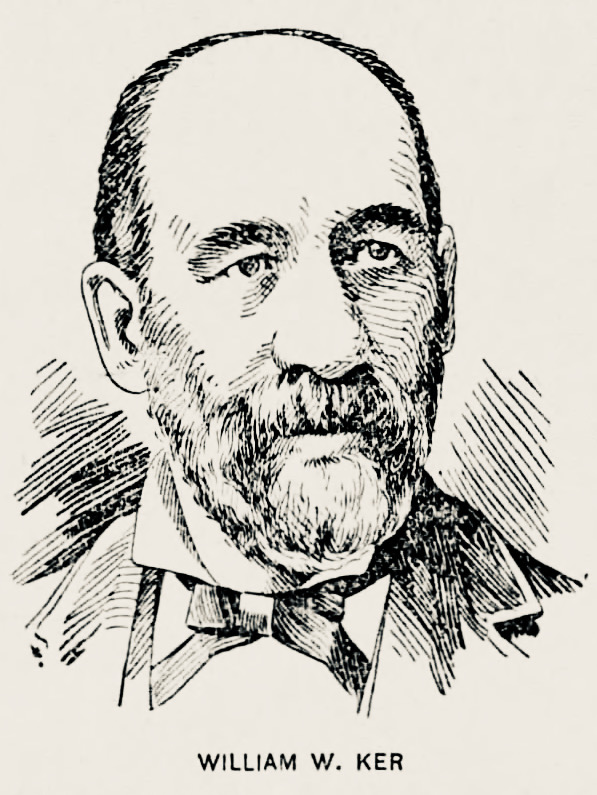
Assistant District Attorney William W. Ker

The William W. Ker was named in honor of the Assistant District Attorney of Philadelphia Captain William W. Ker.

Pilot James R. Kelley from the Enoch Turley was present at the launch. A bottle of champagne was broken on her bow by Mary Conner, a granddaughter of pilot George H. Conner. As she broke the bottle she said: "I christen thee W. W. Ker." The vessel's dimensions were 88 feet (27 m) in length; 22 feet (6.7 m) breadth of beam; 9 feet (2.7 m) depth of hold; 72 feet (22 m) mainmast and 64 feet (20 m) foremast. She was built for speed.

By August 1893, the Committee on Navigation and Pilots of the Board of Port Wardens recognized only four pilot boats for the Port of Philadelphia, the E. C. Knight, John G. Whilldin, William W. Ker and J. Henry Edmunds.

On 19 March 1897, the William W. Ker and John G. Whilldin cruised near the Fenwick Island Light vessel, waiting to board ships coming from the Caribbean. She was a favorite with the pilots and was considered the fastest pilot boat on the coast.

== End of service ==
On February 18, 1898, due to the introduction of steam service at the Delaware Breakwater, the schooner William W. Ker was bought from the Philadelphia pilots to Captain Redman for mackerel fishing. The William W. Ker would often fish on the banks off Cape Henlopen.

On June 27, 1900, she was hit and sank by a steamer off the Five Fathom Bank by one of the old Dominion Line steamers, the Hamilton, bound from New York to Norfolk, Virginia. Captain Redmond of New York was in command of the William K. Ker when she went down. Sixteen men were rescued and taken to Norfolk.

== See also ==
- List of Pennsylvania Pilot boats
- Pilots' Association For The Bay & River Delaware
