= United States lightship Barnegat (LV-79) =

Lightvessel in New Jersey

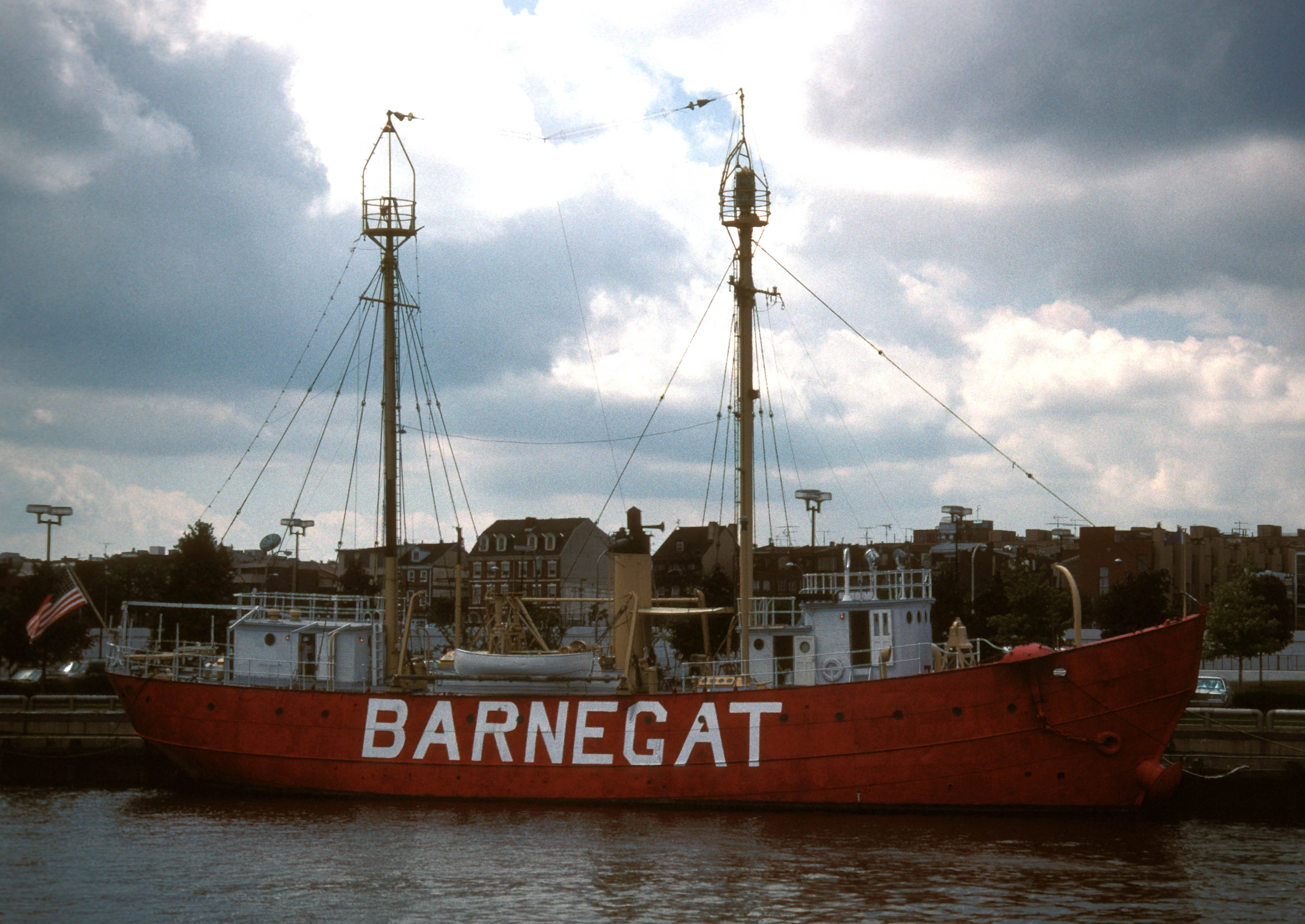
- The lightship Barnegat in Philadelphia

History

United States
- Name: Barnegat
- Operator: U.S. Coast Guard
- Builder: New York Shipbuilding Company
- Cost: $89,030
- Launched: 1904; 122 years ago
- In service: 1904; 122 years ago
- Out of service: 1967; 59 years ago
- Status: Moored at Pyne Poynt Marina in Camden, New Jersey

General characteristics
- Displacement: 668 tons
- Length: 129 ft (39 m)
- Beam: 28.6 ft (8.7 m)
- Draft: 12.6 ft (3.8 m)
- Propulsion: Steam-one compound surface condensing engine, 16" and 31" bores x 24" stroke, 325 IEP; 2 boilers 9'3" dia x 164" long, 100 psi; propeller 79" dia; also rigged for sail initially
- Speed: 10 knots (19 km/h)
- Barnegat
- U.S. National Register of Historic Places
- New Jersey Register of Historic Places
- Location within Camden County, New Jersey Location within New Jersey Location within the United States
- Location: North 7th Street, Camden, New Jersey
- Coordinates: 39°57′21″N 75°6′46″W
- Area: 0.3 acres (0.12 ha)
- Built: 1904
- Architect: New York Ship Building and Dry Dock Company
- NRHP reference No.: 79002317
- NJRHP No.
- Added to NRHP: 29 November 1979

The United States lightship Barnegat (LV-79/WAL-506), is located in Camden, Camden County, New Jersey, United States. The lightship was built in 1904 and was added to the National Register of Historic Places on 29 November 1979.

== History ==
Barnegat was built in 1904 by the New York Shipbuilding Company in Camden. The vessel served from 1904 to 1924 as the lightship for Five Fathom Bank, which is located 15 miles (24 km) from the Cape May Lighthouse. The vessel was then used as a relief for the next two years. In 1927 the vessel was assigned to the Barnegat Lighthouse station. In 1942 the vessel was withdrawn from the Barnegat station to serve as an examination vessel at Edgemoor, Delaware. Barnegat would inspect all vessels entering the Delaware River until 1945. The vessel returned to the Barnegat station, where it served until it was decommissioned on 3 March 1967. Barnegat was then donated to the Chesapeake Bay Maritime Museum in Saint Michaels, Maryland. The museum was unable to keep up with the maintenance of the vessel and sold the vessel to the Philadelphia Ship Preservation Guild in 1970 to be displayed at Penn's Landing.

== Status ==
Barnegat is now docked at Pyne Poynt Marina in Camden. Attempts at maintenance and repair work were unsuccessful and the ship is considered to be in threat of loss due to deterioration. In early 2020, the Barnegat Light Historical Society purchased and removed the ship's bell from the deck with hopes of restoring and eventually displaying the bell somewhere in the vicinity of Barnegat Light. In June 2020, the restored bell was unveiled and put on permanent display at the Seventh Street bay side pavilion park in Barnegat Light.

== See also ==
- National Register of Historic Places listings in Camden County, New Jersey
- List of museum ships
