= Lightship =

Ship that functions as a lighthouse

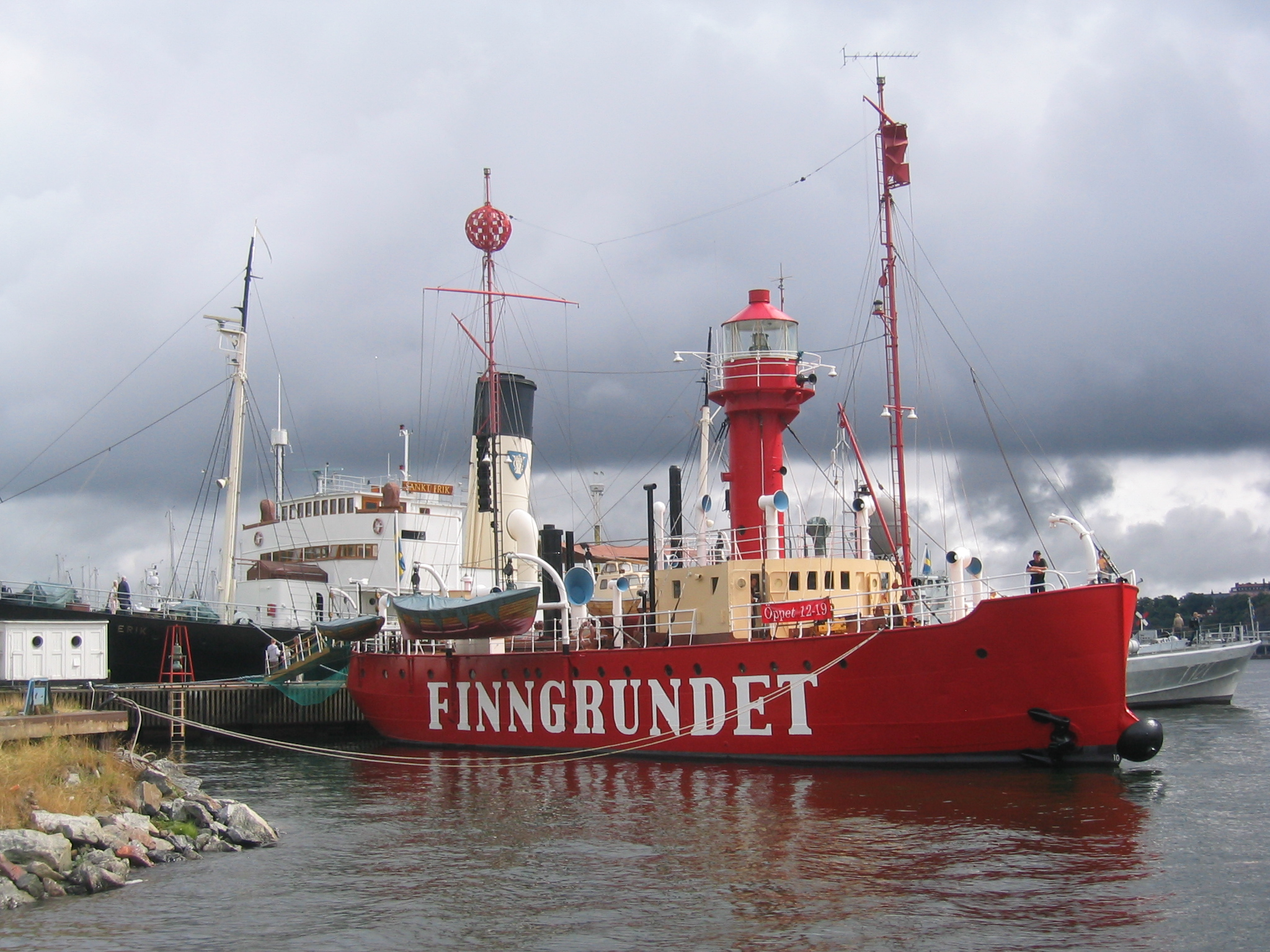
Lightship Finngrundet, now a museum ship in Stockholm. The day markers can be seen on the masts.

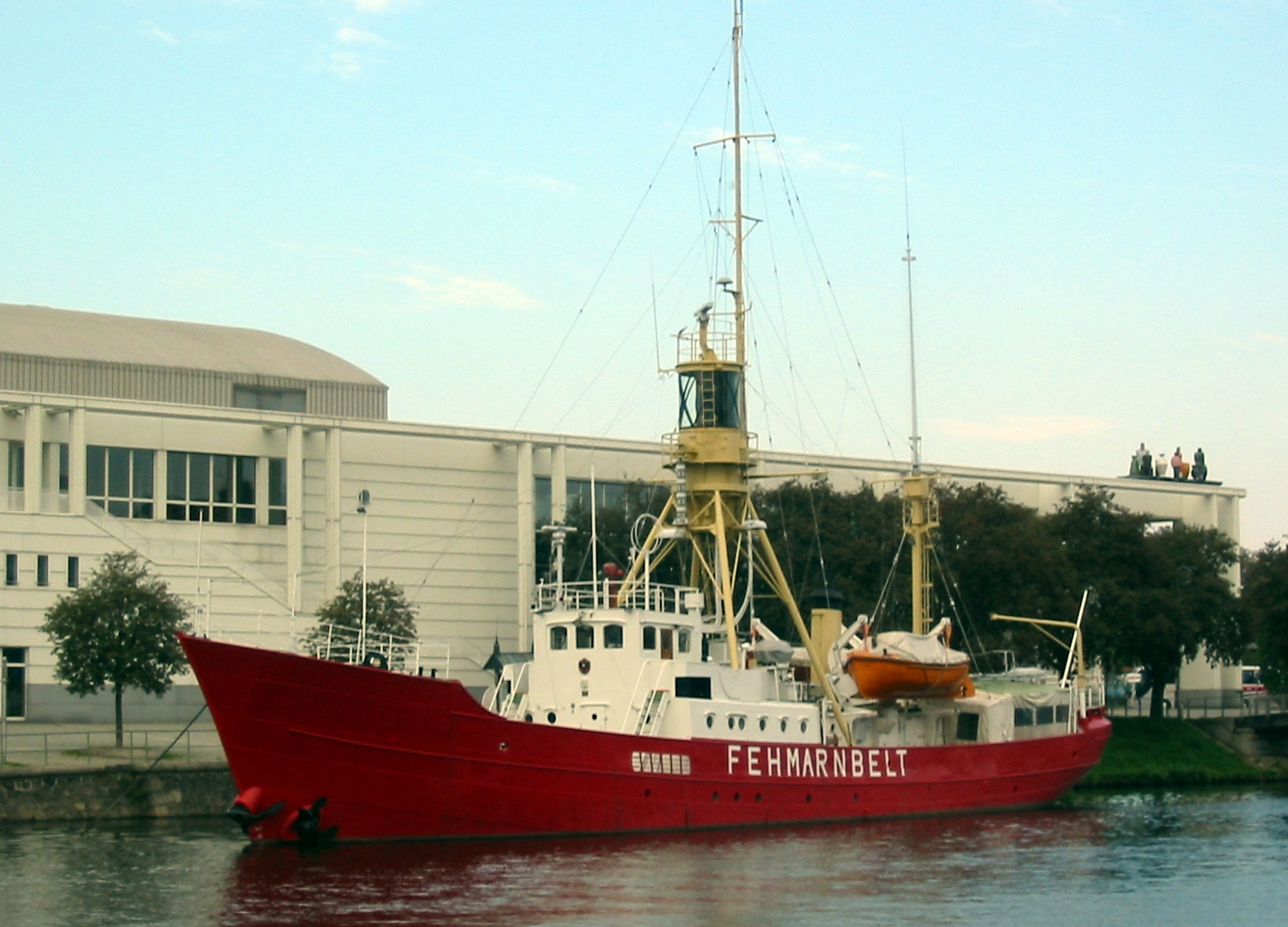
Fehmarnbelt Lightship, now a museum ship in Lübeck

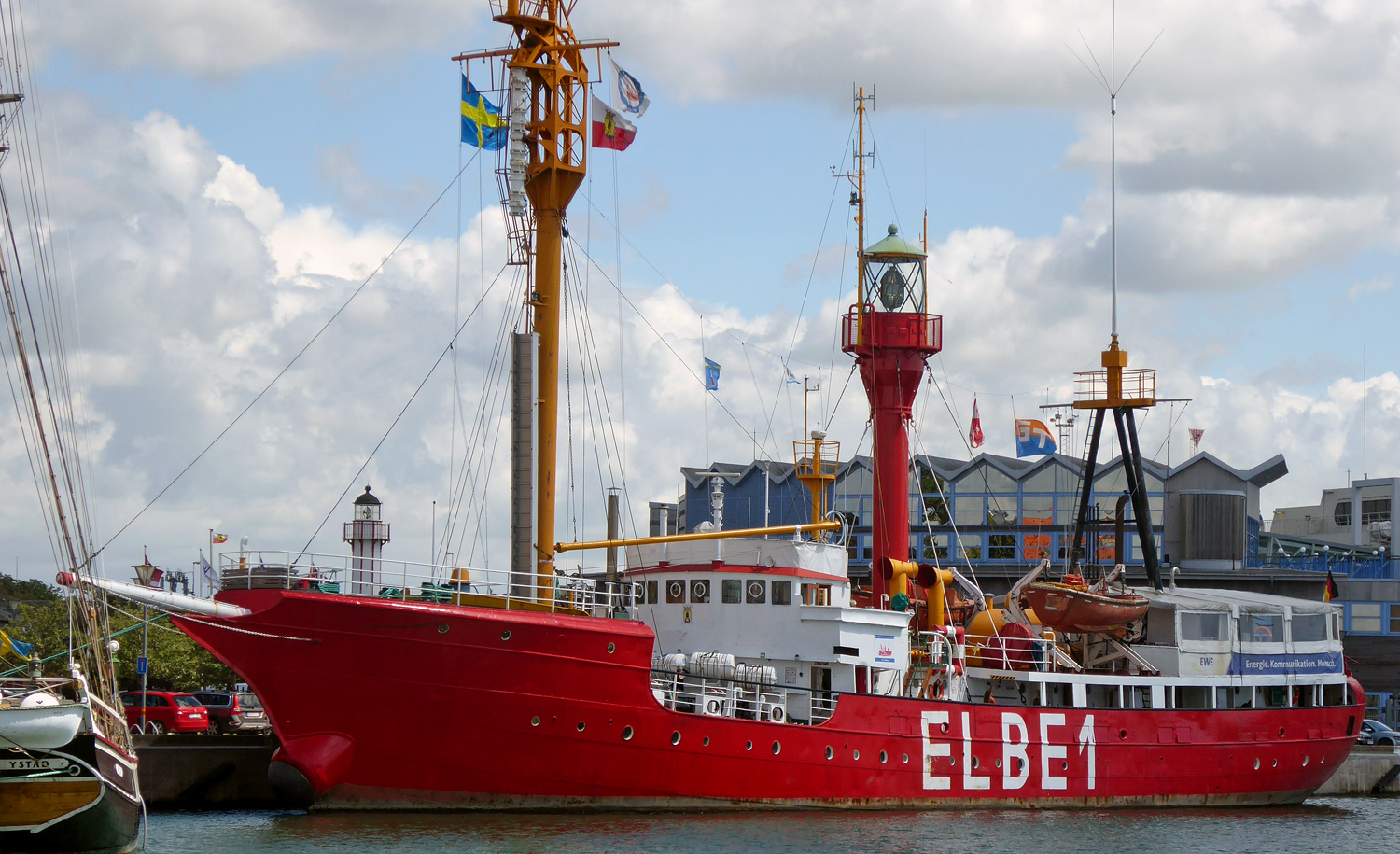
Bürgermeister O´Swald II was the world's largest manned lightship, the last lightship at position Elbe 1. In the picture on a visit to Ystad 12 July 2017.

A lightvessel, or lightship, is a ship that acts as a lighthouse in areas deemed unsuitable for proper lighthouse construction. Although some records exist of fire beacons being placed on ships in Roman times, the first modern lightship was invented by Robert Hamblin in 1734 and was located off the Nore sandbank at the mouth of the River Thames in London, England. Lightships have since been rendered obsolete in some parts of the world by advancing lighthouse construction techniques, and by large automated navigation buoys (LANBY).

== Construction ==
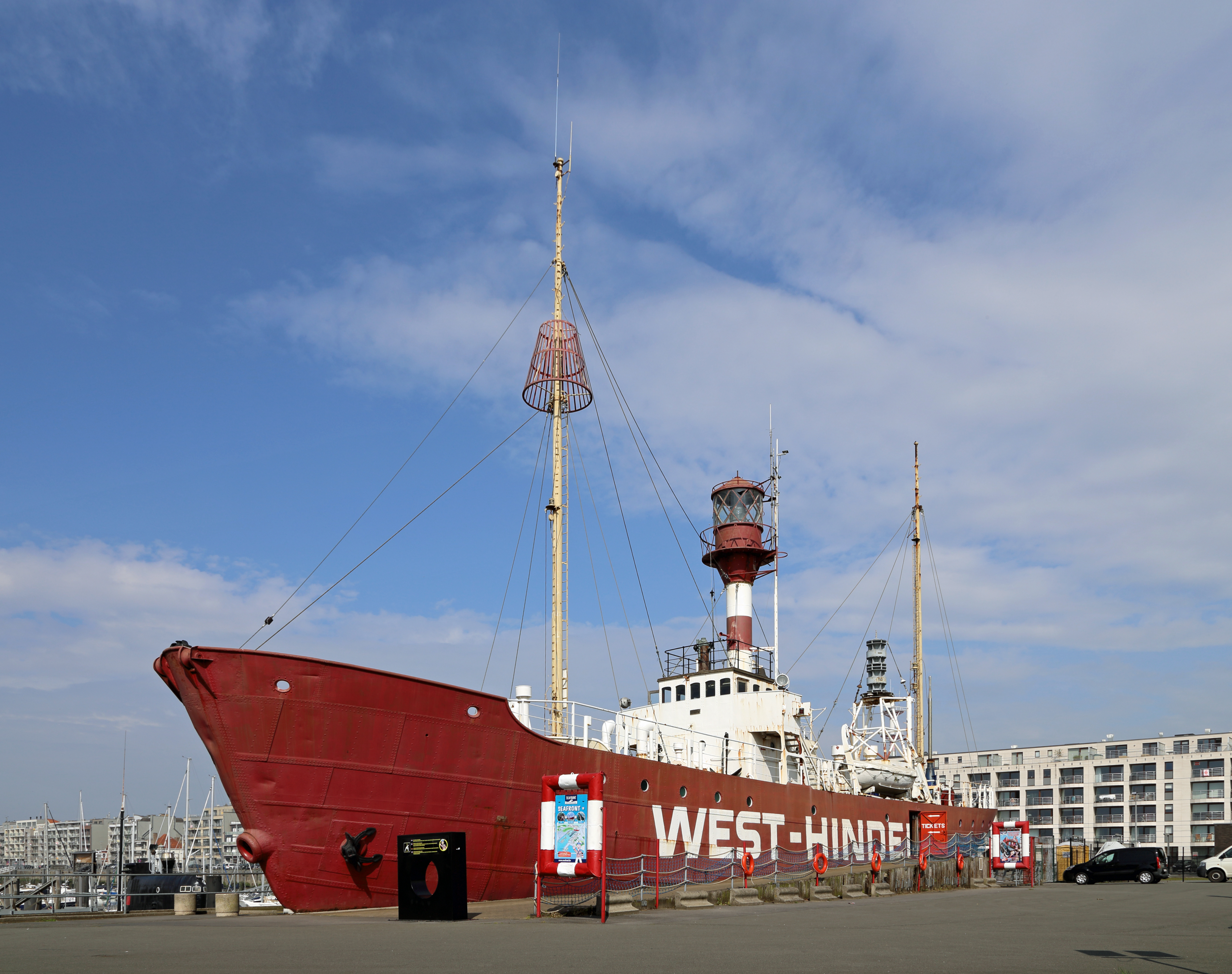
Former Belgian lightship West-Hinder II, now a museum ship in Zeebrugge

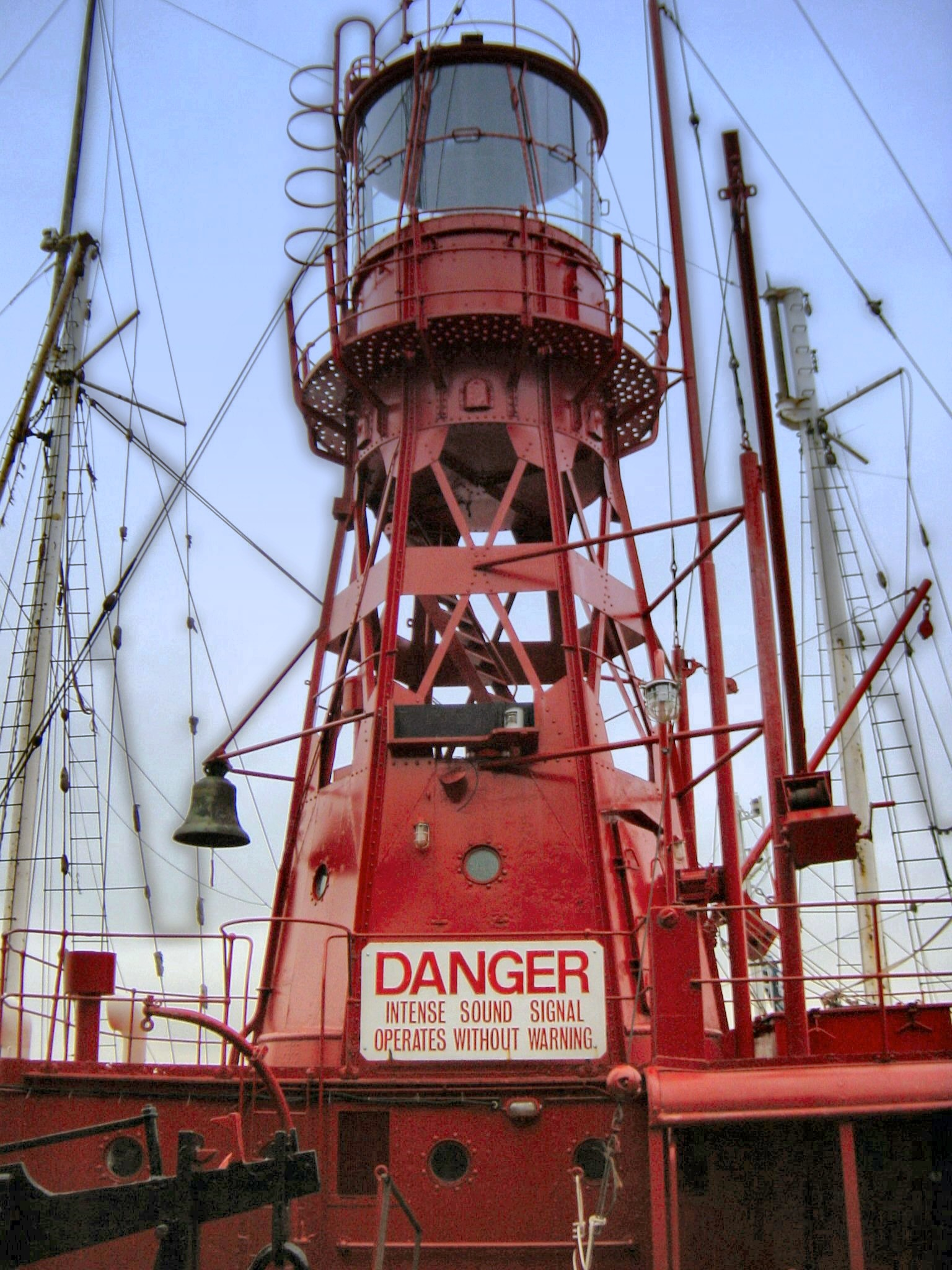
Some lightships, like this one in Amsterdam, were also equipped with foghorns.

The most important element of lightship design is a tall mast upon which to mount the light. Initially, these lights consisted of oil lamps that were run up the mast and could be lowered for servicing, while later vessels carried fixed lamps which were serviced in place. As they became available, Fresnel lenses were used, and many vessels housed them in smaller versions of lighthouse lanterns. Some lightships had two masts, with the second housing a reserve beacon in case of the main light's failure.

Initially, lightship hulls were constructed of wood, shaped like the small merchant ships of the time. However, this proved unsatisfactory for a permanently anchored ship, so the shape of the hull evolved to reduce rolling and pounding. As iron and steel hulls were popularized, they became used in lightvessels, and the advent of steam and diesel power led to self-propelled and electrically lit designs. Earlier vessels had no propulsion systems and had to be towed to and from their positions.

Much of the ship was taken up by storage for lamp oil and other supplies, as well as crew accommodation. The crew's primary duty was to maintain the light. Additional responsibilities included keeping records of passing ships, observing the weather, and occasionally performing rescues.

In the early 20th century, some lightships were fitted with warning bells mounted on their structure or lowered into the water to warn of danger in poor visibility and to permit a crude estimation of the lightship's location relative to the approaching vessel. Tests conducted by Trinity House found that sound from a bell submerged some 18 feet (5.5 m) could be heard at a distance of 15 miles (24 km), with a practical range in operational conditions of one to three miles (1.6 to 4.8 km).

=== Mooring ===
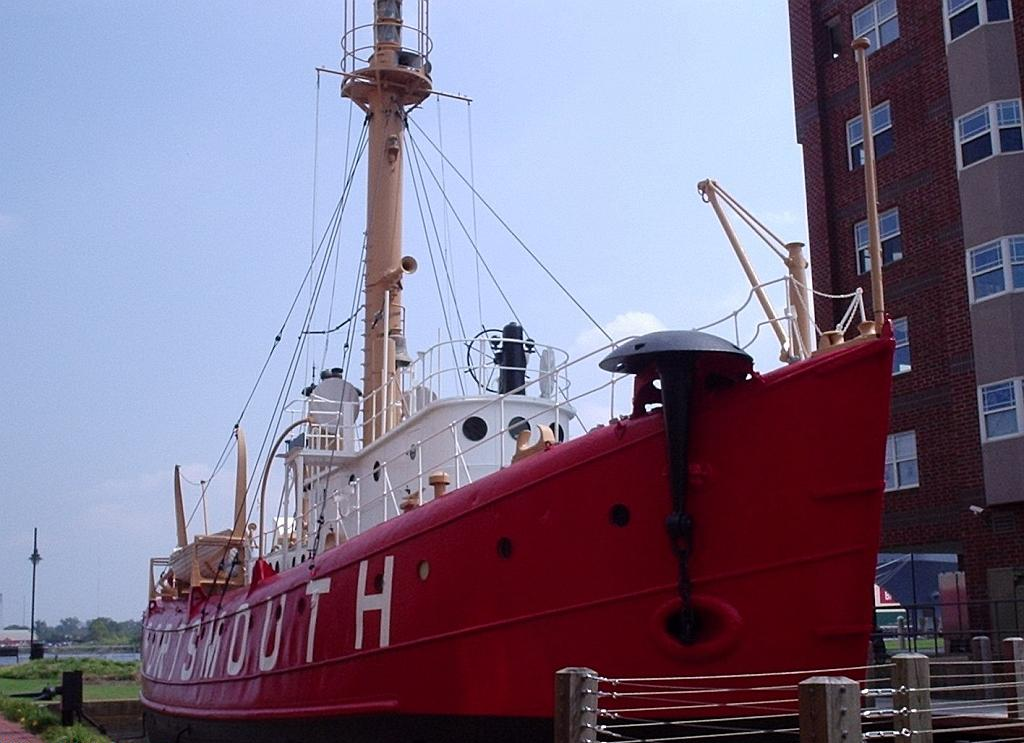
Lightship Portsmouth (LV-101) shows its mushroom anchor. It can be seen at downtown Portsmouth, Virginia, and is a part of the Naval Shipyard Museum.

Holding the vessel in position was an important aspect of lightvessel engineering. Early lightships used fluke anchors, which are still in use on many contemporary vessels, though these anchors are prone to dragging, making their performance unsatisfactory in rough seas.

Since the early 19th century, lightships have used mushroom anchors, named for their shape, which typically weigh 3 to 4 tons. The first lightvessel equipped with one was a converted fishing boat, renamed Pharos, meaning lighthouse, which entered service on September 15th, 1807, near Inchcape, Scotland with an anchor weighing 1.5 tons. The introduction of cast iron anchor chains in the 1820s improved their effectiveness dramatically, with the rule of thumb being 6 feet (1.8 m) of chain for every foot of water.

=== Appearance ===
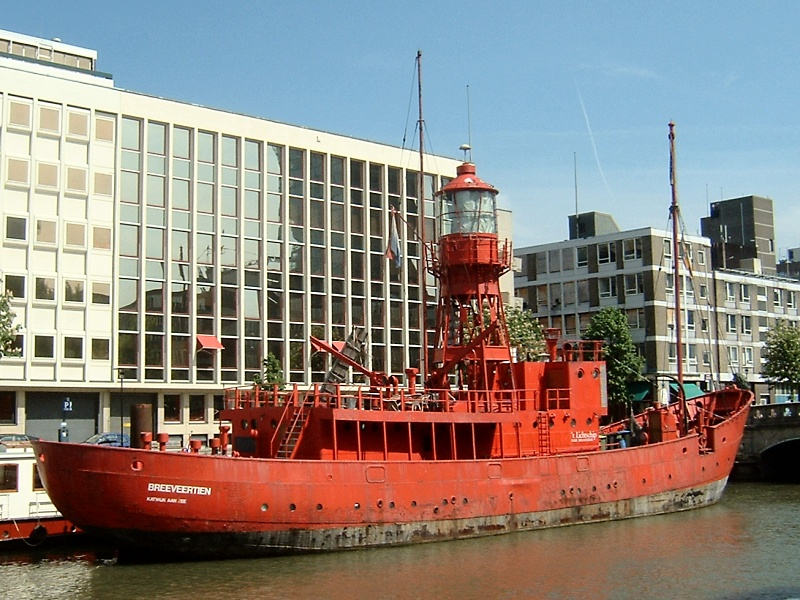
LV-11 (originally British lightship Trinity House) is docked in Rotterdam, Netherlands, as Breeveertien serving as a restaurant

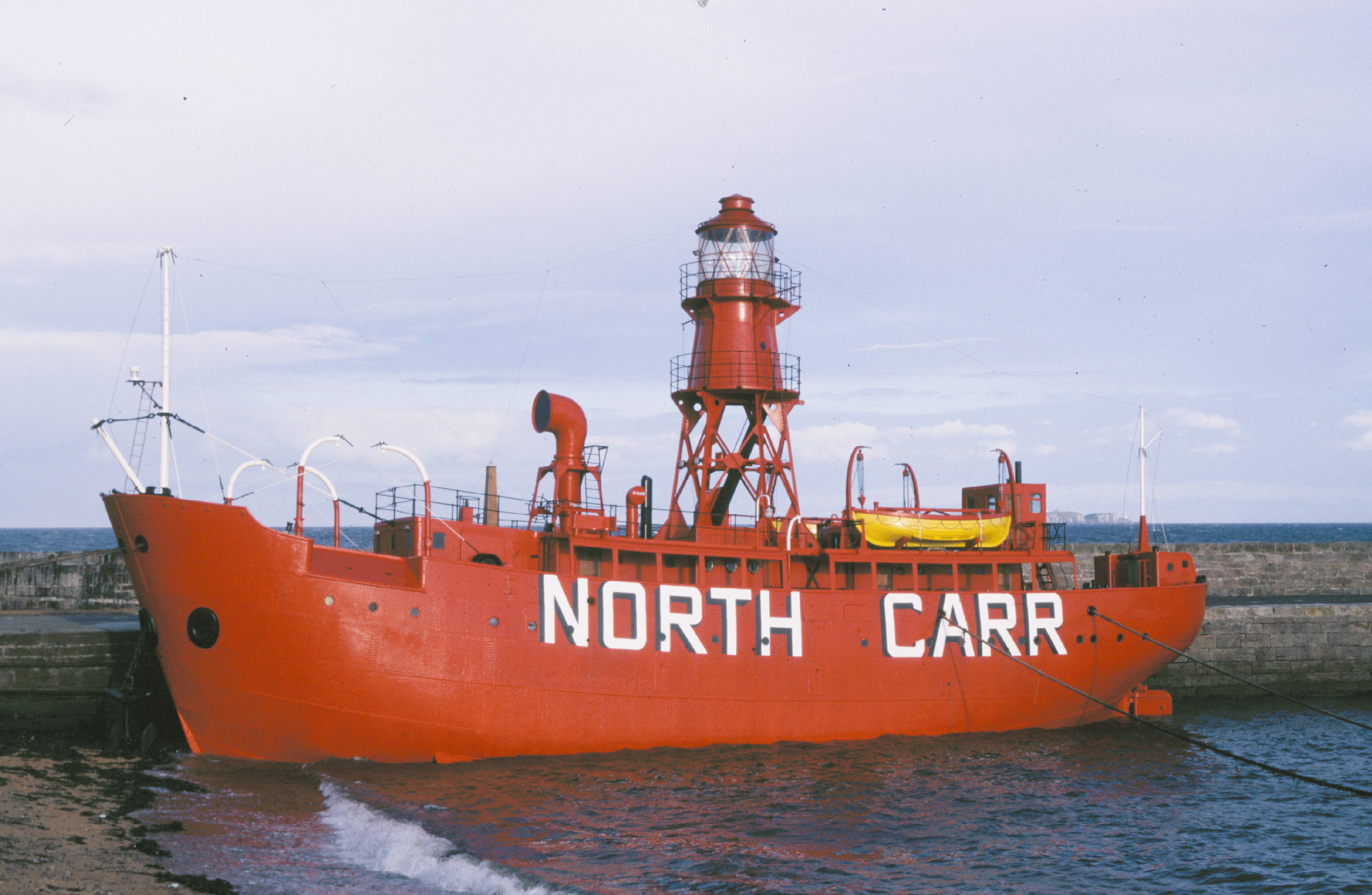
The North Carr Lightship showing a large foghorn

Early lightvessels were equipped with day markers at the tops of their masts, which were the first objects seen from an approaching ship. These operated both at night and in fog, from one hour before sunset to one hour after sunrise and were in addition to the lights. The markers were primarily red and occasionally white, and their designs varied. Filled circles or globes, as well as pairs of inverted cones, were the most common designs among them.

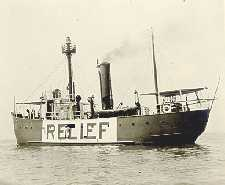
United States lightship Huron circa 1922

For visibility purposes, most later lightships had bright red hulls that displayed the name of the station in white, upper-case letters; relief light vessels displayed the word RELIEF instead. Some vessels had hulls colored for specific purposes. For example, the Huron Lightship was painted black since she was assigned the black buoy side of the entrance to the Lake Huron Cut. From 1854 until 1860, the lightvessel that operated at Minots Ledge, Massachusetts, had a light-yellow hull to increase contrast between the blue-green seas and the hills behind it.

== Lightvessel service ==
=== British lightships ===
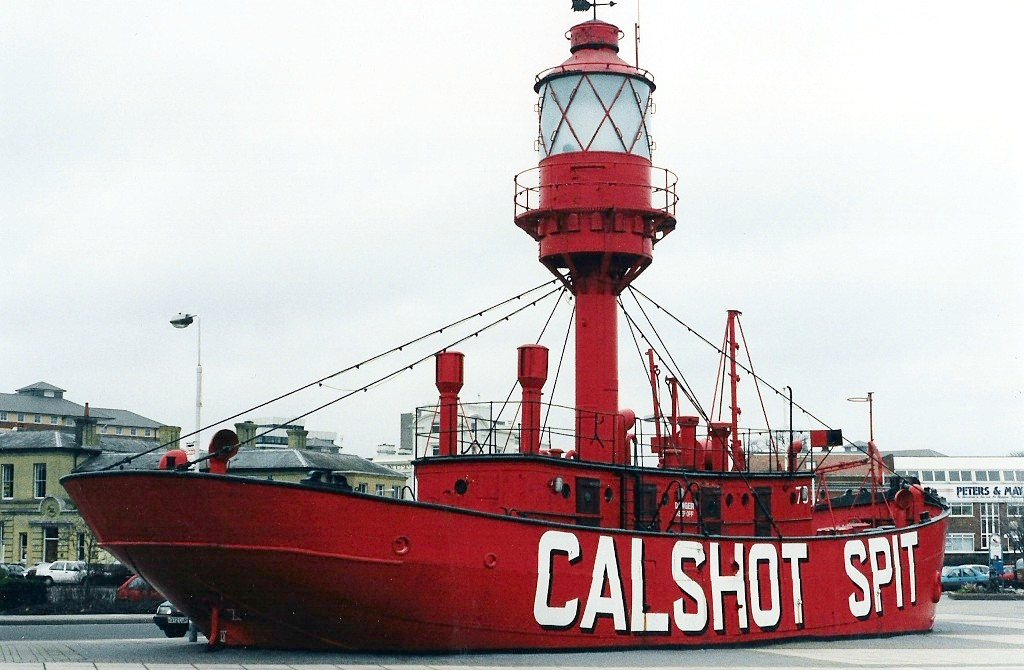
Calshot Spit lightship on display at the Ocean Village marina, Southampton. The ship has since been moved to the Solent Sky museum, also in Southampton.

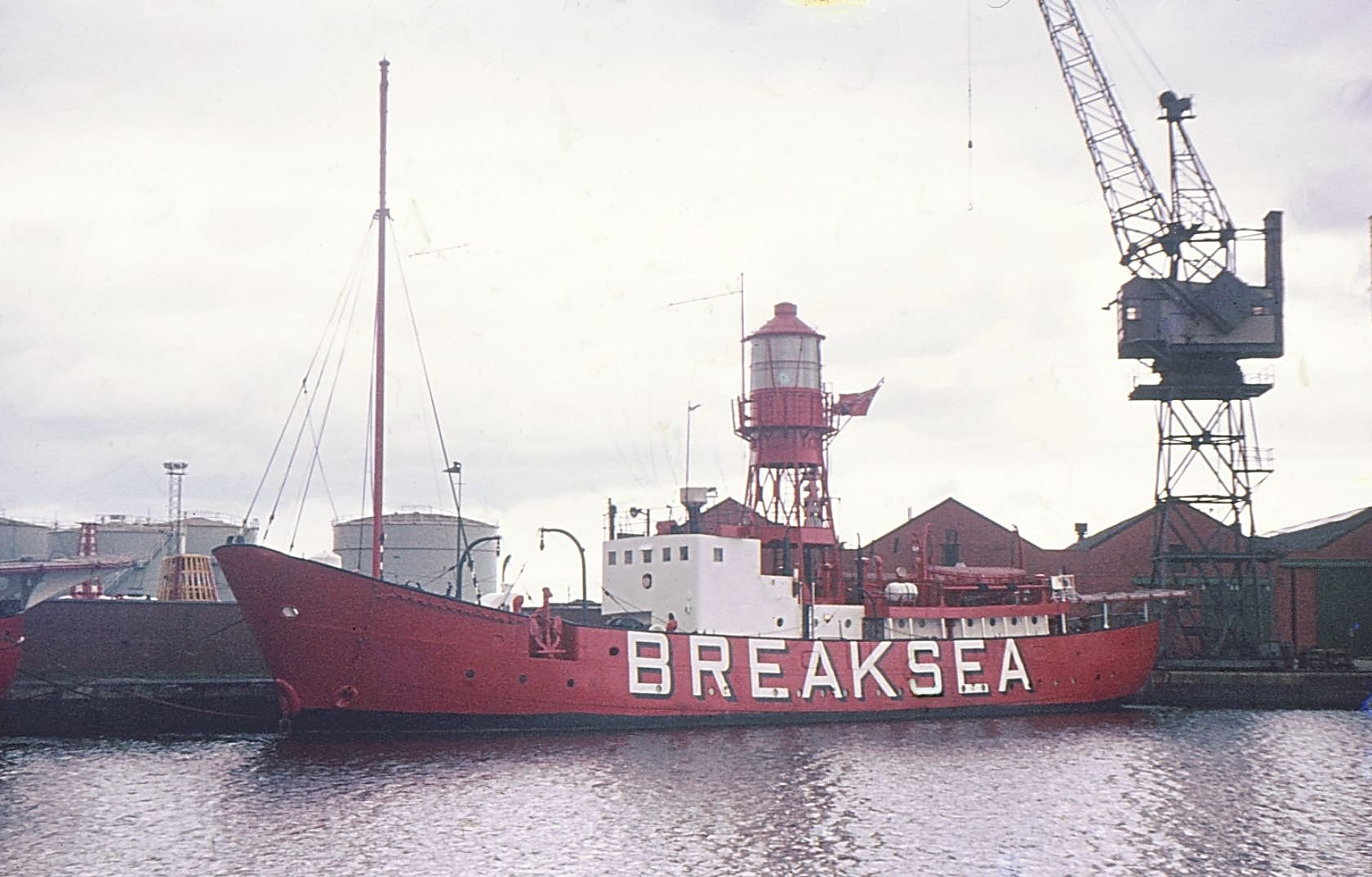
Breaksea Light Vessel following a refit at Swansea in 1978.

In 1731, David Avery and Robert Hamblin placed the earliest British lightship at The Nore near the mouth of the River Thames. This was a private venture that operated profitably and without the need for government enforcement of payment for lighting services.

Further vessels were placed off Norfolk in 1736, at Owers Bank in Sussex in 1788, and at the Goodwin Sands in 1793.

Over time, Trinity House, the public authority charged with establishing and maintaining lighthouses in England and Wales, displaced the private light vessels. Trinity House is now responsible for all the remaining lightvessels in England and Wales, of which there are currently eight unmanned lightvessels and two smaller light floats.

In the 1930s, "crewless lightships" were proposed as a way to operate a light vessel for six to twelve months without a crew.

The first lightvessel conversion to solar power was made in 1995, and all vessels except the '20 class' have now been converted. The '20 class' is a slightly larger type of vessel that derives its power from diesel electric generators. Where a main light with a visible range in excess of 20 nautical miles (37 km) is required, a '20 class' vessel is used, as the main light from a Trinity House solar lightvessel has a maximum range of 19 nautical miles (35 km).

Hull numbers: 19, 22, 23 and 25 (the 20 class); 2, 5, 6, 7, 9, 10, 17 (solar lightvessels); and LF2 and LF3 (solar light floats).

The Spurn Lightship, operated by the Humber Conservancy Board, was launched in 1927 and served for 48 years. It is now preserved as a museum ship and is moored at Hull marina.

=== American lightships ===
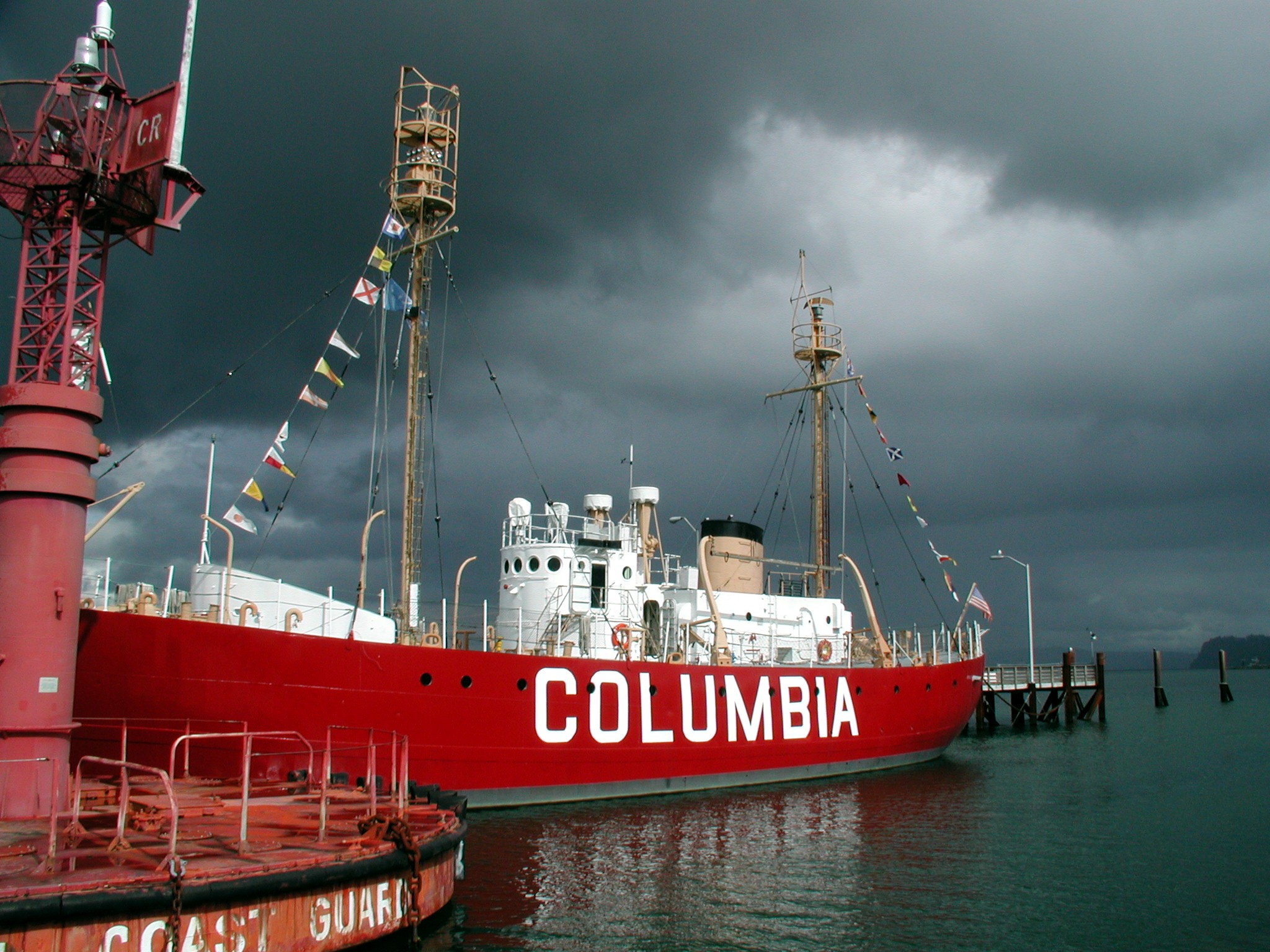
Lightship Columbia, WLV-604

==== History ====
The first United States lightship was established at Chesapeake Bay in 1820, and the total number around the coast peaked in 1909 with 56 locations marked. Of those ships, 168 were constructed by the United States Lighthouse Service and six by the United States Coast Guard, which absorbed it in 1939. From 1820 until 1983, there were 179 lightships built for the U.S. government, and they were assigned to 116 separate light stations on four coasts (including the Great Lakes).

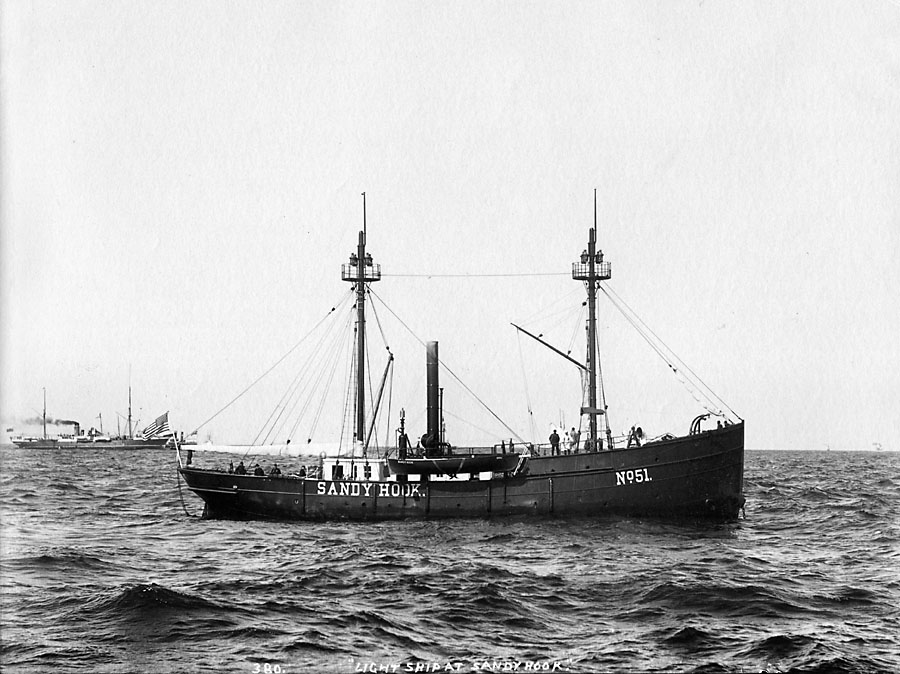
Lightship #51 at Sandy Hook, New Jersey, as it appeared in the 1890s.

The first United States lightships were small wooden vessels without any propelling power. The first United States iron-hulled lightship was stationed at Merrill's Shell Bank, Louisiana, in 1847. Wood was still the preferred building material at the time due to its lower cost and ability to withstand shock loading. Wooden lightships often survived more than 50 years in northern waters, where the danger of rotting was reduced. Lightvessel 16 guarded Sandy Hook and Ambrose stations for more than 80 years; she had both an inner hull and an outer hull with the space between was filled with salt to harden the wood and reduce decay. Several lightships built with composite wood and steel hulls in 1897 proved less durable than either wood or steel. The first modern steel lightship in United States service was lightvessel 44 built in 1882. One of the last United States wooden hulled lightships built, lightvessel 74, went into service at Portland, Maine, in 1902. The first United States lightships with steam engine propulsion were built in 1891 for service on the Great Lakes where seasonal ice required prompt evacuation of light stations to avoid destruction of the lightships.

The official use of lightships in the United States ended on March 29, 1985, when the United States Coast Guard decommissioned its last such ship, the Nantucket I. Many lightships were replaced with Texas Towers or large navigational buoys – both of which are cheaper to operate than lightvessels. In fact, lighthouses often replaced lightships.

==== Naming and numbering ====
Up to and through the Civil War lightships were identified by name, usually that of the station where they served, but as they were moved from station to station, the keeping of records became confusing. In 1867 all existing lightships were given numbers by which they would be permanently identified, and the station at which they were presently serving was painted on their sides, to be changed as needed. Lightships held in reserve to serve in place of those in dock for maintenance were labeled "RELIEF". Surviving lightships are commonly taken to be named according to these labels, but for instance the "Lightship Chesapeake" actually served at two other stations as well as being used for examinations, and last served at the Delaware Light Station. In another case, the LV-114 was labeled "NEW BEDFORD", though there has never been such a station. In an attempt to sort out the early lightships, they were assigned one or two letter designations sometime around 1930; these identifications do not appear in early records, and they are to some degree uncertain.

There are three different and overlapping series of hull numbers. The Lighthouse Service assigned numbers beginning with "LV-" and starting from 1; however, not all numbers were used. When the Coast Guard took over the lighthouse service, all existing lightships were renumbered with "WAL-" prefixes, beginning with "WAL-501". In 1965 they were renumbered again, this time with "WLV-"; however in this case the numbers given were not sequential. Given that only six vessels were constructed after the Coast Guard takeover, the "LV-" series numbers are most commonly used.

==== Surviving American lightships ====
It is estimated that there are 15 United States lightships left today. Among them:

- The lightship Barnegat (LV-79) is moored in Camden, New Jersey. She was the lightship for Five Fathom Bank and Barnegat, New Jersey.
- The lightship Swiftsure (LV-83) is moored at Northwest Seaport in Seattle, Washington. She served at all five Pacific Coast lightship stations (Blunts Reef and San Francisco, California; and the Columbia River entrance, Umatilla Reef, and Swiftsure Bank, Washington).
- The lightship Ambrose (LV-87) is moored at the South Street Seaport Museum in New York City, New York.
- The lightship Portsmouth (LV-101)) is moored at the naval shipyard museum in Portsmouth, Virginia. LV-101 was built in 1915 by Pusey & Jones. She first served at Cape Charles, Virginia, then Relief, Overfalls, Delaware, and Stonehorse Shoal, Massachusetts. After being decommissioned, she was stored in Portland, Maine, before being sold to the museum. Today LV-101 is dry docked and lettered as Portsmouth, having never served there.
- The lightship Huron (LV-103) is one of many that have plied the waters of the Great Lakes. In 1832 the first Lightship on the Great Lakes—the Lois McLain—was placed at Waugoshance Shoal. After 1940, the Huron was the last lightship on the Great Lakes. She was decommissioned in 1970 and grounded at Port Huron, Michigan as a museum. The smallest surviving lightship, she is now a museum and a representative of the 96 foot class.
- The lightship Winter Quarter (LV-107) is moored at Liberty Landing Marina in Jersey City, New Jersey. She serves as the office building for a sailing school.
- The lightship Nantucket (LV-112) is moored in Boston, Massachusetts.
- The lightship Frying Pan (LV-115) is moored at Pier 66 in New York City, New York.
- The lightship Chesapeake (LV-116) is moored at Historic Ships in Baltimore in Baltimore, Maryland.
- The lightship Overfalls (LV-118) is moored in Lewes, Delaware. She has been painted for the "OVERFALLS" station, though she never served there.
- The lightship Columbia (WLV-604) is moored at the Columbia River Maritime Museum in Astoria, Oregon. The first lightship on the Pacific Coast, she marked the entrance to the Columbia River.
- The lightship Relief (WLV-605) is moored at Jack London Square in Oakland, California.
- The lightship Nantucket I (WLV-612) is moored in New Bedford, Massachusetts. She operates as a floating hotel and events venue. Built in 1950 and operated at various stations from 1951 to 1983, she was designated Nantucket I in 1979 and rotated at the Nantucket station with the Nantucket II until 1983. She was the last American lightship to be decommissioned in 1985.
- The lightship Nantucket II (WLV-613) is moored in New Bedford, Massachusetts. She was the last lightship built in the United States and was laid down on February 4, 1952, at the Coast Guard Yard in Curtis Bay, Maryland. She was launched six months later and placed in service in September of the same year. Her first assignment was to the Ambrose Shoals off New York City and served at that station until 1967. After brief service as a relief lightship, she was assigned as one of two Nantucket lightships and served at that station until replaced by a buoy on December 20, 1983. She was moored at the Wareham Shipyard in Wareham, Massachusetts from about 1990 until 2014.

=== German lightships ===
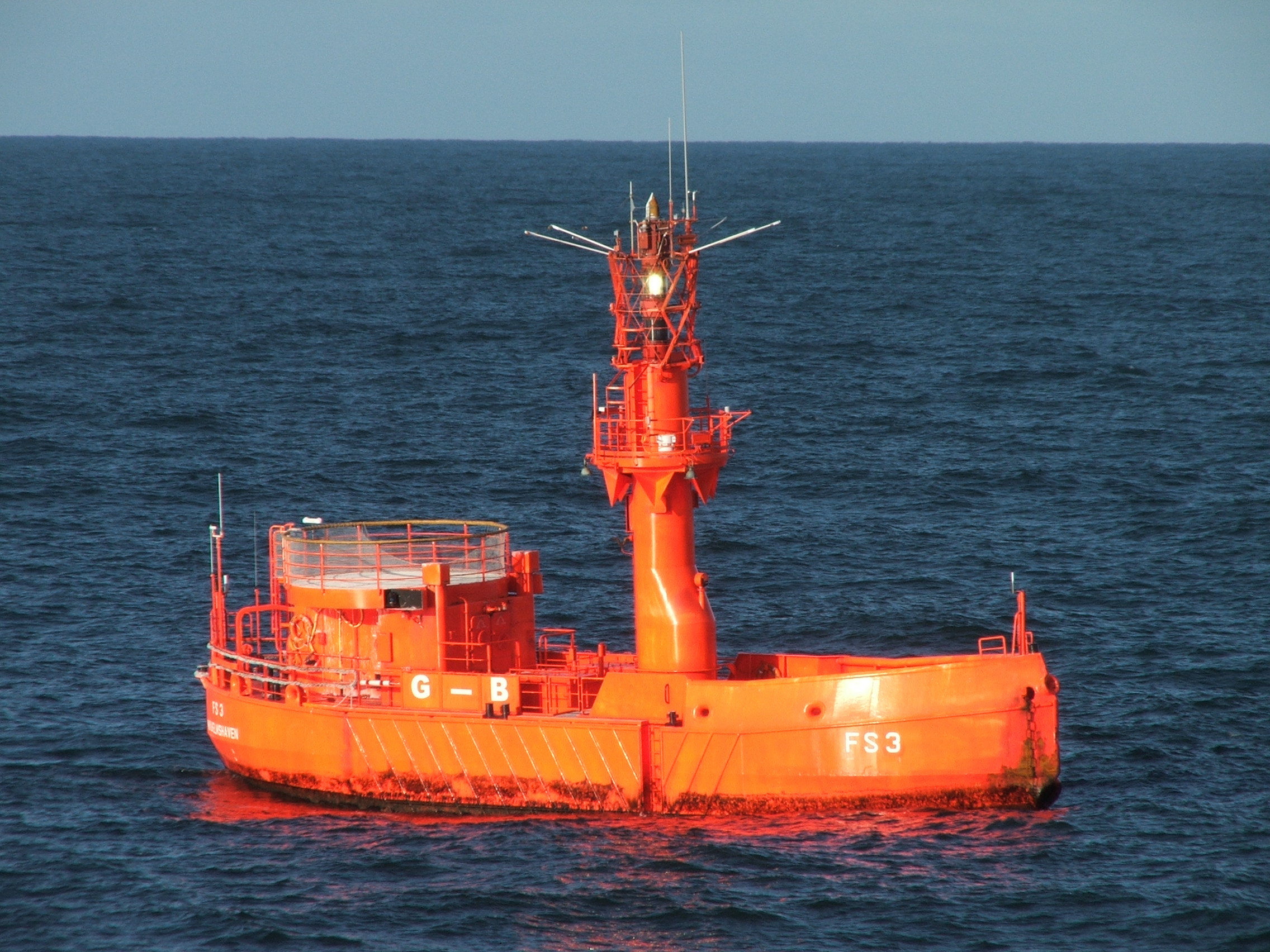
FS3 at position German Bight

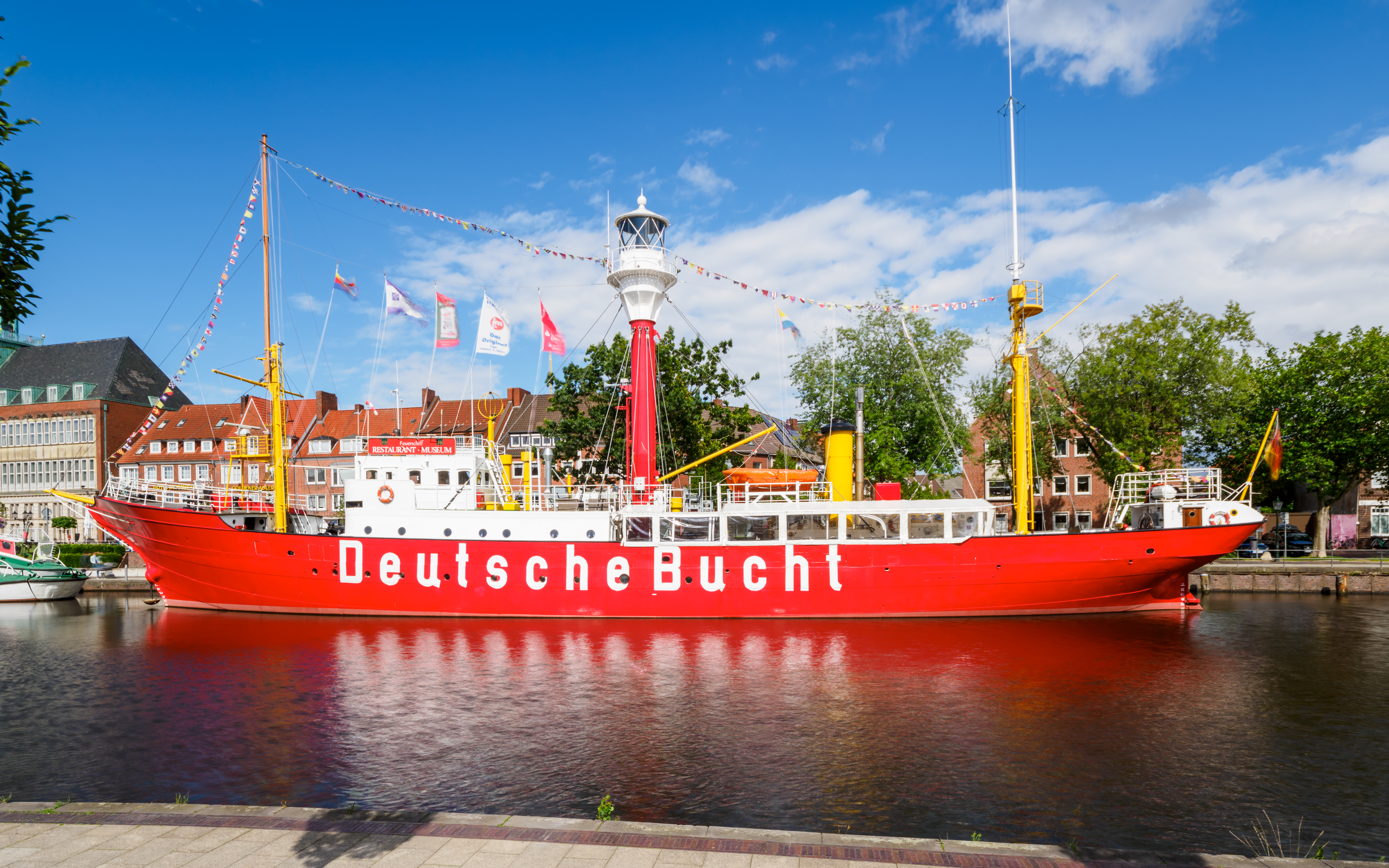
Historic lightvessel in Emden

There are currently three identical unmanned German lightvessels in service, named FS1, FS3 and FS4. The initialism FS is short for Feuerschiff, which means lightvessel in German. Two of them are normally located at:

1. 54°10.8′N 007°27.5′E German Bight (GB in charts and notices, G—B on vessels)
2. 54°09.9′N 006°20.7′E German Bight Western Approach (GW/EMS)

Both positions have the same characteristics:

- white isophase light with a cycle period of 8s at 12m elevation and a range of 17 nautical miles
- foghorn with morse code R and 30s cycle period
- radar beacon with Morse code T

All three ships are operated by the Waterways and Shipping Office Wilhelmshaven and can be seen in the harbor of Wilhelmshaven during maintenance.

=== Russian lightships ===
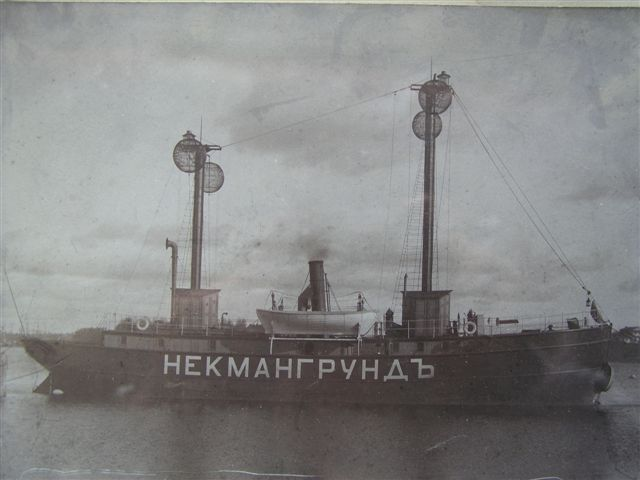
Lightship Nekmangrund (1898)

In Russia, lightships have been documented since the mid 19th century. The lightvessel service was subordinated to the Russian Hydrographic Office and most of the lightships under it were in the Baltic Sea. In the early 1900s there were about ten lightships in the Russian sector of the Baltics. Among these the following may be mentioned:

Yelaginsky, located on the Yelagin Channel – later moved to the Petrovsky Channel and renamed, Nevsky in the middle of the main channel to St. Petersburg, and Londonsky on Londonsky Shoal off Kotlin Island on the approach to Kronstadt. Other Baltic lightships were located further to the West, with Werkommatala by Primorsk (Koivisto) harbour, Lyserortsky at the entrance of the Gulf of Finland, and Nekmangrund over the treacherous shoals off Hiiumaa Island's NW shore, known as Hiiu Madal in Estonian.

Another well-known lightship was Irbensky of the Soviet Union era. It was the next-to-last Russian lightship. Having been located in the Baltic in the 1980s, it was briefly renamed Ventspilssky while serving near Ventspils port in the Latvian Socialist Soviet Republic.

The last Russian lightvessel in service was Astrakhansky-priyomniy, of the same class as Irbensky. Until 1997 she was marking the deep-water channel leading to Astrakhan harbor while it was doing service in the Caspian Sea.

=== Other countries ===
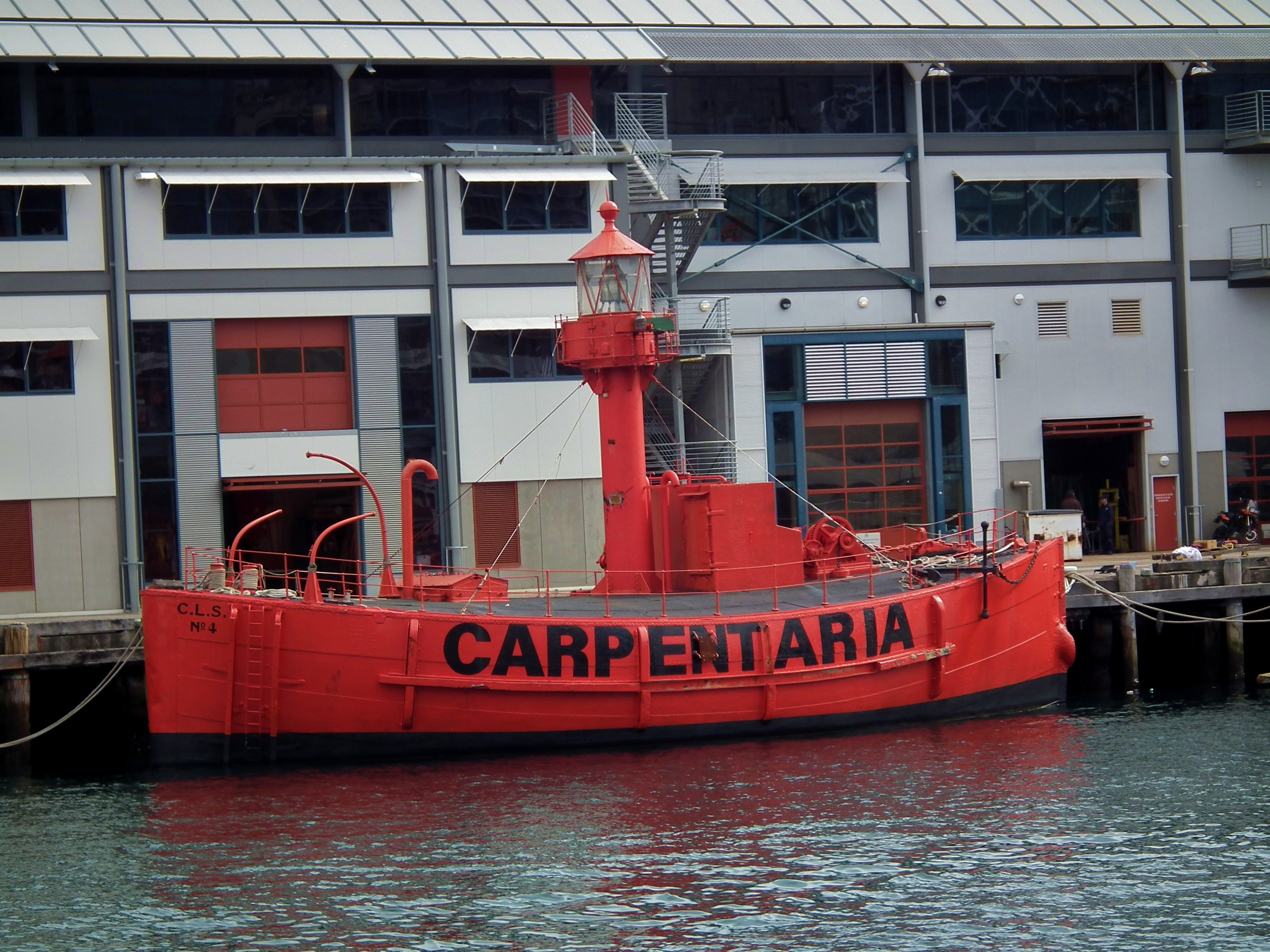
Lightship CLS4 Carpentaria at wharf close to the ANMM, Sydney

- The Australian lightship Carpentaria, an unmanned lightvessel (effectively a floating lighthouse) built during 1916–17 in Sydney, operated in the Gulf of Carpentaria, off Sandy Cape, Queensland, and in the Bass Strait. After her career ended in 1985, she was donated to the Australian National Maritime Museum in 1987 for preservation.

== Lost lightships ==
Because lightvessels must remain anchored in specific positions for the majority of their time at sea, they are more at risk of damage or destruction. Many lightships have been lost in hurricanes.

United States

- Lightship No. 84 (135 feet (41 m) long, weighing 683 tons), lies sunk since 1997 in a shallow section of New York Harbor and its two masts are still visible above the surface.
- Lightship LV-82 Buffalo foundered in Lake Erie near Buffalo, during the Great Lakes Storm of 1913 with the loss of six lives. See Shipwrecks of the 1913 Great Lakes storm and List of victims of the 1913 Great Lakes storm.
- Lightship No. 61 "Corsica Shoals" was destroyed in the same storm on Lake Huron as Lightship 82. See Huron Lightship for further details.
- LV-6 and LV-73 were both lost with all hands.
- The Nantucket Lightship LV-117 was rammed and sunk in 1934 by RMS Olympic homing in on its radio beacon, with a loss of seven out of a crew of eleven.
- Lightship No. 114 (WAL-536), built by Albina Engine & Machine Works, served as an active lightship from 1930 to 1971. Her last assignment was at Portland, Maine. In 1975, she was purchased by the city of New Bedford, Massachusetts and had "NEW BEDFORD" painted on her sides (despite the fact there never was a New Bedford lightship). She was never adequately maintained and her hull decayed due to years of neglect. She remained in New Bedford until she sank at her mooring on May 31, 2006. She was deemed beyond repair and was sold for scrap.

== Popular culture ==
- J. A. Froude, influential English historian, in 1884 famously used the metaphor of lightships cut from their moorings and freely adrift to describe the thrilling uncertainty of industrial and cultural revolution.
- Lightship, a 1934 novel by Archie Binns.
- Men of the Lightship, a 1940 British propaganda film produced during World War II.
- The Lightship, a translation of the 1960 short story Das Feuerschiff by Siegfried Lenz.
- The Lightship, a 1963 West German film adapted from the Lenz novel, with James Robertson Justice.
- The Lightship, a 1985 film adapted from the Lenz novel, with Robert Duvall and Klaus Maria Brandauer.
- Lillie Lightship: A fictional lightship from the children's television series TUGS.
- Lightship, a 2007 children's picture book by Brian Floca. A Richard Jackson Book: Atheneum Books for Young Readers. Simon & Schuster Children's Books A Junior Library Guild Selection. ISBN 1-4169-2436-1.

== See also ==
- Lists of lighthouses
- Lists of lightvessels
- Lighthouse tender
