= USS New Berne =

Gunboat of the United States Navy

History

United States
- Name: USS New Berne
- Namesake: Battle of New Berne
- Ordered: as United States
- Builder: C. & R. Poillon shipyard
- Laid down: date unknown
- Launched: July 1, 1862
- Acquired: 27 June 1863 at New York City
- Commissioned: 15 August 1863 at New York City
- Decommissioned: 29 March 1868
- Fate: Transferred to the U.S. War Department 1 December 1868

General characteristics
- Type: Steamship
- Displacement: 948 tons
- Length: 195 ft (59 m)
- Beam: 32 ft (9.8 m)
- Draft: 13 ft 6 in (4.11 m)
- Depth of hold: 12 ft (3.7 m)
- Propulsion: steam engine; screw-propelled
- Sail plan: Brigantine
- Speed: 13 knots
- Complement: 92
- Armament: 2x 30-pounder Parrott rifle; 4x 24-pounder guns; 1x 12-pounder rifle

USS New Berne was a wooden-hulled, propeller-driven steamer acquired by the Union Navy during the American Civil War.

She served the Navy primarily as a supply ship but, as a Union ship of the blockade of the waterways of the Confederate States of American, she was also responsible to take on the role of a gunboat when the opportunity presented itself.

== Construction and launch ==
New Berne was built at the C. & R. Poillon shipyard at the foot of Bridge Street in Brooklyn, New York. She was launched on July 1, 1862 as United States. She was purchased by the Navy for $136,800 from Wakeman, Dimon & Co. on June 27, 1863. She was commission as USS New Berne at New York Navy Yard 15 August 1863, Acting Vol. Lt. Thomas A. Harris in command.

She was rigged as a brigantine and could sail when winds were favorable, but her primary propulsion was provided by a steam-powered single propeller. New Berne had two steam engines which worked together to turn the propeller. Each had a single cylinder with a 36 inches (0.91 m) bore and a 36 inches (0.91 m) piston stroke. There was one boiler with two coal-fired furnaces to produce steam for the engines. New Berne's steam engines and related machinery was produced by the DeLamter Iron Works of New York City.

Her armament was upgraded throughout the Civil War. Upon entering Navy service, she was fitted with 2 24-pounder smoothbore guns and 2 12-pounder rifles. In August 1863 her battery was increased to 1 30-pounder Parrott rifle, 4 24-pounder smoothbore guns, and 1 12-pounder rifle. In July 1864, a second 30-pounder Parrott rifle was added.

== Civil War service ==
=== Assigned to the North Atlantic blockade ===
Designated a supply ship, New Berne departed New York 1 September 1863 to join the North Atlantic Blockading Squadron. For the remainder of the war, she carried mail, supplies, officers, and seamen from Northern ports to and from the ships and stations of her squadron.

=== In pursuit of Confederate blockade runners ===
From time to time her performance of this vital but unspectacular duty was enlivened by pursuit of a blockade runner. She departed Newport News, Virginia, before dawn 11 December hunting a "steamer burning soft coal" reportedly attempting to run the blockade near the entrance to Chesapeake Bay.

She did not catch this elusive steamer but had better luck the following spring when she chased steamer Pevensey aground near Beaufort, North Carolina, 9 June 1864. Shortly thereafter the blockade runner, carrying arms, lead, bacon, and uniforms for Robert E. Lee's army, exploded.

She scored again 16 December 1864 when, with USS Mount Vernon, she captured and burned schooner G. O. Bigelow in ballast at Bear Inlet, North Carolina.

== Post-war service and decommissioning ==
After the war, New Berne continued service as a supply ship, but for two periods in ordinary, 5 December 1866 to 8 February 1867 and 5 April to 26 November 1867, until decommissioning 29 March 1868.

She was transferred to the U.S. War Department at Washington, D.C. 1 December 1868.
