= Pilots' Association For The Bay & River Delaware =

American maritime pilot organization

- Formation: 1896
- Type: Piloting
- Headquarters: 800 S. Christopher Columbus Blvd, Philadelphia, Pennsylvania, US
- Location: United States
- Official language: English
- Leader: David Cuff (president)
- Key people: Robert Bailey, Daniel MacElrevey, J. Troy Selph, Dennis Cluff, Kevin L. Barrow
- Website: Pilots' Association For The Bay & River Delaware

The Pilots' Association For The Bay & River Delaware is the official maritime pilot group for the Delaware Bay and Delaware River. The association is one of the oldest state pilot organizations in the nation, founded in 1896. Delaware Bay Pilots are licensed maritime pilots for the Delaware Bay and River. Delaware pilots guide oceangoing vessels, passenger liners, freighters and tankers in and out of the harbor. The Delaware Bay is bordered inland by the States of New Jersey and Delaware, and the Delaware Capes, Cape Henlopen to the south and Cape May to the north, on the Atlantic Ocean.

== History ==
=== Delaware Bay Pilot Service ===
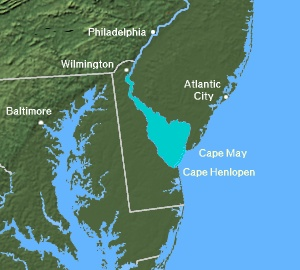
Delaware Bay

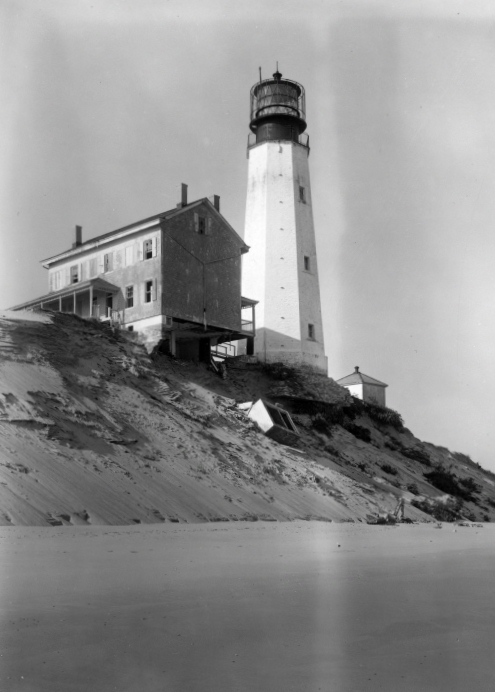
Cape Henlopen Light

Author and historian, John Thomas Scharf, in his book History Of Delaware, said that Delaware Bay Pilots have been piloting ships in the Delaware Bay and Delaware River since 1650. By the end of the 18th century, the Delaware pilots were an organized body of pilots. Pilots served a four-year apprenticeship before taking an examination for their licenses.

Pilots in the Delaware Bay and River were controlled by the laws of Pennsylvania until 1833. One of the first certificates for Delaware pilots was dated 1837. Throughout the colonial period, pilotage continued to develop. Pilots from the three states of New Jersey, Delaware, and Pennsylvania each operated under their own rules. By 1860, the pilot license for the Delaware Bay and River pilots was still issued in Philadelphia. In 1865, the governor of New Netherland reported seeking men who knew the Delaware shoals to serve as pilots. As shipping in the bay increased, pilots would anchor behind Cape Henlopen.

The Governor of Delaware became responsible for appointing pilots' commissioners. In 1881, the state of Delaware ushered in new pilotage legislation. A board of five commissioners was established to issue licenses and rule in disputes. The laws stated that pilotage fees were due when for a crippled vessel or when a ship could not complete her passage up the bay.

=== Competition ===
On September 21, 1882, there was competition and rivalry between New Jersey and Pennsylvania pilots. The resolution of the Board of Port Wardens of Philadelphia said that no Delaware pilots would be able to board the pilot boats E. C. Knight, John G. Whilden, Thomas Howard, or Enoch Turley. The Delaware pilot boats Henry C. Cope and Thomas F. Bayard refused to be governed by the new rules.

=== New association ===
On November 28, 1896, the Delaware Bay and River pilots held their first meeting at the office of F. C. Maull in Lewes. They decided to organize the Pilots' Association for Delaware Bay and River. Financial arrangements were completed at the meeting. Shares were put at $1,000. The business of piloting was consolidated, and earnings were shared equally among active members. The first meeting for the organization was held on December 3, 1896, to adopt the by-laws and elect officers at 319 Walnut Street, Philadelphia. There were 75 Delaware River and Bay pilots present at the meeting. Members of the old Pennsylvania Pilots' Association and the Delaware Pilots' Association were among the members. Pilot Eldridge was elected temporary chairman of the association.

In December 1996, a joint meeting of the Pennsylvania and Delaware pilots was held at the Delaware pilots' office to complete the organization of the two bodies of pilots into a new organization be known as the Delaware Bay and River Pilots' Association. The pilots pooled their resources. They commissioned the Neafie & Levy Ship and Engine building company to build the steel steam pilot boat Philadelphia, which was the first Pilot station five miles outside the cape. The new Pilots' Association had 92 pilots and 12 apprentices. Pilot boats Ebe W. Tunnell and J. Henry Edmunds kept the area of the Five Fathom Bank, which was twenty-five miles east of Cape Henlopen. The William W. Ker and the John G. Whilldin cruised near the Fenwick Island Light.

=== Last of the Delaware sailing schooners ===
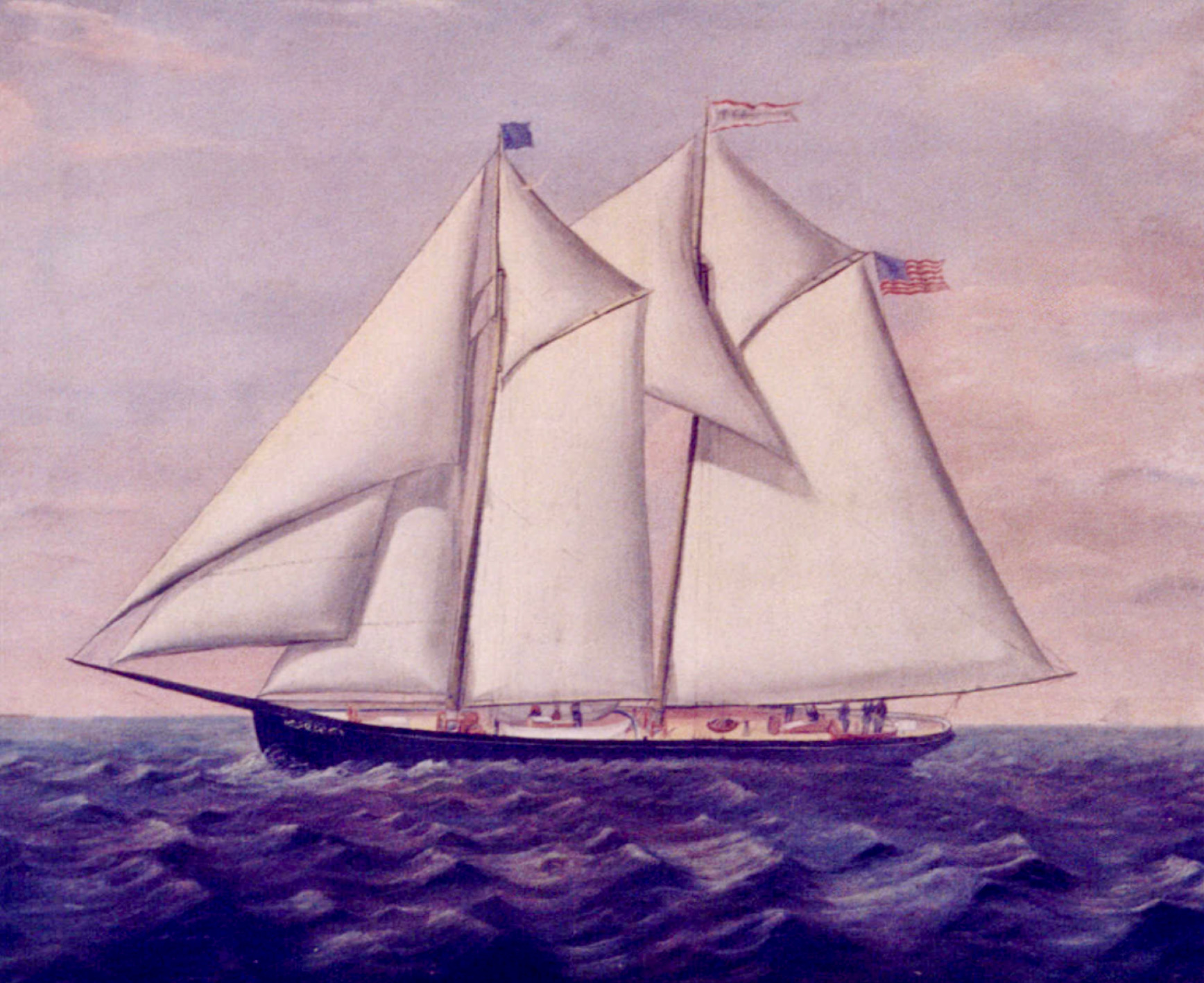
Thomas F. Bayard

The Delaware pilot boats Thomas F. Bayard and Thomas Howard were two of the last sailing schooners that enjoyed a long service. The schooner Thomas Howard was built in 1870, at the Cramps shipyard in Philadelphia for the Delaware Bay maritime pilots. She had a long career in the pilot boat service. Pilot James A. Orton, in 1880, kept a journal of the daily life aboard the Howard. Her dimensions were 79.2 ft in length, 20.6 ft in beam, 7.6 ft in depth in hold, and 50.59 tons. The pilot schooner Thomas F. Bayard was built in 1880, at the C. & R. Poillon shipyard in Brooklyn, New York, for the Delaware Bay pilots. She was 86 ft long and 70 tons. She was named in honor of Thomas F. Bayard, an early Delaware politician and diplomat from Wilmington, Delaware. The Thomas F. Bayard, No. 2, was one of the last schooners in Delaware Bay service.

=== Notable Delaware pilot boats ===
- New Kit or Little Kitty (1810s)
- Matthew L. Bivan (1810s)
- Oscar B. Davis (1820s)
- Louisiana (1820s)
- Henry F. Mierken (1820s)
- William W. Ker (1889)
- Enoch Turley (1842)
- Henry C. Cope (1870s)
- Thomas Howard (1870)
- Thomas F. Bayard (1880)
- Ebe W. Tunnell (1887)

== Today ==
The Pilots' Association for the Bay and River Delaware is located at 800 S. Christopher Columbus Blvd, Philadelphia, Pennsylvania. It is one of the oldest state pilot organizations in the nation. All pilots licensed by the State of Pennsylvania and Delaware are members of the association. Pennsylvania and Delaware pilots are about equally represented in this association. Pilot services are provided on a 24-hour basis by the association. There is a pilot station at Cape Henlopen and offices in Lewes, Delaware, Chesapeake City, Maryland, and Philadelphia.

== See also ==
- Port of Wilmington (Delaware)
- Delaware River and Bay Authority
- Delaware pilot boats
