= C. & R. Poillon =

American shipping company

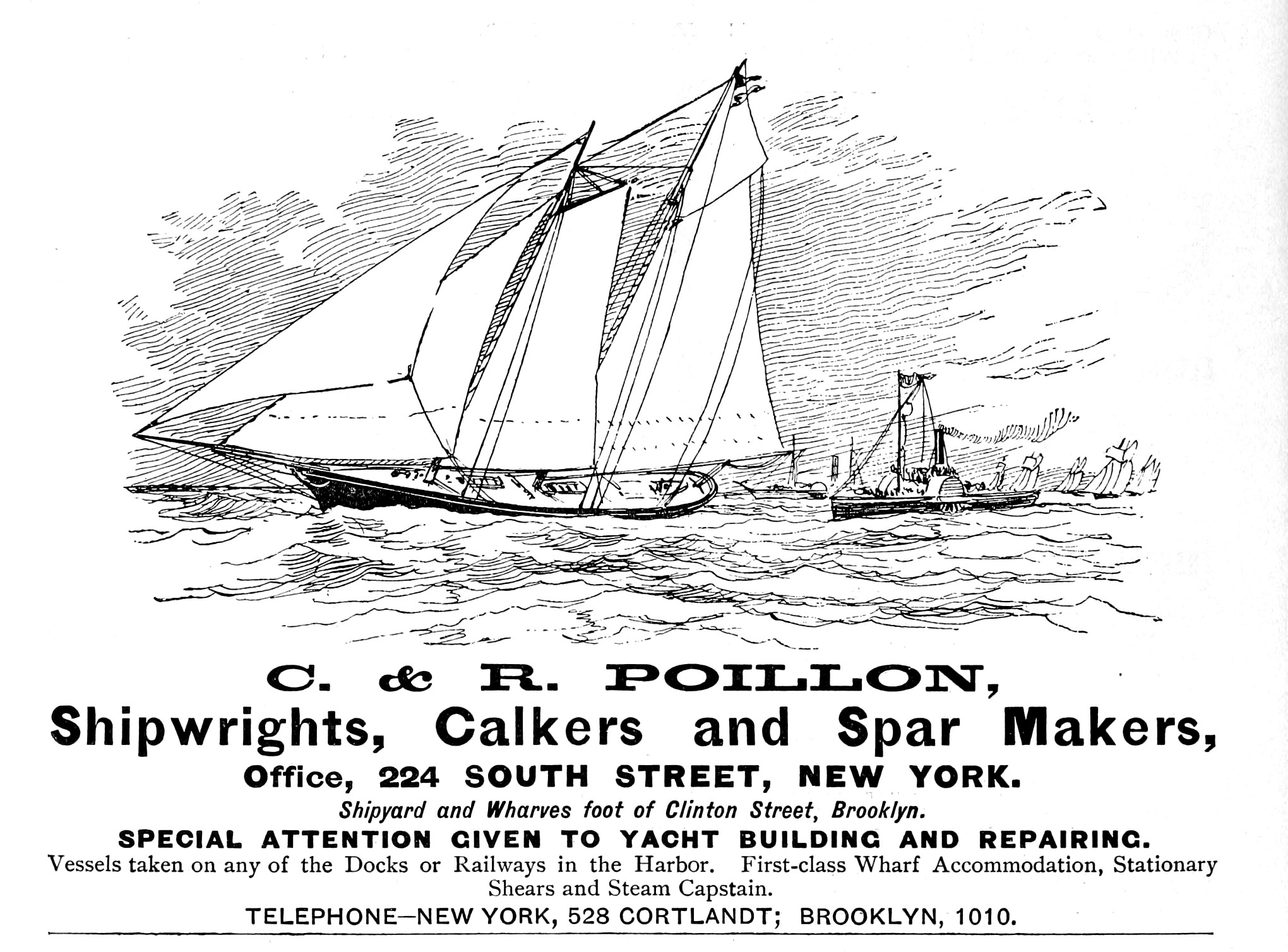
- C. & R. Poillon advertisement, 1893
- Founded: 1845
- Founders: Richard Poillon, Cornelius C. Poillon
- Defunct: 1917
- Headquarters: Brooklyn, New York

C. & R. Poillon was a 19th-century shipyard company in Brooklyn, New York. The company employed over 300 workers, owned several shipyards, and launched 175 vessels. The company was one of the best known clipper ship firms and the last of the wooden hulled boat builders in New York.

== Company history ==
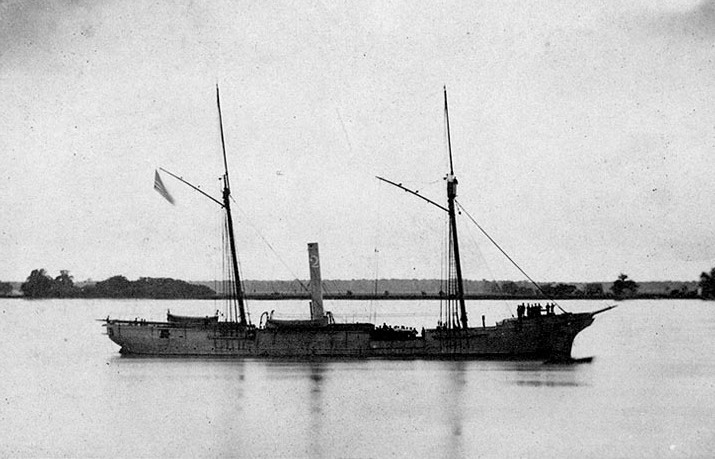
USS Winona Baton Rouge

Richard Poillon (1817-1891), born in New York in 1817, was a partner in the firm C. & R. Poillon shipbuilders, one of the best known clipper ship firms in New York. He learned the profession from his father who first owned the shipyard. In 1845, he and his brother, Cornelius (1815-1881) opened an office at 224 South Street, New York City, with a lumberyard and saw mill.

C. & R. Poillon was in attendance at an 1855 meeting of shipowners, merchants, and shipbuilders, held in New York City, to discuss the adoption of a resolution to increase the pay to $2.50 per day for shipyard services.

=== Bridge Street shipyard ===
In 1858, the brothers purchased a new shipyard on Bridge Street in Brooklyn. The Bridge Street shipyard offered services for building, designing and repairing all types of vessels. The shipyard also did a wholesale business in spars, planks, knees decking, and treenails.

=== American Civil War ===
During the American Civil War, C. & R. Poillon built ferry boats and steamships for civilian firms and gunboats. The gunboats USS Winona (1861), USS New Berne (1862), and USS Grand Gulf (1863) were built for the United States Navy.

The company built the steamship Ajax (1864 ship) in 1864 to provide logistical support to the Union Army on the Atlantic coast during the Civil War. After the war, the Poillon brothers continued to build steamers, naval vessels, pilot boats and yachts.

=== Pilot boats, yachts, naval vessels ===
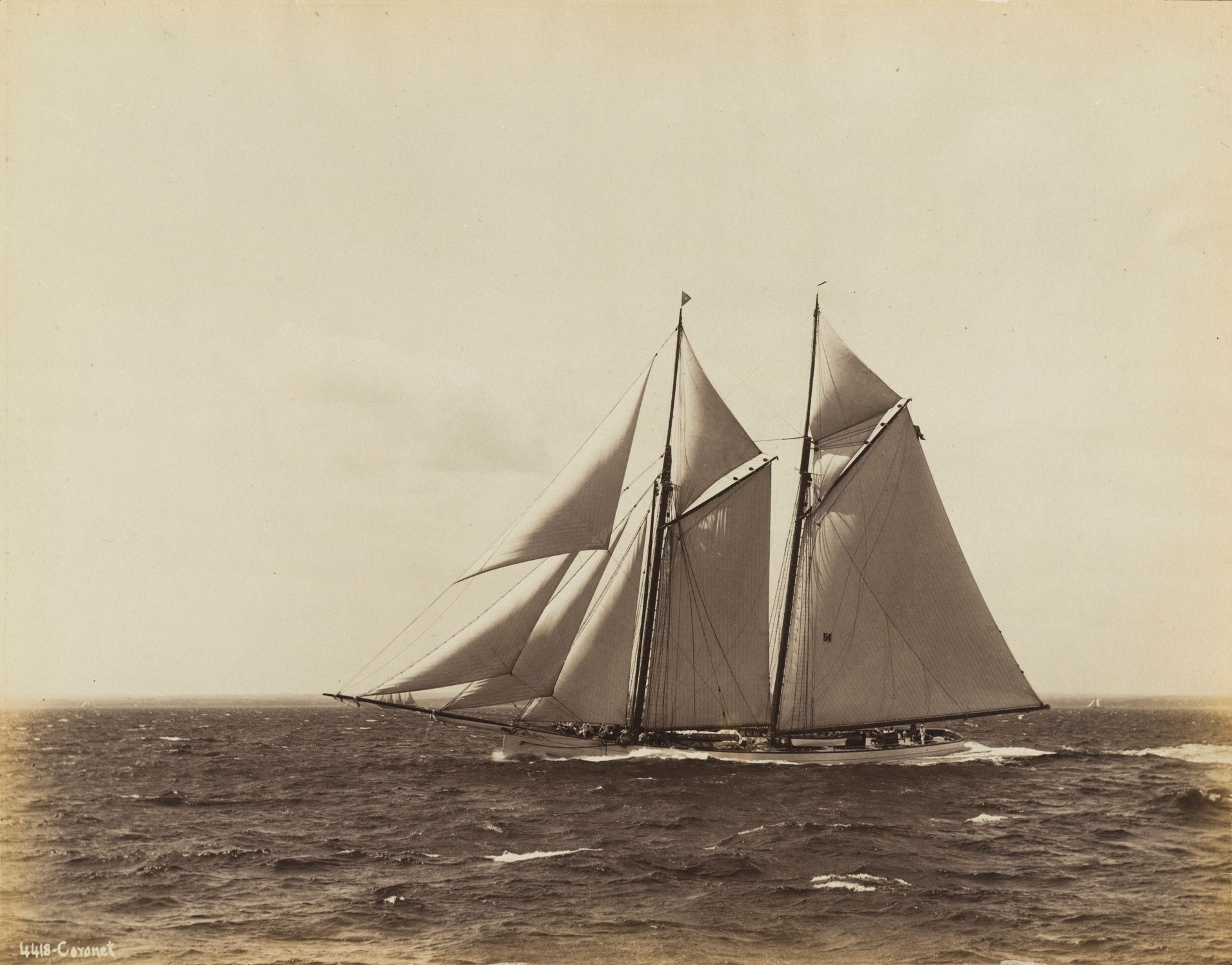
Stebbins-Coronet-1893-08-07

In 1867, the yacht Sappho was built by C. & R. Poillon, which was an America's Cup defender. In 1872, they built the Japanese warships Capron and Kuroda, the first warships constructed for the Japanese government.

On August 12, 1875, the pilot-boat E. C. Knight was launched from the C & R Poilon shipyard at the foot of Bridge Street. The New York pilot boat Alexander M. Lawrence was designed in 1879, for Captain Michael Murphy. She was one of the largest and fastest in the Sandy Hook fleet.

In 1881, the schooner, Norseman was designed by William Townsend and built at the C. & R. Poillon shipyard for Ogden Goelet, who was a real estate developer. The yacht Coronet was built for oil tycoon Rufus T. Bush in 1885.

In 1890, the pilot-boat David T. Leahy was launched at the C & R Poillon shipyard and witnessed by fifteen hundred people. James D. M. Beebe was part-owner of the boat.

=== Gowanus shipyard ===
After Cornelius died on July 11, 1881, James O. Poillon (1849-1922), son of Richard and Mary Whitmore Poillon, and his cousin, Richard E. Pease, joined the shipyard. In 1882, a second shipyard was purchased in the Gowanus Basin in Brooklyn, at the end of Clinton Street (40.6687750°N 74.004614650°W).

In 1862, Richard and his wife Mary purchased a house on No. 36 East 38th Street, New York. After Richard died on July 4, 1891, his wife lived there until her death in 1901. The property was sold to Middleton S. Burrill and his wife Emilie N. Burrill.

The Bridge Street shipyard continued until 1904 when it ceased operation. The Gowanus shipyard was sold to the Todd Shipyard in 1917.

== See also ==
- List of sailboat designers and manufacturers
- List of Northeastern U. S. Pilot Boats
