= E. C. Knight =

Pilot boat

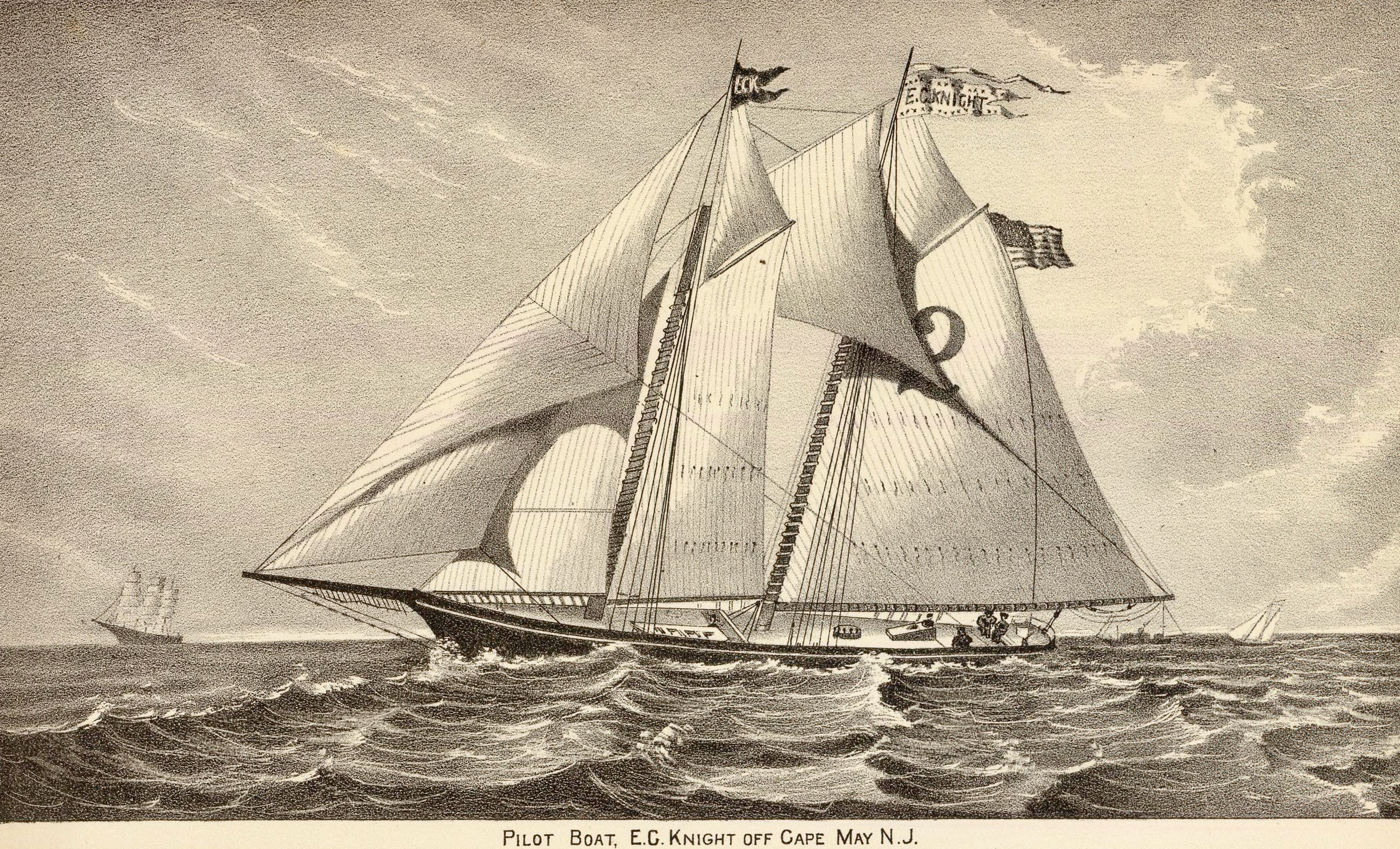
- Pilot Boat E. C. Knight, No. 2, off Cape May, New Jersey

History

United States
- Name: E. C. Knight
- Owner: Delaware River Pilots
- Operator: Ellis Eldridge
- Builder: C. & R. Poillon
- Cost: $17,000
- Launched: August 12, 1875
- Fate: Sold

General characteristics
- Class & type: Schooner
- Tonnage: 72-tons TM
- Length: 85 ft 2 in (25.96 m)
- Depth: 8 ft 6 in (2.59 m)
- Propulsion: Sail

The E. C. Knight, also known as the Edward C. Knight, was a 19th-century pilot boat built by the C. & R. Poillon shipyard in 1875 for the Delaware River Pilots. She was the finest and fastest pilot-boat belonging to the Philadelphia port. She was sold to the Brunswick Pilots' Association of Georgia in 1898.

== Construction and service ==
On August 12, 1875, the pilot-boat Edward C. Knight was launched from the C. & R. Poillon shipyard at the foot of Bridge Street, Brooklyn, New York. She was built for the Delaware fleet at a cost of $17,000.

She was registered with the Record of American and Foreign Shipping from 1876 to 1900 as the E. C. Knight. The owners were the Delaware River Pilots, belonging to the port of Philadelphia. She was 85.2 feet long and weighed 72-tons. The sail number "2" was painted in black on her mainsail to distinguish her from other pilot-boats.

Captain Ellis Eldridge was commander of the pilot-boat E. C. Knight of the Delaware Breakwater Squadron.

On January 3, 1877, the pilot-boat E. C. Knight, No. 2 of Philadelphia, came to New York port for repairs to a main boom and steering gear. She was caught in a heavy gale and unable to proceed to Philadelphia because of ice in the Delaware river. Later that year, on October 4, 1877, pilot Ellis Eldridge was on the pilot boat E. C. Knight when he, in an act of heroism, rescued twenty-two passengers and crew of the steamship Magnolia that was sinking off Cape Hatteras due to a strong gale. They were brought to the Delaware Breakwater and taken to Lewes, Delaware.

On December 27, 1879, off Cape May, New Jersey on a freezing morning, apprentice 16 year old Joseph Gregory was knocked overboard and drowned by the boom of the pilot-boat E. C. Night. Every effort to rescue him was unsuccessful On Gregory's tombstone is the inscription: "Lost off Pilot Boat E.C. Knight."

In 1882, the pilot-boats Knight of the Pennsylvania pilots and Bayard of the Delaware service raced for the steamship Indiana. The Knight, with pilot Ellis Eldridge, got there first and put Eldridge on board the Indiana. She was the finest pilot-boat belonging to the Pennsylvania pilots.

In October, 1886, the pilot boat Edward C. Knight and the John G. Whilldin were in a collision at the Delaware Breakwater east of Lewes, Delaware on Cape Henlopen.

During the Great Blizzard of 1888 the pilot boats E. C. Knight and J. Henry Edmunds were blown out to sea during the storm. Pilot Ellis Eldredge were on board.

On August 26, 1893, the Knight rescued two members of the crew of the sinking Relief Ship No. 37 near the Five Fathom Bank Lightship in New Jersey.

On February 13, 1895, the E. C. Knight off Cape May, New Jersey went missing for several days but was found.

== End of Delaware service ==
On September 11, 1898, the pilot boat E. C. Knight one of the fastest pilot-boats in the North Atalantic coast, was sold to the Brunswick Pilots' Association of Georgia for $2,800 by her current owners Pilots' Association for Delaware. The E. C. Knight continued her Brunswick pilot-boat service until 1919, when it was sold to a private party in Key West, Florida for transporting from the Islands south of Florida to Key West.

== See also ==
- List of Pennsylvania pilot boats
