= Carling (sailing) =

Piece of timber laid under the deck of a ship

In shipbuilding, carlings are two pieces of timber laid fore and aft under the deck of a ship, from one beam to another, directly over the keel. They serve as a foundation for the whole body of the ship; on these the ledges rest, whereon the planks of the deck, and other structures are fastened. The ends of the carlings are let culvertail into the beams.

The great carlings are those on which the mainmast stands. There are also carlings of the capstan, among others.

Carling knees are timbers going traversely, from the sides to the hatchway, serving to sustain the deck on both sides.
