= John G. Whilldin =

Pilot boat

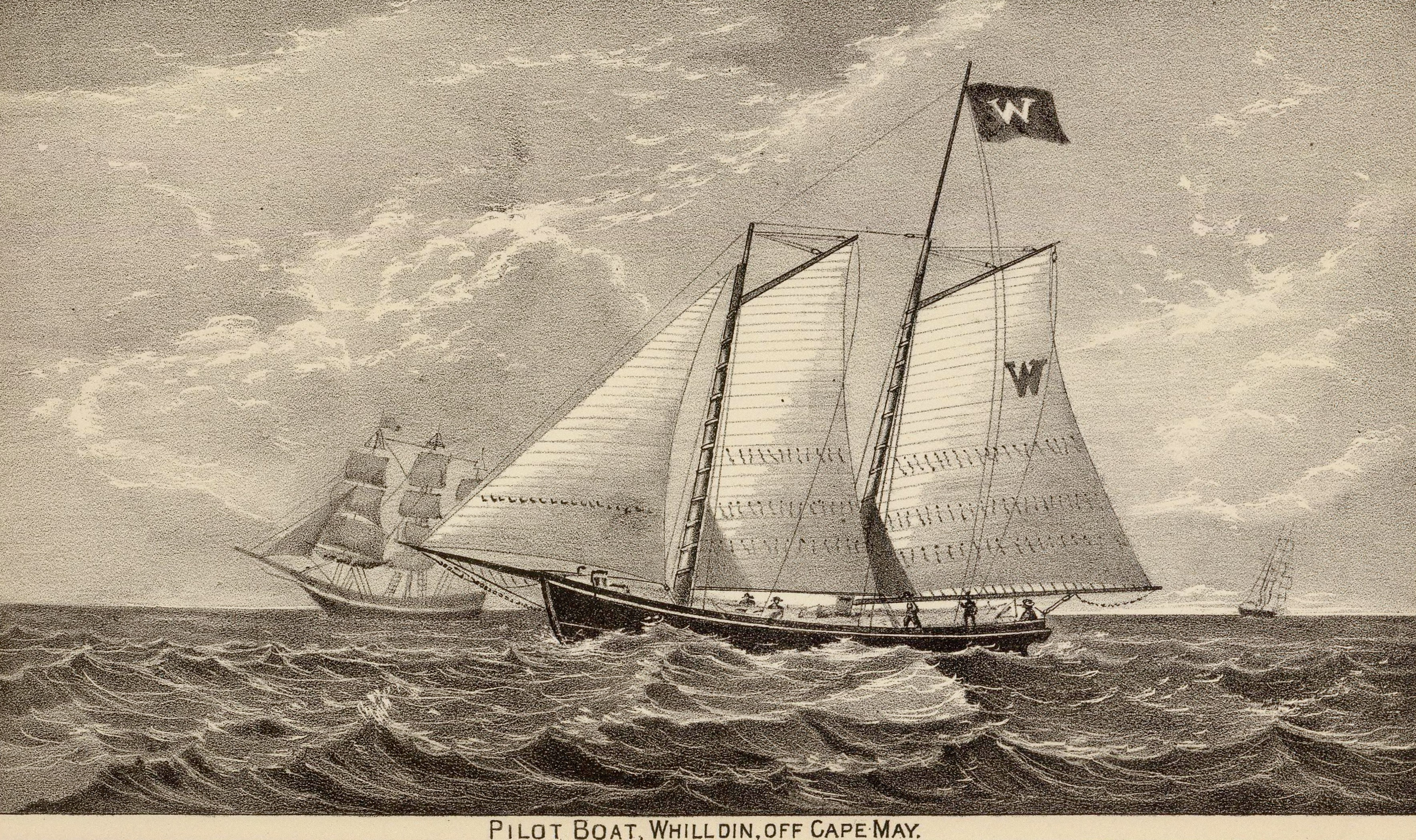
- Pilot Boat John G. Whilldin

History

United States
- Name: John G. Whilldin
- Namesake: Dr. John G. Whilldin
- Operator: Humphrey Hughes
- Builder: Joseph Vogle shipyard
- Launched: August 1, 1839
- Out of service: September 8, 1915
- Fate: Wrecked

General characteristics
- Class & type: schooner
- Tonnage: 85-tons TM
- Propulsion: Sail

The John G. Whilldin was a 19th-century Pennsylvania pilot schooner built in 1839 by the Joseph Vogle shipyard of Southwark, Philadelphia. In 1893, the Board of Port Wardens of Philadelphia recognized only four pilot boats for the Port of Philadelphia, the E. C. Knight, John G. Whilldin, William W. Ker and J. Henry Edmunds. On September 8, 1915, the Whilldin was reported as wrecked near Port St. Joe, Florida.

== Construction and service ==
Pilot boat John G. Whilldin was launched on August 1, 1839, from the shipyard of Joseph Vogle, from Southwark, Philadelphia. At her launch she sailed from Cape May, New Jersey. She was named in honor of Dr. Whilldin, son of Captain Wilmon Whilldin of Philadelphia. Whilldin was 85-tons burthen.

In 1839, the pilots of Delaware had seven boats ready for use. The Thomas P. Cropper, Lewis Pulaski and Thomas A. Morgan, that sailed from Lewes, Delaware; the Spartan, Leonidas and John G. Whilldin that sailed from Cape May; and the William Price from Philadelphia.

On September 20, 1861, lying at the Breakwater during a fierce storm, Christopher Eldridge was on the pilot boat John G. Whilldin when lightning hit the mast as he was leaning against the mainmast watching the storm, which killed him instantly.

Captain Humphrey Hughes was the pilot on the Whilldin when it was capsized on November 29, 1870, as it was caught up with heavy breakers. She had two apprentices on board that all made it to shore.

On May 4, 1876, pilot boat Johnn G. Whilldin sailed through a lot cases of coal oil near Cape May and was able to pick up 86 cases, containing two tin cans each of five gallons, making 860 gallons of refined petroleum.

In 1882, there was competition and rivalry between New Jersey and Pennsylvania pilots and the Delaware pilots. The Delaware pilotage laws had hurt trade in the Port of Philadelphia. Because of this, on September 21, 1882, the Board of Port Wardens of Philadelphia approved a resolution to assign seven pilots, that were attached to Delaware boats, and assign them to Pennsylvania boats. There were five pilots assigned to the Cape Henlopen boats, Thomas Howard and Enoch Turley and two pilots assigned to the Cape May boats, John G. Whilldin and E. C. Knight. The resolution said that there would be no further connection with the Delaware pilots and that the Delaware pilots would not be able to board the New Jersey and Pennsylvania pilot boats. The Delaware pilots had only the pilot boats Henry C. Cope and the Thomas F. Bayard, which refused to be governed by the new rules.

On August 3, 1886, the Board of Port Wardens of Philadelphia met and adopted two new resolutions that amended the September 1882 resolutions. The Pilot Commissioners of the State of Delaware declared that the pilot boat Thomas Howard would become a Delaware pilot boat. As a result, the board recognized four pilot boats, the E. C. Knight, John G. Whilldin, Enoch Turley and Christian Bergh. The Pennsylvania pilots were instructed to have the abbreviation "Penna." placed on the sail, which contained the boat number.

In October, 1886, the Pennsylvania pilot boats Edward C. Knight and the John G. Whilldin were in a collision at the Delaware Breakwater east of Lewes, Delaware on Cape Henlopen.

By August 1893, the Board of Port Wardens recognized only four pilot boats for the Port of Philadelphia, the E. C. Knight, John G. Whilldin, William W. Ker and J. Henry Edmunds.

In December 1996, a joint meeting of the Pennsylvania and Delaware pilots was held at the Delaware pilots' office with the purpose to complete the organization of the two bodies of pilots into a new organization to be known as the Delaware Bay and River Pilots' Association.

== End of service ==
Steam power rendered the John G. Whilldin obsolete. She was sold as a fruit schooner running between the Gulf ports and the West Indies. On January 10, 1898, the schooner John G. Whilldin arrived in Jacksonville, Florida. On September 8, 1915, she was wrecked in a hurricane and eight of her crew were lost. Charles Ross was the only one that was rescued from the wreckage near Port St. Joe, Florida.

== See also ==
- List of Pennsylvania Pilot boats
- Pilots' Association For The Bay & River Delaware
