= Jackson and Sharp Company =

Rolling stock manufacturer

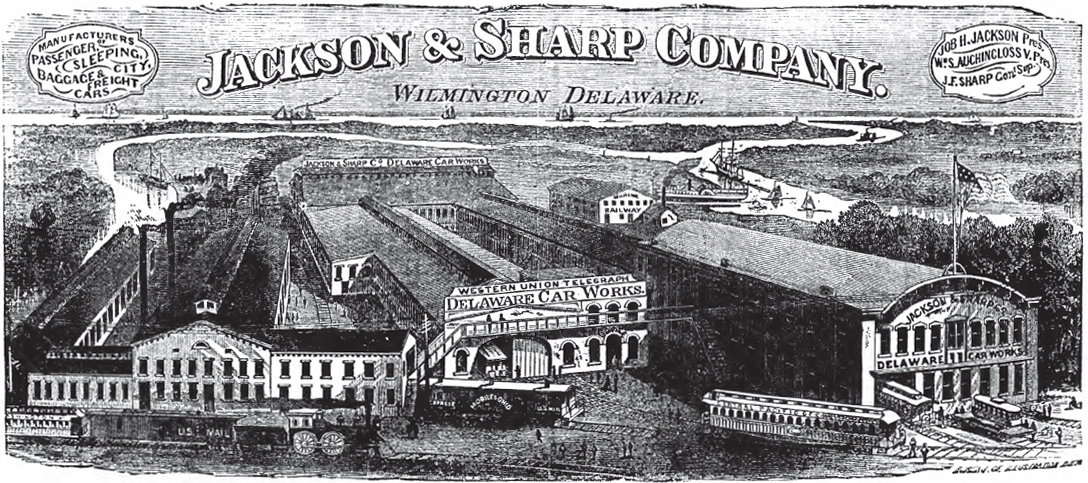
Jackson & Sharp plant in Wilmington, Delaware in the 1870s

Jackson and Sharp Company was an American railroad car manufacturer and shipbuilder in the late 19th and early 20th centuries. The company was founded in 1863 by Job H. Jackson (b. 1833), a tinsmith and retail merchant, and Jacob F. Sharp (b. 1815), a carpenter who had worked for rail car manufacturers and shipbuilders.

== Rolling stock plant ==
Jackson and Sharp built a fabrication plant, called the Delaware Car Works, in Wilmington, Delaware near the mouth of Brandywine Creek. In the early years the facility had storage capacity for 6 cars and about 100 employees. By 1880 the plant produced 400 passenger cars per year. Through facility expansions on the 12 acres (49,000 m^{2}) site, the capacity grew to 75 cars, with about 1,000 employees in the late 1880s. At that time it was considered to be the largest rolling stock plant in the Americas. Clients included Great Western Railroad (Illinois), South Side Elevated Railroad (Chicago), Denver and Rio Grande Railway, King Oscar II of Sweden, and Emperor Dom Pedro of Brazil.

It supplied the passenger cars for the Waterloo & City Railway in London, England, in 1897-8.

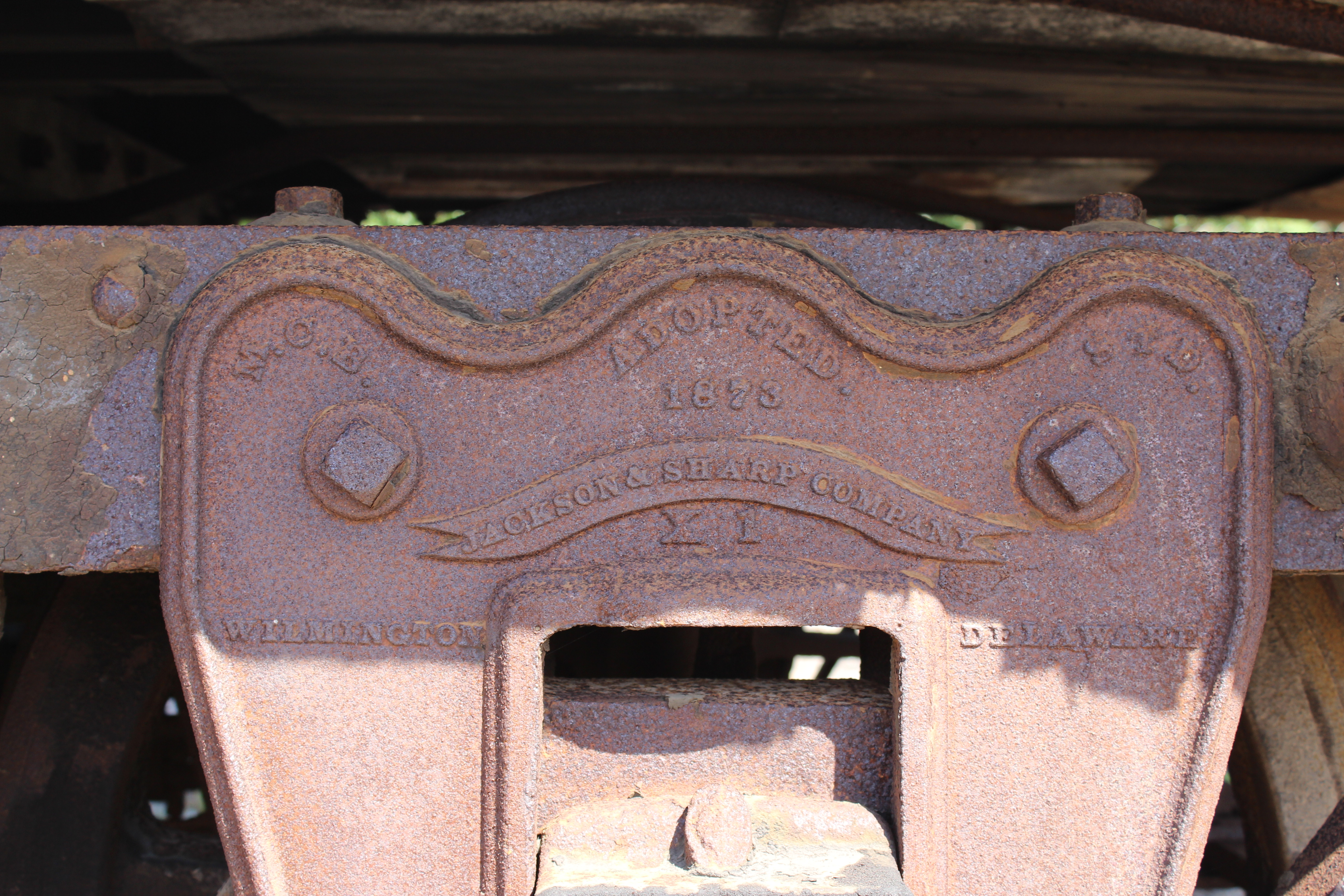
Detail of the bogie that was formerly fitted to NSWGR sleeping car No. AH1 which was built by Jackson & Sharp in 1877, now fitted to former sleeping car No. AH2.

== Shipyard ==
The company purchased the Christina River Shipyards in 1875. The facility built wooden vessels such as schooners and barges, as well as steam-powered vessels. By 1900 the rolling stock and shipyard facilities totalled 30 acres (120,000 m^{2}), with 1,200 to 1,500 employees.

== Merger and 20th century operations ==
American Car and Foundry (ACF) leased the Jackson and Sharp facilities for 10 years, beginning in 1901. In 1911 ACF purchased the plant and focused on manufacturing passenger cars for export, although shipbuilding continued as well.

During World War I the plant built wooden submarine chasers, rail cars and munitions equipment to support the war effort. After the war, the shipyard continued to build yachts, but wooden shipbuilding ended in 1938. Rail car production also ended in the 1930s. The plant then focused on steel shipbuilding, and built small craft for the U.S. Navy during World War II. After the war, limited rail car production was resumed. Owing to a small number of orders, ACF stopped production in 1950, and sold the plant to a warehouse company in 1952.

== Products ==
- Rolling stock - standard gauge and narrow gauge
  - Passenger cars
  - Freight cars
  - Baggage-mail-passenger cars
  - Dining cars
  - Parlor cars and private cars
  - Sleeping cars
  - Streetcars
- Watercraft - wood and steel
  - Schooners
  - Barges
  - Carfloats
  - Ferryboats
  - Tugboats
  - Yachts
  - U.S. Navy - small craft
- Woodwork
  - Architectural millwork for buildings
  - Cabinets
