= Five Fathom Bank light station =

Coordinates: 38.8354°N 75.0119°W

Five Fathom Bank light station was a station for lightvessels in New Jersey, United States. It was located off the south end of Five Fathom Bank, 14.7 miles and 100 degrees from the Cape May Lighthouse. The station was in service from 1837 to 1972 before ultimately being replaced by a horn buoy.

== Service ==
Records for lightvessels are incomplete.

On or about April 30, 1891, LV-40 was removed from its post on Five Fathom Bank and replaced by a schooner Drift, which temporarily would show a fixed white light on each masthead. Additionally, a buoy was used as an additional marker for the position while LV-40 was repaired.

In 1893, the USS New York (ACR-2) was performing sea trials and used the Five Fathom Bank light station and the North East End light station as markers to which it became the fastest armored vessel in the world. In 1894, the USS Minneapolis (C-13) again used the Five Fathom Bank light as a marker for its trial which it became the fastest armored vessel in the world.

On February 2, 1913, the Steamship Prinz Oskar and the schooner City of Georgetown collided and blamed the lightship for the accident. The City of Georgetown was heading towns the Cape Hatteras lightship in the southeast while the Prinz Oskar was heading in a circle to the northeast "in a great circle toward the transatlantic steamship route" with the Five Banks Light shone between the two vessels. Unable to see each other until it was too late, the Prinz Oskar collided with the ship and resulted in a large stove in its port bow, but the City of Georgetown was doomed and sank within 8 minutes. Captain A. J. Slocum and his crew of seven managed to get into their lifeboat and was taken aboard the Prinz Oskar and returned to Philadelphia for repair, listing to the starboard. The City of Georgetown was a 170 feet (52 m) long schooner with a 40 feet (12 m) beam that was launched in 1902 from Bath, Maine. The ship sank with its cargo of salt, of unlisted weight, but the ship's capacity was 1900 tons.

== List of lightships by year ==
Name	Year	Reference
Unknown ship	1837-1839	
LV-18	1839-1869	
LV-37	1869-1876	
LV-40	1877-1904	
LV-79 / WAL-506	1904-1924	
LV-108 / WAL-530	1924-1942	
Buoy	1942-1945	
LV-108 / WAL-530	1945-1970	
LV-110 / WAL-532	1970-1971	
WLV-189	1971-1972	
