= RNLB Foresters Centenary =

Ship

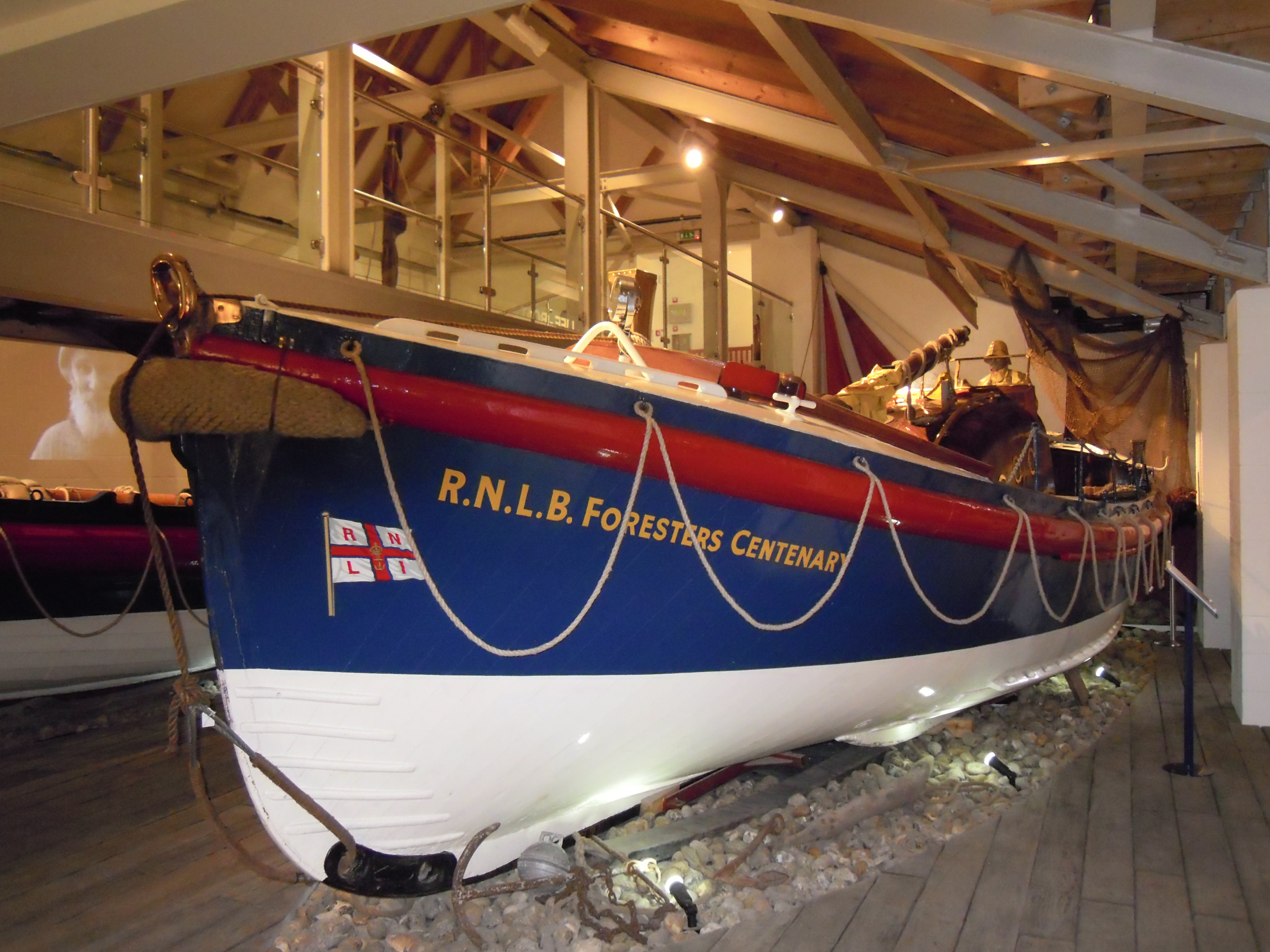
- RNLB Foresters Centenary (ON 786)

History

United Kingdom
- Name: Foresters Centenary
- Namesake: Ancient Order of Foresters Friendly Society
- Owner: Royal National Lifeboat Institution (RNLI)
- Builder: Groves & Guttridge, Cowes, Isle of Wight
- Official Number: ON 786
- Donor: A gift of The Ancient Order of Foresters' Friendly Society
- Stations: Sheringham
- Cost: £3,568 10s 5d
- Yard number: No:G&G210
- Christened: 15 June 1962 by Sir Roger Keyes at the Old Hythe Lifeboat station
- Acquired: 1936
- Decommissioned: 1961
- In service: 1937 to 1960
- Nickname(s): Airmen's lifeboat
- Status: Displayed in Sheringham Museum

General characteristics
- Class & type: Liverpool class
- Type: Non self-righting lifeboat
- Tonnage: 6 tons 1cwt
- Length: 35 ft 6 in (10.82 m) overall
- Beam: 10 ft 3 in (3.12 m)
- Installed power: Single 35hp Weyburn AE.6 six cylinder petrol
- Propulsion: Single Screw
- Speed: 7.3 kn (13.5 km/h)
- Range: 60 nmi (110 km)
- Capacity: up to 30 people
- Crew: 7

RNLB Foresters Centenary (ON 786) is a retired Liverpool-class lifeboat of the Royal National Lifeboat Institution (RNLI), stationed in the English coastal town of Sheringham in the county of Norfolk in the United Kingdom. The lifeboat was on station for 25 years between 1936 and 1961 when she was sold. She has been restored to her original condition and is exhibited in Sheringham Museum.

== Design and construction ==
Foresters Centenary was the first motor lifeboat to be stationed at Sheringham. She was built with the money provided as a gift of The Ancient Order of Foresters Friendly Society. She cost £3,568 10s 5d and was laid down in the boat yard of Groves & Guttridge, East Cowes, Isle of Wight and was given the yard designation of No:G&G210. She was a single screw Liverpool type and although she was not a self-righting construction. She was a very stable design and was popular with lifeboat crews of this time. She was 35 ft 6in in length and had a beam of 10 ft 3in.

=== Propulsion ===
Foresters Centenary was fitted with a single 35 horsepower Weyburn AE6 six cylinder petrol engine which was housed in its own watertight compartment. The design enabled the engine to continue to run even if the engine room became flooded. During the lifeboat's sea trials the engine was found to give the lifeboat a top speed of 7.3 Knots and fuel consumption gave the boat a radius of fifty nautical miles with a fuel consumption of 3.5 gallons used each hour of operation. Her comfortable cruising speed was found to be 6.5 knots, which at this speed and fuel consumption extended her range to sixty nautical miles.

=== Buoyancy ===
The lifeboat's hull was constructed to form six water-tight divisions. These compartments are fitted with 115 mahogany air cases, all individually made to fit into their allocated positions in the hull. Her equipment included the latest innovations of the time: a line-throwing gun and an electrically-powered searchlight. The boat was designed to be operated by a crew of seven and could carry up to thirty people in foul weather, although there was little protection for the crew or passengers.

== Deployment ==
Foresters Centenary arrived on station in Sheringham on 27 June 1936. She had been sailed around the south east coast from Cowes by the Sheringham crew of Coxswain James Dumble, second Coxswain J. Hardingham, and "Old" Bennett Middleton and mechanic Kitchener Pegg. To house this new lifeboat and the carriage required to launch her, the RNLI had to invest in a new boathouse for Sheringham. This new station was built at the cost of £7,616 and stood at a right angle to the sea due to the tightness of the new site. It had a specially-constructed slipway over the shingle beach. The new boathouse had not been completed by the time Foresters Centenary arrived in the town, and for a time she was kept at Old Hythe House.

=== Christening ===
The Foresters Centenary was christened on 18 July 1936 by Admiral of the Fleet Sir Roger Keyes. The ceremony was attended by a large crowd of people including 2000 members of the Order of Foresters.

== Service ==
Foresters Centenary was on station at Sheringham for twenty five years from 1936 until she was sold to R. C. Baker of Wells-next-the-Sea on 18 September 1961. During that time she was launched a total of 129 times and she is accredited with saving the lives of 82 people.

=== First service ===
The lifeboat was first called into action on 7 August 1936 when she was launched and stood by two local fishing boats called Liberty II and Edna. Her first accredited lifesaving launch took place on 19 August when an exhausted local fisherman was towed to safety after he had struggled to control his boat in rough seas. The lifeboat was called out a total of six times before the outbreak of the Second World War.

=== Second World War service ===
Given the location of the Sheringham station on the North Norfolk coast, the lifeboat and her crew found themselves in considerable demand during the Second World War. The station lay on the flight path of several RAF stations in that part of the country. Many of the lifeboat's launches during the period were to search for crashed aircraft and their pilots and crews. During the War the lifeboat was launched fifty six times, of which thirty four involved aircraft and their crews, of which sixteen have been accredited as life saves. Because of this service, Foresters Centenary became known as the "Airmen's lifeboat".

==== East Dudgeon Lightship ====
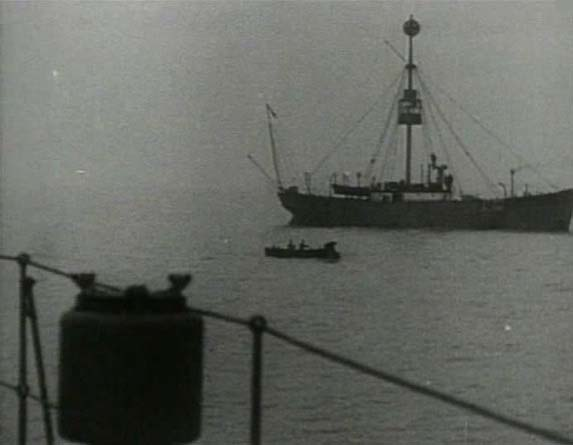
Screenshot of the lightship

One of the lifeboat's wartime activities was used in a short film produced by the Crown Film Unit for the British Ministry of Information in 1940. The incident occurred on 29 January 1940 when Foresters Centenary was launched at 9:15 am into rough seas in an easterly gale. She was sent to assist the East Dudgeon Lightship which had reportedly been bombed by German planes. When the lifeboat arrived alongside the lightship the crew found no one aboard. The crew found the ship's light had been destroyed, as had the wheelhouse windows which had been shot out. One of the lightship's lifeboats was missing and following a long search for the lifeboat the Sheringham crew assumed that the lifeboat and its possible survivors had been picked up by a passing vessel. The lifeboat returned to Sheringham to find that the missing lifeboat had still not been found. The lifeboat was launched the following day to search westward for signs of the missing boat. The Sheringham boat was recalled by the coastguard who now had conformation that the lifeboat had been swept across to the Lincolnshire coast where it had been driven ashore, drowning all but one of the crew.

==== Other notable wartime rescues ====
On 19 February 1940 the coaster Boston Trader of Great Yarmouth was attacked and set on fire by German aircraft. Following a difficult launch of the lifeboat she managed to rescue seven men from the coaster. The Boston Trader eventually drifted ashore along the coast at Cley next the Sea. The rough seas had extinguished the fire aboard and she was eventually salvaged.

The lifeboat was launched on 21 October to assist a ditched British bomber close to Blakeney Point. The lifeboat came upon a rubber dinghy with all five of the crew, very tired and wet but all unharmed. The aircrew were given chocolate and brandy from the lifeboat's emergency rations and were taken back to the safety of Sheringham where they were given warm clothes following warm baths.

On 29 October 1941 the lifeboat was launched under very difficult conditions to a steamship in difficulty five miles west of Sheringham. The Canadian ship Eaglescliffe Hall appeared to be drifting and the Foresters Centenary rescued 15 men from her. The lifeboat's Coxswain James Dumble, was awarded the RNLI's Bronze Medal for the rescue.

The lifeboat spent the rest of the war mainly being called out to casualties of the conflict. On 30 October 1941 the lifeboat launched to search for a Wellington bomber (no. W5720) of No. 304 Polish Bomber Squadron which had ditched in the sea two miles north-east of the town after being damaged by flak during a raid over Hamburg. The lifeboat saved the lives of five Polish airman who had been found all in one dinghy, a sixth airman had drowned whilst escaping the ditched aircraft. The airmen had been in the dinghy for seventeen hours when rescued. During this time they had had no food and the lifeboatmen had given them rum, chocolate and biscuits from the emergency rations aboard the lifeboat. They were landed safely in town and were soon on their way back to their station at RAF Lindholme in Yorkshire.

==== 1942 ====
On 30 October 1942 the lifeboat was again involved in rescuing Polish airmen from their ditched aircraft. A Halifax bomber of No. 138 Squadron RAF was returning to RAF Tempsford following a Special Duty Operation. The plane was on its return journey of what had been called Operation Wrench, an arms supply drop over Poland. The Halifax was being piloted by Stanislaw Klosowski of the Polish Air Force. The crew of the Halifax reported they had been badly damaged by Bf 110 night-fighters, sustaining damage to control surfaces, engines and fuel tanks. The distressed plane had been spotted in the water by the coast guard north-east of Sheringham. Foresters Centenary was launched with some difficulty and soon was at the crash site. She rescued all six members of the Polish crew from a dinghy and returned them to Sheringham.

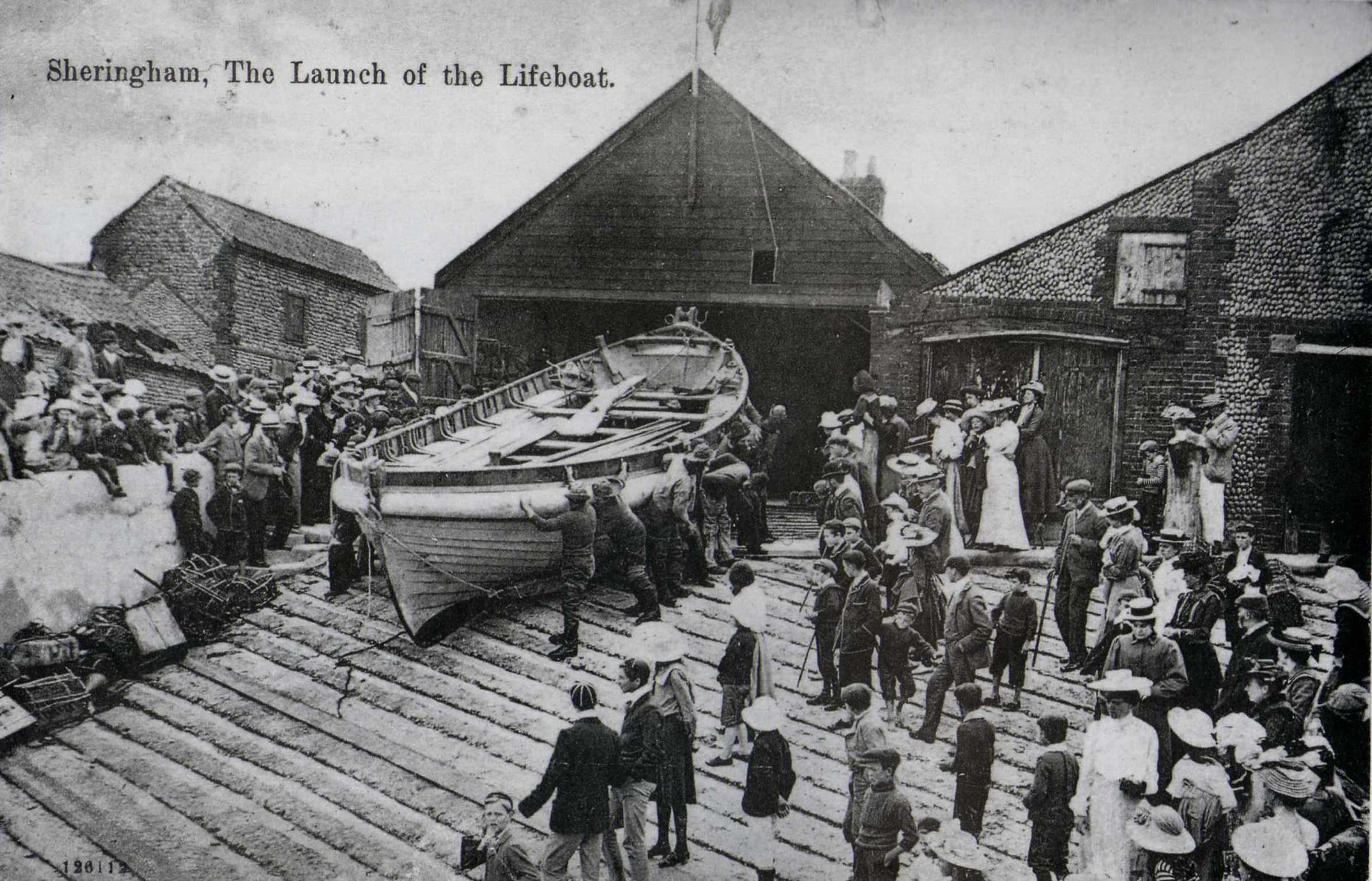
Henry Ramey Upcher outside her boathouse

==== 1945 ====
The Foresters Centenary's last wartime service took place on 16 August 1945, to go to the assistance of one of the town's former lifeboats Henry Ramey Upcher. The former private lifeboat had gone to sea with sixty passengers to take part in the town's regatta to celebrate Victory over Japan Day. The old lifeboat was about two miles offshore when she encountered problems. The boat was unable to make headway against a very strong westerly breeze. The Foresters Centenary was launched and took the Henry Ramey Upcher in tow, beaching her back in Sheringham.

=== Post war period ===
Following the war the Foresters Centenary's first peacetime service was on 9 December 1945 when she went to the assistance of the steamship Lady Sophia. The steamship was six miles north west of Cromer and had engine failure. The lifeboat took the ship in tow until a tug from Great Yarmouth took over. In December 1946 James Edward Dumble retired after 22 years as the coxswain and John Henry 'Sparrow' Hardingham became coxswain. In September the Foresters Centenary was called out twice in one week. On 14 September she launched to assist the United States Type T2 oil tanker SS El Morro which had run aground on Sheringham Shoal. On 21 September she attended the ketch Livre which was towed with difficulties to Wells next the Sea.

==== 1950s ====
The decade of the 1950s kept the Foresters Centenary busy as coastal maritime traffic began to return to pre-war levels. On average the lifeboat was launched three time a year. On 31 December 1950 the lifeboat was launched to the Dutch motor vessel Johanne TeVelde which had been showing distress signals following engine trouble and had become lost in fog. Second Coxswain Henry 'Downtide' West went aboard and showed the captain where he was on his charts and following the repair of the engines she set of on her way. This was to be the last service of Coxswain John Henry 'Sparrow' Hardingham who retired after forty two years in the service.

==== 1955 ====
Another significant service took place on 19 May 1955 which involved the rescue of the crew members of the Turkish steam ship Zor of Istanbul. The ship, carrying a cargo of timber, started listing after her cargo shifted in the bad weather. The vessel was four miles north-west of the Dudgeon lightvessel. Initially the Wells lifeboat RNLB Cecil Paine rescued several of the crew, but four men decided to stay aboard to try to save the vessel. Cecil Paine, which was now running low on fuel, had to return to her station. Foresters Centenary arrived at the scene to relieve her. By the time the lifeboat arrived it was clear to Coxswain West that the Zor was sinking. A northerly gale was blowing in full force and Coxswain West asked the captain to abandon ship but he refused. The tug Serviceman arrived on the scene with the intention of taking the Zor in tow. Almost immediately after the tow began the ship began to list violently. With this turn of events the captain asked the lifeboat to help them abandon ship. To extract the remaining four men Coxswain West manoeuvred the lifeboat to the exposed port side of the ship were a rope was hanging over the side. West steered the lifeboat in to the ship's side and held position whilst the crew slid down the rope to safety on the lifeboat. Within ten minutes of the extraction the ship sank below the waves. For their parts in this rescue, both Coxswain West of Sheringham and Coxswain William Cox of Wells were accorded the "Thanks of the Institution on Vellum".

=== SS Wimbledon ===
On 31 October Foresters Centenary was called out to the SS Wimbledon. The coastguard called for service to the steam collier at 8.25am. The Wimbledon was taking in water about 13 miles north-west of Cromer and was requesting assistance. The SS Wimbledon's sister ship, SS Sydenham, reported to the coastguard that she was going to her aid. Two other ships in the vicinity, Blythe and Eleanor Brook were also standing by. The SS Wimbledon radioed the coastguard to report that her pumps could not control the rising water level and that she planned to beach at Blakeney. With this turn of events the Foresters Centenary was placed on standby but almost immediately the mate of the Wimbledon reported that her master had been washed overboard. The master's body was picked up by the Eleanor Brook. The SS Wimbledon was laden with coal and was down at the bow and in severe difficulty. The chief officer who had assumed command decided not to beach the ship but to anchor in the lee at Blakeney outfalls.

==== Position of the wreck of the SS Wimbledon today ====
- 53°1.75′N 0°55′E at a depth of 13 m (43 ft).

Well dispersed with hardly anything showing out of the sand.

==== The rescue begins ====
The decision was also made to transfer some of the 18 man crew. Foresters Centenary transferred eight of the crew to the nearby Blythe, as the coxswain did not wish to risk their lives in subsequent approaches to the stricken ship that she would undoubtedly have to make. Coxswain West also radioed that the lifeboat's fuel supply was running low and the Wells lifeboat Cecil Paine was launched to the Eleanor Brook to collect the seriously ill master and to deliver fuel to the Foresters Centenary. In the meantime a helicopter from RAF Horsham St Faith had landed a doctor aboard the Eleanor Brook to attend to the master. The doctor made attempts to resuscitate the master but this proved unsuccessful and he was pronounced dead. The Wells lifeboat arrived and collected the doctor and the dead master, re-fuelled the Foresters Centenary, and then returned to her station.

==== Abandon ship ====
By 1:00pm the Wimbledon was settling lower in the water with seas washing over the deck and up to her bridge. After another hour had passed, the chief officer was persuaded to abandon ship. By this time the north-east gale was blowing at gale force eight and with a full flood tide giving no shelter on either side of the ship. By now only the aft part of the Wimbledon was above water. Coxswain West steered the Foresters Centenary alongside the ship and ropes were attached which allowed two more of the crew to be rescued, one of whom had sustained a head injury. Then this rope snapped and again the lifeboat approached and made fast with new ropes and rescued a further two men, before the ropes broke. Three men were rescued on the third attempt before the ropes snapped and the lifeboat was swept away from the stricken ship. Coxswain West was forced to drive the lifeboat onto the submerged deck of the Wimbledon and the lifeboat's motor mechanic Edward Craske fought to work the engine controls under the small canopy as required by the coxswain even though he was often up to his armpits in water. On Foresters Centenary's final approach two metres of the lifeboat's port fender were ripped off, but the last three men were finally rescued just before the ship finally sank below the waves. The sea conditions had deteriorated and conditions at Sheringham were reported very poor and since it was fast becoming dark, the lifeboat set course for Wells harbour which was reached by 4pm.

==== Recognition ====
For the rescue of the eighteen men from SS Wimbledon on 31 October 1956 Coxswain Henry West was awarded the RNLI's Silver Medal and Motor Mechanic Edward Craske the Bronze Medal, both for gallantry. The RNLI's "Thanks on Vellum" were awarded to Acting second Coxswain H. Bishop, Acting Bowman A. Scotter, Assistant Mechanic J.H. Bishop; members of the crew, D. Little, S. Little and R. West. A letter of thanks was sent to the head launcher D. Cooper.

== Final years ==
The rest of the 1950s were still as busy as usual on this part of the coast with the lifeboat called out on numerous occasions. 1960 was the last year that Foresters Centenary was on station at Sheringham. In this year the lifeboat was called upon three times. One of these rescues on 16 April was to a local fishing boat called Windsor Rose which was trying to return home in worsening weather conditions. The Foresters Centenary towed the boat home to Sheringham. This fishing boat can now be seen on display in the Sheringham Museum, The Mo, across the display hall from where the Foresters Centenary is displayed.

=== Last service ===
The lifeboat's last service at Sheringham occurred on 13 January 1961 when Foresters Centenary went out with both the Cromer and Wells lifeboats to search for an RAF Vampire (T11 XD431) of the Flying Training Command. The pilot, following engine malfunction, radioed his base with his intention to eject somewhere over the Wash. No trace of the pilot or aircraft were found and the search was called off after thirty hours without success.

=== Disposal ===
The Foresters Centenary left the station on 2 July 1961. With Coxswain Henry West at the helm she was sailed around the east coast down to Oulton Broad. Here she was taken out of the water and was sold for £830 to a Mr R C W Baker of Wells next the Sea. From then on she was used around the Essex coast. During the 1970s and 1980s she changed hands several times. By 1995 she was back in North Norfolk but now in storage in Aylsham. On 14 August 1999 The National Historic Ships Committee added the Foresters Centenary to the National Register of Historic Vessels (Certificate no 1768) In 2002 she was moved to the planned site of the new Sheringham Museum to be called The Mo. Here she was joined by another Sheringham Lifeboat J C Madge (ON 536). In May 2009 The Manchester Unity of Oddfellows (ON 960) lifeboat joined the collection. All three lifeboats are now on permanent display at the museum.

== Service and rescues ==
Foresters Centenary ON786
Date	Casualty	Lives saved
1936
7 August	Fishing boat Liberty II and Edna, of Sheringham, escorted back to port	
19 August	Small boat, of West Runton, Saved Boat	1
20 September	Motor Vessel Karanan of Rotterdam, Stood By	
1937
7 August	Motor vessel John M, of London, Stood by	
1939
22 April	Fishing boat Reliance II, of Sheringham, escorted	
27 April	Fishing boat Oliver, of Sheringham, escorted	
1940
9 February	Steamship Boston Trader, of Great Yarmouth.	
1 March	Boat of the steamship Jevington Court, of London, saved boat	
2 March	Drifting buoy, danger to navigation, saved buoy	
22 April	Auxiliary barge yacht Mahelah, of London	4
1 September	British aircraft, salved gear and wreckage	
21 October	British Aircraft	5
1941
5 April	Fishing boat of Sheringham, saved boat	5
27 October	British aircraft with Polish crew	5
30 October	Steamship Eaglescliffe Hall, of Montreal	15
31 October	Steamship Eaglescliffe Hall, gave help	
1941
1 February	British aircraft, salved wreckage	
15 March	HMS Vortigern, picked up a body	
30 July	Aircraft, recovered body	
17 October	HM Trawler Cap d'Antifer, (677) landed a sick man	
30 October	Aircraft	6
1943
13 May	USAF aircraft, picked up a body	
24 August	Smack Our Need, of Lowestoft, gave help	
1944
17 September	Admiralty Motor Fishing Vessel of the MFV 601 class, gave help	
1945
3 April	Fishing boat Gwendoline, of Sheringham, gave help	
August 16	Lifeboat Henry Ramey Upcher, of Sheringham, gave help	
9 December	Steamship Lady Sophia, of London, gave help	
1946
24 May	Three fishing boats, of Sheringham, escorted	
10 December	Motor vessel Bilsdale, of Middlesbrough, escorted	
1947
14 September	Steam tanker El Morro of Portland, Oregon, stood by	
21 September	Motor ketch yacht Livre, of Burnham on Crouch, saved yacht	2
1948
6 February	Three fishing boats, of Sheringham, escorted	
1949
22 April	Six fishing boats, of Sheringham, gave help	
3 May	Steam tanker Barren Hill, of Panama, stood by	
4 May	Steam tanker Barren Hill, of Panama, stood by	
1950
11 September	Sailing yacht Gaia, saved yacht	4
22 September	Sailing yacht Miranda, saved yacht	2
31 December	Motor vessel Johanne Te Velde, of Delfzijl, gave help	
1951
7 May	Four fishing boats, of Sheringham, escorted	
27 August	Dinghy Meringue	2
27 August	Motor Boat, saved boat	
1953
29 June	Three fishing boats, of Sheringham, escorted	
1954
6–7 November	Motor trawler Swinoujscie Czajk of Gdynia, stood by and gave help	
8 December	Motor barge Gold, of Rochester, landed 2 from steamship Rota	
9 December	Motor barge Gold, of Rochester, assisted to save barge	
1955
19 May	Steamship Zor of Istanbul	4
2 December	Motor yacht Flashing Stream, of Goole, gave help	
1956
8 June	Fishing boats, of Sheringham, escorted	
31 October	Steamship Wimbledon, of London	18
1957
31 May	Dudgeon lighthouse, landed sick man	
29 July	Motor yacht Vanesa of Rochester, saved yacht	3
30 July	Fishing boat Charlie, of Hemsby, gave help	
20 August	Cabib cruiser Sunwood, of Falmouth, saved cruiser	3
24 September	Fishing boat Windsor Rose, of Sheringham, saved boat	2
1958
31 May	Dudgeon lighthouse, landed sick man	
1959
17 April	Fishing boats Boy Billy, Our Boys and June Rose, of Sheringham, escorted	
26 June	Yacht Pleasant Mirth, gave help	
1960
16 April	Fishing boat Windsor Rose, of Sheringham, gave help and escorted	
26 June	Yacht Sulaire, of Ipswich, escorted	3
11 August	Fishing boat Enterprize, of Sheringham, gave help	

Preceded by RNLB J C Madge (ON 536)	RNLB Foresters Centenary (ON 786); 1936 to 1960	Succeeded by RNLB The Manchester Unity of Oddfellows (ON 960)
