= SS Commodore (collier) =

Wrecked British collier

Coordinates: 52.947°N 1.198°E

History
- Name: Commodore
- Owner: Hall John (1870–1878); G.W. Ward (1880–1882); Pyman, Bell & Co. (1882–1896)
- Port of registry: United Kingdom
- Builder: Wigham Richardson & Sons Ltd.
- Yard number: 62
- Launched: 1870
- Fate: Wrecked 7 November 1896

General characteristics
- Tonnage: 882 GRT
- Length: 66.9 metres (219 ft 6 in)
- Beam: 9.1 metres (29 ft 10 in)
- Depth: 5.1 metres (16 ft 9 in)
- Installed power: 95 horse power compound steam engine
- Capacity: At least 1,250 long tons (1,400 short tons) of coal
- Crew: 14 men

SS Commodore was a British-registered collier. She was built at Newcastle upon Tyne in 1870 and served with three companies. She was driven into shallow waters off Sheringham, Norfolk on 7 November 1896. Local fishermen tried to render assistance but were driven off by gale force winds. After the Commodore was driven onto rocks she sent a distress signal and the Sheringham lifeboat Henry Ramey Upcher took off all 14 crew and 3 stranded fishermen. The wreck was blown up in 1906 as a hazard to the Sheringham fishing fleet. The remains were exposed by storms in September 2021.

== Construction and service ==
The SS Commodore was built in 1870 by Wigham Richardson & Sons Ltd. in Newcastle upon Tyne, as yard number 62. She was constructed of iron and measured 66.9 metres (219 ft 6 in) in length, 9.1 metres (29 ft 10 in) in breadth and 5.1 metres (16 ft 9 in) in depth. Commodore was of 882 gross register tons (GRT). She was fitted with a 95-horsepower (71 kW) compound steam engine manufactured by R. & W. Hawthorn, Leslie and Company of Hebburn. Commodore was capable of 8.5 knots (15.7 km/h; 9.8 mph).

Commodore's original owner was Hall John and she sailed under a British registry. She remained in service with Hall John until 1878 and was sold to G.W. Ward in 1880. Ward sold her to Pyman, Bell & Co. in 1882.

== Shipwreck ==
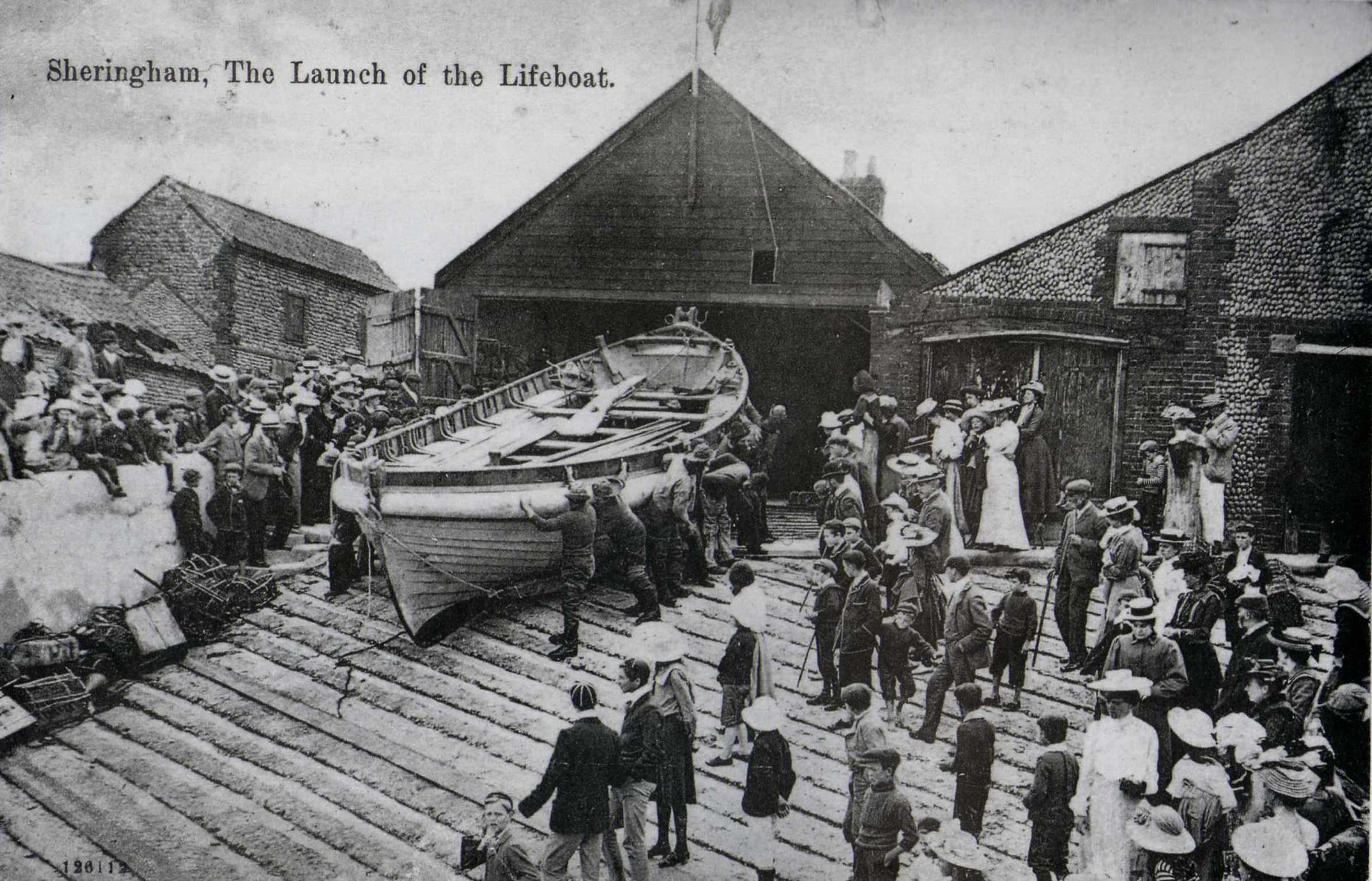
The Henry Ramey Upcher, shown being launched in 1904

On the night of 7 November 1896 Commodore was carrying 1,250 long tons (1,400 short tons) of coal from West Hartlepool to London when she was blown into shallow waters off Sheringham, Norfolk. Local fishermen saw her predicament and rowed out to render assistance. At this point the wind picked up to gale force and the fishing boats were forced to withdraw, leaving three fishermen stranded aboard Commodore. The weather was described as "very dirty and thick with rain" and Commodore was blown onto rocks. Her captain sent up distress rockets which attracted the attention of the Sheringham lifeboat, the Henry Ramey Upcher. The lifeboat safely took off Commodore's 14-man crew and the stranded fishermen.

The gale was described in newspaper reports as "a terrific storm [that] swept the east and south coasts of England". It also wrecked the schooner Tankerton Tower off Great Yarmouth, Norfolk; the schooner P. H. Dawson at Montfarville, in the English Channel, drowning her 12-man crew and forced the abandonment of the schooner Fern off Beachy Head (her crew being rescued by a passing steamer).

In 1902 the wreck of the Commodore was declared a hazard to Sheringham's fishing fleet and it was blown up by Trinity House officials. The wreck lay largely buried in sand, with some parts protruding from the seabed, in shallow waters off Sheringham's 1936 lifeboat station until September 2021 when storms scoured away sediment and revealed more of the ship's structure. This was reported on 10 September 2021 by a snorkeller and member of the lifeboat crew.
