= Henry Upcher =

Henry Upcher may refer to:

- Henry Morris Upcher (1839–1921), English naturalist and ornithologist
- Henry Ramey Upcher, private lifeboat stationed in Sheringham, Norfolk, England
