= RNLB Duncan =

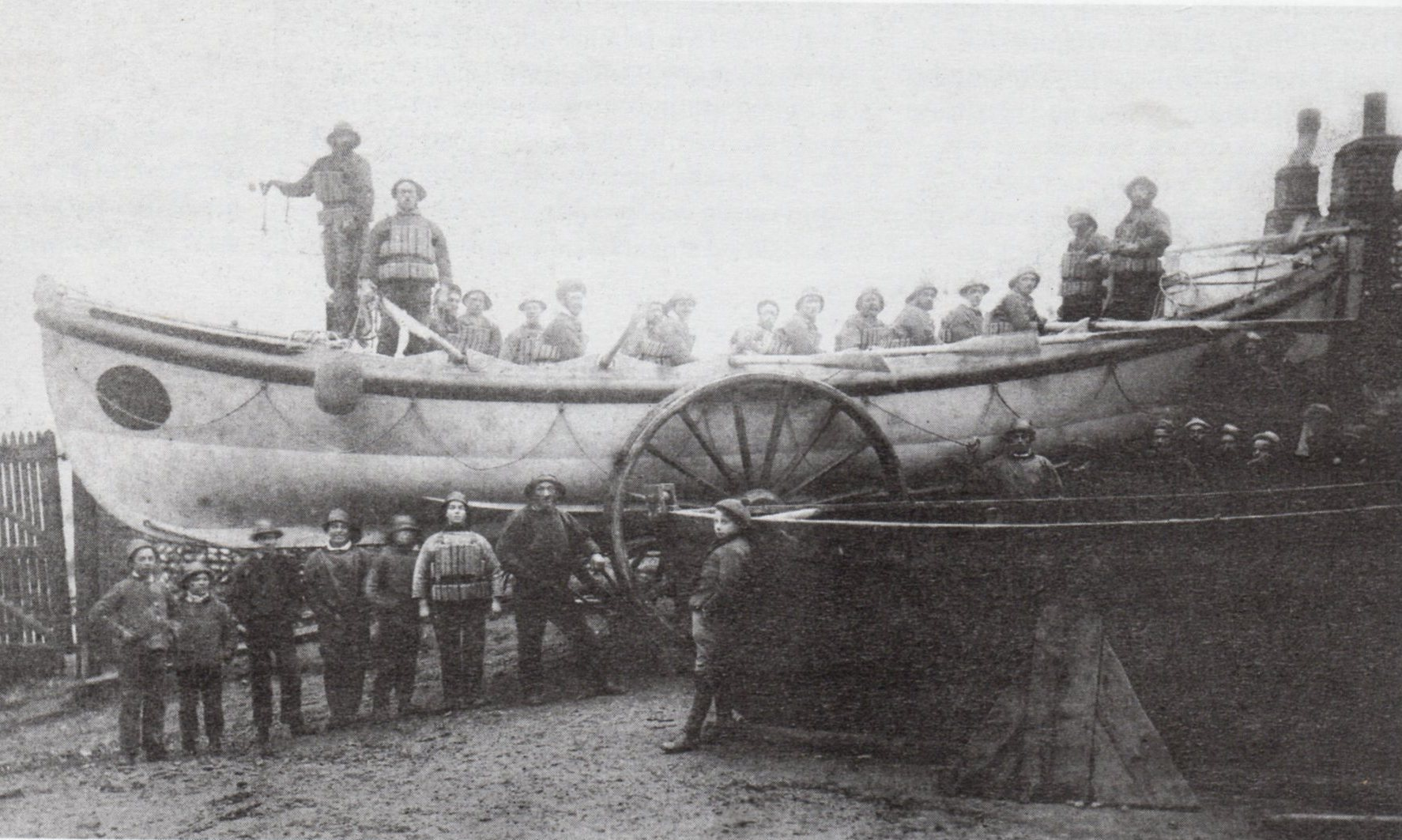
- Duncan

History

United Kingdom
- Name: Duncan
- Namesake: Named after the family of Mrs Agnes Fraser (née Duncan)
- Owner: Royal National Lifeboat Institution (RNLI)
- Builder: Forrest & Son of Limehouse
- Donor: Gift of Mrs Agnes Fraser (née Duncan) in memory of her father and uncle
- Stations: Sheringham
- Cost: £345
- Yard number: Unknown
- Acquired: 1867
- Decommissioned: 1886
- In service: 1867 to 1886

General characteristics
- Type: Self-righting type
- Length: 36 ft 0 in (10.97 m) overall
- Beam: 9 ft 0 in (2.74 m)
- Installed power: Twelve-oared

RNLB Duncan was the first RNLI lifeboat placed on station in the English coastal town of Sheringham in the county of Norfolk, United Kingdom. The arrival of this lifeboat also coincided with the construction of the first RNLI lifeboat station. The station and boat worked in conjunction with the already established private Fishermans lifeboat station also in the town.

== Expansion ==
In the mid-1850s the RNLI had been reformed and renamed and plans were made to expand the service around the country. During their expansion in the 1850s and 1860s the institution began to integrate many of the local and private life saving organisations which had sprung up around the country. The institution also developed new improved designs of lifeboats. This included the newly developed self-righting lifeboat and the RNLI planned to place a new station and lifeboat in the town of Sheringham. Surprisingly there was no plan to integrate the private fisherman's lifeboat association, leaving Sheringham in the unusual situation of having two lifeboat services.

=== The new station ===
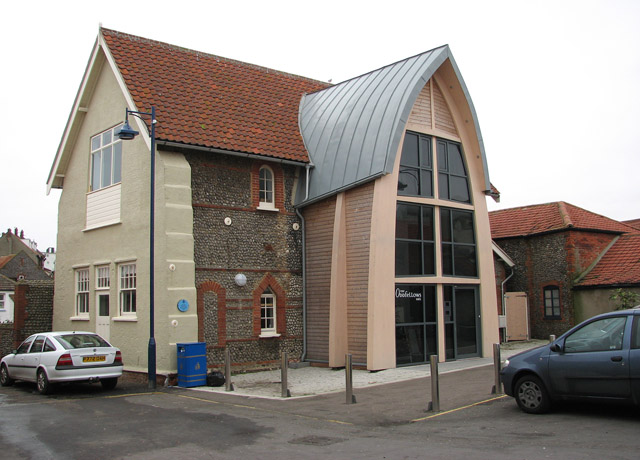
The old lifeboat station at East Cliff, now called the Oddfellows Hall

In April 1866 the RNLI sent their assistant inspector to Sheringham to assess the situation in the town. Captain David Robertson made his recommendation for a station to be placed within the town. He also met members of the Upcher family who had already provided funds and organisation for the existing fisherman's lifeboat. Henry Upcher came to an agreement to provide land at East Cliff, opposite a coal yard for the construction of a lifeboat station. The cost was £251 and was built by J Francis of Cromer. The station was completed by 1867 and was of brick construction complete with a lecture room on the second floor. The station was situated behind an area called The Mo (The site today occupied by Sheringham Museum, called The Mo) and a long timber slipway was built from the promenade down to the beach.

=== The new lifeboat ===
The new lifeboat placed on station was called RNLB Duncan and she arrived on station on 31 July 1867 and had arrived from the boatyard of T&W Forestt of Limehouse in London by train completing the final stage by road. With the lifeboat came a launch carriage and she was first launched from Sheringham on the next day. Funding for the new lifeboat was provided from the gift of Mrs Agnes Fraser (née Duncan) and was made in the memory of her father and uncle.

=== Description ===
The new lifeboat was of a self-righting, pulling and sailing type and was 36 ft 0 in (10.97 m) in length and a beam of 9 ft 0 in (2.74 m). The design encompassed air cases for reserve buoyancy, a low centre of gravity (iron drop keel), the ability to self-bail (relieving valves) and water ballast tanks which gave the lifeboat stability and the ability to self-right achieved as a result of the combination of these features.

== Service ==
The Duncan was on station at Sheringham for a total of nineteen years between 1867 and 1877 and during that time she was launched to seven effective rescues. This record was affected by the difficulties that soon became apparent, of launching the lifeboat from its ill-conceived positioning at East Cliff. During this period launch access to the sea was never easy and frequent repair and alterations were needed to the launch route and gangway. On several occasions the gangway was damaged and swept away by the stormy seas. In 1877 the gangway was so badly damaged that it required re-building. The private lifeboat Augusta which also served the town at this time was much lighter which gave her an advantage when launches were required in inclement weather. The Augusta would often be afloat long before the Duncan and so was able to provide assistance quicker and more often than the Duncan, nonetheless the RNLI lifeboat was well liked by the fishermen and crews of Sheringham.

=== First service ===
The Duncan's first successful service took place on 3 December 1867 when she was launched to rescue the schooner Hero of Maldon. The schooner had become stranded in a north-easterly wind just of the coast close to Beeston Hill. The lifeboat, which at one point ran aground herself, saved the schooner's crew of three. Despite here grounding the RNLI's report on the rescue it was stated The behaviour of the lifeboat amidst the heavy breakers elicited the admiration of her crew, who expressed the greatest confidence in her.

=== Last service ===
The Duncan's last successful service took place on 6 December 1882 when she was launched in response to a distress signals sent out by the Swedish barque Caroline who was on her way from Hull to Trelleborg. Along with the launch of the Duncan, the Augusta was also launched. The Caroline had lost her sails and spar in the heavy weather and together the two lifeboats escorted the barque to Grimsby arriving there the following day.

=== Failure ===
On 4 October 1883 the Duncan was called to rescue the Schooner Alpha. The lifeboat was unable to be launched from her station or from an alternative launch site at East Runton to help the stricken vessel. The crews were eventually rescued from the beach. By 1885 the Duncan was a cause of concern to the towns' lifeboat men. It had become apparent to these men that the Duncan was no longer suitable. In June 1885 a meeting was arranged by the local committee of the lifeboat and fishermen. So concerned were these men that 150 men attended. A request was formulated and sent to the RNLI asking for a new lighter boat with a longer keel and wider beam that would be more suitable for the difficult launch situation in the town. Duncan was replaced in 1885 by RNLB William Bennett (ON 11).

== Coxswains of the Duncan ==
During the period of time that Duncan was on station at Sheringham there were five Coxswains and they were as follows

- Edmund 'Pye' West, 1867 to 1868
- John Grice, 1869
- William 'Buck' Craske, 1870 to 1873
- Abraham Cooper, 1874
- Robert 'Philoloo' Cooper, 1875 to 1886

== Service and rescues ==
RNLB Duncan
Date	Casualty	Lives saved
1867
3 December	Schooner Hero of Maldon	3
1869
20 March	Schooner Frances Ann of Goole.	3
19 October	Schooner Trusty of Boston	3
22 October	William Forthingham of New York City, assisted to save vessel	
1875
10 October	Fishing smack Gleaner	2
1876
14 April	Schooner Wells of Goole, saved vessel	5
1877
21 May	Fishing boat, stood by	
1882
6 December	Barque Carolina of Sweden, escorted to safety	

Preceded by None	RNLB Duncan; 1867 to 1886	Succeeded by RNLB William Bennett (ON 11)
