= Sheringham Lifeboat Station =

RNLI Lifeboat station in Norfolk, England

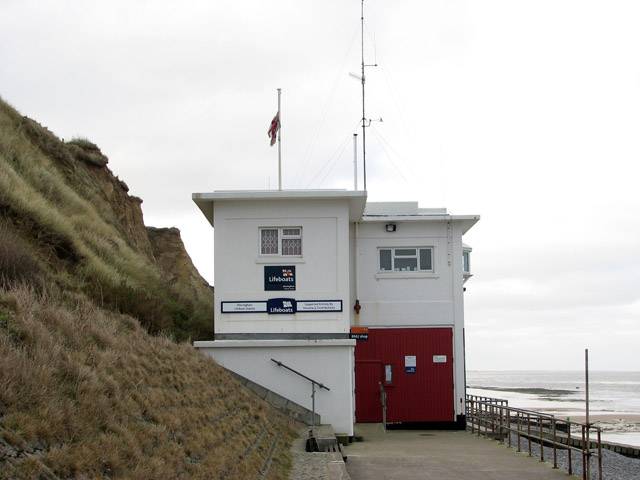
- Sheringham Lifeboat Station

- Location within Norfolk

General information
- Type: Lifeboat Station
- Location: Sheringham Lifeboat Station, The Promenade, Sheringham, Norfolk, NR26 8ZZ, England
- Coordinates: 52°56′45.3912″N 1°12′9.4968″E
- Opened: Private: 1838–1935; RNLI: 1867–present
- Owner: Royal National Lifeboat Institution

Website
- Sheringham RNLI Lifeboat Station

Sheringham Lifeboat Station is located at the western end of The Promenade in Sheringham, a town approximately 26 miles (42 km) north of Norwich, and just 5 miles (8.0 km) west of Cromer, on the north-east coast of the English county of Norfolk.

A private lifeboat was established in Sheringham in 1838, operating until 1935. A second lifeboat station was established by the Royal National Lifeboat Institution (RNLI) in 1867.

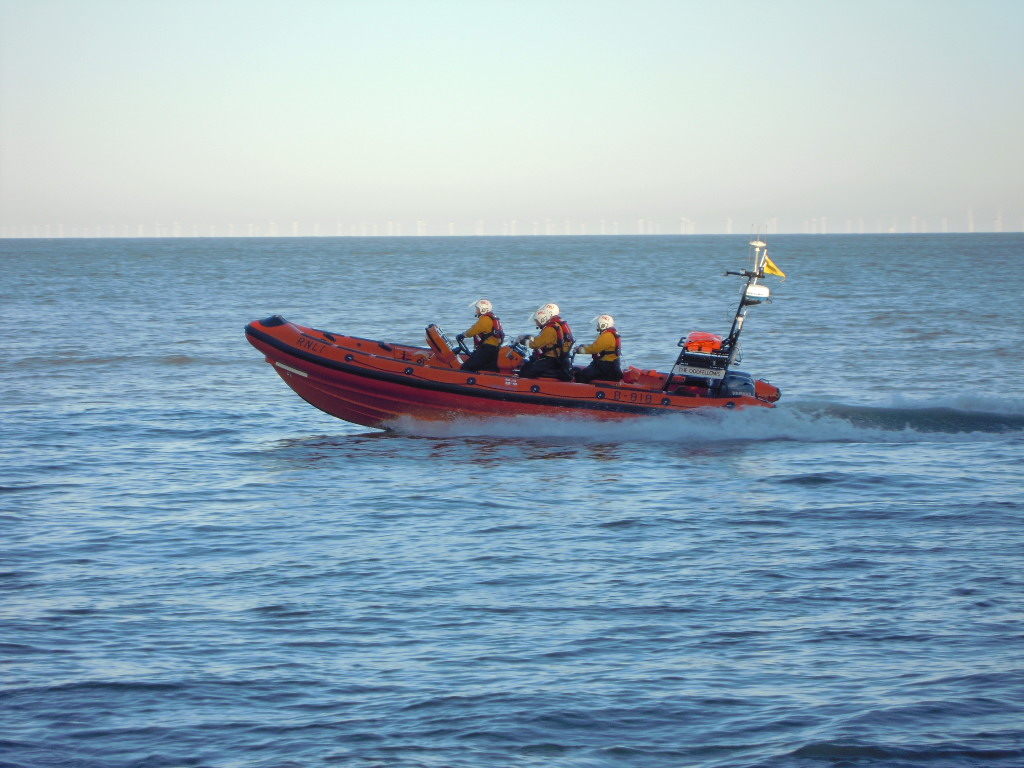
Sheringham B-class (Atlantic 85) Inshore lifeboat The Oddfellows (B-818)

Since 1992, with All-weather lifeboats to the east at Cromer, and to the west at Wells-next-the-Sea, Sheringham has operated a B-class Inshore lifeboat. The station operates the B-class (Atlantic 85) Inshore lifeboat The Oddfellows (B-818).

In December 2024, a full structural survey was undertaken of the current station, built in 1936. Once published, the findings indicated that the building may be at the end of its lifespan. This, combined with a further report that the cliff to the rear of the station may be unsafe, prompted a complete suspension of activity at the station in February 2025.

== History ==
=== Before the RNLI ===
From early times, the main source of income in the town of Sheringham had been fishing. In the late 1800s, there were upwards of 200 fishing boats operating from the Hythe and the beaches of the town. As the fishing industry flourished, the loss of life at sea increased. These recurring tragedies led the wealthy Upcher family of Sheringham Hall to donate money to enable lifeboats to be built, and their generosity founded the first lifeboat service in Sheringham.

=== First boathouse ===
In 1838 the first boathouse for the then private service, was built to house the Augusta.

=== Second boathouse ===
In April 1866, the RNLI's Assistant Inspector of Lifeboats, Captain D. Robertson, had visited the town as part of his tour of the locality, and suggested that a second station run by the RNLI be placed in Sheringham. The thinking behind this decision was that the RNLI's lifeboat would bring a different option to the life saving capacities of the town's private operation. The Inspector also met with members of the Upcher family and an agreement was made with Henry Upcher to provide land for an RNLI boathouse at East Cliff, close to the town centre.

Once the site had been agreed, work began to build the station, at a cost of £251. The building was of a brick construction, and was arranged over two floors, with the main boat hall at ground level and a lecture room above on the first floor. Public funds were raised to add the first floor, reached by an outside staircase, which was also used as a reading room where fishermen could rest and be educated in their free time.

The route from the boat hall led past the area known as The Mo, across the promenade and onto a long timber constructed slipway. The boathouse was completed and became operational in 1867. The location proved to be unsuccessful as the access route to the sea was never straightforward and during the thirty four years that the lifeboat operated from this location, many costly repairs were made often due to the gangway being swept away in gales and high tides.

=== Third boathouse ===
By 1904, a new boathouse and slipway had been constructed at the Old Hythe. The old boathouse (The Oddfellows Hall) on Lifeboat Plain was then given over to several uses, eventually standing idle and neglected, until it was refurbished in 2007, at a cost of £2.5 million, to bring it back to use for the community.

=== Gallery of the stations ===
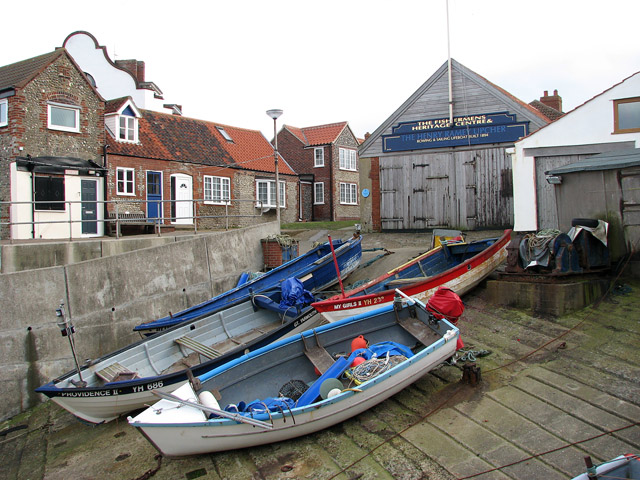
The first lifeboat house.

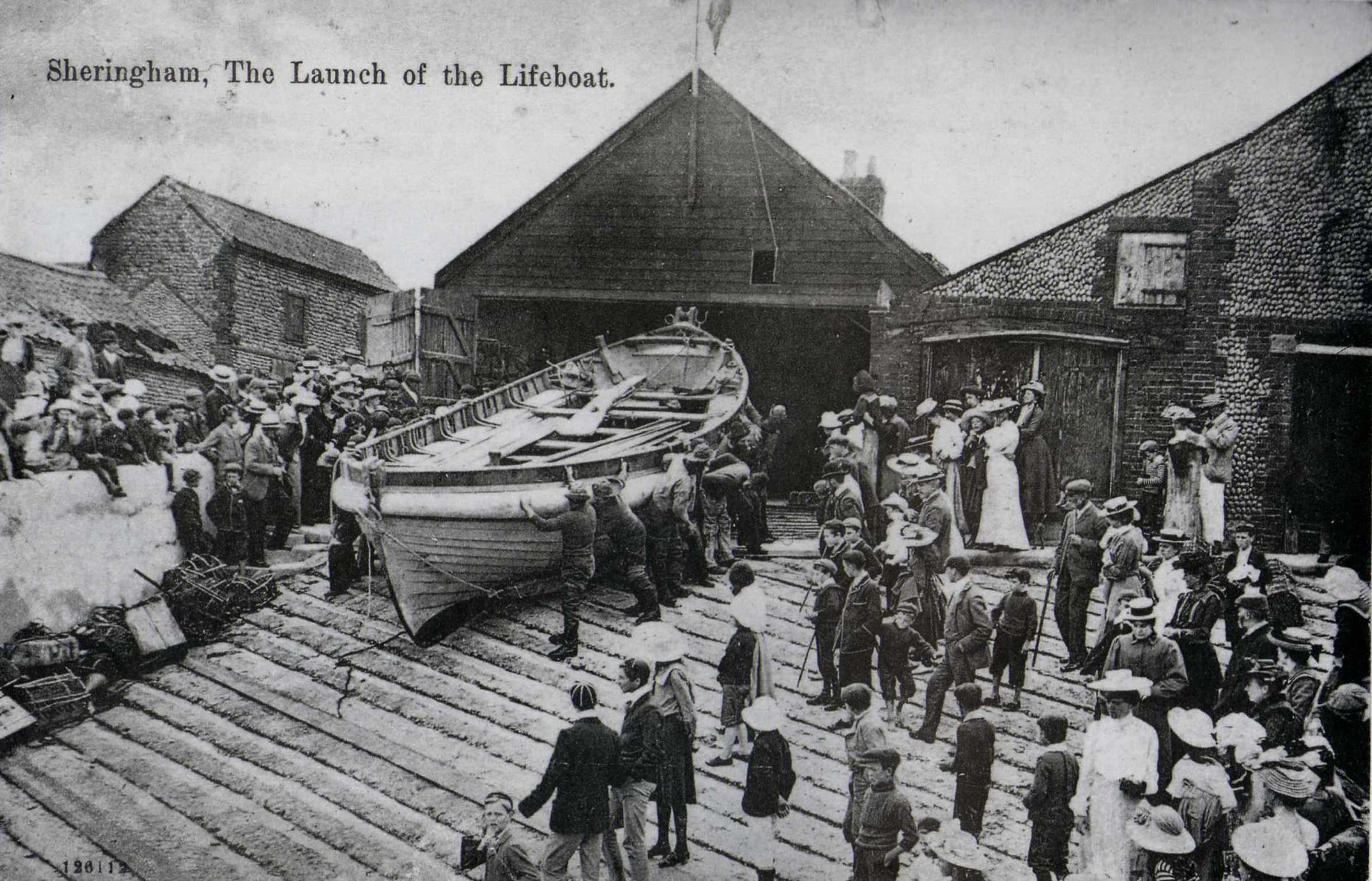
Postacard of the Henry Ramey Upcher outside the first boathouse circa 1904

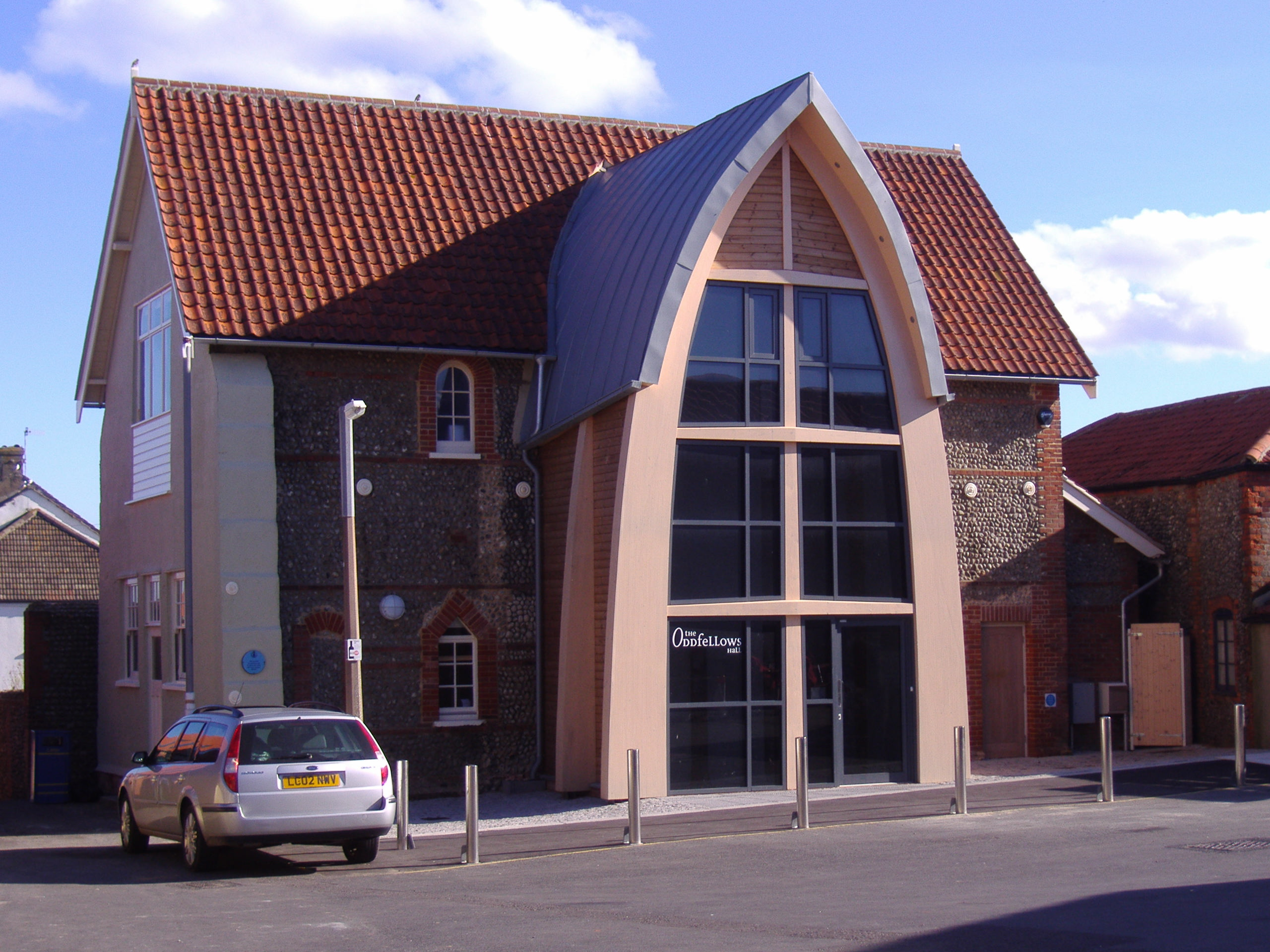
The first RNLI boathouse on Lifeboat Plain in Sheringham.

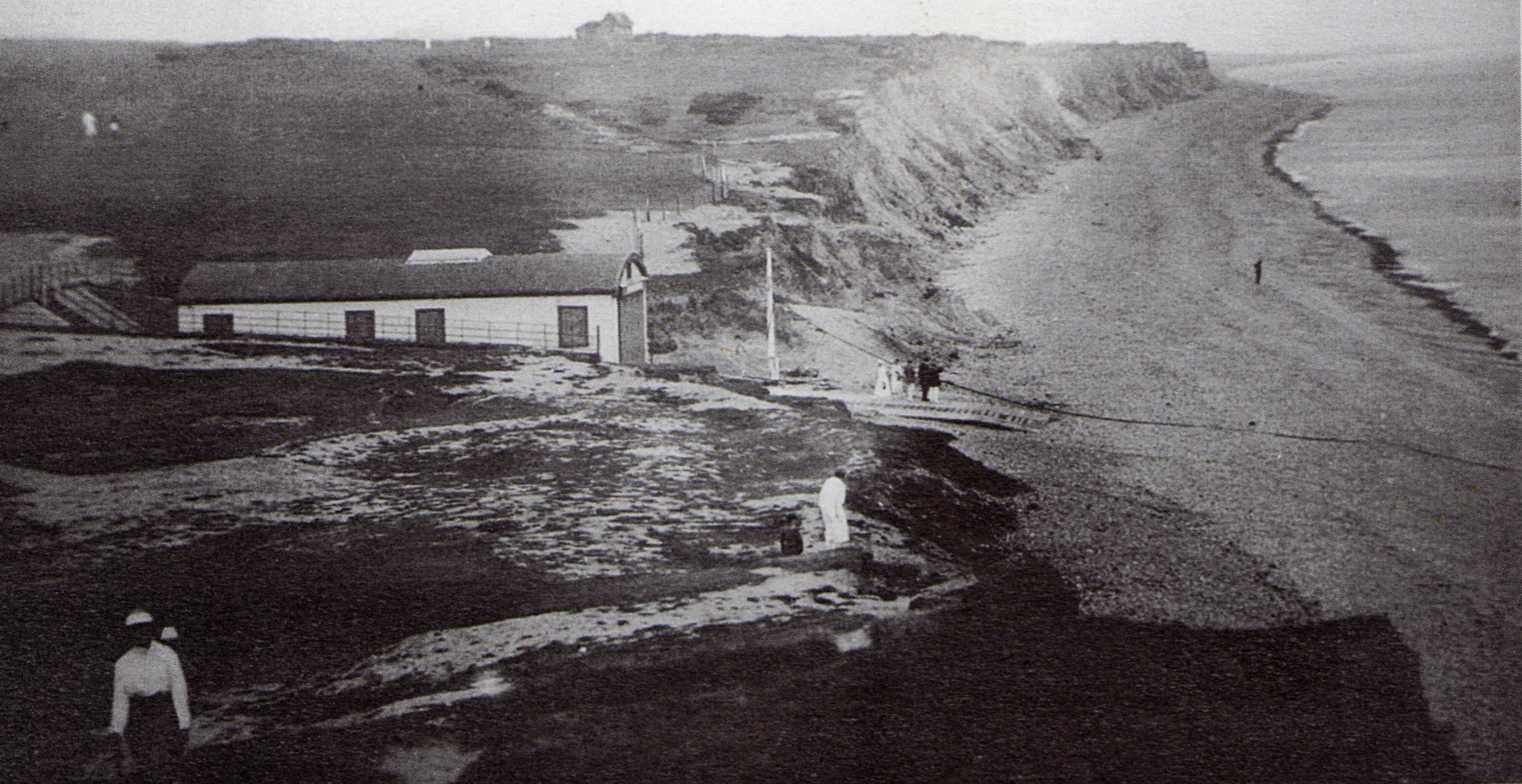
The second RNLI boathouse at Old Hythe (circa 1904)

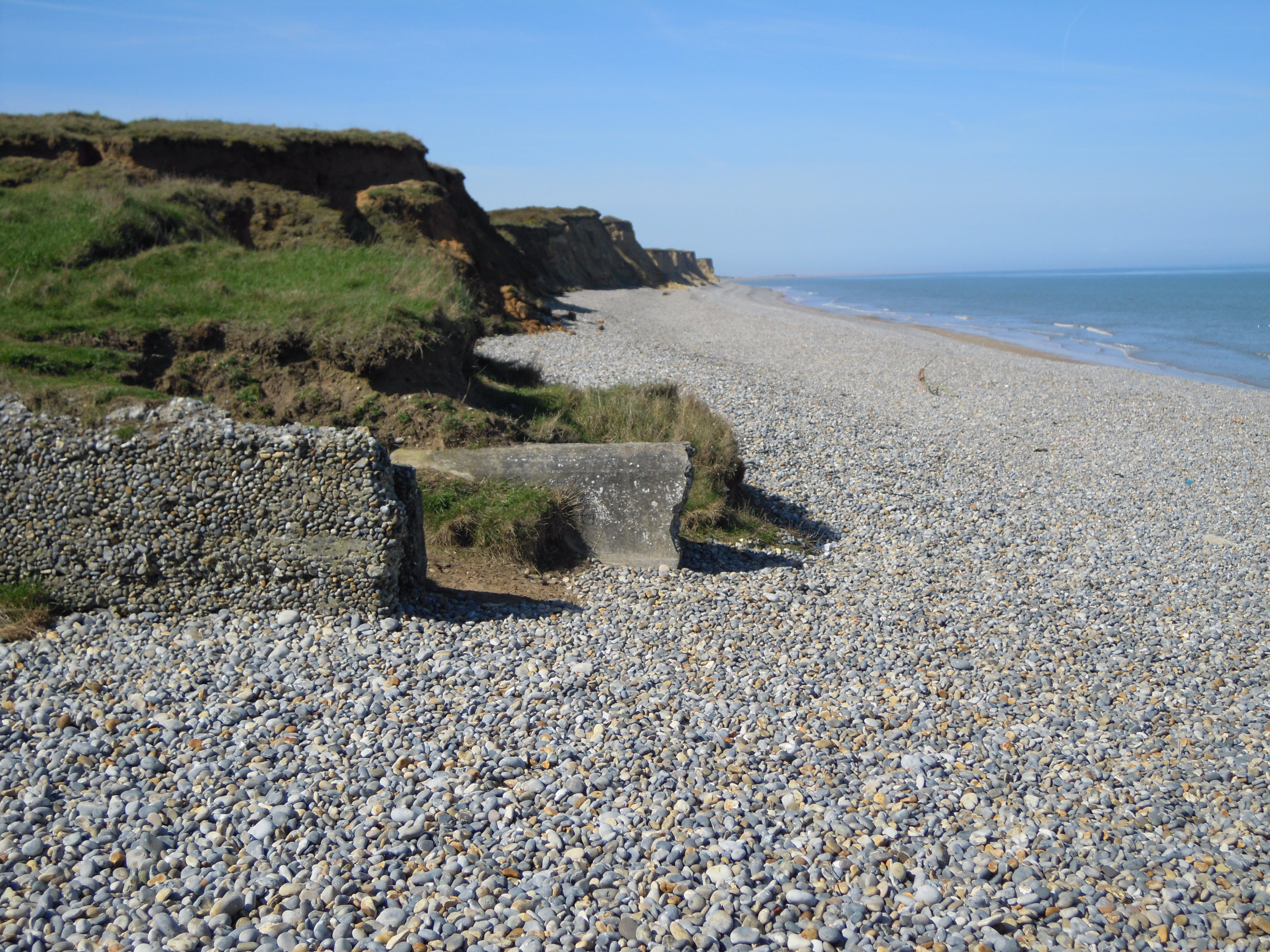
All that remains of the Old Hythe boathouse today (2010)

== Station honours ==
The following are awards made at Sheringham

- RNLI Silver Medal
  Henry 'Downtide' West, Coxswain – 1956
- RNLI Bronze Medal
  James Edward Dumble, Coxswain – 1941
  Edward Craske, Motor Mechanic – 1956
- James Michael Bower Endowment Fund Award
  made to those who receive either the Gold or Silver Medal of the Institution for gallantry
  Henry West, Coxswain – 1956 (First co-recipient of this award)
- The Thanks of the Institution inscribed on Vellum
  Henry 'Downtide' West, Coxswain – 1955
  H. Bishop – 1956
  A. Scotter – 1956
  J. H. Bishop – 1956
  D. Little – 1956
  R. Little – 1956
  R. West – 1956
  Henry 'Downtide' West, Coxswain – 1961
  Henry 'Joyful' West, Second Coxswain – 1961
  Arthur Scotter, Bowman – 1961
  Henry Wink, Signalman – 1961
- British Empire Medal
  Robert Henry West – 1982QBH
  Brian Joefred Pegg, Coxswain Mechanic – 1989QBH
- Member, Order of the British Empire (MBE)
  John William Burgess – 1996NYH
  Mary Estelle Blyth – 2005NYH

== Sheringham lifeboats ==
=== Augusta ===
The first lifeboat to serve Sheringham was the privately funded Augusta. The boat was provided by Mrs Charlotte Upcher of Sheringham Hall at a cost of £134-12s-2d. Mrs Upcher had been, for sometime, concerned with the appalling loss of life during severe gales along the East coast and in particular the gale of 29 November 1826. During this brutal storm seven Sheringham fishermen were lost when their two boats overturned just offshore. Then, in January 1838, a large Sheringham fishing boat known locally as a "twenty footer" was damaged and sunk on Sheringham Shoal. These incidents prompted the establishment of the lifeboat service in Sheringham. The new lifeboat was built by Robert Sunman in the style of the local crab fishing boats. It was launched in November 1838 and was named Augusta after Mrs Upcher's recently deceased daughter. Augusta was 33 feet 6 inches long and 10 foot 3 inches wide. The power for the boat was provide by 16 oars. She was equipped with a dipping lug mainsail, mizzen sail and had fittings for a rudder at either end to avoid turning her in heavy seas.

By 1894, the Augusta was declared unseaworthy. In the late 1940s she was being used by the Norfolk Sea Scouts on the Norfolk Broads. By 1953 the now derelict lifeboat was found, cut in half and being used as a shelter at the Broads village of Ranworth. In recent years some of the Augusta's original planking has been preserved in a tank in Sheringham by a local businessman.

=== Henry Ramey Upcher ===
Uniquely Sheringham has had in the past two lifeboat services running at the same time, one private and the other operated by the RNLI. The lifeboat Henry Ramey Upcher was the boat of the private service. This lifeboat was the gift of Mrs. Caroline Upcher of Sheringham Hall, donated to the fishermen in memory of Mrs. Upcher's husband.

The Henry Ramey Upcher launched to over 50 services and she worked closely with the lifeboats, William Bennett and J.C. Madge of the RNLI. She remained in service until 1935 and she saved over 200 souls. Today the Henry Ramey Upcher lifeboat is preserved in original condition in her own museum which is housed in the original lifeboat shed at the top of the slipway at Old Hythe.

=== Duncan ===
The lifeboat Duncan was the first RNLI boat to serve at the new Sheringham station. She came to the town on 31 July 1867 and had been built at the cost of £345 with this expenditure cost being met by a donation from Mrs. Agnes Fraser, née Duncan, in memory of her father and uncle. The lifeboat had been designed by James Peake and built by Forrestt of Limehouse, London. Duncan was 36 feet long and 9 foot 4 inches wide and was self-righting by virtue of her heavy iron keel and high end boxes. She was supplied with 12 oars and a single mast with sail.

During the 19 years that Duncan was at Sheringham she was called to make 7 service launches and saved 18 lives.

=== William Bennett (ON 11) ===
Lifeboat William Bennett (ON 11) was the successor to Duncan. She arrived by sea at Sheringham on 7 July 1886. This lifeboat, like her predecessor, was built by Forrestt of Limehouse, London. At 41-foot 4in, she was 5 feet longer than the Duncan. She was 9-foot 3in wide and was powered by 14 oars and was a self-righting design. This boat cost £500-13s-10d and was funded from the legacy of Mr William Bennett, a wealthy tea merchant, of Regent's Park, London. The larger lifeboat however was of no advantage to the Sheringham crew. She was considerably heavier than the Duncan and the narrow access from the boathouse to the slipway made the William Bennett a very difficult boat to launch.

During the 18 years that William Bennett was stationed at Sheringham, the lifeboat only made four successful service launches, but saved 11 lives.

=== J C Madge (ON 536) ===
The lifeboat J C Madge (ON 536) replaced the William Bennett (ON 11) in 1904. This lifeboat was a Liverpool class, non-self righting, pulling and sailing lifeboat. She cost £1,436 and was funded from a legacy left by Mr James C. Madge, a chemist, who came from Southampton. J C Madge (ON 536) arrived in Sheringham on 2 December 1904 having been sailed around the coast from Blackwall Reach in east London.

=== Private lifeboats ===
Name	Built	On station	Class	Comments	Image
Augusta	1836	1838–1894	33-foot Non-self-righting	(Note: 33-foot x 10-foot 3in (14-oared) non-self-righting lifeboat, gift of the Hon. Mrs Charlotte Upcher, built by Sunman of Sheringham, costing £150.)	
Henry Ramey Upcher	1894	1894–1935	34-foot Non-self-righting	(Note: 34-foot 8in x 11-foot 3in non-self-righting lifeboat, gift of the Hon. Mrs Charlotte Upcher, built by L. Emery of Sheringham.); Preserved at Sheringham.	

=== RNLI lifeboats ===
==== Pulling and Sailing (P&S) lifeboats ====
ON (Note: ON is the RNLI's Official Number of the boat.)	Name	Built	On station	Class	Comments	Image
Pre-506	Duncan	1867	1867–1886	36-foot Self-righting (P&S)	(Note: 36 ft 8 in (11.18 m) x 11 ft 3 in (3.43 m) (12-oared) self-righting (P&S) lifeboat, gift of Miss A. Duncan of Bath, built by Forrestt of Limehouse, London, costing £345.)	
11	William Bennett	1886	1886–1904	41-foot 4in Self-righting (P&S)	(Note: 41 ft 4 in (12.60 m) x 9 ft 3 in (2.82 m) (14-oared) self-righting (P&S) lifeboat, legacy of Mr W. Bennett of Regent's Park, built by Forrestt of Limehouse, London, costing £501.)	
536	J. C. Madge	1904	1904–1936	41-foot Liverpool (P&S)	(Note: 41 ft 4 in (12.60 m) x 11 ft (3.4 m) (16-oared) self-righting (P&S) lifeboat, legacy of Mr J. C. Madge of Southampton, built by Thames Ironworks of Blackwall, London, costing £1,436.); Preserved at Sheringham.	

Pre ON numbers are unofficial numbers used by the Lifeboat Enthusiasts' Society to reference early lifeboats not included on the official RNLI list.

==== Motor lifeboats ====
ON	Op. No. (Note: Op. No. is the RNLI's Operational Number of the boat carried on the hull.)	Name	Built	On station	Class	Comments	Image
786	–	Forester's Centenary	1936	1936–1961	Liverpool	Preserved at Sheringham.	
960	37-02	The Manchester Unity of Oddfellows	1961	1961–1990	37-foot Oakley	Preserved at Sheringham.	
986	37-19	Lloyds II	1966	1990–1992	37-foot Oakley	Previously at Ilfracombe	

==== D-class Inshore lifeboats ====
Op. No.	Name	On station	Class	Comments
D-204	Unnamed	1986	D-class (RFD PB16)	First stationed at Tenby in 1972.

==== B-class Inshore lifeboats ====
Op. No.	Name	On station	Class	Comments
B-536	Unnamed	1992–1994	B-class (Atlantic 21)	First stationed at Peel in 1976.
B-539	Lions International District 105 SE	1994	B-class (Atlantic 21)	First stationed at Brighton in 1976.
B-702	Manchester Unity of Oddfellows	1994–2007	B-class (Atlantic 75)	
B-818	The Oddfellows	2007–	B-class (Atlantic 85)	

==== Launch and recovery tractors ====
Op. No.	Reg. No.	Type	On station	Comments
T15	FU 4892	Clayton	1949–1950	
T55	KXX 565	Case LA	1950–1958	
T52	KXT 420	Case LA	1958–1960	
T68	YUV 742	Fowler Challenger III	1960–1968	
T64	PXF 575	Fowler Challenger III	1968–1978	
T62	PLA 698	Fowler Challenger III	1978–1980	
T64	PXF 575	Fowler Challenger III	1980–1982	
T68	YUV 742	Fowler Challenger III	1982–1984	
T64	PXF 575	Fowler Challenger III	1984–1986	
T98	C168 NAW	Talus MB-H Crawler	1986–1992	
TW15	E592 WNT	Talus MB-764 County	1992–1994	
TW24H	K313 ENT	Talus MB-4H Hydrostatic (Mk2)	1994–2005	
TW22H	K501 AUX	Talus MB-4H Hydrostatic (Mk2)	2005–2015	
TW37H	P898 CUX	Talus MB-4H Hydrostatic (Mk2)	2015–2017	
TW46H	V938 EAW	Talus MB-4H Hydrostatic (Mk1.5)	2017–2022	
TW27H	M741 RUX	Talus MB-4H Hydrostatic (Mk2)	2022–	

== See also ==
- Historic RNLI lifeboats
- List of RNLI stations
- List of former RNLI stations
