= RNLB William Bennett =

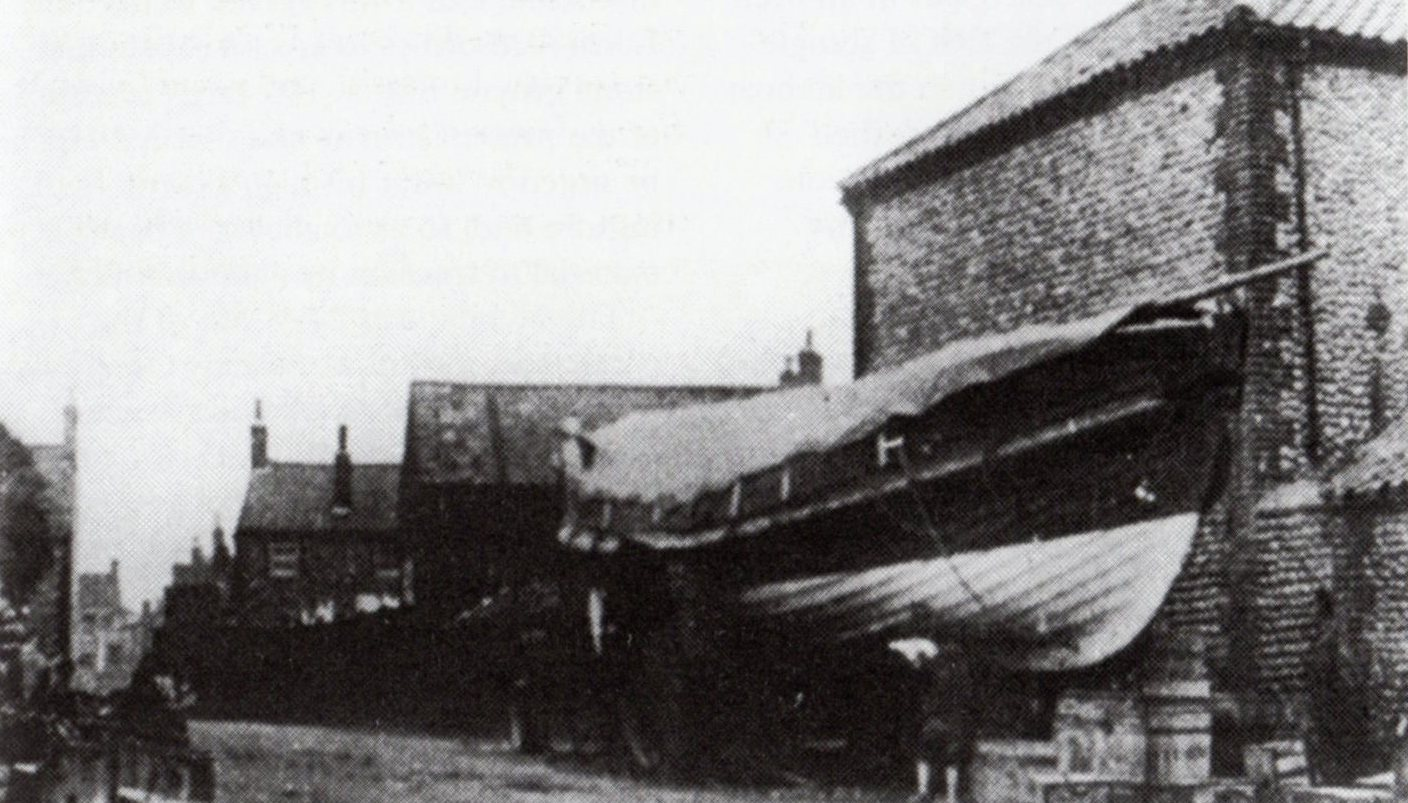
- RNLB William Bennett (ON 11)

History

United Kingdom
- Name: William Bennett
- Namesake: Named after William Bennett, of Regent's Park, London
- Owner: Royal National Lifeboat Institution (RNLI)
- Builder: Forrest & Son of Limehouse
- Official Number: ON 11
- Donor: Legacy of William Bennett, of Regent's Park, London who was a dealer of Tea
- Stations: Sheringham
- Cost: £500 13s 10d
- Yard number: Unknown
- Acquired: 1886
- Decommissioned: 1904
- In service: 1886 to 1904
- Fate: Condemned and sold locally in December 1904

General characteristics
- Class & type: Clinker built
- Type: Self-righting
- Tonnage: 6 tons 10cwt
- Length: 41 ft 0 in (12.50 m) overall
- Beam: 9 ft 3 in (2.82 m)
- Draught: 4 ft 4 in (1.32 m)
- Installed power: Fourteen-oared and Sail

RNLB William Bennett (ON 11) was the second RNLI lifeboat to be stationed at the English seaside town of Sheringham in the county of Norfolk. She served the North Norfolk coast from 1886 until 1904. Her time at Sheringham was notorious for the difficulties she had during launch and retrieval to the lifeboat station which at this time was awkwardly placed in the centre of town.

== New replacement ==
By 1885 the town's old lifeboat was a cause of concern to the town's lifeboat men. It had become apparent to these men that the Duncan, which had been the first RNLI lifeboat to be stationed in the town, was no longer suitable. In June 1885 a meeting was arranged by the local committee of the lifeboat men and fishermen. So concerned were these men that 150 men attended. A request was formulated and sent to the RNLI asking for a new lighter boat with a longer keel and wider beam that would be more suitable for the difficult launch situation in the town. A month later the RNLI's Chief Inspector visited Sheringham station and recommended a new self-righting lifeboat be stationed there. In his recommendation it was stated that the lifeboat should be clench built of larch, be 41 foot long and must be pulling fourteen oars.

=== Preparation ===
To house the new lifeboat, the station in Sheringham would require some alterations and these were carried out for the cost of £50 17s. The route between the boathouse and the launch slipway also had to be widened to accommodate the new boat and so make launch a lot easier. The William Bennett had completed her harbour trial on 13 February 1886 and in July of that year she was delivered to Sheringham by sea. She arrived in Sheringham on 7 July. The new launch carriage from which the William Bennett would be launched was to be delivered to Sheringham by train, but by 7 July it had not arrived. The situation made the retrieval of the new lifeboat very difficult, a situation made worse by the failure of a new winch, which broke when it was used for the first time to retrieve the lifeboat.

=== Design ===
The William Bennett was a Clinker constructed design and had curved washboards fixed fore and aft at the end boxes of the boat to keep the sea from breaking inboard. The boat was 41 feet long and was one of the longest self-righter lifeboats in the service at that time. She was also comparatively narrow beamed at just over nine feet. The lifeboat men had asked that their new lifeboat be of a lighter design to ease the handling problems but after delivery it was found that this new lifeboat was in fact heavier than the previous lifeboat and weighed in at 6 tons 10 cwt. In the days preceding her arrival, the William Bennett underwent various launch exercises with the RNLI's Chief Inspector and various different crew members. These exercises were carried out in smooth seas and results were considered favourable. The crew soon became aware that William Bennett was going to be an awkward boat to launch and would be close to impossible in the worst conditions, a situation that would be reflected in her service record of only four launches that were recorded as successful, although she did save eleven souls.

== Service ==
William Bennett's first two service both proved to start the list of unsuccessful launches. The first was on 27 October 1887 she went to help a 3,000 ton steamship called the Dundee, from Dundee which had run aground. The ship and its cargo of grain had floated free in a floodtide before the lifeboat arrived. The second, on 23 June 1888 was to the Tay of Glasgow and once again the lifeboat failed to provide a service.

=== Successful launch ===
The first successful service took place on 20 September 1892 when she went to assist local fishermen and she saved the lives of four men.

The second launch of the William Bennett took place on 16 August 1894 and was a joint success along with Sheringham's private lifeboat Augusta. The local fishing fleet had been caught up in rough seas which had risen unexpectedly. Almost twenty of the boats needed help. William Bennett was launched in eight minutes and went out to assist the fleet collecting the fishermen whilst leaving their boats at anchor outside the breakers. The lifeboat was so overloaded with rescued men that the Augusta was launched and used to help transport the men back to Sheringham.

The lifeboat's fourth and final service was on 11 September 1903. The service was also William Bennett's severest test. The lifeboat was launched in a gale force sea. The steam yacht Asteroid of London had already been subject to one lifeboat launch by the Blakeney lifeboat, but no help was required at that time. Now the crew of the yacht had raised a distress signal. The Wells lifeboat was already at service to another ship in Holkham Bay, and the Blakeney boat had still not returned to station. The call came to Sheringham and the lifeboat was launched into a raging sea. The lifeboat was double manned in anticipation of the heavy pulling that would be need in the blowing gale. Not long after she had been at sea, a large wave crashed over the lifeboat which tore two of her oars away. The crew rowed on until she was a mile out where she then hoisted her sails. When they reached the Asteroid two of the crew went aboard to assist the yacht whose machinery had broken down. The yacht was taken into tow and was to be taken to Great Yarmouth. Just off Sheringham the lifeboat took on supplies and the two set of for Yarmouth. By the time the lifeboat had reached Cockle lightship the yacht had managed to repair her machinery and was able to complete her journey to Yarmouth under her own steam. The lifeboat and its very tired crew returned to Sheringham in the early hours of 12 September.

== Launch problems ==
During the seventeen years that William Bennett was launched from the lifeboat plain station, it became clear that the Lifeboat station was completely inadequate. Over the years, on several occasions the weather and storm force seas battered and washed away at the lifeboats launch gangway and the foreshore. This thwarted launching on many occasions. There were also disputes between local landowners and the institution. During a gale and snowstorm in January 1897 the sea washed away a section of the seawall near the lifeboat gangway leaving an eight-foot drop to the beach making launches impossible. As a consequence a new slipway was constructed at a cost of £294 4s 8d. The new slipway initially eased the launch problems but by 1899 further beach erosion had made launches impossible again. By October 1900 the station was out of action as launches were now impossible.

=== Deteriorating condition ===
With launches now impossible from the Lifeboat house, William Bennett was now left out in the open, under a tarpaulin in Beech Road. The lifeboat needed constant maintenance to keep the weather out. In 1902 the lifeboat was moved a mile up the coast to Old Hythe where there was a natural low gulley in the cliffs which was considered to be a more acceptable place to store and launch the lifeboat until a more permanent solution could be arranged.

=== New boat house ===
With the lifeboat kept outdoors, her condition fast deteriorated and parts of the boat were found to be rotten. In June 1903 at the boats triennial examination, the RNLI engineer found many defects. Repairs were carried out at a cost of £190 but this was only an interim measure as she had now been condemned. She would remain on station until a replacement was ready. Plans were also made for a new boathouse to be built at Old Hythe.

=== Disposal ===
In 1904 the William Bennett was sold out of the service to a local fisherman along with her carriage.

== Service and rescues ==
RNLB William Bennett (ON 11)
| Date | Casualty | Lives saved |
|---|---|---|
1892
| 20 September | Fishing boats of Sheringham | 4 |
1894
| 16 August | Fishing boats of Sheringham, gave help | |
1898
| 7 March | Fishing boats of Sheringham, stood by and gave help | 2 |
1903
| 11 September | Steam yacht Asteroid of London, saved yacht | 5 |

| Preceded by RNLB Duncan | RNLB William Bennett (ON 11); 1886−1904 | Succeeded by RNLB J C Madge (ON 536) |
