= RNLB J C Madge =

British lifeboat

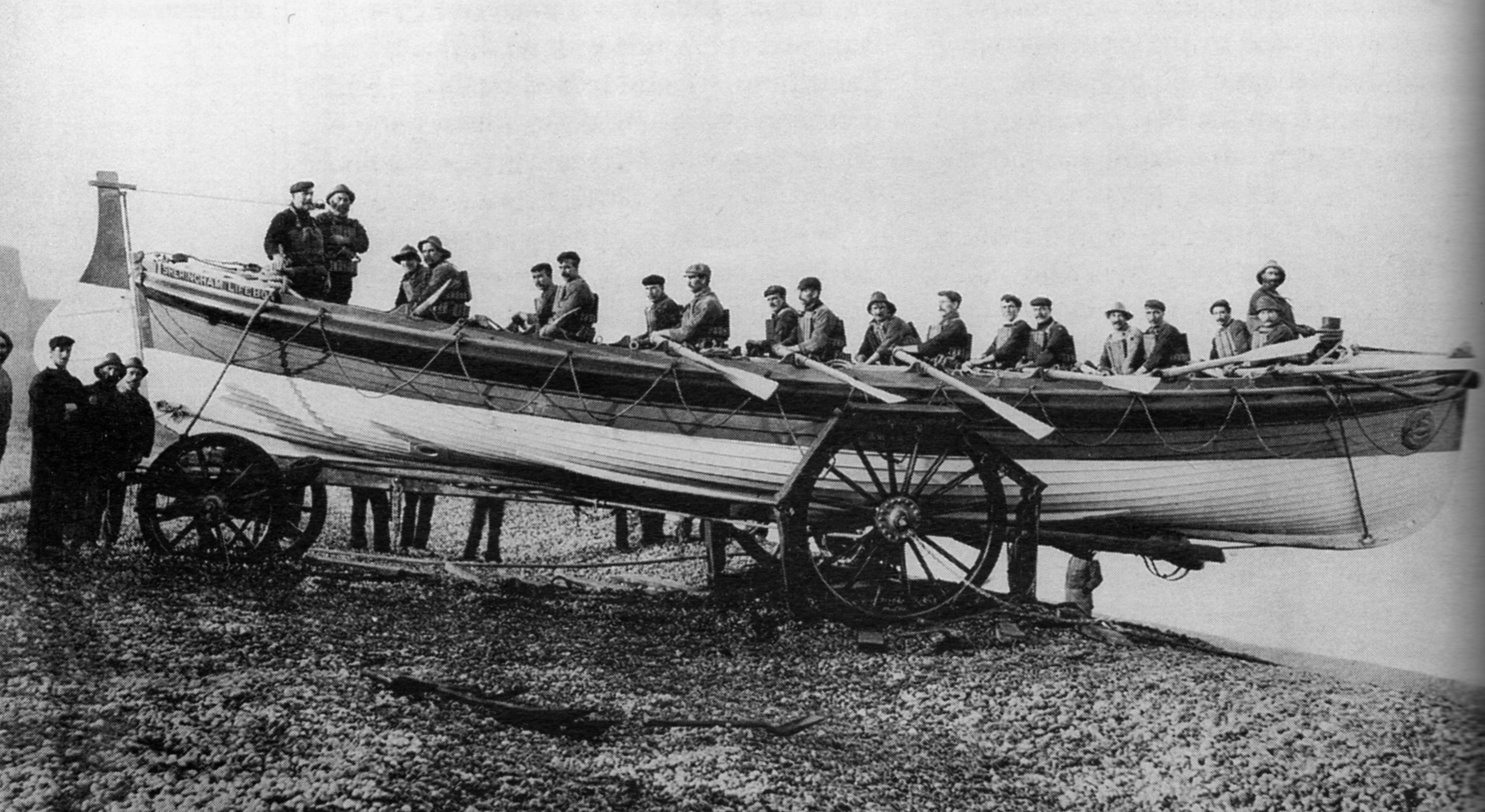
- RNLB J C Madge (ON 536)

History

United Kingdom
- Owner: Royal National Lifeboat Institution (RNLI)
- Builder: Thames Iron Works, Blackwall, London
- Official Number: ON 536
- Donor: A legacy of Mr James C. Madge of Southampton
- Station: Sheringham
- Cost: £1,435 16s 6d
- Yard number: TK68
- Launched: 30 November 1904
- Christened: 13 December 1904 by a Miss Upcher, daughter of Mr H. R. Upcher JP
- Acquired: 1904
- Commissioned: December 1904
- Decommissioned: 22 June 1936
- Fate: Sold out of service, repurchased for restoration in 1989, Now Displayed in Sheringham Museum, The Mo.

General characteristics
- Class & type: Liverpool class, Pulling & Sailing
- Type: non-self righting
- Tonnage: 5 tons 7 cwt
- Displacement: 12 tons 1cwt
- Length: 41 ft (12 m) overall
- Beam: 11 ft (3.4 m)
- Installed power: dipping lug sail
- Propulsion: 16 oars, double banked
- Crew: 19
- Notes: On 14 August 1999 The National Historic Ships Committee added the J C Madge to the National Register of Historic Vessels (Certificate no 1763)

RNLB J C Madge (ON 536) was a Liverpool-class, Pulling and Sailing non-self righting lifeboat stationed at Sheringham in the English county of Norfolk from December 1904 until June 1936 during which time she was launched on service 34 times and saved 58 lives. J C Madge was replaced by Forester's Centenary (ON 786).

== Design and construction ==
J C Madge was built at the Thames Ironworks and Shipbuilding Company in Blackwall in 1903 at the cost of £1,436 16s 6d. She was paid for from a legacy of £2,000 left to the RNLI by a Mr James C Madge, a chemist, of Southampton. The design was a Liverpool class, non-self righting, pulling and sailing lifeboat. J C Madge was 41 feet (12 m) in length, making her the largest and the only one built of the Liverpool type lifeboat built. The boat was built using the Clinker method of constructing hulls.

The boat was fitted with two sliding or drop-keels and two water-ballast tanks. The lifeboat had two masts of which the fore-mast carried a dipping lug sail and the mizzen mast a standing lug sail. The boat had two drop keels and was fitted out with water ballast tanks. She pulled 16 oars which were double banked for heavy weather. Her Launching carriage was built by the Bristol Wagon & Carriage Works Company, which was delivered separately by rail to Sheringham. This carriage was constructed with larger front wheels installed with a series of flat metal plates around circumference of each wheel. Their purpose was to help prevent the boat sinking into areas of soft sand.

Heavy ropes were attached to the carriage, and a team of 30 or more men would haul her into the waves at launch times. She was then rowed out through the surf, but if this was not possible then the lifeboat was pulled out to sea using a haul-off warp (a windlass), by use of a thick rope anchored some 200 metres off shore and fixed at the beach end to a post by the lifeboat house. There was a large manually operated winch situated at the back of the boathouse to assist in recovering the boat after launch.

=== Delivery ===
The J C Madge left the yard of the Thames Ironworks and Shipbuilding Company on 30 November 1904, crewed by the Coxswain William "Click" Bishop and six crewmen. She was sailed around the east coast from the Blackwall yard in fair weather, with overnight stops at Harwich and Great Yarmouth, arriving in Sheringham on 2 December 1904. When she arrived at Sheringham she was housed in a new purpose built lifeboat shed at Old Hythe which was a mile west of Sheringham. The new lifeboat was inaugurated on 13 December 1904 at a ceremony at Old Hythe were J C Madge was christened by the daughter of the president of the local RNLI Branch Mr H R Upcher. JP.

== Service ==
The Lifeboat J C Madge was on station at Old Hythe, Sheringham for 30 years and she was launched a total of 34 times and she is credited with saving 58 lives. The first service was on 6 January to the Barge Gothic and Teutonic, both of London. The crews were removed and landed in Sheringham and later the J C Madge and the fisherman's lifeboat Henry Ramey Upcher towed both barges to Great Yarmouth.

=== SS Uller ===
One notable service was to the steamship SS Uller of Bergen on 24 February 1916. The steamship was bound for La Pallice from Sunderland with a cargo of coal and had foundered on a Dudgeon sands. Amid heavy snow storms and gale-force winds the J C Madge stood by her all night in appalling conditions. In the morning the lifeboat escorted SS Uller to the Humber Estuary fifty-three miles away.

The last service by J C Madge was to the Sheringham fishing boat Little Madge on 2 April 1936. Little Madge had got into difficulties and the lifeboat had taken off her crew of two and taken her in to tow, only for both vessels to be towed to safety by the Cromer Lifeboat RNLB H F Bailey III (ON 777).

== Retirement ==
After her retirement from service at Sheringham, Lifeboat J C Madge was replaced by the Foresters Centenary. The lifeboat remained at Sheringham for over a month before being sold out of service for £80 to W Gillard of Wembley, Middlesex. She was converted into a private pleasure craft with a cabin added. The boat was used around the coast of Norfolk and Lincolnshire for many years. In 1988 J C Madge was displayed at the Sheringham stations annual lifeboat Day. Following her appearance there, £30,000 was raised and she was repurchased for restoration in 1989 by the Sheringham Museum Trust. In the summer of 1989 the J C Madge was sailed from Brancaster around the coast to the Lowestoft international boatbuilding college at Oulton Broad where she was restored to her former lifeboat appearance and use. On 14 August 1999 the National Historic Ships Committee added the J C Madge to the National Register of Historic Vessels (Certificate no 1763). From March 2010 she is on permanent display at the new Sheringham Museum

== Coxswains of the J C Madge ==
Whilst J C Madge was on station at Sheringham there were three Coxswains:

- William 'Click' Bishop, 1904 to 1914
- Obadiah Craske Cooper, 1914 to 1924
- James Edward Dumble, 1924 to 1936

== Service and rescues of J C Madge ==
J C Madge (ON 536)
Date	Casualty	Lives saved
1906
6 January	Barge Gothic of London, gave help	3
7 January	Barge Gothic of London, gave help to save barge	
1909
24/25 November	Barge Lord Morton of London, save barge	3
1911
8 April	Whelk boats, of Sheringham, saved two boats	6
8 April	Whelk boats, of Sheringham (Second Launch of the Day), saved two boats	6
1916
24 February	Steamship Uller, of Bergen, stood by and escorted to safety	
16 March	Steamship Rhenania, of London (Prize vessel CT.5), assisted to save vessel	
6 May	Steamship Theodor, of London (Prize vessel CS.73), assisted to save vessel	7
1918
18 April	Steamship Alice Taylor, of Dundee, saved	18
1919
15 July	Airship NS11 crashed near Blakeney, Unsuccessful search	
1924
9 February	Barge Oceanic, of London, saved barge	3
1925
15 November	Four-mast schooner Ingebord, of Helsingborg, assisted to save vessel	10
1927
12 February	Steamship Helmsmen, of Newcastle, stood by	
1930
5 January	Steamship Lestris, of Bruges, gave help	
1935
31 May	Three-mast schooner Six Sisters, of Hull, gave help	
1936
2 April	Fishing boat Little Madge, of Sheringham, saved boat	2

== The lifeboat displayed at Sheringham Museum ==
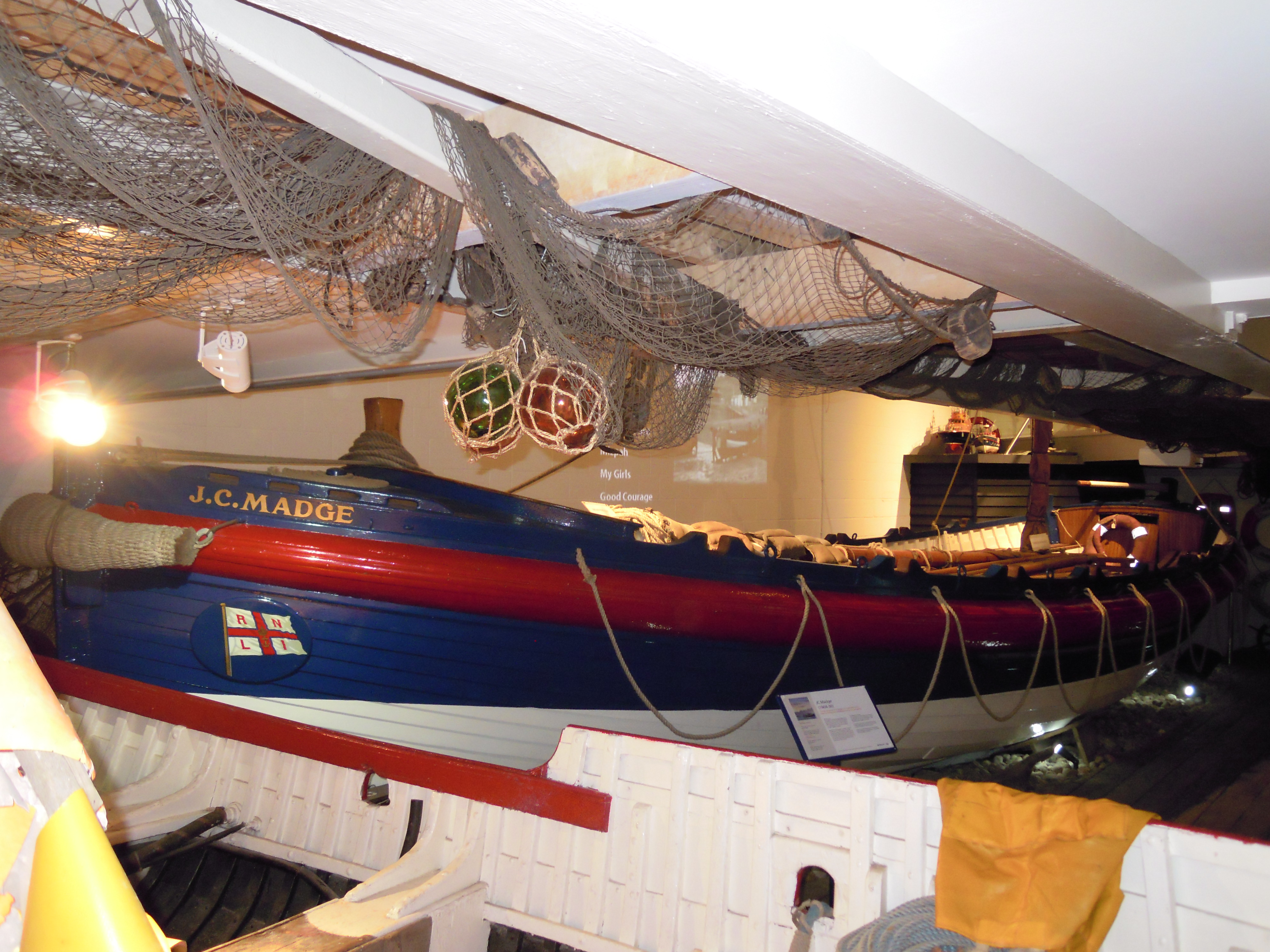

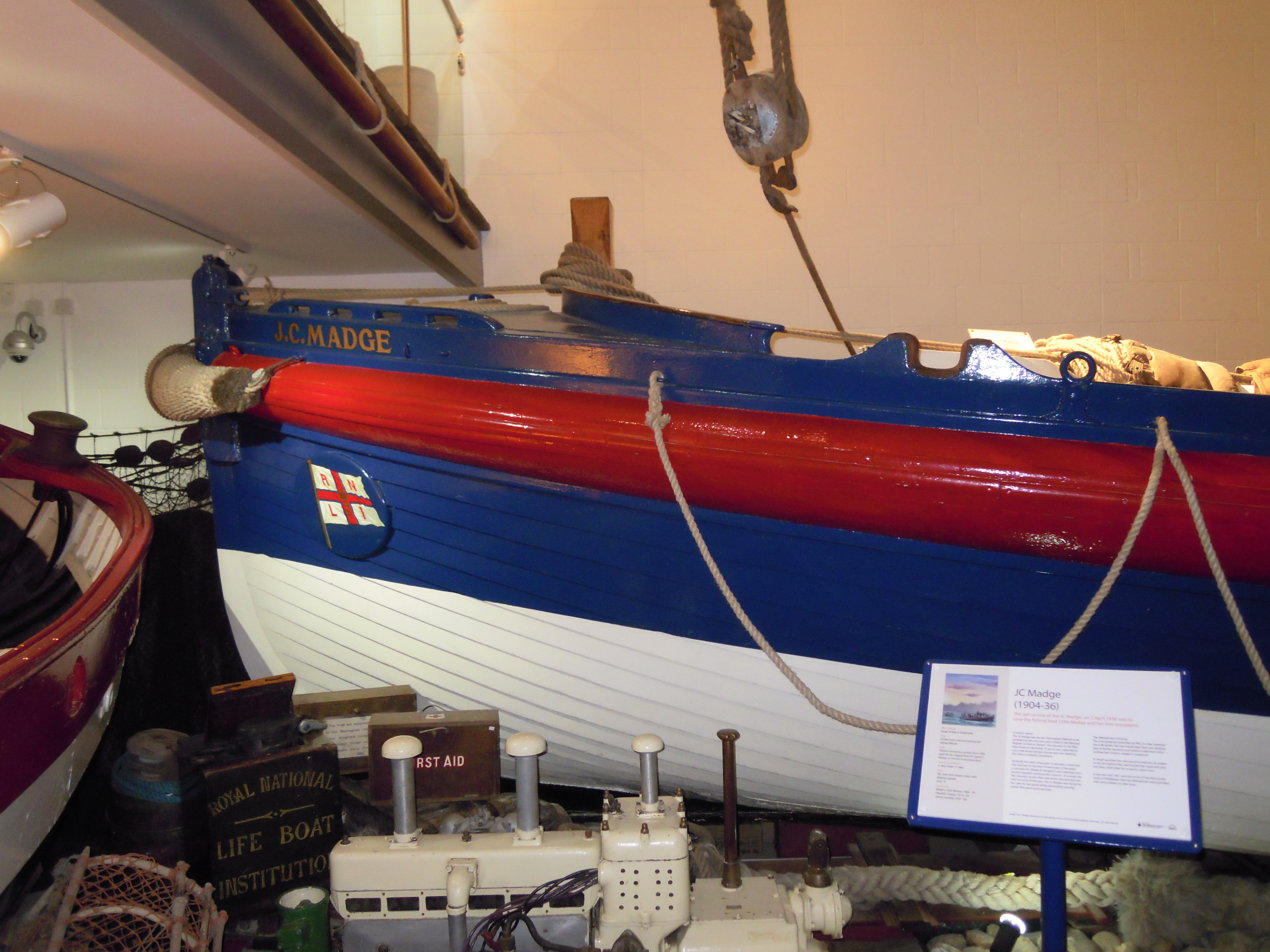
The Bow

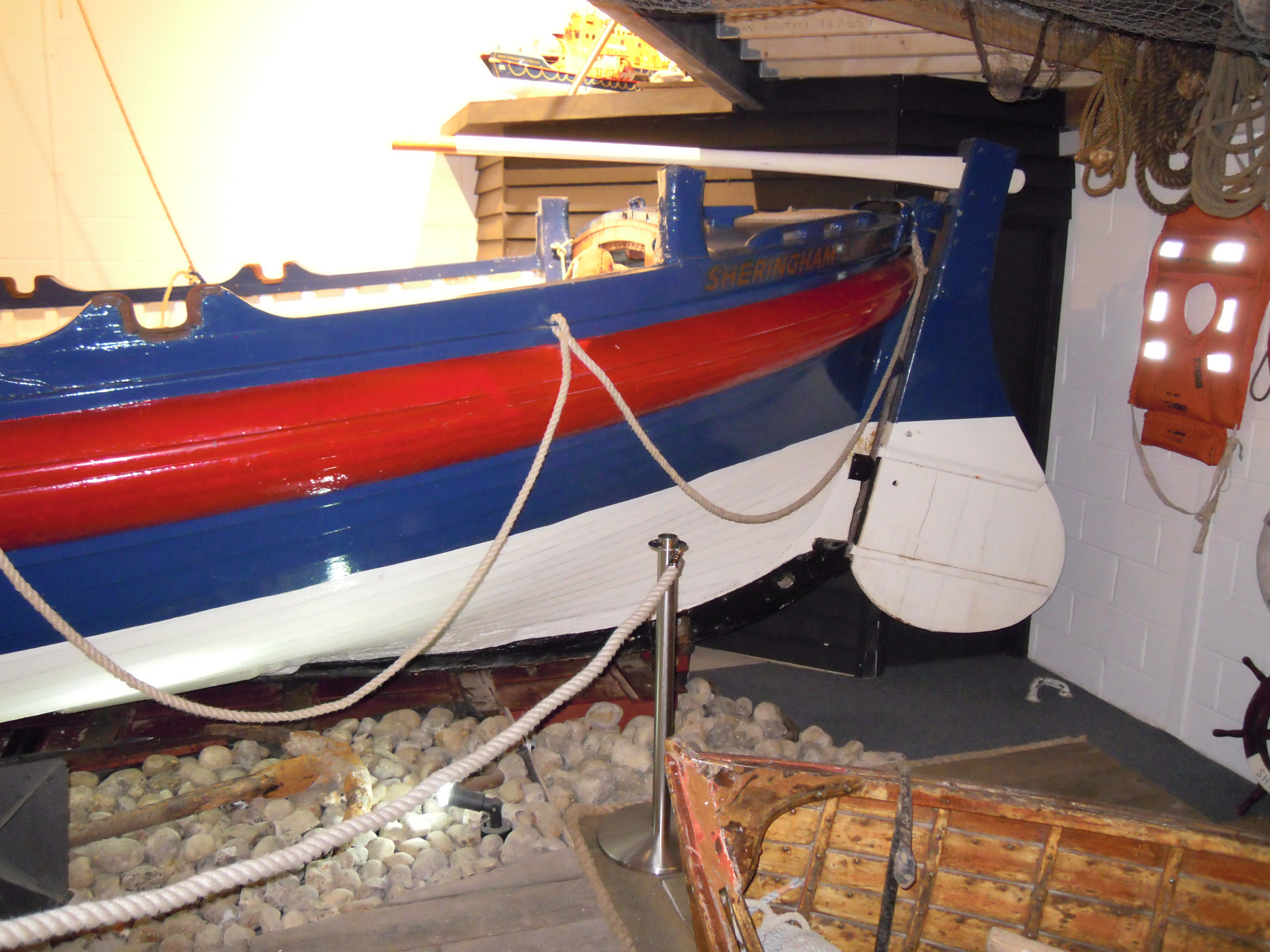
The rudder

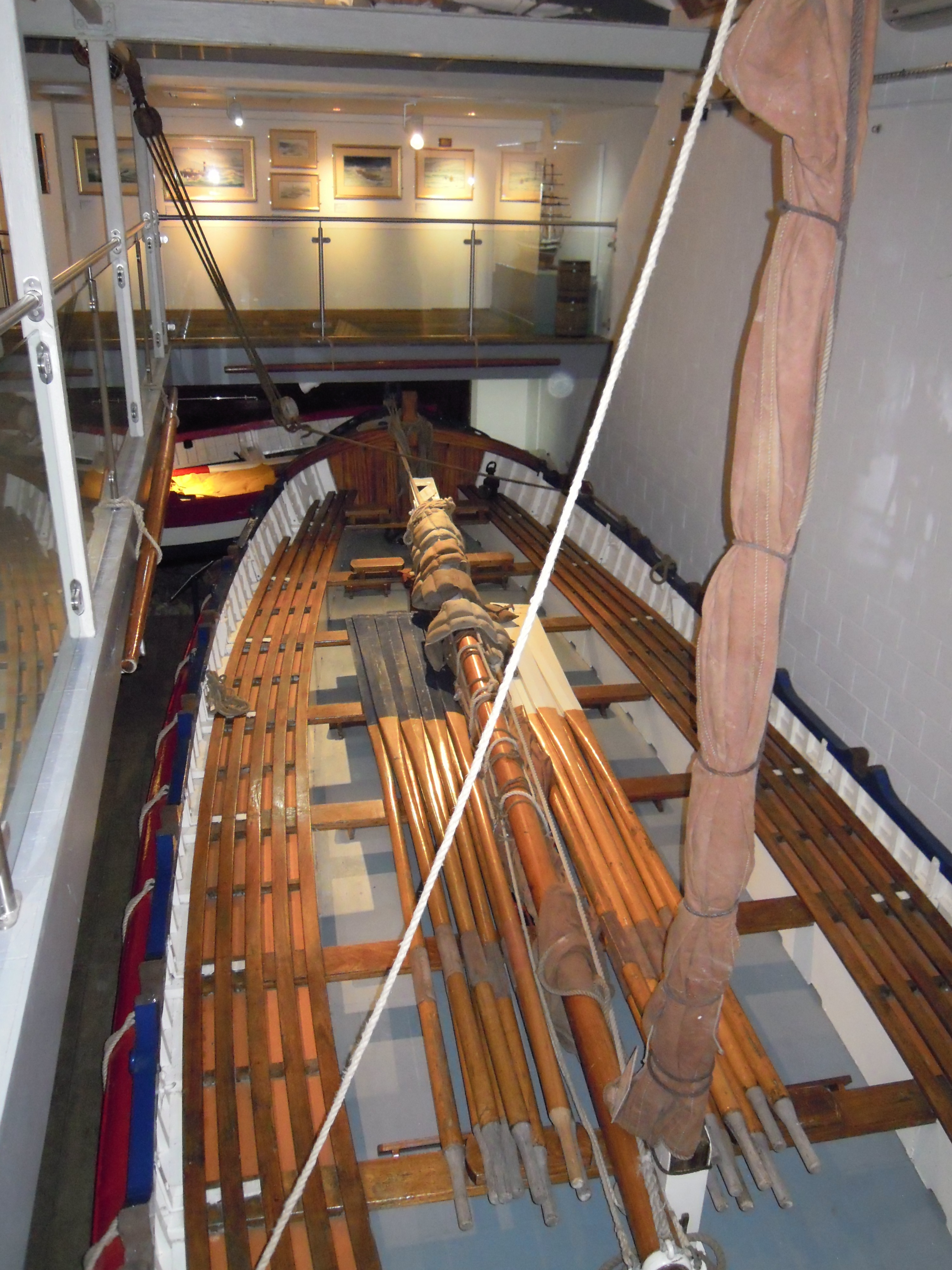
From the viewing gallery

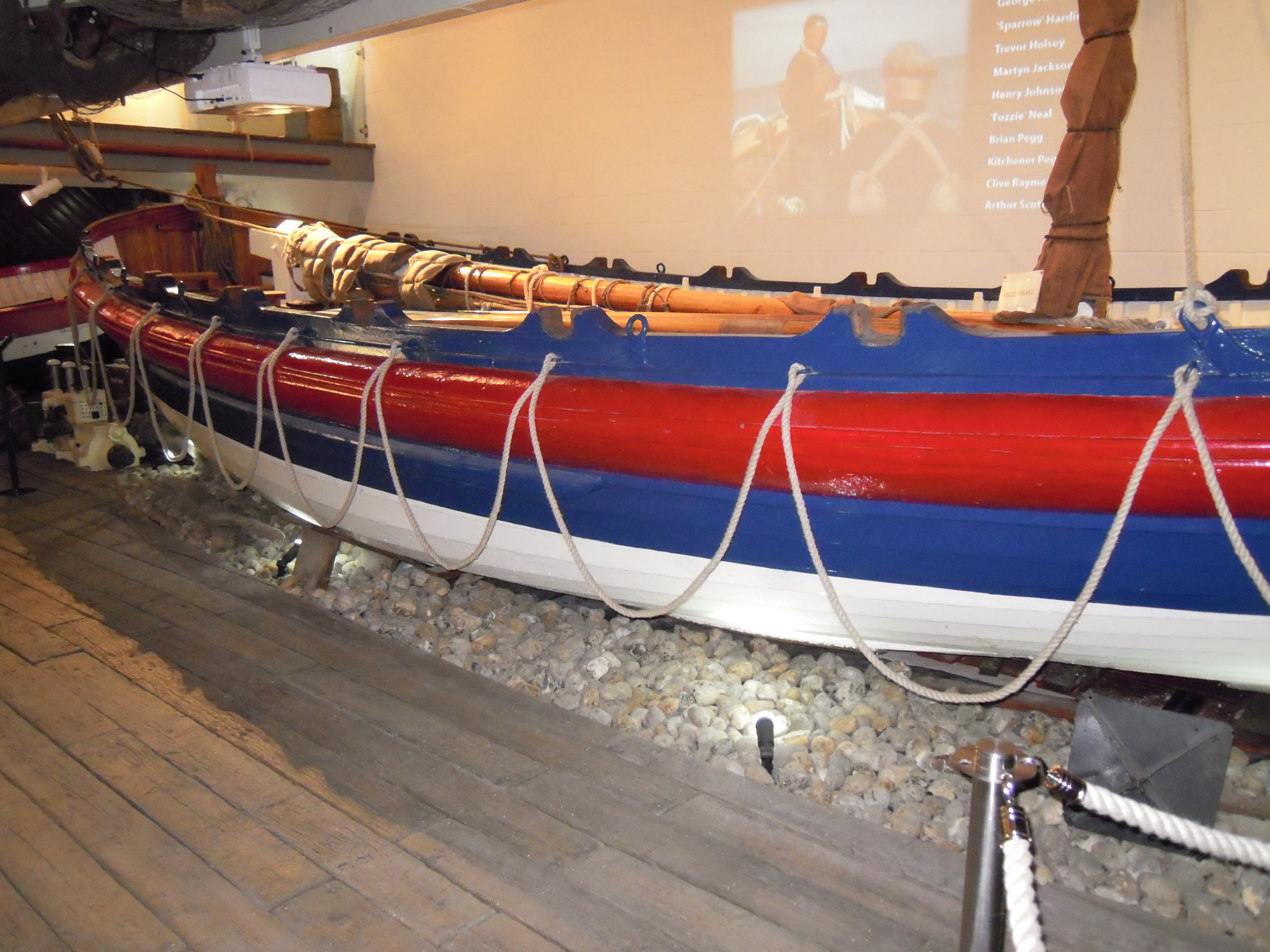
The port side

Preceded by RNLB William Bennett (ON 11)	RNLB J C Madge (ON 536); 1904 to 1936	Succeeded by RNLB Forester's Centenary (ON 786)
