= Henry Ramey Upcher =

Historic lifeboat in Norfolk

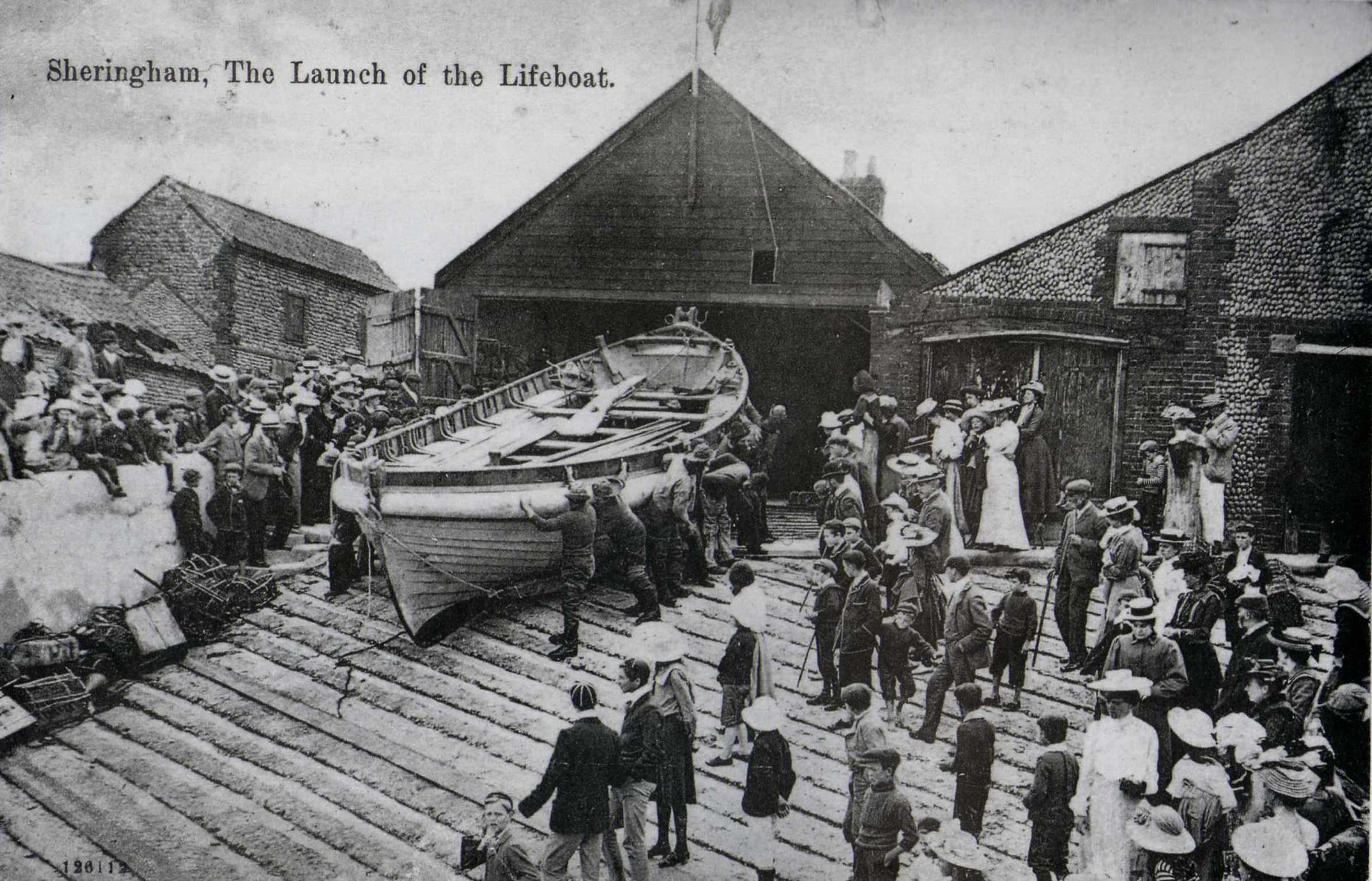
- Henry Ramey Upcher outside her boathouse

History

United Kingdom
- Namesake: Named after Henry Ramey Upcher, Justice of the Peace.
- Owner: Local private organization
- Ordered: November 1883
- Builder: Lewis 'Buffalo' Emery, Sheringham.
- Station: Sheringham
- Cost: £150
- Launched: 4 September 1894
- Sponsored by: Commissioned at the expense of Caroline Upcher, Henry Upcher's widow.
- Christened: By Caroline Upcher
- Fate: Kept on permanent display in its original boathouse in Sheringham

General characteristics
- Length: 34 ft 8 in (10.57 m)
- Beam: 11 ft 3 in (3.43 m)
- Installed power: 16 oars and two Sails
- Propulsion: Fitted with a large dipping lug mainsaIl and a mizzen.
- Notes: On 23 September 2011 The National Historic Ships Committee added the Henry Ramey Upcher to the National Register of Historic Vessels (Certificate no 2481).

Henry Ramey Upcher was the second private lifeboat to be stationed in the English town of Sheringham in the county of Norfolk. She was launched on 4 September 1894 and stayed on station for 41 years until she was slowly retired from duty and by 1935 had ceased rescue work completely. The lifeboat is now on permanent display in her converted original boat shed.

== Two lifeboats ==
Uniquely Sheringham has had in the past two lifeboat services running at the same time, one private and the other operated by the RNLI. The lifeboat Henry Ramey Upcher was the boat of the private service. This lifeboat was the gift of Mrs. Caroline Upcher of Sheringham Hall, donated to the fishermen in memory of Mrs. Caroline Upcher's husband Henry Ramey Upcher.

=== Design and construction ===
Henry Ramey Upcher was built by Lewis 'Buffalo' Emery of Sheringham at a cost of £150. Her keel was laid down on 4 April 1894 after a search had taken several months to find a suitable piece of wood to mould the keel. This was marked with a ceremonial driving of the first nail by Miss Upcher and Mrs Russel Upcher. The boat was built in the style of the local crab fishing boats using local oak for the planking and copper fasteners. The boat was 39 ft 8 in (12.09 m) long and 11 ft 3 in (3.43 m) wide and was double ended. She was powered with 16 oars and she was fitted with a large dipping lug mainsail and a mizzen. She was much lighter than the RNLI's lifeboat William Bennett who was on the Sheringham station during this period. Difficulties with launching the RNLI boat also made her faster to launch. These two factors made her very popular with the fishermen that crewed her. On the downside, her extra width tended to make her more liable to ship water in severe conditions and so was less suitable than the RNLI boats in heavy seas. Her naming ceremony took place on 4 September 1894 by Mrs. Upcher. When launched the crew of the Henry Ramey Upcher commonly consisted of 28 men. This was a coxswain, second coxswain, and 16 oarsmen; a further 8 men tended the sails and two worked the pumps near the stern.

=== Rescues and service ===
The lifeboat christening took place on 4 September 1894 and was performed by Mrs. Caroline Upcher. The lifeboat was blessed by the Rev. Arthur Upcher, who was the youngest brother of Henry Ramey Upcher. The ceremony was watched from the cliffs and gangway by hundreds of local people. After the ceremony, in squally weather, the lifeboat was launched for a short demonstration where she was tried under sail and oar, with Coxswain Barnes Cooper at the helm and a crew of thirty. The Henry Ramey Upcher launched to over 50 services and she worked closely with the lifeboats, William Bennett and J.C. Madge of the RNLI. She remained in service until 1935 and she saved over 200 souls.

==== Fisherman's friend ====
The Henry Ramey Upcher built itself an excellent reputation with the local fishermen up and down the North Norfolk coast. This reputation was built on the work carried out by the private lifeboat whilst helping distressed fishing vessels. The lifeboat men, being fishermen themselves were fully aware of the consequence to a man and his immediate family if a boat was lost at sea. With this in mind the Henry Ramey Upcher, unlike the RNLI boat, would go to great lengths not only to save the fisherman, but also their gear and boat. An example of this took place in 1913 when the lifeboat was launched to rescue the three crew of the fishing boat Lilian of Sea Palling. The Fishermen were saved along with their nets. The lifeboat crew recovered the boat and even managed to take aboard the catch of Mackerel. This they carried up from the sea and sold the catch for him. One of the saved fishermen said that he would always appreciate the men of Sheringham and what they had done for him. Had they had lost their boat and nets it would have meant a loss of at least £50, a large sum of money in 1913.

==== SS Commodore ====
Apart from the service rescues to the local fishing vessels, in 1896 the lifeboat was called out to help four steamships in distress. The most difficult of these was to the steamship Commodore which took place on 7 November 1896. The steamship had been driven onto the shore half a mile to the EAST of Sheringham at Old Hythe. The Commodore had not been alone in her distress in the moderate gale that was blowing. Two other ships had also grounded but had managed to re-float themselves. The Lifeboat launched TO the assistance of the steamer and took off fourteen crew members safely along with three local fishermen who had gone to assist the ship early and got stuck aboard in the prevailing storm. The lifeboat landed the men in Sheringham at two in the morning. The gale proceeded to increase throughout the next day and by the next evening, the Commodore became a total wreck. She remained stuck on the beach for seven years until declared a hazard to shipping she was blown apart.

==== The brig Ispolen ====
On 23 January 1897 the Norwegian brig Ispolen carrying a cargo of ice, was under some distress. The Ispolen had been running through a storm for two days and had shipped a lot of water during that time. She had made for the coast hoping to seek help and headed for a steamer that was anchored offshore close to Cromer. The captain's intention was to contact the steamer to find out if there was a local lifeboat nearby that could help. Unfortunately, the wind and driving rain had blown her close to the shore and the watching local fisherman realised that she would soon be on the beach and raised the alarm. The Sheringham RNLI lifeboat William Bennett could not be launched from her station as her gangway and a section of the sea wall had been washed away in the same northwesterly gale the previous day. Her crew had to drag the William Bennett on her carriage to the East gangway just below Beeston Hill where she could be launched. The Henry Ramey Upcher was also prepared for launch was soon at sea with Coxswain Barnes Cooper at the helm. By now it was 1:45pm and the Ispolen had now run aground just offshore. In rapidly worsening situation the Henry Ramey Upcher had moved alongside the stricken vessel, but the crew who had been completely unprepared, had no ropes ready to tether the boats together. The result of this caused the lifeboat to collide with the Ispolen violently, damaging the lifeboat's cork fender and snapping two of her oars. The lifeboats second approach was more successful when the lifeboat managed to secure the two boats together using grappling hooks thrown into the Ispolen's fore-rigging. Holding the boats and in considerable risk to the lifeboat the crew of eight men were able to be transferred to the relative safety of the lifeboat. Shortly after the rescued men were landed at Sheringham. The news was passed on to the disappointed crewmen of the William Bennett as they were about to launch over at Beeston east gangway.

=== War time service ===
During the period of World War I performed several rescues, helping steamships and the local fishing vessels. Often locally billeted soldiers assisted with her launches. One such rescue took place on 23 January 1915. The coal cargo ship (collier) SS Empress, en route from London to Sunderland had struck an old wreck on Sheringham Shoal and was beginning to sink. The steamer's crew of twenty one had managed to abandon ship and had been taken aboard the nearby steamship Tullochmore. The Henry Ramey Upcher picked the men off the Tullochmore and landed them safely in Sheringham. The following day the lifeboat returned to the wreck with the captain who by now had drifted off the Shoal but nothing could be salvaged and the Empress sank in an area of the sea called the Fairway, where for many years she became a hazard to shipping at low tides.

==== Position of the wreck of the SS Empress today ====
- 52°58.78′N 1°16.38′E at a depth of 15 m (49 ft)

and a height of 2.5 m (8.2 ft)

== Slow retirement ==
In the years following the First World War Henry Ramey Upcher was put into service very few times. The town's RNLI boat began to be used more, and to a greater extent, the new motor lifeboat which had been placed along the coast at Cromer. The Cromer lifeboat had far greater capabilities and endurance than the pulling lifeboats of the Town. During the 1920s and 1930s the lifeboat was used only on very few services. In the era before the start of the Second World War the Henry Ramey Upcher was launched mainly on fund raising events in the town. Her last launch took place 16 August 1945 and ironically resulted in the Henry Ramey Upcher requiring the assistance of the RNLI Lifeboat. Henry Ramey Upcher had gone to sea with sixty passengers to take part in the town's regatta to celebrate Victory over Japan Day. The old Lifeboat was about two miles offshore when she encountered problems. The boat was unable to make headway against a very strong westerly breeze. The Foresters' Centenary was launched and took the Henry Ramey Upcher in tow and beaching her back in Sheringham.

=== Post-war era ===
In the years following World War II Henry Ramey Upcher stayed in her boatshed virtually forgotten except by a few of the local fisherman who looked after her. By the 1960s people, both local and tourist began to show some interest in the lifeboat. A London solicitor called Mr. David Lumsden showed particular interest in the lifeboat and at his instigation the boatshed was repaired and in 1975 it opened was opened to the public with Henry Ramey Upcher becoming the main centre of Interest.

==== The Henry Ramey Upcher Fishermans Heritage Centre ====
In 1977 Sheringham Town council spent £3000 on further repairs and improvements on the shed and lifeboat. The lifeboat and its shed were opened up to the public. Today the Henry Ramey Upcher lifeboat is preserved in its original condition and is housed in her original lifeboat shed at the top of the West slipway in Sheringham.

== Rescue and service ==
Henry Ramey Upcher
Date	Casualty	Lives saved
1894
21 October	Four fishing boats and a hoveller	13
26 October	Six crab boats	12
1895
3 May	Two fishing boats	2
10 December	A number of Fishing boats	16
1896
26 January	Steamship Dewdrop, assisted vessel	
19 February	Steamship Astrid, assisted vessel	
17 October	Steamship Cavendish, assisted vessel	
7 November	Steamship Commodore, saved 3 fisherman and 14 crew	17
1897
23 January	Brig Ispolen	12
3 February	Number of Lighters,	12
1900
26 February	Schooner Swan, assisted vessel	
29 May	Seven whelk boats	17
1901
2 December	whelk boats	2
1906
6 January	Spritsail barge Teutonic	4
1908
1 March	Barque Lodore, stood by	
5 June	Fishing boat	8
1910
28 November	Fishing boat, stood by	
1911
8 April	Eight whelk boats	16
1912
21 January	Steamboat Inca, assisted vessel	
3 December	Six fishing vessels	11
1913
7 May	Fishing boat Lilian of Sea Palling	3
9 May	Fishing boat Dove, saved vessel	2
1914
5 January	Five fishing vessels	11
16 November	Steamship Vera of Newcastle on Tyne, Launched to assist	
1915
23 January	Steamship Empress of Sunderland.	21
12 May	Five fishing vessels	11
1919
26 April	Motor fishing vessel Maple Leaf, stood by.	
26 July	Motor fishing vessel Welcome Home and Premier, stood by.	
1921
30 January	Whelk boats, stood by	
1927
12 February	Steamship Helmsman, of Newcastle, stood by	
1928
8 May	Crab boats	2
1930
27 February	Motor fishing vessels White Heather and Welcome Home	3
1932
27 May	Crab boat Gwendoline	2
1935
11 May	Nine fishing boats of Sheringham, stood by	

Preceded by Augusta	Henry Ramey Upcher; 1894–1935	Succeeded by Station
