= Augusta (lifeboat) =

Lifeboat stationed in Norfolk until 1894

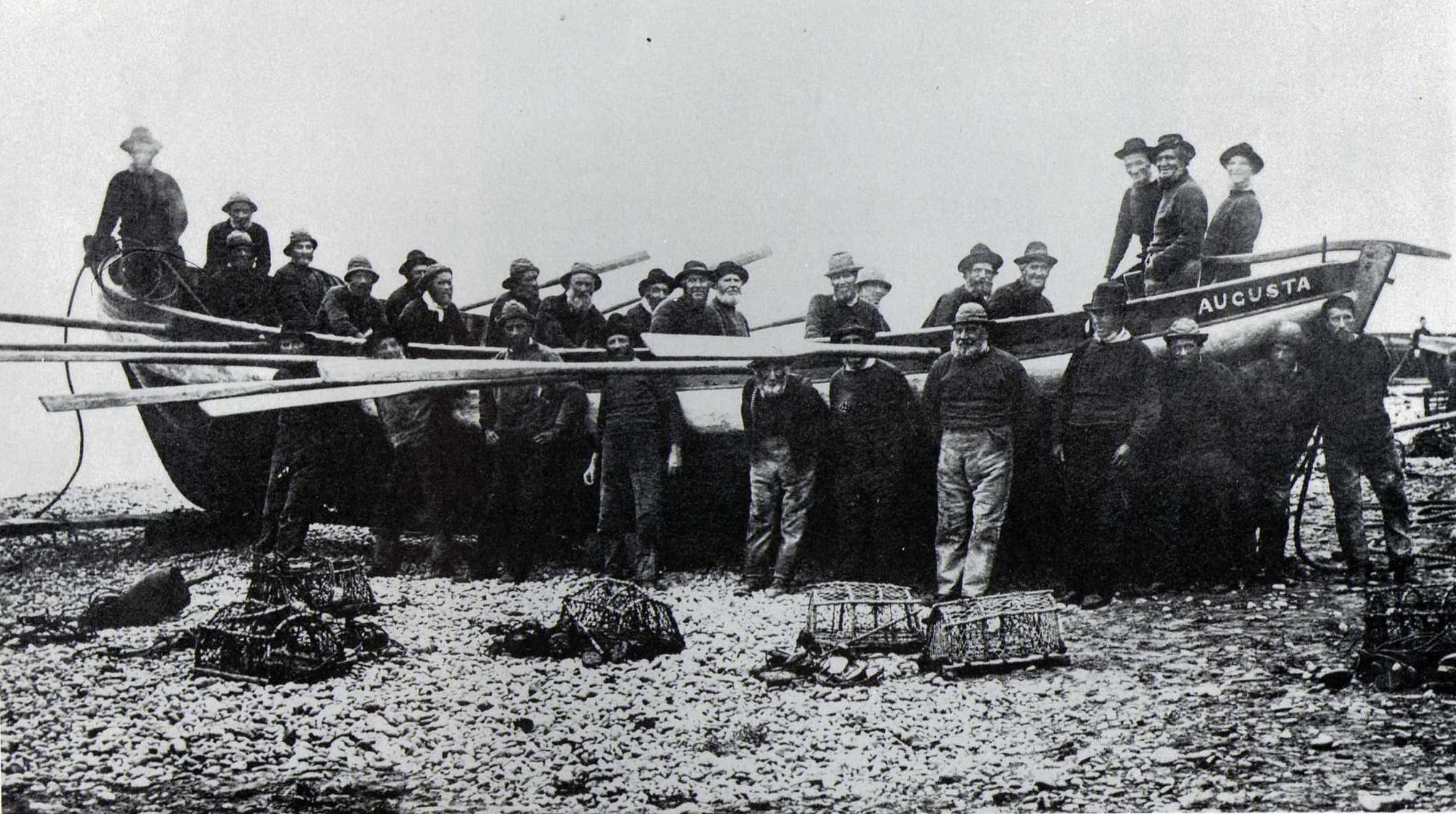
- Augusta with her crew cica 1890s

History
- Builder: Old Newlyn a local shipwright of the Lown boat building family.
- Station: Sheringham
- Cost: £134.12s.2d
- Launched: 14 November 1834
- Sponsored by: Commissioned at the expense of Charlotte Upcher
- Christened: Charlotte Upcher

General characteristics
- Length: 33 ft 5 in (10.19 m)
- Beam: 10 ft 3 in (3.12 m)
- Draught: 4 ft 2 in (1.27 m)
- Installed power: 16 oars and two Sails

The Augusta was a private lifeboat which was stationed in the town of Sheringham in the English county of Norfolk She was launched on 14 November 1838 and stayed on station for 56 years until she was retired from service in 1894 after an inspection declared her to be unseaworthy.

== Beginnings ==
Before The Augusta was commissioned the fishermen of Sheringham would use their fishing boats to rescue vessels in distress, in particular a large fishing boat called Upcher which was owned by a man by the name of Harry West. Mr West had been lent the money for his boat by Charlotte Upcher who, along with her husband had always had shown interest in the lives and welfare of the local fishermen and their families.

Charlotte Upcher had been, for sometime, concerned with the appalling loss of life in the local fishing industry. During one particularly severe gale along the East coast on 29 November 1826, seven Sheringham fishermen lost their lives when their two boats overturned just offshore. Then, in January 1838, a large Sheringham fishing boat known locally as a "twenty footer" was damaged and sunk on Sheringham Shoal. These incidents prompted Charlotte to fund the establishment of a lifeboat service in Sheringham.

== Design and construction ==
The new lifeboat was built by a local builder, Robert Sunman. It was made from timbers grown in the nearby Sheringham Park and the boat was built in the style of the local herring fishing boats. The Augusta was 33 feet 6 inches long and 10 feet 3 inches wide. The power for the boat was provide by 16 oars. She was equipped with a dipping lug mainsail, mizzen sail and had fittings for a rudder at either end to avoid turning her in heavy seas.

== Name and launching ==
The lifeboat was launched on 14 November 1838 with coxswain Robert Long at the helm. She was named The Augusta after the Augusta Elizabeth, the youngest daughter of Abbot and Charlotte Upcher. Augusta had been much loved around the village of Sheringham but unfortunately she had died of consumption at the age of 20 some two years before the lifeboat's launch.

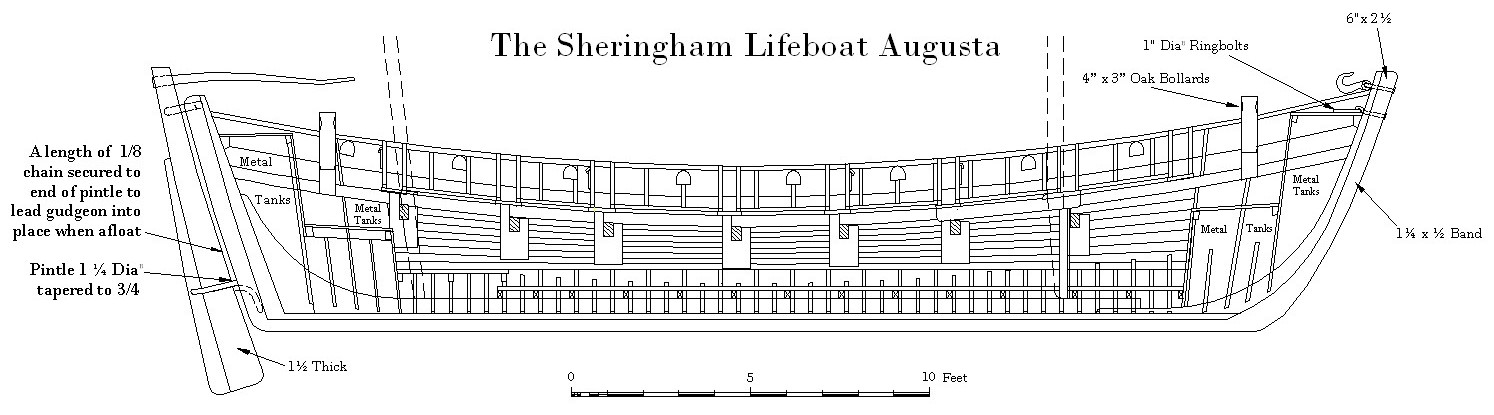

== Service ==
The first records of a launch of The Augusta took place on 7 June 1839 when she was launched to assist the brig Request of South Shields. There was a strong heavy on-shore swell with a strong east by north wind. When the lifeboat came across the distressed brig some of the vessels nine crewmen wanted to abandon ship. The captain was not to desert his ship and asked the lifeboat Augusta to take the Request in to tow. A line was thrown and the brig was towed astern for the rest of the night until it was safe.

=== Dygden ===
The first records of a launch of The Augusta where lives were saved, happened on 5 February 1841. The Dygden was a 600-ton barque from the Baltic port of Åbo (Turku) in Finland. The Dygden, which was carrying a cargo of timber, had been struggling in the stormy seas of the North Sea for fourteen days and had become so completely lost that the barques captain had mistaken St Nicholas Church in Blakeney for Dover Castle and so had thought his ship had reached the English Channel. The Augusta was launched in raging seas with waves crashing over her to go to the assistance of the Dygden which had now got into difficulties of west of Blakeney. When the lifeboat reached the barque the captain and crew were taken aboard, however the Captain wanted to leave a cabin boy aboard the ship to prevent salvage claims being made by others. Eventually the coxswain of the Augusta persuaded the Captain that all 17 members of the crew should be taken off the ship and the Captain and crew were saved and landed at Brancaster. Augusta's services were not recorded at the time although tradition credits her with 200 launches and over 1,000 lives saved, however research so far has established more realistic figures of just over 200 lives saved in 16 launches with 4 further unconfirmed services. During the 56 years of Augusta's service, not one lifeboatman was lost, this may well be attributed to the skill of the Coxswain and crews and their local knowledge of this part of the coast and not least of all because they always wore their lifejackets.

== Recorded service and rescues ==
Date	Casualty	Lives saved
1839
7 June	Request of South Shields, on Sheringham Shoals, rendered assistance	
1841
5 February	The barque Dygden of Abo, Russia, assistance required off Blakeney/Thornham	17
1842
9 September	The Schooner Hamburgh of Dundee, rescued, Old Hythe	8
1845
15 April	The Brig Nautilus of Aberdeen, rescued off the coast of Skelding Hill	8
May	The Brig Alpha of South Shields, rescued, Sheringham Shoals	10
May	The Brig Gallena, rescued off Salthouse	8
1846
13 October	Fishing boats	81
1852
4 April	Crab boats, stood by	
1855
30 May	The Sloop Reformation, rescued off the Old Point	Crew
1864
7 March	The Lugger Chasseur from France, rescued	5
1865
1 January	Amphion, rescued off Sheringham	Crew
1869
10 October	The packet immigrant ship William Frothingham of the United States, rendered assistance	
1879
13 October	The barque Villa Franca, wrecked off Old Hythe	60
1881
6 January	Brig Alert, wrecked off Cley next the Sea	7
1882
6 December	The barque Carolina of Norway, rescued	Crew
1892
20 September	Fishing boat, rescued	Crew
1894
16 August	Fishing boat Margaret Thompson of Sheringham, rendered assistance	
16 August	Barque from Austria-Hungary, lost rudder on Sheringham Shoal, rendered assistance	
16 August 1894	Vessel Balaclava, lost mast off Blakeney, rendered assistance	

== Fate ==
By 1895 the Augusta was declared unseaworthy. In the late 1940s she was being used by the Norfolk Sea Scouts on the Norfolk Broads. By 1953 the now derelict lifeboat was found, cut in half and used as a shelter at the Broads village of Ranworth. In recent years some of the Augusta's original planking has been preserved in a tank in Sheringham by a local businessman.
