= List of ship launches in 1887 =

The list of ship launches in 1887 is a chronological list of ships launched in 1887.

	Ship	Class	Builder	Location	Country	Notes
3 January	Jingyuan	Cruiser	AG Vulcan	Stettin	Germany	For Imperial Chinese Navy.
8 January	Etolia	Cargo ship	Harland & Wolff	Belfast	United Kingdom	For D. & C. MacIver.
8 January	Thompsonian	Steamship	Messrs. J. L. Thompson & Sons	Sunderland	United Kingdom	For private owner.
10 January	Haitan	Steamship	Messrs. Raylton Dixon & Co.	Middlesbrough	United Kingdom	For Douglas Steamship Company, Limited.
11 January	Durance	Transport ship		Rochefort	France	For French Navy.
11 January	George Brown	Tug	Messrs. M'Knight & Co.	Ayr	United Kingdom	For Irvine Harbour Trustees.
11 January	Glenshiel	Steamship	London and Glasgow Engineering and Iron Shipbuilding Company (Limited)	Govan	United Kingdom	For Messrs. M'Gregor, Gow & Co.
11 January	Rescue	Steamship	Messrs. W. H. Potter & Sons	Liverpool	United Kingdom	For Messrs. Turner & Co.
11 January	Ryelands	Schooner	Messrs. Nicholson & Marsh	Glasson Dock	United Kingdom	For private owner.
12 January	Ardbeg	Steamship	Sunderland Shipbbuilding Co.	Sunderland	United Kingdom	For R. Gordon & Co.
12 January	Queen Victoria	Steamship	Messrs. Alexander Stephen & Sons	Linthouse	United Kingdom	For Messrs. Thomas Dunlop & Sons.
13 January	Auckland	Steamship	Messrs. Earle's Shipbuilding and Engineering Company, Limited	Kingston upon Hull	United Kingdom	For Humber Conservancy Board.
13 January	Unnamed	Crane pontoon	Messrs. Lobnitz & Co.	Renfrew	United Kingdom	For Panama Canal Company.
13 January	Cocyte	Achéron-class gunboat	Arsenal de Cherbourg	Cherbourg	France	For French Navy
14 January	Drumcliff	Barque	J. Russell & Co.	Greenock	United Kingdom	For Gillison & Chadwick.
20 January	Torpilleur N° 99	35‑metre type, 1st Series, 1st class torpedo boat	Forges et Chantiers de la Méditerranée	La Seyne	France	For French Navy
21 January	Kotaka	Torpedo boat	Yarrow & Co.	Poplar	United Kingdom	For Imperial Japanese Navy.
22 January	Bellaura	Steamship	Messrs. D. & W. Henderson & Company	Meadowside	United Kingdom	For Messrs Bell Brothers & M'Lelland.
22 January	Jane	Steam lighter	W. S. Cumming	Monkland Canal	United Kingdom	For Robert Bain.
22 January	Pholos	Hopper dredger	Messrs. David J. Dunlop & Co.	Port Glasgow	United Kingdom	For James M'Connochie.
22 January	Era	Tanker	Messrs. Palmer's Shipbuilding Company, Limited	Jarrow	United Kingdom	For private owner.
23 January	Cristóbal Colón	Velasco-class cruiser	Arsenal de La Carraca	San Fernando	Spain	For Spanish Navy.
23 January	Don Antonio de Ulloa	Velasco-class cruiser	Arsenal de la Carraca	San Fernando	Spain	For Spanish Navy.
23 January	Don Juan de Austria	Velasco-class cruiser		Cartagena	Spain	For Spanish Navy.
24 January	Kinyomaru	Steamship	Sunderland Shipbuilding Company, Limited	Sunderland	United Kingdom	For private owner.
24 January	Rondine	Steam yacht	Messrs. Ramage & Ferguson	Leith	United Kingdom	For Prince Sirignano.
24 January	Star of Victoria	Steamship	Messrs. Workman, Clark & Co. (Limited)	Belfast	United Kingdom	First steamship built for Messrs. J. P. Corry & Co.
25 January	Carmarthenshire	Steamship	Messrs. C. S. Swan, and Hunter.	Wallsend-on-Tyne	United Kingdom	For Messrs Jenkins & Co.
25 January	Hondo	Steamship	Messrs. Robert Duncan & Co.	Port Glasgow	United Kingdom	For Honduras and Central American Steamship Company.
25 January	Thames	Steamship	Messrs. A. & J. Inglis	Pointhouse	United Kingdom	For Carron Company.
25 January	Thesis	Steamship	MacIlwaine, Lewis & Co.	Belfast	United Kingdom	For private owner.
26 January	Earnmoor	Steamship	Palmers Shipbuilding and Iron Company	Jarrow	United Kingdom	For Earn-Line Steamship Co. Ltd.
26 January	Torpilleur N° 105	35‑metre type, 2nd Series, 1st class torpedo boat	Forges et Chantiers de la Méditerranée	Le Havre	France	For French Navy
26 January	Plymouth	Steamship	Sunderland Shipbuilding Co. Ltd	Sunderland	United Kingdom	For Plymouth, Channel Islands, & Brittany Steamship Co. Ltd., or Jersey, Guernsey and St. Brieuc Steamship Company.
26 January	The Earl	Tug	Messrs. Edward Finch & Co.	Chepstow	United Kingdom	For Sir William Thomas Lewis.
31 January	El Mounsem	Yacht	Messrs. Ross & Duncan	Govan	United Kingdom	For Egyptian Government.
1 February	Harold	Steamship	Messrs. Workman, Clark & Co. (Limited)	Belfast	United Kingdom	For Messrs. Colvils, Lowden & Co.
1 February	Lakeland	Steamship	Globe Iron Works Company	Cleveland, Ohio	United States	For Tri-State Steamship Company.
5 February	Filipinas	Ironclad	Hong Kong and Whampoa Dock Company	Hong Kong	Hong Kong	For Spanish Navy.
5 February	Pelayo	Battleship	Forges et Chantiers de la Méditerranée	La Seyne	France	For Spanish Navy.
8 February	Doris	Barque	Messrs. Alexander Stephen & Sons	Dundee	United Kingdom	For Messrs. Alexander Stephen & Sons.
8 February	Transpacific	Steamship	William Doxford & Sons	Pallion	United Kingdom	For Canadian Pacific Railway.
8 February	Montauk	Steamship	James Laing	Deptford	United Kingdom	For private owner.
8 February	Vulcan	Steamship	Messrs. Edward Withy & Co.	West Hartlepool	United Kingdom	For Thomas Robinson.
9 February	Gloria	Steamship	Messrs. J. F. Waddington & Co.	Seacombe	United Kingdom	For Messrs. Bickersteth, Baker & Co.
9 February	Worcester	Steamship	Messrs. W. Gray & Co.	West Hartlepool	United Kingdom	For Great Western Steamship Company, Limited.
12 February	J. Y. Short	Steamship	Short Bros.	Sunderland	United Kingdom	For James Westoll Line.
15 February	Eber	Gunboat	Kaiserliche Werft	Kiel	Germany	For Kaiserliche Marine.
17 February	Jubilee	Steam trawler	Messrs. W. B. Thompson & Co. (Limited)	Dundee	United Kingdom	For Great Northern Steam Fishing and Carrying Company. Ran aground on being launched.
18 February	Torpilleur N° 100	35‑metre type, 1st Series, 1st class torpedo boat	Forges et Chantiers de la Méditerranée	La Seyne	France	For French Navy
23 February	Royal Jubilee	Steamship	Joseph L. Thompson & Sons	Sunderland	United Kingdom	For Mercantile Steamship Co. Ltd.
23 February	Verulam	Steamship	S. P. Austin & Son	Sunderland	United Kingdom	Built on speculation, sold in March to J. H. Andresen.
24 February	Lockwith	Steamship	Messrs. Readhead	South Shields	United Kingdom	For Messrs. Groves, Maclean & Co.
24 February	Reina Regente	Reina Regente-class cruiser	J. & G. Thomson	Govan	United Kingdom	For Spanish Navy.
26 January	Torpilleur N° 106	35‑metre type, 2nd Series, 1st class torpedo boat	Forges et Chantiers de la Méditerranée	Le Havre	France	For French Navy
28 February	Daisy	Fishing boat	Messrs. Stephen & Co.	Peterhead	United Kingdom	For James Ritchie.
28 February	Yarmouth	Steamship	Archibald McMillan & Son	Dumbarton	United Kingdom	For Yarmouth Steamship Company.
February	Unnamed	Fishing boat	Messrs. J. Webster & Co.	Fraserburgh	United Kingdom	For George Morrice.
9 March	Bellena	Steamship	Messrs. D. & W. Henderson & Co.	Meadowside	United Kingdom	For Messrs. Bell Brothers & M'Lelland.
9 March	Corsican	Steamship	Messrs. Workman, Clark & Co., Limited	Belfast	United Kingdom	For Messrs. J. & J. Macfarlane & Co.
9 March	Mab Queen	Barque	Messrs. Russell & Co.	Port Glasgow	United Kingdom	For Mr. Fairlie.
9 March	Unnamed	Steamship	Messrs. Edward Withy & Co.	Hartlepool	United Kingdom	For private owner.
10 March	Galatea	Orlando-class cruiser	Robert Napier and Sons	Govan	United Kingdom	For Royal Navy.
10 March	Lake Ontario	Steamship	James Laing	Sunderland	United Kingdom	Canada Shipping Co. Ltd.
10 March	Merganser	Steam trawler	Messrs. Camper & Nicholson	Gosport	United Kingdom	For Hugh Leybourne Popham.
10 March	Pius IX	Steamship	Boolds, Sharer & Co	Sunderland	United Kingdom	For Pinillos, Saenz & Compañia.
10 March	Serpent	Archer-class torpedo cruiser		Devonport Dockyard	United Kingdom	For the Royal Navy
12 March	Kenilworth	Merchantman	Messrs. John Read & Co.	Port Glasgow	United Kingdom	For Messrs. Williamson, Milligan & Co.
12 March	Wave	Steamship	Messrs. W. Gray & Co.	West Hartlepool	United Kingdom	For Messrs. R. Ropner & Co.
12 March	Unnamed	Full-rigged ship	Messrs. Williamson & Sons	Workington	United Kingdom	For private owner.
14 March	Ouragan	Transport ship	Loire Shipyards	Nantes	France	For French Navy.
16 March	Tyr	Gor-class gunboat	Karljohansvern	Horten	Norway	For Royal Norwegian Navy.
17 March	Gelert	Schooner	Messrs. W. Thomas & Sons	Amlwch	United Kingdom	For private owner.
18 March	Torpilleur N° 101	35‑metre type, 1st Series, 1st class torpedo boat	Forges et Chantiers de la Méditerranée	La Seyne	France	For French Navy
23 March	Lancashire Witch	Ferry	J. L. Thompson & Sons	Sunderland	United Kingdom	For New Isle of Man Steam Navigation Company.
23 March	Unnamed	Steam hopper barge	Messrs. Lobnitz & Co.	Renfrew	United Kingdom	For Suez Canal Company.
24 March	Armadale	Merchantman	Messrs. Alexander Stephen & Sons	Linthouse	United Kingdom	For Messrs. J. & A. Roxburgh.
24 March	Clan Buchanan	Merchantman	Messrs. Russell & Co.	Port Glasgow	United Kingdom	For Messrs. James Dunlop & Sons.
24 March	St. Sunniva	Cruise ship	Hall, Russell & Company	Aberdeen	United Kingdom	For North of Scotland, Orkney & Shetland Steam Navigation Company.
25 March	Torpilleur N° 107	35‑metre type, 2nd Series, 1st class torpedo boat	Forges et Chantiers de la Méditerranée	Le Havre	France	For French Navy
25 March	Laiyuan	Protected cruiser	Stettiner Vulcan AG	Stettin	Germany	For the Beiyang Fleet
26 March	Anna	Tug	Messrs. Cochran & Co.	Birkenhead	United Kingdom	For Messrs. Hutton & Co.
26 March	Mourne	Steamship	Messrs. Edward Finch & Co. (Limited)	Chepstow	United Kingdom	For Commissioners of Carlingford Lough.
26 March	Nordenfelt II	Nordenfelt-class submarine		Barrow	United Kingdom	For Thorsten Nordenfelt.
28 March	Cabo Penas	Steamship	Joseph L. Thompson & Sons	Sunderland	United Kingdom	For J. M. de Ybarra Y Cia.
28 March	Scotia	Coaster	Messrs. J. & J. Hay	Kirkintilloch	United Kingdom	For Messrs. J. & J. Hay.
29 March	Queen Victoria	Paddle steamer	Fairfield Shipbuilding and Engineering Company	Govan	United Kingdom	For Isle of Man, Liverpool, and Manchester Steamship Company.
29 March	Unnamed	Steamship	Messrs. C. S. Swan & Hunter	Wallsend	United Kingdom	For Messrs. E. Haslehurst & Co.
31 March	Fatshan	Passenger ferry	Ramage & Ferguson & Company	Leith	United Kingdom	For Hong Kong, Canton & Macao Steamboat Company
31 March	Moulmein	Paddle steamer	Messrs. A. & J. Inglis	Pointhouse	United Kingdom	For British India Steam Navigation Company.
March	Bonito	Steamship	Messrs. Oswald, Mordaunt & Co.	Southampton	United Kingdom	For Linea de Vapour Serra Bilbao.
March	Drôme	Transport ship		Saint-Nazaire	France	For French Navy.
March	J. Henry Edmunds	Schooner	C. & R. Poillon	Brooklyn, New York	United States	For Philadelphia pilots.
March	Toxteth	Full-rigged ship	Messrs. Oswald, Mordaunt & Co.	Southampton	United Kingdom	For Messrs. R. W. Leyland & Co.
6 April	Torpilleur N° 102	35‑metre type, 1st Series, 1st class torpedo boat	Forges et Chantiers de la Méditerranée	La Seyne	France	For French Navy
7 April	Calder	Steamship	William Dobson & Co.	Walker	United Kingdom	For Goole Steam Shipping Company.
7 April	Meteor	Steamship	Messrs. James & George Thompson	Clydebank	United Kingdom	For London and Edinburgh Shipping Company.
7 April	Rochecliff	Steamship	Messrs. Edward Withy & Co.	West Hartlepool	United Kingdom	For George Horsley.
7 April	Samuel Mather	Wooden freighter	Thomas Quayle's & Sons		United States	For R. John W. Moore, et al.
7 April	Zarate	Steamship	Messrs. T. Turnbull & Co.	Whitby	United Kingdom	For Messrs. Brightman & Co.
9 April	Kubanetz	Gunboat		Sevastopol	Russia	For Imperial Russian Navy.
9 April	Victoria	Victoria-class battleship	Armstrong Whitworth Elswick yard	Elswick	United Kingdom	For the Royal Navy
14 April	Kronprinzessin Erzherzogin Stephanie	Ironclad	Stabilimento Tecnico Triestino	Trieste	Austria-Hungary	For Austro-Hungarian Navy.
9 April	Thrace	Steamship	Archibald McMillan & Son	Dumbarton	United Kingdom	For Panhellenic Steamship Co.
9 April	Victoria	Victoria-class battleship	Armstrong, Mitchell & Co.	Elswick	United Kingdom	For Royal Navy.
13 April	Emden	Steamship	Earle's Shipbuilding and Engineering Company Limited	Hull	United Kingdom	For Yorkshire Coal and Steamship Company.
14 April	Prince of Wales	Steamship	Fairfield Shipbuilding and Engineering Company	Govan	United Kingdom	For Isle of Man, Liverpool, and Manchester Steamship Company.
18 April	Bouries	Steam hopper barge	Messrs. Lobnitz & Co.	Renfrew	United Kingdom	For Suez Canal Company.
23 April	Emmie May	Humber Keel	George W. Brown & Sons	Hull	United Kingdom	For P. Simpson.
23 April	Fee Cheu	Cruiser and cable ship	William Doxford & Sons	Sunderland	United Kingdom	For Imperial Chinese Navy / Governor of Formosa.
23 April	Herongate	Steamship	Short Bros.	Sunderland	United Kingdom	For Weatherley, Mead & Hussey.
23 April	Oxford	Steamship	Messrs. W. Gray & Co.	West Hartlepool	United Kingdom	For Great Western Steamship Co.
23 April	Torpilleur N° 108	35‑metre type, 2nd Series, 1st class torpedo boat	Forges et Chantiers de la Méditerranée	Le Havre	France	For French Navy
25 April	Arete	Barque	William Pickersgill & Sons	Southwick	United Kingdom	For T. Benyon & Co., or Messrs Thomas Rayner & Co.
25 April	Crescent	Steamship	Joseph L. Thompson & Sons	Sunderland	United Kingdom	For John H. Barry & Co.
25 April	St. Kilda	Steam yacht	Messrs. John Reid & Co.	Port Glasgow	United Kingdom	For Albert Wood.
26 April	Thistle	Yacht	D. & W. Henderson	Partick	United Kingdom	For James Bell, J. Hillard Bell, William Bell, John Clark, William Clark, Andrew Coates, James Coates, George Coates, and William Coates.
27 April	Achille Adam	Steamship	Samuda Brothers	Poplar	United Kingdom	For South Eastern Railway.
27 April	Bracadale	Merchantman	Messrs. Alexander Stephen & Sons	Linthouse	United Kingdom	For Messrs. J. & A. Roxburgh.
27 April	May Flower	Tug	George W. Brown & Sons	Hull	United Kingdom	For Frederick Palmer.
29 April	Torpilleur N° 103	35‑metre type, 1st Series, 1st class torpedo boat	Forges et Chantiers de la Méditerranée	La Seyne	France	For French Navy
April	Caire	Steam hopper barge	Messrs. Lobnitz & Co.	Renfrew	United Kingdom	For Suez Canal Company.
April	Catherine	Fishing vessel	Albert Dock Shipwright Co. Ltd.	Hull	United Kingdom	For Henry Toozes.
April	Dinorah	Schooner	Messrs. Fyfe & Son	Fairlie	United Kingdom	For J. E. Atkinson.
April	Electra	Steamship	Messrs. Russell & Co.	Port Glasgow	United Kingdom	For Clarence and Richmond Steam Navigation Company.
April	Isabella	Steam lighter	W. S. Cumming	Monkland Canal	United Kingdom	For William Corbett.
April	Lady Victoria	Steam yacht	Ailsa Shipbuilding Company	Troon	United Kingdom	For Master of Blantyre.
April	Queen Victoria	Merchantman	Messrs. Alexander Stephen & Sons	Linthouse	United Kingdom	For Messrs. John Black & Co.
April	Vaillant	Tug	Messrs. Lobnitz & Co.	Renfrew	United Kingdom	For Suez Canal Company.
April	Vignureux	Tug	Messrs. Lobnitz & Co.	Renfrew	United Kingdom	For Suez Canal Company.
April	Will o' the Wisp	Steamship	Messrs. D. & W. Henderson	Partick	United Kingdom	For W. A. Coats.
2 May	Reina Cristina	Alfonso XII-class cruiser		Ferrol	Spain	For Spanish Navy.
2 May	Vigilante	Steamship	Messrs. David Rowan & Son	Port Glasgow	United Kingdom	For Messrs. Wilson, Sons & Co.
3 May	Galileo	Man-of-war		Venice	Italy	For Regia Marina.
6 May	Racoon	Archer-class torpedo cruiser		Devonport Dockyard	United Kingdom	For Royal Navy.
7 May	Lydie	Steamship	Messrs. Edward Withy & Co.	Hartlepool	United Kingdom	For Messrs. Burdick & Cook.
7 May	Neptune	Marceau-class ironclad	Arsenal de Brest	Brest	France	For French Navy.
9 May	Sans Pareil	Victoria-class battleship	Blackwall Yard	Blackwall	United Kingdom	For Royal Navy
9 May	Victoria	Steamship	Messrs. Caird & Co.	Greenock	United Kingdom	For Peninsular and Oriental Steam Navigation Company. Ran aground on being launched. Refloated 11 May.
10 May	Buzzard	Nymphe-class sloop		Sheerness Dockyard	United Kingdom	For Royal Navy.
10 May	Torpilleur N° 109	35‑metre type, 2nd Series, 1st class torpedo boat	Forges et Chantiers de la Méditerranée	Le Havre	France	For French Navy
10 May	L'Almée	Yacht	Chantiers de la Seine	Argenteuil	France	For Henri Menier
18 May	Sir W. T. Lewis	Steamship	Messrs. Elliot & Jeffrey	Cardiff	United Kingdom	For private owner.
19 May	Hirondelle	Steam yacht	Messrs. Hanna, Donald & Wilson	Paisley	United Kingdom	For private owner.
20 May	James Stevenson	Steamship		Zambezi	(Portugal) Portuguese East Africa	For private owner.
21 May	Unnamed	Steamship	Messrs. R. & W. Hawthorn, Leslie & Co.	Hebbern	United Kingdom	For "Russian Steam Navigation and Tranding Company".
21 May	Unnamed	Steamship	Messrs Gourlay Bros.	Dundee	United Kingdom	For Messrs. George Armitstead & Co.
23 May	Albatross	Steamship	Penarth Shipbuilding Company	Penarth	United Kingdom	For private owner.
24 May	Fastnet	Steamship	Messrs. M. Pearse & Co.	Stockton-on-Tees	United Kingdom	For Messrs. Farrar, Groves & Co.
24 May	Marceau	Marceau-class ironclad	Forges et Chantiers de la Méditerranée	La Seyne	France	For French Navy.
24 May	Pukai	Steamship	Messrs. William Denny & Bros.	Dumbarton	United Kingdom	For Union Steamship Company of New Zealand.
25 May	Atalantis	Yawl	Messrs. Ramage & Ferguson	Leith	United Kingdom	For Lawrence Ames.
25 May	Bazalgette	Sludge carrier	Barrow Ship Building Co. Ltd.	Barrow-in-Furness	United Kingdom	For Metropolitan Board of Works.
25 May	Grangense	Steamship	Barrow Ship Building Co. Ltd.	Barrow-in-Furness	United Kingdom	For R. Singlehurst & Co.
30 May	Saetta	Folgore-class cruiser	Regio Cantiere di Castellammare di Stabia	Castellammare di Stabia	Italy	For Regia Marina.
May	Albania	Steamship	Messrs. Archibald M'Millan & Sons	Dumbarton	United Kingdom	For private owner.
May	Barbara	Lighter	W. S. Cumming	Parkhead	United Kingdom	For John Watt.
May	Chaloupe No. 23	Steamboat	Messrs. Lobnitz & Co.	Renfrew	United Kingdom	For Panama Canal Company.
May	Chaloupe No. 4	Steamboat	Messrs. Lobnitz & Co.	Renfrew	United Kingdom	For Panama Canal Company.
May	Choubrah	Steam hopper barge	Messrs. Lobnitz & Co.	Renfrew	United Kingdom	For Suez Canal Company.
May	County of Linlithgow	Merchantman	Messrs. Barclay, Curle & Co	Whiteinch	United Kingdom	For Messrs. R. & J. Craig.
May	Dagniette	Steam hopper barge	Messrs. Lobnitz & Co.	Renfrew	United Kingdom	For Suez Canal Company.
May	Gruben	Steamship	Messrs. John Reid & Co.	Port Glasgow	United Kingdom	For John Neilson.
May	Herald of Mercy	Ketch	Ailsa Shipbuilding Company	Troon	United Kingdom	For Henry Cook.
May	Londonhill	Barque	Messrs. Russell & Co.	Kingston	United Kingdom	For Messrs. J. R. Jackson & Co.
May	Moselle	Steamship	Messrs. A. M'Millan & Son	Dumbarton	United Kingdom	For N. Paquet & Cie.
May	Queen	Steamship	Messrs. T. B. Seathh & Co.	Rutherglen	United Kingdom	For private owner.
May	Sotileza	Steamship	Messrs. D. MacGill & Co.	Irvine	United Kingdom	For private owner.
May	Vigilante	Steamboat	Messrs. Murdoch & Murray	Port Glasgow	United Kingdom	For private owner.
1 June	Sinop	Ekaterina II-class battleship	ROPiT Shipyard	Sevastopol	Russia	For Imperial Russian Navy.
3 June	Danetz	Gunboat		Nicolaieff	Russia	For Imperial Russian Navy.
4 June	Empress	Paddle steamer	Fairfield Shipbuilding and Engineering Companyb (Limited)	Fairfield	United Kingdom	For London, Chatham and Dover Railway.
5 June	Bellenden	Steamship	Messrs. D. & W. Henderson & Co.	Meadowside	United Kingdom	For Messrs. Bell Brothers & M'Lelland.
5 June	Unnamed	Steamship	Blohm & Voss	Hamburg	United Kingdom	For Wörman West Afrika Linie.
7 June	Amphitrite	Yacht	Messrs. Camper & Nicholson	Gosport	United Kingdom	For Major Macgregor.
7 June	Immortalité	Orlando-class cruiser	Chatham Dockyard	Chatham	United Kingdom	For the Royal Navy
7 June	Queen	Tug	Messrs. William Allsup & Sons	Preston	United Kingdom	For Messrs. William Allsup & Sons.
8 June	Argus	Tug	Messrs. Hannah, Donald & Wilson	Paisley	United Kingdom	For private owner.
8 June	Grace Darling	Steam yacht	Messrs. Fleming & Ferguson	Paisley	United Kingdom	For Messrs. John Inglis & Co.
8 June	Gulf of Aden	Steamship	Messrs. Raylton Dixon & Co.	Middlesbrough	United Kingdom	For Greenock Steamship Co. (Limited).
8 June	Swansea	Steamship	William Gray & Company	West Hartlepool	United Kingdom	For Atlantic Transport Line.
9 June	Altmore	Merchantman	Messrs. Robert Duncan & Co.	Port Glasgow	United Kingdom	For Messts. Thom & Cameron.
9 June	Maranhão	Steamship	Messrs. J. & G. Thomson	Clydebank	United Kingdom	For private owner.
10 June	Torpilleur N° 104	35‑metre type, 1st Series, 1st class torpedo boat	Forges et Chantiers de la Méditerranée	Le Havre	France	For French Navy
16 June	Unnamed	Steam yacht	Messrs. Alexander Hall & Co.	Footdee	United Kingdom	For Alexander Rennie and others.
18 June	Atago	Maya-class gunboat	Yokosuka Naval Arsenal	Yokosuka	Japan	For Imperial Japanese Navy.
18 June	Bateau-Citerne No. 2	Water carrier	Messrs. Palmer's Shipbuilding and Iron Company, Limited	Jarrow	United Kingdom	For Panama Canal Company.
18 June	Starling	Steamship	Messrs. Palmer's Shipbuilding and Iron Company, Limited	Jarrow	United Kingdom	For General Steam Navigation Company.
21 June	Alca	Steam yacht	Messrs. Scott & Co.	Greenock	United Kingdom	For Colonel Malcolm.
26 June	Tiger	Torpedo cruiser	Stabilimento Tecnico Triestino	Trieste	Austria-Hungary	For Austro-Hungarian Navy.
30 June	Volunteer	Yacht		Wilmington, Delaware	United States	For Charles Jackson Paine.
4 July	Torpilleur N° 111	35‑metre type, 2nd Series, 1st class torpedo boat	Forges et Chantiers de la Méditerranée	Le Havre	France	For French Navy
5 July	Michigan	Passenger ship	Harland & Wolff	Belfast	United Kingdom	For White Diamond Steamship Co.
6 July	United Kingdom	Messrs. Craig, Taylow & Co.	South Stockton	Bangor	Steamship	For Joseph Hoult.
6 July	Foyle	Steamship	Charles Joseph Bigger	Londonderry	United Kingdom	For W. Johnston & Co.
6 July	Goito	Velasco-class cruiser	Regio Cantiere di Castellammare di Stabia	Castellammare di Stabia	Italy	For Regia Marina.
6 July	Kronprinz Erzherzog Rudolf	Ironclad	Pola Navy Yard	Pola	Austria-Hungary	For Austro-Hungarian Navy.
6 July	Metropolis	Merchantman	Messrs. R. J. Evans & Co.	Liverpool	United Kingdom	For Messrs. William Thomas & Co.
6 July	Picton	Steamship	Messrs. Edward Withy & Co.	Hartlepool	United Kingdom	For Messrs. R. Ropner & Sons.
6 July	Victoria	Steamship	Charles Joseph Bigger	Londonderry	United Kingdom	For Londonderry Bridge Commissioners.
7 July	Hampstead	Steamship	Messrs. W. Gray & Co.	West Hartlepool	United Kingdom	For Messrs. Watts, Ward & Co.
7 July	Ira H. Owen	Steamship	Globe Iron Works Company	Cleveland, Ohio	United States	For Owen Line.
7 July	Wardha	Steamship	Alexander Stephen & Sons	Linthouse	United Kingdom	For British India Steam Navigation Company.
7 July	Buonaventura	Torpedo gunboat	Defence Vessel Construction Company (Limited)	Erith	United Kingdom	For unknown owner.
8 July	Tartar	Steamship	Messrs. Raylton Dixon & Co.	Middlesbrough	United Kingdom	For Messrs. Gellatly, Hankey, Sewell & Co.
9 July	Albion	Steam yacht	Messrs. Camper & Nicholson	Gosport	United Kingdom	For P. Thelluson.
11 July	Elettrico	Steamship	Messrs. Alexander Stephen & Sons	Linthouse	United Kingdom	For Navigazione Generale Italiana.
13 July	Imperator Aleksandr II	Imperator Aleksandr II-class battleship	New Admiralty Yard	Saint Petersburg	Russia	For Imperial Russian Navy.
21 July	Eagle	Sloop	R. Dunston	Thorne	United Kingdom	For Messrs. Wood Bros.
21 July	Reubens	Steamship	Joseph L. Thompson & Sons	Sunderland	United Kingdom	For Bolton & Kenneth.
23 July	Irene	Irene-class cruiser	AG Vulcan	Stettin	Germany	For Kaiserliche Marine.
23 July	Torpilleur N° 110	35‑metre type, 2nd Series, 1st class torpedo boat	Forges et Chantiers de la Méditerranée	Le Havre	France	For French Navy
23 July	Unnamed	Steamship	Messrs. Richardson, Duck & Co.	Stockton-on-Tees	United Kingdom	For private owner.
25 July	Colorado	Steamship	Messrs. Earle's Shipbuilding and Engineering Company	Hull	United Kingdom	For Wilson Line.
26 July	Gizeh	Steam hopper barge	Messrs. Lobnitz & Co.	Renfrew	United Kingdom	For Suez Canal Company.
26 July	Thetis	Steam yacht	Messrs. Murray Bros.	Dumbarton	United Kingdom	For Mr. Donaldson.
28 July	Fifeshire	Steamship	Messrs. C. S. Swan, Hunter & Co.	Wallsend	United Kingdom	For Messrs. Turnbull, Martin & Co.
July	Araucana	Tug	W. C. Cummings	Glasgow	United Kingdom	For private owner.
July	Elbe	Merchantman	Russell & Co.	Glasgow	United Kingdom	For Nourse Line.
July	Engineer	Steamship	Messrs. Raylton Dixon & Co.	Middlesbrough	United Kingdom	For Messrs. Fatham, Bromham & Co.
July	Evelyn	Pilot cutter	Messrs. Mordey, Carney & Co.	Newport	United Kingdom	For J. Pugsley.
July	Massourah	Steam hopper barge	Messrs. Lobnitz & Co.	Renfrew	United Kingdom	For Suez Canal Company.
2 August	Minnesota	Cargo ship	Harland & Wolff	Belfast	United Kingdom	For Torrey & Field Ltd.
3 August	Olga	Steamship	Cammell Laird	Birkenhead	United Kingdom	For London and North Western Railway.
4 August	Ethelburga	Steamship	Messrs. J. Readhead & Co.	South Shields	United Kingdom	For Messrs. Dillon, Harrowing & Co.
4 August	Sokoto	Full-rigged ship	Messrs. Russell & Co.	Kingston	United Kingdom	For Ship Sokoto Company (Limited).
5 August	Roddam	Steamship	Messrs. Edward Withy & Co.	Hartlepool	United Kingdom	For Messrs. Steel, Young & Co.
5 August	Thistle	Lighter	W. S. Cumming	Glasgow	United Kingdom	For private owner.
6 August	Cordoba	Steamship	Messrs. M. Pearse & Co.	Stockton-on-Tees	United Kingdom	For Compagnie Chargeurs Réunis.
6 August	Eclipse	Steam launch	Messrs. Cronk & Sons	Preston	United Kingdom	For private owner.
6 August	Elingamite	Steamship	C. S. Swan, Hunter & Co.	Newcastle upon Tyne	United Kingdom	For Huddart Parker.
6 August	William Wolf	Steamship	Wolf and Davidson	Milwaukee, Wisconsin	United States	A building, with over one hundred people on the roof, collapsed when it was hit by a wave caused by the launch. Nine people were killed and nine seriously injured.
8 August	Baron Belhaven	Steamship	Messrs. Robert Duncan & Co.	Port Glasgow	United Kingdom	For Hugh Hogarth.
8 August	Duchalburn	Merchantman	Messrs. Barclay, Curle & Co. (Limited)	Whiteinch	United Kingdom	For Messrs. Robert Shankland & Co.
16 August	Schwalbe	Schwalbe-class cruiser	Kaiserliche Werft	Wilhelmshaven	United Kingdom	For Kaiserliche Marine.
18 August	Ariosto	Steamship	Messrs. Russell & Co.	Greenock	United Kingdom	For Messrs. Robert M'Andrew & Co.
18 August	Britannia	Steamship	Caird and Company	Greenock	United Kingdom	For Peninsular and Oriental Steam Navigation Company.
18 August	Warora	Steamship	Alexander Stephen & Sons	Linthouse	United Kingdom	For British India Steam Navigation Company.
20 August	Anglesey	Ferry	Harland & Wolff	Belfast	United Kingdom	For London & North Western Railway.
20 August	Chōkai	Maya-class gunboat	Ishikawajima-Hirano Shipyards	Tokyo	Japan	For Imperial Japanese Navy.
20 August	Gulf of Trinidad	Steamship	Messrs. Raylton Dixon & Co.	Middlesbrough	United Kingdom	For Greenock Steamship Company (Limited).
20 August	Melpomène	Schoolship		Rochefort	France	For French Navy.
20 August	Pioneer	Schooner	Messrs. McIlwaine & Lewis	Belfast	United Kingdom	For James M'Donell.
22 August	Bencroy	Steamship	Messrs. John Jones & Sons	Liverpool	United Kingdom	For Joseph Hoult.
22 August	Carnsew	Iron-screw steamer	Harvey and Co	Hayle	United Kingdom	
22 August	Jelunga	Steamship	Messrs. William Denny & Bros.	Dumbarton	United Kingdom	For private owner.
22 August	King Arthur	Merchantman	Caledon Shipbuilding	Dundee	United Kingdom	For Messrs. Walker & Clo.
22 August	Santanna	Steam yacht	Messrs. Scott & Co.	Greenock	United Kingdom	For Mons. Louis Pratt.
23 August	Esperanca	Steamship	Messrs. Laird Bros.	Birkenhead	United Kingdom	For Amazon Steam Navigation Company, Limited.
27 August	Wacht	Wacht-class aviso	AG Weser	Bremen	Germany	For Kaiserliche Marine.
30 August	Grasshopper	Grasshopper-class torpedo gunboat		Sheerness Dockyard	United Kingdom	For Royal Navy.
3 September	Courier	Steamship	Messrs. Swan & Hunter	Wallsend	United Kingdom	For Messrs. Huddart, Parker & Co.
3 September	Hainaut	Barque / Tanker	Barrow Ship Building Co. Ltd.	Barrow-in-Furness	United Kingdom	For American Petroleum Company.
3 September	Henley	Steamship	Messrs. W. Gray & Co.	West Hartlepool	United Kingdom	For Messrs. Watts, Ward & Co.
3 September	Kuchus	Steam hopper dredger	Messrs. William Simons & Co.	Renfrew	United Kingdom	For Bombay Port Trust.
3 September	Pollux	Tanker	Messrs. Pearce Bros.	Dundee	United Kingdom	For W. S. Crondan.
3 September	No. 169	Torpedo boat	William Doxford & Sons	Sunderland	United Kingdom	For Royal Navy.
3 September	Unnamed	Steamship	Messrs. John Readhead & Co.	South Shields	United Kingdom	For private owner.
5 September	Unnamed	Tug	Abercorn Shipbuilding Company	Paisley	United Kingdom	For private owner.
6 September	Lahn	Steamship	Fairfield Shipbuilding and Engineering Company	Fairfield	United Kingdom	For Norddeutsche Lloyd.
6 September	Matamah	Steam hopper barge	Messrs. Lobnits & Co.	Renfrew	United Kingdom	For private owner.
7 September	Mogul	Steamship	Messrs. Aitken & Mansel	Whiteinch	United Kingdom	For Messrs. Gellatly, Hankey, Sewell & Co.
7 September	Oceana	Merchantman	Messrs. Robert Duncan & Co.	Port Glasgow	United Kingdom	For R. R. Paterson.
8 September	Unité	Steam launch	Messrs. Elliott & Garrod	Beccles	United Kingdom	For private owner.
9 September	Reina Mercedes	Alfonso XII-class cruiser		Cartagena	Spain	For Spanish Navy.
13 September	Caldwell H. Colt	Schooner	Samuel H. Pine	Greenpoint, New York	United States	For New York Pilots.
14 September	Tabasqueno	Merchantman	Messrs. Millar, Spence & Charles	Grangemouth	United Kingdom	For private owner.
15 September	Hawk	Tug	Penarth Shipbuilding and Ship-repairing Company (Limited)	Penarth	United Kingdom	For Messrs. Watking and Company.
15 September	Rosarian	Steamship	Messrs. D. & W. Henderson	Partick	United Kingdom	For Allen Line.
17 September	Eastern Prince	Steamship	Short Bros.	Pallion	United Kingdom	For Prince Steamship Co.
17 September	Oceania	Passenger ship	Harland & Wolff	Belfast	United Kingdom	For Peninsular & Oriental Steam Navigation Company.
19 September	Heathfield	Steamship	Messrs. Edward Withy & Co.	West Hartlepool	United Kingdom	For F. Wood.
20 September	Norfolk	Steamship	Messrs. S. M'Knight & Co.	Ayr	United Kingdom	For Messrs. Clarke & Reeves.
20 September	Trafalgar	Trafalgar-class battleship		Portsmouth Dockyard	United Kingdom	For Royal Navy.
21 September	Alfonso XII	Alfonso XII-class cruiser		Ferrol	Spain	For Spanish Navy.
21 September	Oithona	Steamship	Messrs. Hall, Russell & Co.	Aberdeen	United Kingdom	For Aberdeen Steam Navigation Company.
22 September	Irene	Irene-class cruiser	Stettiner Vulcan AG	Stettin	Germany	For Kaiserliche Marine
22 September	Prinzess Wilhelm	Irene-class cruiser	Germaniawerft	Kiel	Germany	For Kaiserliche Marine.
30 September	Spider	Torpedo gunboat		Plymouth Dockyard	United Kingdom	For Royal Navy.
September	Malikah	Steam yacht	Messrs. Ramage & Ferguson	Leith	United Kingdom	For H. J. Barrett.
September	Prospero	Steamship	Messrs. W. H. Potter & Co.	Liverpool	United Kingdom	For South Wales and Liverpool Steamship Company.
1 October	Peter	Steamship	Messrs. William Dobson & Co.	Walker	United Kingdom	For "Russian Company for Sea, River, and Land Insurance and Conveyance of Goods".
4 October	Flambro	Steamship	Messrs. William Gray & Co.	West Hartlepool	United Kingdom	For C. M. Webster.
5 October	Torpilleur N° 112	35‑metre type, 2nd Series, 1st class torpedo boat	Forges et Chantiers de la Méditerranée	Le Havre	France	For French Navy
8 October	Lough Fisher	Steamship	Messrs. MacIlwain & Lewis	Belfast	United Kingdom	For Messrs. James Fisher & Sons.
8 October	Unnamed	Lighter	John Robinson	Belfast	United Kingdom	For private owner.
12 October	Sophia Wheatley	Smack	Messrs. H. Fellowes & Son	Great Yarmouth	United Kingdom	For Mission to Deep Sea Fishermen.
17 October	Engalia	Steamship	Messrs. Raylton Dixon & Co.	Middlesbrough	United Kingdom	For private owner.
17 October	Sandfly	Torpedo gunboat		Plymouth Dockyard	United Kingdom	For Royal Navy.
18 October	Exeter City	Steamship	Blyth Shipbuilding Co. Ltd	Blyth	United Kingdom	For Charles Hill & Sons.
19 October	Patrician	Schooner	Paul Rodgers	Carrickfergus	United Kingdom	For P. Tiernan.
20 October	Monte Videan	Steamship	Messrs. D. & W. Henderson & Co.	Partick	United Kingdom	For Allan Line.
28 October	Aurora	Orlando-class cruiser	Pembroke Dockyard	Pembroke Dock	United Kingdom	For the Royal Navy
28 October	Karagola	Steamship	A. & J. Inglis	Pointhouse	United Kingdom	For British India Steam Navigation Company.
31 October	Damascus	Steamship	Messrs. Robert Napier & Sons	Govan	United Kingdom	For Messrs. George Thompson & Co.
October	Earl of Uxbridge	Schooner	Mr. Thomas	Neath	United Kingdom	For private owner.
2 November	Amphitrite	Steamship	Messrs. Edward Withy & Co.	Hartlepool	United Kingdom	For Messrs. Rickinson, Son & Co.
2 November	Glanmire	Steamship	Messrs. W. B. Thompson & Co.	Dundee	United Kingdom	For City of Cork Steam Ship Company.
5 November	Lycia	ship	Harland & Wolff	Belfast	United Kingdom	For D. & C. MacIver.
14 November	Cruiser	Steam yacht	Messrs. Hall, Russell & Co.	Aberdeen	United Kingdom	For Dee and Don Fishery Board.
14 November	St. George	Hopper dredger	Messrs. William Simons & Co.	Renfrew	United Kingdom	For private owner.
15 November	Aqua-Æerial	Steamboat	W. S. Cumming	Glasgow	United Kingdom	For private owner.
15 November	Devawongse	Steamship	Fairfield Shipbuilding & Engineering Co.	Govan	United Kingdom	For Scottish Oriental Steamship Company (Limited).
15 November	Dora	Steamship	Messrs. T. Turnbull & Sons	Whitby	United Kingdom	For private owner.
15 November	Fremona	Steamship	Messrs. Gourlay Bros. & Co.	Dundee	United Kingdom	For Messrs. William Thompson & Co.
15 November	Friend	Pilot boat	Dennison J. Lawlor	East Boston, Massachusetts	United States	For James Lawrence Fowler.
15 November	Unnamed	Steamship	Messrs. Wood, Skinner & Co	Newcastle upon Tyne	United Kingdom	For Russian Company for Transport and Insurance.
16 November	Asama	Steamship	Messrs. M. Pearse & Co.	Stockton-on-Tees	United Kingdom	For private owner.
16 November	Cliff	Sailing barge	Messrs. Orvis & Fuller	Ipswich	United Kingdom	For Messrs. Wilkes & Co.
16 November	Mary	Tug	Messrs. Alexander Hall & Co.	Aberdeen	United Kingdom	For Messrs. C. Whittal & Co.
16 November	Mount Park	Steamship	Messrs. Pearce Bros.	Dundee	United Kingdom	For Messrs. J. & J. Denholm.
16 November	Torre del Oro	Steamship	Messrs. Craig Taylor & Co.	Stockton-on-Tees	United Kingdom	For Messrs. Segovia & Cuadra.
16 November	Unnamed	Steamship	Messrs. Palmer & Co	Newcastle upon Tyne	United Kingdom	For private owner.
19 November	Elton	Steamship	Messrs. W. Gray & Co.	West Hartlepool	United Kingdom	For Messrs. R. Ropner & Co.
19 November	Maiden City	Barque	Charles Joseph Bigger	Londonderry	United Kingdom	For William McCredie Dickie.
19 November	Saxon	Steamship	Messrs. Oswald & Mordaunt	Southampton	United Kingdom	For Union Steamship Company.
19 November	Sindia	Barque	Harland & Wolff	Belfast	United Kingdom	For T. & J. Brocklebank.
29 November	Byculla	Sailing barge	Messrs. William Bayley & Sons	Ipswich	United Kingdom	For E. Garnham.
30 November	Torpilleur N° 114	35‑metre type, 2nd Series, 1st class torpedo boat	Forges et Chantiers de la Méditerranée	Le Havre	France	For French Navy
30 November	Industry	Steamship	Strand Slipway Co.	Sunderland	United Kingdom	For W. H. Cockerline & Co.
November	Hudson	Steamship	Detroit Dry Dock Company	Detroit, Michigan	United States	For Western Transit Company.
November	Kuling	Steamship	Messrs. Boyd & Co.	Pootung	China	For Upper Yangtze Steam Navigation Company.
November	Manwyne	Paddle steamer	Messrs. William Denny & Bros.	Dumbarton	United Kingdom	For Irrawaddy Flotilla Comopany.
November	Memphis	Steam hopper barge	Messrs. Lobnitz & Co.	Renfrew	United Kingdom	For Suez Canal Company.
November	Necos	Steam hopper barge	Messrs. Lobnitz & Co.	Renfrew	United Kingdom	For Suez Canal Company.
November	Pago	Paddle steamer	Messrs. William Denny & Bros.	Dumbarton	United Kingdom	For Irrawaddy Flotilla Comopany.
November	Unnamed	Electric Launch	Forges et Chantiers de la Méditerranée	La Seyne	France	For French Navy.
1 December	Caloric	Steamship	Messrs. Alexander Stephen & Sons	Linthouse	United Kingdom	For Ebenezer Kemp.
1 December	Gisalde	Steamship	Messrs. Osbourne, Graham & Co	Hylton	United Kingdom	For private owner.
3 December	Chamroin	Steamship	Messrs. Ramage & Ferguson	Leith	United Kingdom	For Scottish Oriental Steamship Company (Limited).
14 December	Douglas	Paddle steamer	W. Allsup & Sons Ltd.	Preston	United Kingdom	For Mayor, Aldermen & Burgesses of the Borough of Preston.
14 December	Somerhill	Steamship	Messrs. Richardson, Duck & Co.	Stockton-on-Tees	United Kingdom	For private owner.
15 December	Age	Steamship	E. Wiothy & Co. Ltd	Hartlepool	United Kingdom	For W. Howard Smit & Sons Ltd.
17 December	Arcadia	Passenger ship	Harland & Wolff	Belfast	United Kingdom	For Peninsular & Oriental Steam Navigation Company.
17 December	Flower of Avondale	Fishing trawler	Messrs. Bewley, Webb & Co.	Dublin	United Kingdom	For Edward Clarke.
20 December	Torpilleur N° 113	35‑metre type, 2nd Series, 1st class torpedo boat	Forges et Chantiers de la Méditerranée	Le Havre	France	For French Navy
29 December	Elisaeta	Cruiser	Armstrong	Elswick	United Kingdom	For Romanian Navy.
29 December	Iolanthe	Pilot cutter	Francis Phillips	Cardiff	United Kingdom	For John Russell.
31 December	Twickenham	Steamship	Messrs. William Gray & Co	West Hartlepool	United Kingdom	For Messrs. Watts, Ward & Co.
December	Partition	Schooner	Paul Rodgers	Carrickfergus	United Kingdom	For private owner.
December	Terets	Korietz-class gunboat			Russia	For Imperial Russian Navy.
December	Uralets	Korietz-class gunboat		Sevastopol	Russia	For Imperial Russian Navy.
Unknown date	Admiral Kornilov	Protected cruiser		Saint-Nazaire	France	For Imperial Russian Navy.
Unknown date	Auricula	Steamship	John Blumer & Co	Sunderland	United Kingdom	For J. Blumer & Co.
Unknown date	Ayrshire	Steamship	Messrs. Russell & Co.	Port Glasgow	United Kingdom	For Messrs. Thomas Law & Co.
Unknown date	Belle of Dunkerque	Merchantman	Short Bros.	Sunderland	United Kingdom	For Weatherley, Mead & Hussey.
Unknown date	Blue Whyte	Merchantman	Mr. Kinloch	Garmouth	United Kingdom	For private owner.
Unknown date	Bradley	Merchantman	Sunderland Shipbuilding Co. Ltd	Sunderland	United Kingdom	For private owner.
Unknown date	Buenos Aires	Steamship	William Denny and Brothers	Dumbarton	United Kingdom	For private owner.
Unknown date	Cabo Quejo	Steamship	Joseph L. Thompson & Sons	Sunderland	United Kingdom	For J. M. de Ybarra Y Cia.
Unknown date	Cabo San Antonio	Steamship	Joseph L. Thompson & Sons	Sunderland	United Kingdom	For J. M. de Ybarra Y Cia.
Unknown date	Cheniston	Merchantman	James Laing	Sunderland	United Kingdom	For Harris & Dixon.
Unknown date	Cosmos	Survey launch	Mare Island Navy Yard	Vallejo, California	United Kingdom	For United States Coast and Geodetic Survey.
Unknown date	Cragside	Merchantman	Joseph L. Thompson & Sons	Sunderland	United Kingdom	For William Kish.
Unknown date	Dérocheuse	Dredger	Messrs. Lobnitz & Co.	Renfrew	United Kingdom	For Suez Canal Company.
Unknown date	Durban		Laing	Sunderland	United Kingdom	For Union Steamship Company.
Unknown date	Ebe W. Tunnell	Pilot boat	C. & R. Poillon	Brooklyn, New York	United States	For Delaware Pilots.
Unknown date	El Rayo	Warship	William Doxford & Sons	Sunderland	United Kingdom	For Nicaraguan Navy.
Unknown date	Elvaston	Steamship	James Laing	Sunderland	United Kingdom	For Harris & Dixon.
Unknown date	Emma Giles	Paddle steamer	William Woodall	Baltimore, Maryland	United States	For Tolchester Company.
Unknown date	Exe	Steamship	Joseph L. Thompson & Sons	Sunderland	United Kingdom	For Mercantile Steamship Co.
Unknown date	Galatea	Merchantman	Sunderland Shipbuilding Co. Ltd.	Sunderland	United Kingdom	For C. F. Leach.
Unknown date	Galgo	Tug	Messrs. Ross & Duncan	Govan	United Kingdom	For private owner.
Unknown date	Gertrude	Steamship	W. Allsup & Sons Ltd.	Preston	United Kingdom	For private owner.
Unknown date	Giralda	Steamship	Osbourne, Graham & Co	Sunderland	United Kingdom	For Bilton, Williams & Co.
Unknown date	Grand Rivieri	Steamship	Grangemouth Dockyard Company	Grangemouth	United Kingdom	For private owner.
Unknown date	Haverstoe	Merchantman	William Doxford & Sons	Sunderland	United Kingdom	For Bennetts & Co.
Unknown date	Iapagia	Steamship	Sunderland Shipbuilding Co. Ltd	Sunderland	United Kingdom	For Società Anonyme di Navigation a Vapeur Puglia.
Unknown date	J. W. Taylor	Steamship	Short Bros.	Sunderland	United Kingdom	For Taylor Sanderson.
Unknown date	Kaliyuga	Steamship	Simon Langell	St. Clair, Michigan	United States	For St. Clair Steamship Co.
Unknown date	Koonya	Steamship	William Bayes	Hobart	Tasmania	For Moruya Steam Navigation Company.
Unknown date	Kydonia	Steamship	Sunderland Shipbuilding Co. Ltd	Sunderland	United Kingdom	For C. & A. Georgalas.
Unknown date	Kyuyo Maru	Merchantman	Sunderland Shipbuilding Co. Ltd	Sunderland	United Kingdom	For .
Unknown date	Lara	Steamship	Charles Joseph Bigger	Londonderry	United Kingdom	For private owners.
Unknown date	Les Bormettes	Merchantman	James Laing	Sunderland	United Kingdom	For J. A. Hankey.
Unknown date	Louisiana	Steamboat		Marine City, Michigan	United States	For private owner.
Unknown date	Margaret Olwill	Bulk carrier	Henry D. Root	Cleveland, Ohio	United States	For L. P. Smith & J. A. Smith.
Unknown date	Mary Roberts	Merchantman	William Pickersgill & Sons	Sunderland	United Kingdom	For T. Hogan and Son.
Unknown date	Mayflower	Scow	Harry Johnson	Sturgeon Bay, Wisconsin	United States	For private owner.
Unknown date	Midge	Torpedo boat	J. Samuel White	Cowes	United Kingdom	For Queensland Maritime Defence Force.
Unknown date	Miner	Steamship	Evans Anderson & Phelon	Brisbane	Queensland	For Queensland Army.
Unknown date	Montauk	Merchantman	William Pickersgill & Sons	Sunderland	United Kingdom	For T. Hogan and Son.
Unknown date	Moyune	Merchantman	Joseph L. Thompson & Sons	Sunderland	United Kingdom	For China Shippers' Mutual Steam Navigation Co. Ltd.
Unknown date	Murrumbidgee	Merchantman	Joseph L. Thompson & Sons	Sunderland	United Kingdom	For Wilhelm Lund.
Unknown date	Naugatuck	Steamship	Pusey & Jones	Wilmington, Delaware	United States	For private owner.
Unknown date	Olinda	Steamship	John Blumer & Co.	Sunderland	United Kingdom	For Linha de Navegacão de J. H. Andresen.
Unknown date	Olive Branch	Steamship	Bartram, Haswell & Co.	Sunderland	United Kingdom	For Nautilus Steam Shipping Co.
Unknown date	Ooryia	Merchantman	James Laing	Sunderland	United Kingdom	For G. Dickson.
Unknown date	Orono	Steamship	James Laing	Sunderland	United Kingdom	For The Plate Steamship Co. Ltd.
Unknown date	Percy	Mersey flat	John Brundrit	Runcorn	United Kingdom	For John Brundrit.
Unknown date	Puffin	Lightship	Schlesinger, Davis & Co.	Wallsend	United Kingdom	For Commissioners of Irish Lights.
Unknown date	Queen	Tug	W. Allsup & Sons Ltd.	Preston	United Kingdom	For Daniel W. Allsup.
Unknown date	Quiam	Steam barge	John Blumer & Co.	Sunderland	United Kingdom	For River Wear Commissioners.
Unknown date	Roman Prince	Merchantman	Short Bros.	Sunderland	United Kingdom	For James Knott.
Unknown date	Rosebud	Fishing trawler	John Bell	Grimsby	United Kingdom	For Tom C. Gray.
Unknown date	Satellite	Yacht	John F. Mumm	Brooklyn, New York	United States	For private owner.
Unknown date	Shearwater	Schooner	Hawthorne & Co.	Leith	United Kingdom	For H. R. Wolcott.
Unknown date	Sigyn	Barque		Gothenburg	Sweden	For private owner.
Unknown date	Thomsonian	Merchantman	Joseph L. Thompson & Sons	Sunderland	United Kingdom	For R. Harrowing.
Unknown date	Tugboat 13	Tug	John H. Dialogue & Son	Camden, New Jersey	United States	For New York Central Railroad.
Unknown date	Viceroy	Merchantman	William Doxford & Sonss	Sunderland	United Kingdom	For W. Kish.
Unknown date	Ville de Metz	Merchantman	James Laing	Sunderland	United Kingdom	For Compagnie Havraise Peninsulaire de Navegation á Vapeur.
Unknown date	Wirral	Steamship	Charles Joseph Bigger	Londonderry	United Kingdom	For Charles & Edward Singleton.
Unknown date	Yampa	Yacht	Harlan & Hollingsworth	Wilmington, Delaware	United States	For Chester W. Chapin.
