= Rollin Motors =

Defunct American motor vehicle manufacturer

Rollin Motors Company
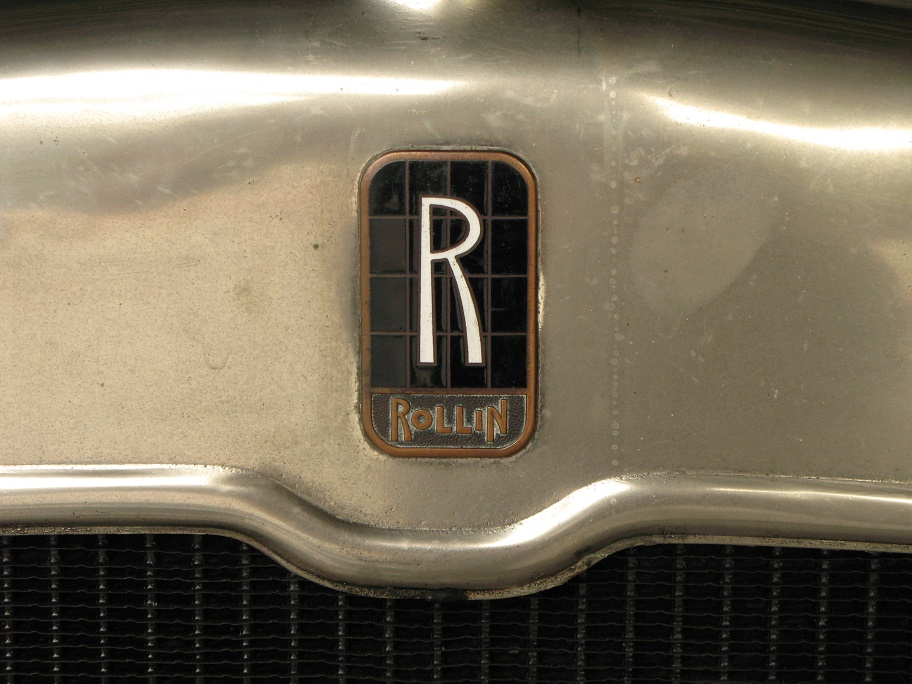
- The Thoroughbred of the Thoroughfare
- Industry: Automotive
- Founded: 1923; 103 years ago
- Founder: Rollin H. White
- Defunct: 1925; 101 years ago
- Fate: Bankruptcy
- Headquarters: Cleveland, Ohio, United States
- Key people: Henry Rollins, James G. Heaslet, E. E. Allyne
- Products: Automobiles
- Production output: 5,750 (1924-1925)

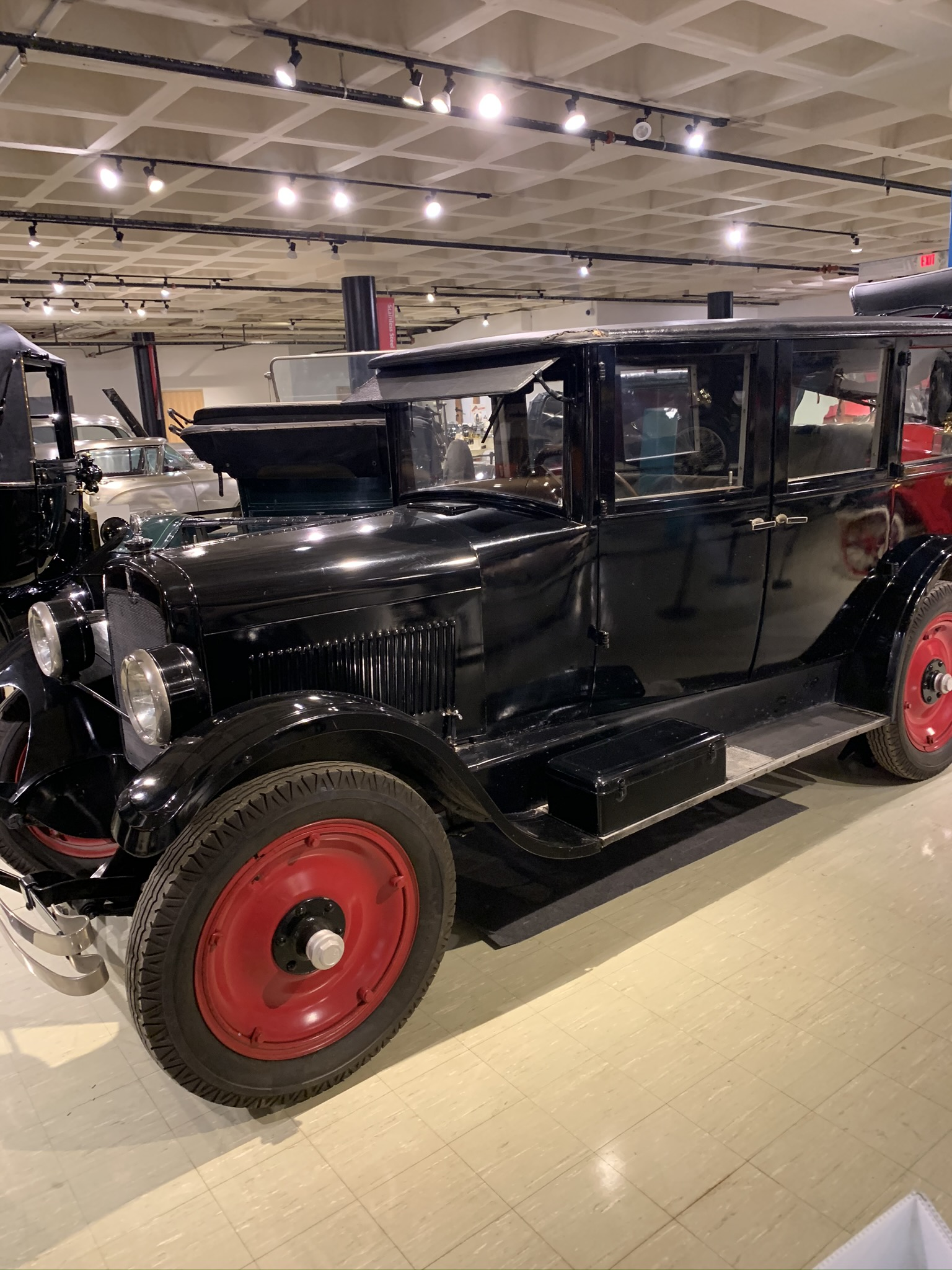
1924 Rollin at Crawford Auto-Aviation Museum

The Rollin Motors Company was an American automobile manufacturer from 1923 until 1925 and founded by Rollin Henry White. The company was based in Cleveland, Ohio.

== History ==
The Rollin automobile had advanced technology, brakes on all four wheels (mechanical internal expanding type), pistons and connecting rods of special aluminum, lubrication oil through a pump and a four-bearing crankshaft. There were four models: Touring ($995, equivalent to $18,692 in 2025), Brougham, Sedan and a three-passenger Coupe($1,175). The Touring was available in two versions, the Regular and the de Luxe. The Regular had wooden spoke wheels while the de Luxe had steel rims. The equipment in the Regular was less lavish compared to the de Luxe. Cars were sold in the US, Australia and a very few in Europe. The cars were designed and built by Rollin H. White, formerly chief engineer of the White Motor Company.

The car was planned as an economical automobile to capture a share of the lower price market. Its engine was similar to that of the Cletrac tractor, a White subsidiary. The engine displacement was 2447 cc with a bore of 82.55 mm and a stroke of 114.3 mm. The wheelbase was 2845 mm. The tire size was 31 x 5.25. The chairman was Rollin Henry White. His father, Thomas White, was chairman of the White Sewing Machine Company, and the White Motor Company. The Rollin was too high-priced for the market for which it had been intended. In its most successful year, 1924, approximately 3,622 units were produced. By the end of 1925 the factory was closed due to bankruptcy.

In December 1924 the car carrier SS Lakeland transported on Lake Michigan several new automobiles. The Lakeland sank with at least twenty-two model-year vehicles aboard from Nash Motors, Kissel Motor Car Company, and a Rollin. Recreational divers recovered the Rollin automobile in 1979 but it was too damaged to save.

As of 2018, there are several Rollin automobiles in the US and in Australia, as well as a few in Europe, at least one in the Netherlands and two in Sweden.

In 2023 the Rollin Preservation Society (NL) presented a documentary about a unique Rollin still registered for use on public roads.

== Gallery ==
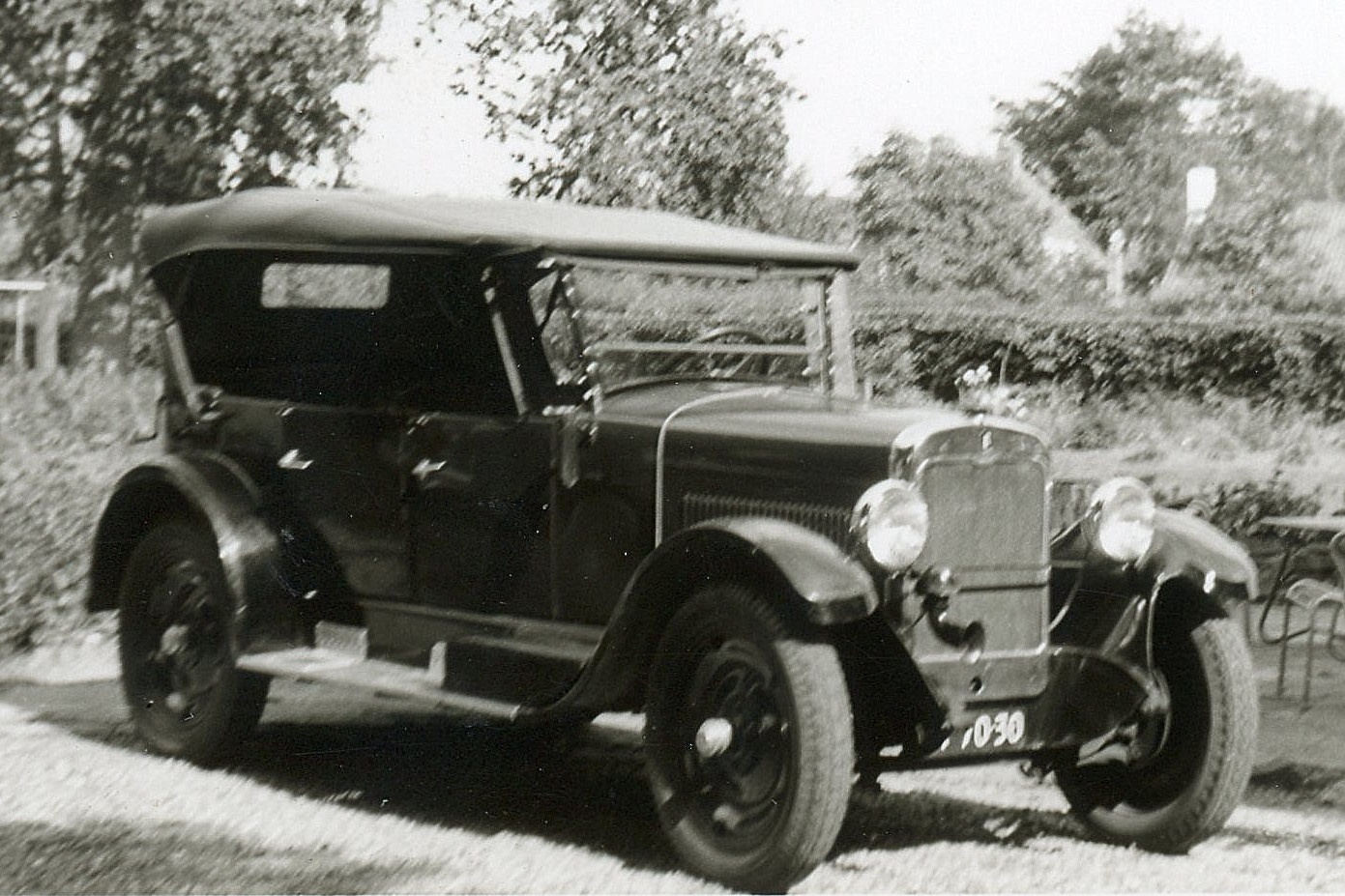
Rollin Touring 1923 - picture from 1963

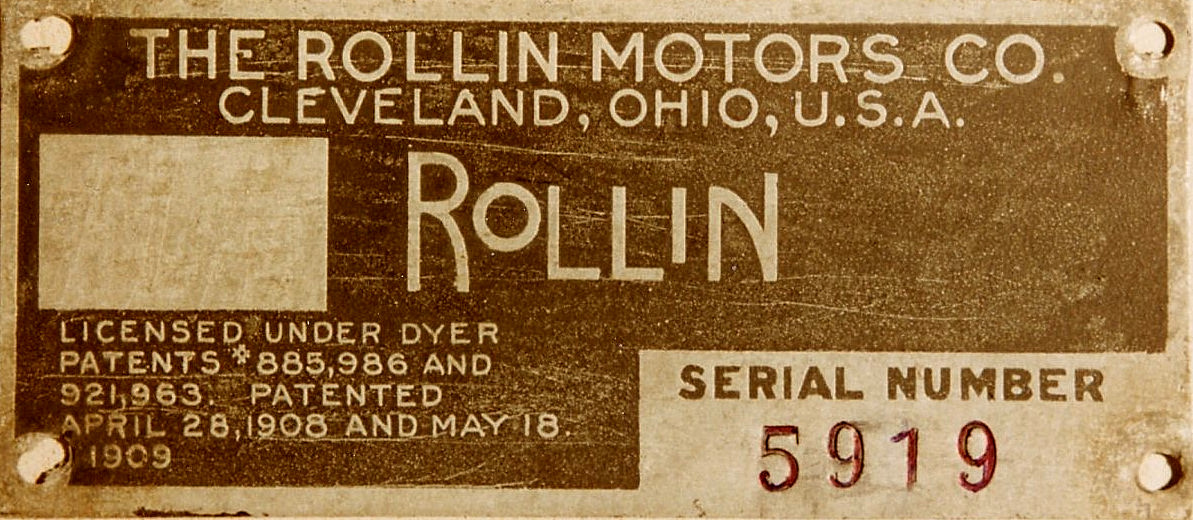
Serial plate of a Rollin

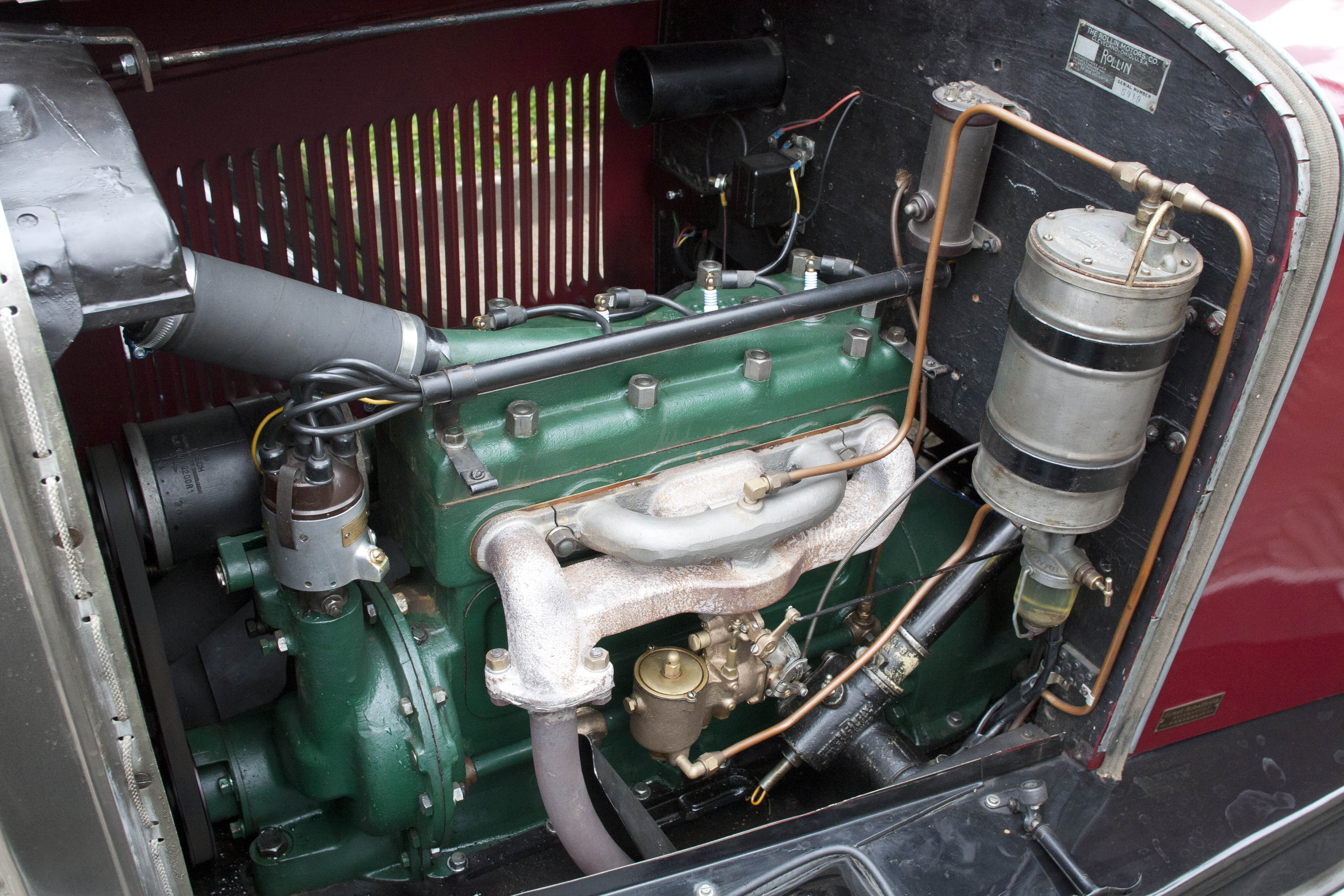
Engine compartment Rollin

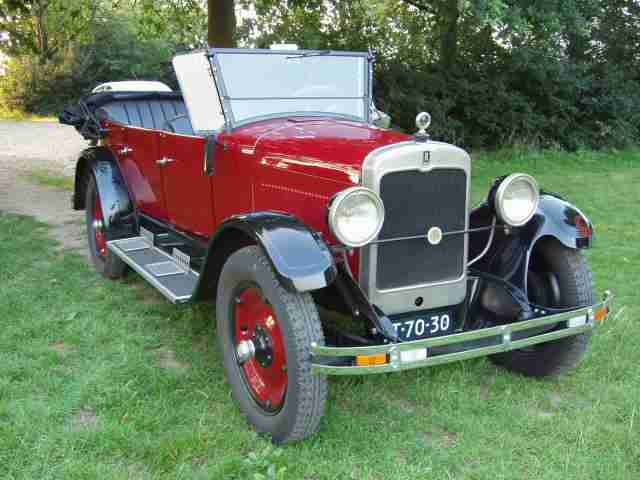
Rollin Touring 1924, picture from 2015

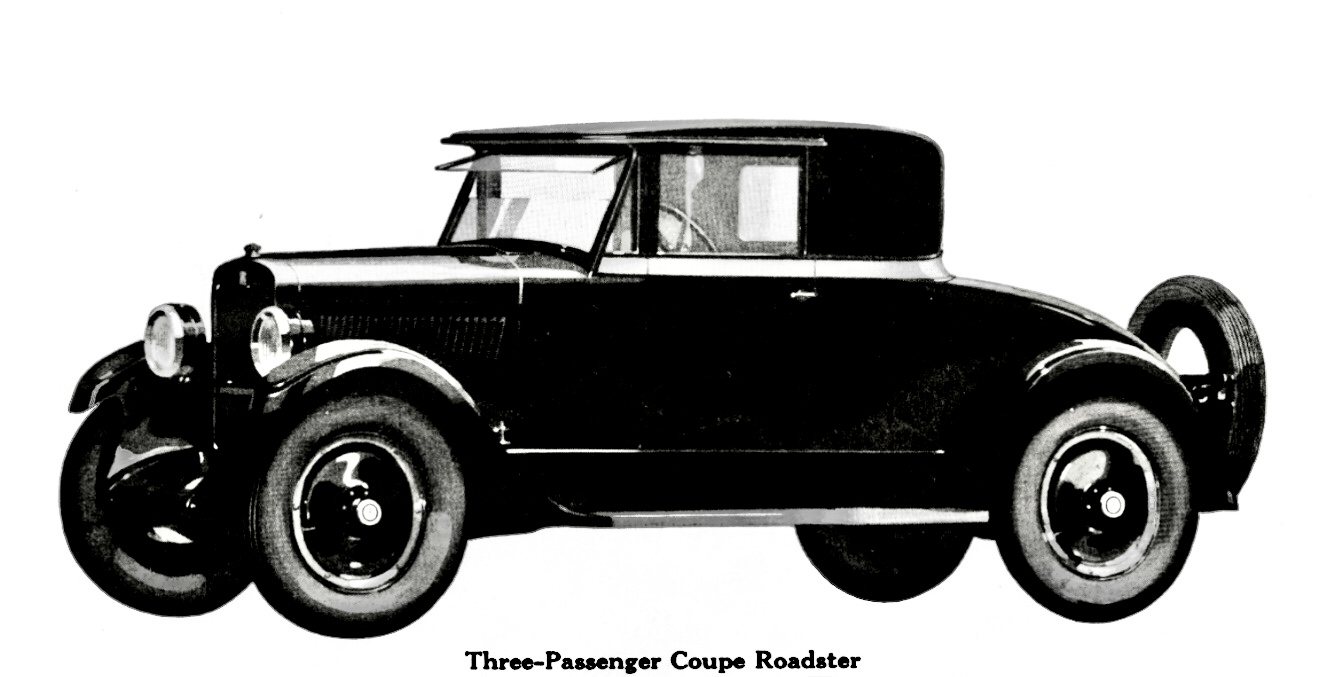
Rollin Three-Passenger Coupe Roadster (1923-1925)

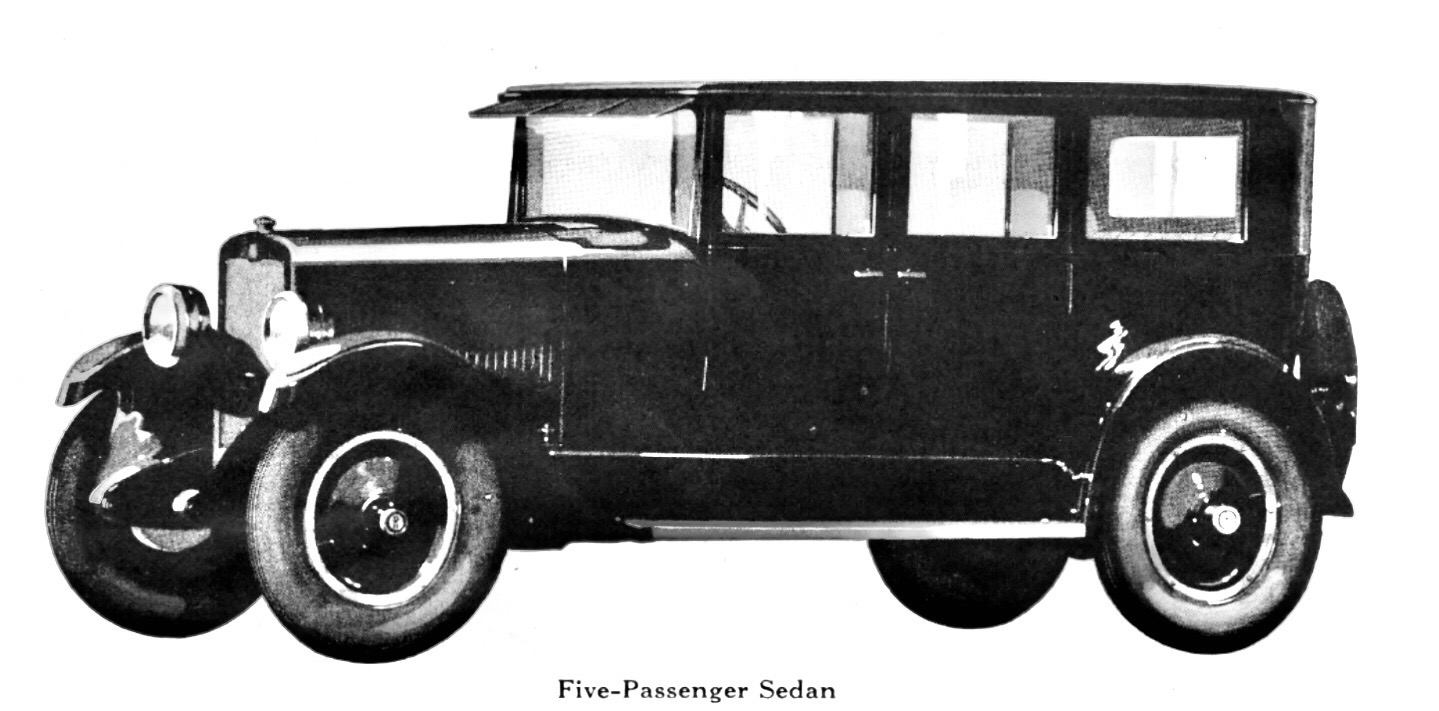
Rollin Five-Passenger Sedan (1923-1924)

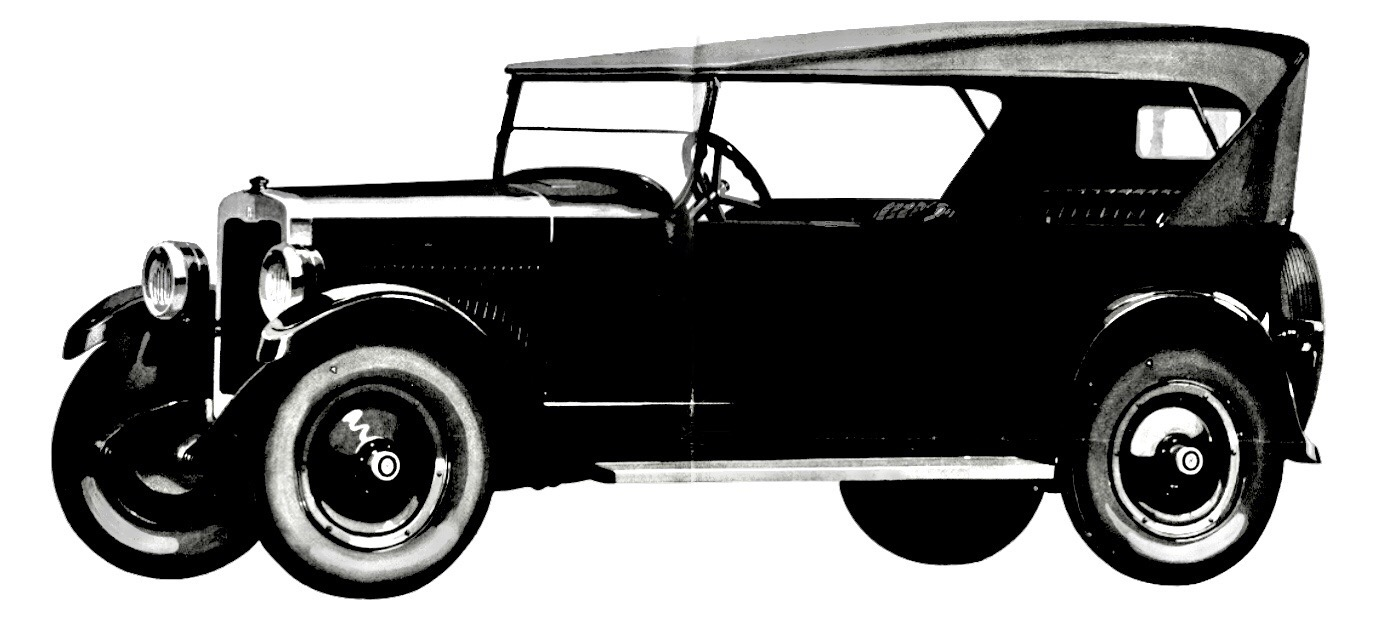
Rollin Touring Car de Luxe (1923-1924)

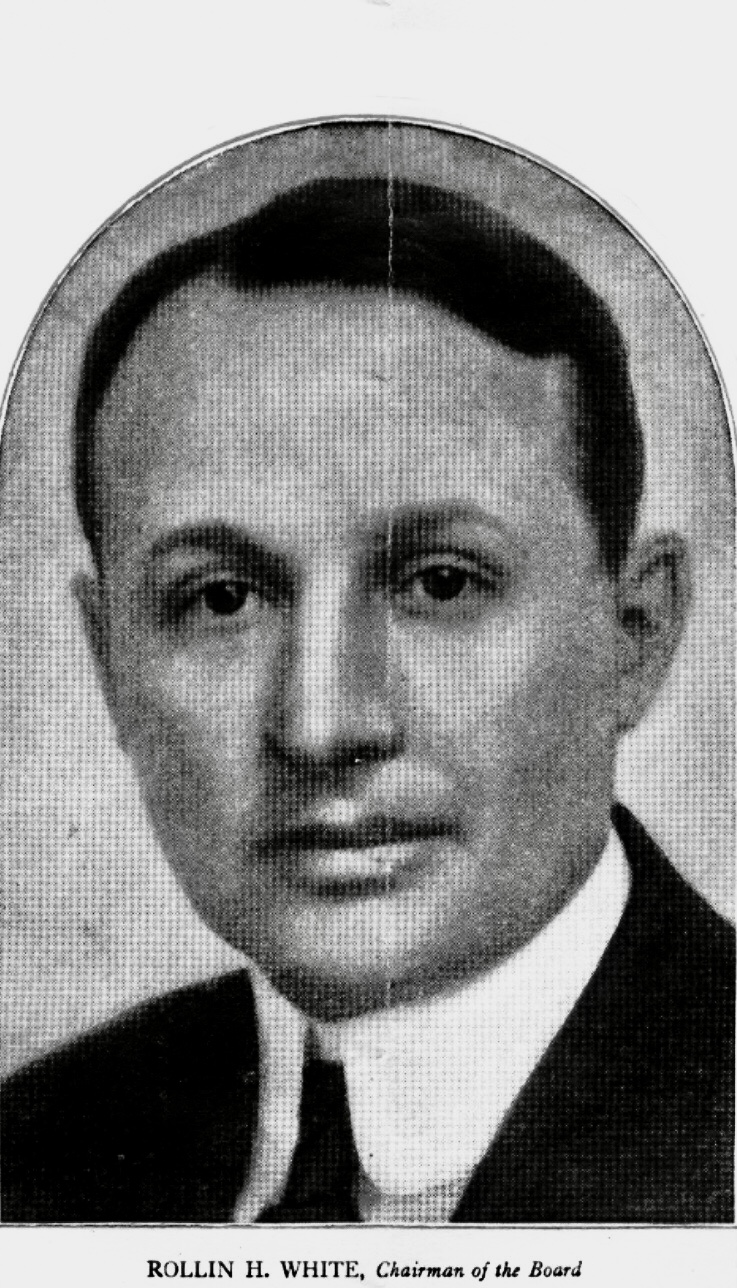
Rollin H. White

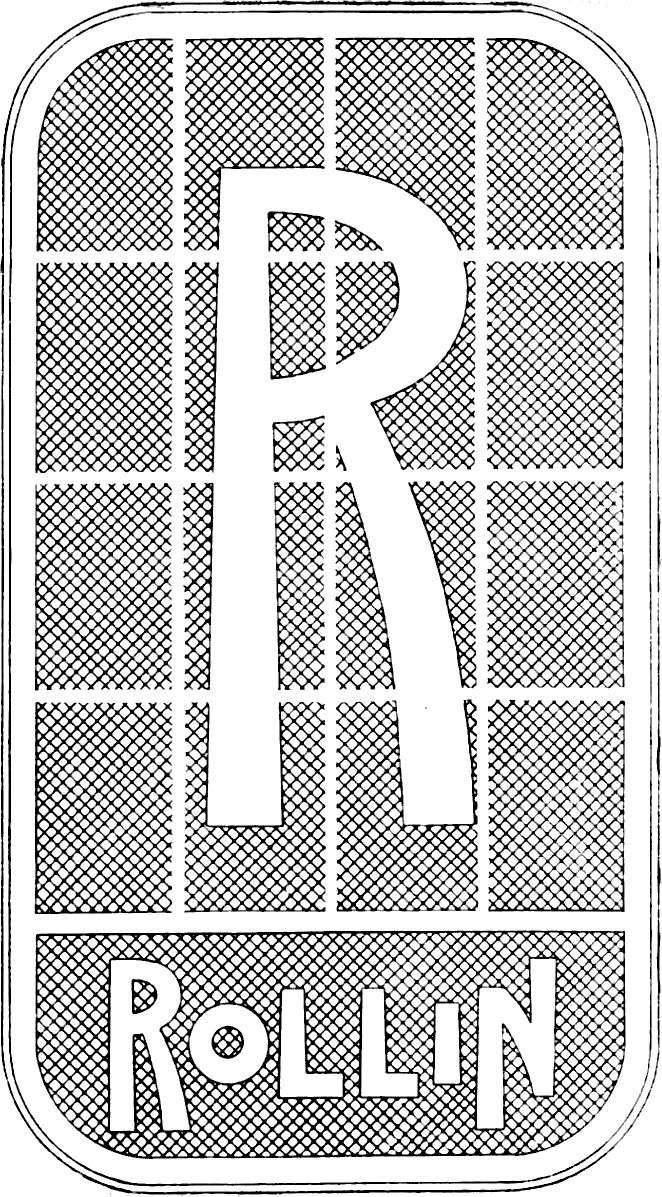
Rollin

== Bibliography ==
- Automobile Trade Journal 1899-1924 (1924-12-01). "Historical Records, back of the men back of the Rollin". Vol. 29, no. 6. p. 573.
- E. Wrenick, Frank; Elaine, E. Wrenick (2016). Automobile Manufacturers of Cleveland and Ohio, 1864–1942. McFarland & Company Inc. p. 141. ISBN 9781476623566.
- Lackley, James H. (2018). The Chandler Automobile. Harvard University Press. p. 235 and 80. ISBN 9781476625546.
