= SS Margaret Olwill =

Steam-powered wooden barge on Lake Erie

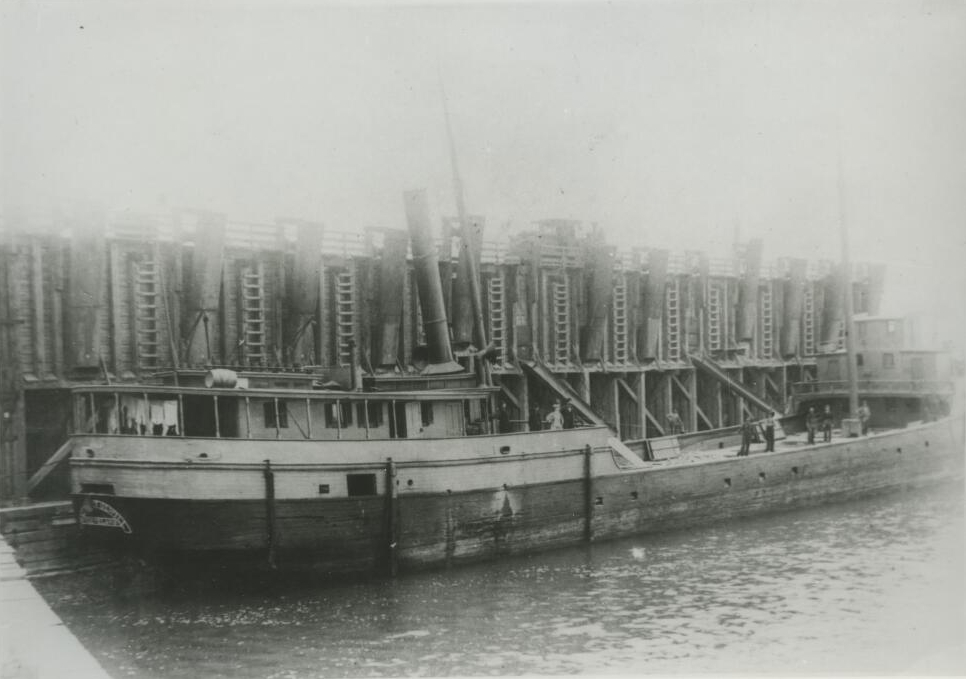
- Margaret Olwill the day before she sank

History
- Owner: L.P. Smith & J.A. Smith
- Route: Kelleys Island, Ohio, to Cleveland, Ohio
- Builder: Henry D. Root
- Completed: 1887
- In service: 1887–1899
- Identification: US 91953
- Fate: Sunk June 28, 1899

General characteristics
- Type: Steam barge
- Tonnage: 554
- Length: 175.6 feet (53.5 m)
- Crew: 9

SS Margaret Olwill was a shipping vessel originally constructed in 1887 to transport goods on Lake Erie. It was rebuilt twice to new specifications. It was wrecked in 1899 in an unexpected June storm with the loss of at least eight lives.

== Vehicle description ==
Margaret Olwill was a steam-powered bulk carrier steam barge built of wood. It was 175.6 feet (53.5 m) in length and had a breadth of 34 feet (10 m). The US registry number was US 91953. It was equipped with a steeple compound engine built by the Cuyahoga Iron Works of Cleveland. It had a gross registered tonnage of 554 tons. The vessel was specifically designed with capabilities to load and unload within a matter of hours. The vessel was built with economy in mind, ignoring artistic sensitivity.

== History ==
Margaret Olwill was constructed in 1887 by Henry D. Root of Cleveland, Ohio for L. P. Smith and J. A. Smith of Cleveland. The ship was named for the maiden name of the first wife of L. P. and J. A.'s father, Pat Smith who was the founder of the family business. It was built in the Smith brothers' yard in the old river bed of the Cuyahoga River. Her captain for the 1888 season was William H. Johnson. In 1890 Margaret Olwill was overhauled to run with a propeller. In 1892 her captain was P. J. Carr. It was re-purposed yet again in 1893 to be a steam barge. John Brown of St. Clair, Michigan, was assigned Margaret Olwill's captain in 1894 at the age of 39. That year the Smiths signed an eight-year contract to haul limestone quarried from Kelleys Island, Ohio to a project extending the west arm of Cleveland harbor's breakwater. The assigned crew largely drew from the circle of John Brown's friends and family. William Doyle, the fireman, was the brother of Brown's wife. George Heffron, the wheelsman, was a cousin of Mrs. Brown. Engineers Luke Cynski and Patrick Murphy were long-time family friends of the Browns.

== Shipwreck ==
Margaret Olwill's last voyage took place June 28, 1899, in which it was carrying limestone weighing 900 tons. (Note: Several sources give a date of June 30. This is in error, and seems to originate from the New York Times piece which was published on June 30, 1899. However, that piece states the report was written on June 29, and the piece places the disaster as "yesterday morning", resulting in a date of June 28. Other sources corroborate this date.) Among the 12 or 13 individuals on board the ship were Captain Brown's wife and young son Blanchard. (Note: Sources give the age as either nine or eleven years old.) (Note: It remains ambiguous as to whether one or two un-named sailors perished.) A close personal friend of Mrs. Brown's, Cora Hitchcock Hunt, had been invited aboard for what had been invariably a routine excursion. Also invited was Captain Brown's parents, but his father declined after viewing the vessel. Missing this particular voyage was chief engineer Murphy, who had just been reassigned to another vessel owned by the Smiths over the protestations of both Brown and Murphy. With the hatch filled to the coaming, the ship could haul 300 tons. For this voyage an additional 600 tons were placed on the deck. Although weather conditions were unfavorable and deteriorating, Captain Brown set course for Cleveland right at midnight. Soon after departure conditions included winds of 50 miles per hour (80 km/h). Seams opened in the ship's hull, and Margaret Olwill took on water, which mixed with the limestone causing a significant list. Brown attempted to pilot the ship to shelter in Lorain, Ohio, but the steering chains failed at about 4:30 am, and the ship became broadside to the waves. With the knowledge that the ship was certain to be wrecked, Brown ordered those aboard into lifeboats. Before his order could be carried out, a rogue wave swept over Margaret Olwill and capsized the ship, which soon sank at approximately 6 am. Before he was tossed overboard, Luke Schinski had the presence of mind to grab a piece of canvas for assistance in rescue.

Four of the crew were rescued by the steamer State of Ohio and the steamer Sacramento, who found the men clinging to the boat's wreckage. Smith, McLea, and Schinski had spotted the State of Ohio after several hours in the water, but the ship did not observe them waving and hollering, which greatly discouraged the men. However, the State of Ohio later found George Heffron and Duncan Coyle alive, clinging to a piece of the deckhouse amongst a large field of wreckage. The storm was still fierce, but ropes were thrown within reaching distance of both men. Coyle was able to tie the rope around his waist, but Heffron was too exhausted to grab onto the rope that was thrown to him, and slipped underwater as the State of Ohio's crew and passengers watched helplessly. The other group of three men renewed their frantic shoutings as they observed this rescue, but they remained yet undetected. Utterly discouraged, their hope was renewed when another ship was spotted by Schinski. This time they made the decision to coordinate their shouts, with the idea the sound would carry further. This was successful, as the Sacramento gave a whistle and turned around to rescue the sailors. The Sacramento was a much larger vessel, and had considerable difficulty maneuvering with sufficient accuracy to rescue the men. Another vessel, the Cascade, noticed the unusual movements of the Sacramento and supposed the Sacramento to be encountering difficulty. Drawing alongside, the Cascade was able to pick up the two men that the Sacramento had been unable to reach.

Eight people died in the accident, including Captain Brown, his wife, and son. The bodies of the deceased washed ashore east of Vermilion, Ohio. Much of the ship's wreckage beached at Cedar Point, Ohio and was sighted by John Brown's brother George Brown, who was captaining the steamer Arrow.

Captain Brown had a reputation for following orders, thus historian Mark Thompson posits that Brown was obeying the ship's owners when he commenced the voyage, with the ship overloaded and weather adverse. A contemporaneous insurance review supposed that Captain Brown, with long experience on Lake Erie, would not believe a small storm would become a major gale in June.

=== List of crew and passengers ===
- John C. Brown (Captain) – perished
- Captain Brown's wife (passenger) – perished
- Blanchard Brown (passenger) – perished
- Duncan Coyle (seaman) – rescued by State of Ohio
- William Doyle (fireman) – perished
- George Heffron (wheelsman) – perished
- Frank Hipp (seaman) – perished
- Cora A. Hitchcock Hunt (passenger) – perished
- Alexander McLea (chief engineer) – rescued by Sacramento
- Luke Schinski (also spelled Cynski) (second engineer) – rescued by Sacramento
- John Smith (seaman) – rescued by Sacramento
- "James" (seaman) – perished
- possibly unknown (seaman) – perished

== Discovery of shipwreck ==
A diver named Rob Ruetschle had spent twenty-nine years searching for the remains of Margaret Olwill, searching an area covering more than sixty square miles (160 km^{2}) Ruetschle believed he had discovered the wreck in 1989, but further investigation revealed the "wreck" to be a rockpile. Ruetschle discovered the wreck July 26, 2017, in conjunction with the Cleveland Underwater Explorers dive team and the National Museum of the Great Lakes. It was identified by the ship's steam engine and the location thereof.
