= SS Warora =

British merchant steamship

History

United Kingdom
- Name: Warora
- Namesake: Warora
- Owner: British India SN Co
- Port of registry: Glasgow
- Builder: A Stephen & Sons, Linthouse
- Yard number: 296
- Launched: 18 August 1887
- Identification: UK official number 95004; code letters KNLG
- Fate: scrapped 1911

General characteristics
- Type: cargo ship
- Tonnage: 3,920 GRT, 2,554 NRT
- Length: 350.0 ft (106.7 m)
- Beam: 47.2 ft (14.4 m)
- Draught: 1 ft 0 in (0.3 m)
- Depth: 20.3 ft (6.2 m)
- Decks: 2
- Installed power: 311 NHP
- Propulsion: 1 × triple-expansion engine; 1 × screw
- Sail plan: 2-masted schooner
- Speed: 11 knots (20 km/h)
- Capacity: 34 × 1st class passengers
- Notes: sister ship: Wardha

SS Warora was a merchant steamship that was built in Scotland in the 1880s and scrapped in India in 1911. She was one of a pair of sister ships that were designed for a Liverpool shipping company to carry cotton, but completed for the British India Steam Navigation Company (BI) to carry sugar. In 1899 she carried troops and cavalry horses for the Second Boer War. She was a troop ship again in the Boxer Rebellion.

She was the first of three BI ships to be named after the city of Warora in the Central Provinces. The second was a steamship that was launched in 1917 and scrapped in 1939. The third was a motor ship that was launched in 1948 and scrapped in 1972.

== Building ==
In 1884 Alexander Stephen and Sons of Linthouse, Glasgow, laid down a pair of cargo ships for Hume, Smith and Company of Liverpool. Their beam was relatively broad in proportion to their length, as they were designed to carry baled cotton from New Orleans to Liverpool. While they were being built, Hume, Smith went into liquidation, leaving yard numbers 295 and 296 incomplete.

The two incomplete hulls lay in Stephen's shipyard until 1887, when BI had them completed. 295 was launched on 7 July as Wardha, followed by 296 on 18 August as Warora.

Warora's registered length was 350.0 ft (106.7 m), her beam was 47.2 ft (14.4 m) and her depth was 20.3 ft (6.2 m). Her tonnages were 3,920 GRT and 2,554 NRT. She had berths for 34 first class passengers.

She had a single screw, driven by a three-cylinder triple-expansion engine that was rated at 311 NHP and gave her a speed of 11 knots (20 km/h). Her steering engine and her winches on deck were steam-powered. She was equipped with electric light throughout. She had two masts, and was rigged as a schooner.

== Career ==
BI registered Warora at Glasgow. Her United Kingdom official number was 95004 and her code letters were KNLG. BI at first used both Wardha and Warora to import sugar from Mauritius to India.

In 1891 Warora made her first voyage to Australia. She left Calcutta on 1 May, with a cargo that included rice, jute, and castor oil. She called at Penang and Singapore, and on 28 May she reached Port Adelaide, carrying 23 passengers bound for Melbourne and Sydney. She reached Melbourne on 5 June, and Sydney on 16 June. Warora then loaded 2,060 tons of coal at Darling Harbour in Sydney, and left on 4 July for Calcutta.

Warora continued to trade between India and Australia. On 28 May 1892, a smallpox patient from the ship was quarantined on Torrens Island, Adelaide. He died soon afterward, and was buried on the island. A year later, on 29 May 1893, 11 of her passengers were quarantined on Torrens Island, also for smallpox.

All BI ships were designed to be converted into troop ships, by putting troop accommodation in the holds. In the Second Boer War the UK Government chartered at least 37 BI ships for war service. On 23 September 1899 in Bombay (now Mumbai) she embarked part of the 19th Royal Hussars. On 9 October she reached Durban. On 7 July 1900 she embarked troops at Calcutta to take to the Taku Forts in China during the Boxer Rebellion.

On 1 August 1904, one of Warora's passengers was reported missing. The ship reached Brisbane that day, and reported that the passenger, an accountant of the Queensland National Bank from Townsville, had not slept in his bunk the previous night, and was nowhere aboard.

Warora was broken up in Bombay in June 1911.

== Bibliography ==
- Haws, Duncan (1987). British India S.N. Co. Merchant Fleets. Vol. 11. Burwash: Travel Creatours Ltd Publications. ISBN 0-946378-07-X.
- Lloyd's Register of British and Foreign Shipping. Vol. I.–Steamers. London: Lloyd's Register of Shipping. 1911 – via Internet Archive.
- Mercantile Navy List. London. 1888 – via Crew List Index Project.
- Universal Register. London: Lloyd's Register of Shipping. 1888 – via Internet Archive.
