= SS Earnmoor =

History

United Kingdom
- Name: SS Earnmoor
- Owner: Earn-Line Steamship Co. Ltd., Philadelphia
- Port of registry: Newcastle
- Builder: Palmers Shipbuilding and Iron Company, Jarrow
- Yard number: 574
- Launched: 26 Jan 1887
- Identification: UK official number: 92856
- Fate: Sank, 5 September 1889

General characteristics
- Type: Cargo ship
- Tonnage: 2,010 GRT
- Length: 280 ft (85 m)
- Beam: 36 ft (11 m)
- Depth of hold: 23 ft (7.0 m)
- Propulsion: T3cyl (22, 35 & 58 x 42ins), 250nhp

SS Earnmoor was a tramp steamer that sank during a storm in 1889. The survivors drifted for 21 days in an open boat and were allegedly forced into cannibalism to survive.

== Ship history ==
Earnmoor was built by Palmers Shipbuilding and Iron Company of Jarrow in 1887, and although owned by the Earn-Line Steamship Company of Philadelphia, was registered in England. At 2,010 gross register tons (GRT), she was 280 feet long and 26 feet in the beam. Engaged in the tramp trade, she did not sail on fixed routes, but rather relied on brokers to find cargoes.

On 10 January 1889 Earnmoor struck a submerged rock in the Delaware River, and was stranded. An official Board of Trade hearing held at the British Consulate in Philadelphia placed the majority of the blame for the incident on the American pilot, but also criticized the master for allowing the pilot to leave the bridge, and for poor records keeping. The helmsman was also fined $22.16 for ignoring a summons and failing to attend the hearing.

=== Sinking ===
Earnmoor sailed from Baltimore on 29 August 1889 under the command of Captain Richard J. Gray. She was bound for Rio de Janeiro carrying 86,000 bushels of wheat and a large quantity of miscellaneous cargo, valued at $70,700.

On 4 September, the ship encountered a severe cyclone and at 12:30 a.m on the next day gave a sudden lurch and sank. One lifeboat floated free and eleven men from the crew of 24 managed to scramble aboard. Lacking food and water the survivors suffered from intense thirst and hunger, as for 21 days the boat drifted in the Gulf Stream. They saw eleven ships, one of which, a British bark, they were convinced had seen them, but sailed away.

Finally, on 25 September the survivors were picked up off Cape Hatteras by the schooner Mosquito of Salem, Massachusetts. They were so weak that they were barely able to climb aboard, and one fell into the sea and had to be rescued by the Mosquito's cook. One man subsequently died as they were being taken to Santiago de Cuba. The remaining seven survivors were returned to the United States via Nassau, Bahamas aboard the steamship Santiago on 19 October.

Two of the survivors, seaman Ludwig Loder and fireman Carl Graves, later admitted that the survivors had been driven by hunger to cannibalism. In the first 15 days they had only a single fish and a few small sea birds to eat, shared between 11 men. On the 16th day seaman William Davis, encouraged by another, August Plagge, attacked Loder with a knife and had to be restrained. That night Plagge committed suicide by jumping overboard. The next day seaman William Robinson died, and the survivors decided to eat him. The cook William Wright was ordered to dismember the body. Thomas Hunt, the 3rd Engineer, died two days later and was also eaten.
