= SS Wardha =

British-built merchant steamship

History
- Name: Wardha
- Namesake: Wardha
- Owner: 1887: British India SN Co; 1913: Fratelli Bruzzo; 1915: E Ghisler; 1917: A Corrado fu GB
- Port of registry: 1887: (United Kingdom of Great Britain and Ireland) Glasgow; 1913: (Kingdom of Italy) Genoa
- Builder: A Stephen & Sons, Linthouse
- Yard number: 295
- Laid down: 1884
- Launched: 7 July 1887
- Completed: 1887
- Identification: UK official number 93394; 1887: code letters KMVJ; 1913: code letters STVH
- Fate: scrapped 1923

General characteristics
- Type: cargo ship
- Tonnage: 3,917 GRT, 2,552 NRT
- Length: 350.0 ft (106.7 m)
- Beam: 47.2 ft (14.4 m)
- Depth: 20.3 ft (6.2 m)
- Decks: 2
- Installed power: 311 NHP
- Propulsion: 1 × triple-expansion engine; 1 × screw
- Sail plan: 2-masted brigantine
- Speed: 11 knots (20 km/h)
- Notes: sister ship: Warora

SS Wardha was a merchant steamship that was built in Scotland in the 1880s and scrapped in Italy in 1923. She was one of a pair of sister ships that were designed to carry cotton, but completed for the British India Steam Navigation Company (BI) to carry sugar. In 1899 she carried troops and cavalry horses for the Second Boer War. In the 1900s she took Indian indentured labourers to British Guiana and Fiji. From 1913 onward she passed through a succession of Italian owners, but kept her original name.

== Building ==
In 1884 Alexander Stephen and Sons of Linthouse, Glasgow, laid down a pair of cargo ships for Hume, Smith and Company of Liverpool. Their beam was relatively broad in proportion to their length, as they were designed to carry baled cotton from New Orleans to Liverpool. While they were being built, Hume, Smith went into liquidation, leaving yard numbers 295 and 296 incomplete.

The two incomplete hulls lay in Stephen's shipyard until 1887, when BI had them completed. 295 was launched on 7 July as Wardha, followed by 296 on 18 August as Warora.

Wardha's registered length was 350.0 ft (106.7 m), her beam was 47.2 ft (14.4 m) and her depth was 20.3 ft (6.2 m). Her tonnages were 3,917 GRT and 2,552 NRT.

She had a single screw, driven by a three-cylinder triple-expansion engine that was rated at 311 NHP and gave her a speed of 11 knots (20 km/h). She had two masts, and was rigged as a brigantine.

== BI career ==
BI registered Wardha at Glasgow. Her United Kingdom official number was 93394 and her code letters were KMVJ.

BI at first used both Wardha and Warora to import sugar from Mauritius to India.

All BI ships were designed to be converted into troop ships, by putting troop accommodation in the holds. In the Second Boer War the UK Government chartered at least 37 BI ships for war service. On 24 September 1899 in Bombay (now Mumbai) she embarked part of the 9th Queen's Royal Lancers. On 9 October she reached Durban, and from there she tried to reach Cape Town. A gale off East London damaged the ship, and killed nearly 100 of the cavalry horses aboard. Wardha turned back, and reached Durban again on 14 October. The lancers were transferred to the BI ship Avoca and Currie Line ship Nevada to resume their voyage to Cape Town. In 1900 Wardha took troops from Calcutta to Hong Kong.

After the Boer War, Wardha made three voyages taking Indian indentured labourers abroad, as shown in the table below. The first was to British Guiana in 1901. The others were to Fiji in 1905 and 1906.

British Guiana and Fiji voyages
Destination	Date of Arrival	Number of Passengers
British Guiana	1901	n/a
Fiji	28 July 1905	892
Fiji	28 June 1906	834

Wardha also carried horses from Australia to India. In August 1905 she loaded 162 horses in Melbourne, followed by 200 at Sydney, and 150 at either Pinkenba or Brisbane.

== Italian career ==
In November 1912 Fratelli Bruzzo ("Bruzzo Brothers") bought Wardha for £8,000. She was registered in Genoa, and her code letters were STVH. E Ghisler bought Wardha in February 1913, and sold her in 1917 to A Corrado fu GB. On 25 August 1920 a fire badly damaged the ship in Genoa. She was scrapped in Italy in 1923.

== See also ==
- List of Indian indenture ships to Fiji

== Bibliography ==
- Haws, Duncan (1987). British India S.N. Co. Merchant Fleets. Vol. 11. Burwash: Travel Creatours Ltd Publications. ISBN 0-946378-07-X.
- Lloyd's Register of British and Foreign Shipping. Vol. I.–Steamers. London: Lloyd's Register of Shipping. 1912 – via Internet Archive.
- Lloyd's Register of Shipping. Vol. I.–Steamers. London: Lloyd's Register of Shipping. 1914 – via Internet Archive.
- Lloyd's Register of Shipping. Vol. I.–Steamers. London: Lloyd's Register of Shipping. 1917 – via Internet Archive.
- Mercantile Navy List. London. 1888 – via Crew List Index Project.
