= Ebe W. Tunnell (pilot boat) =

Pennsylvania Pilot boat

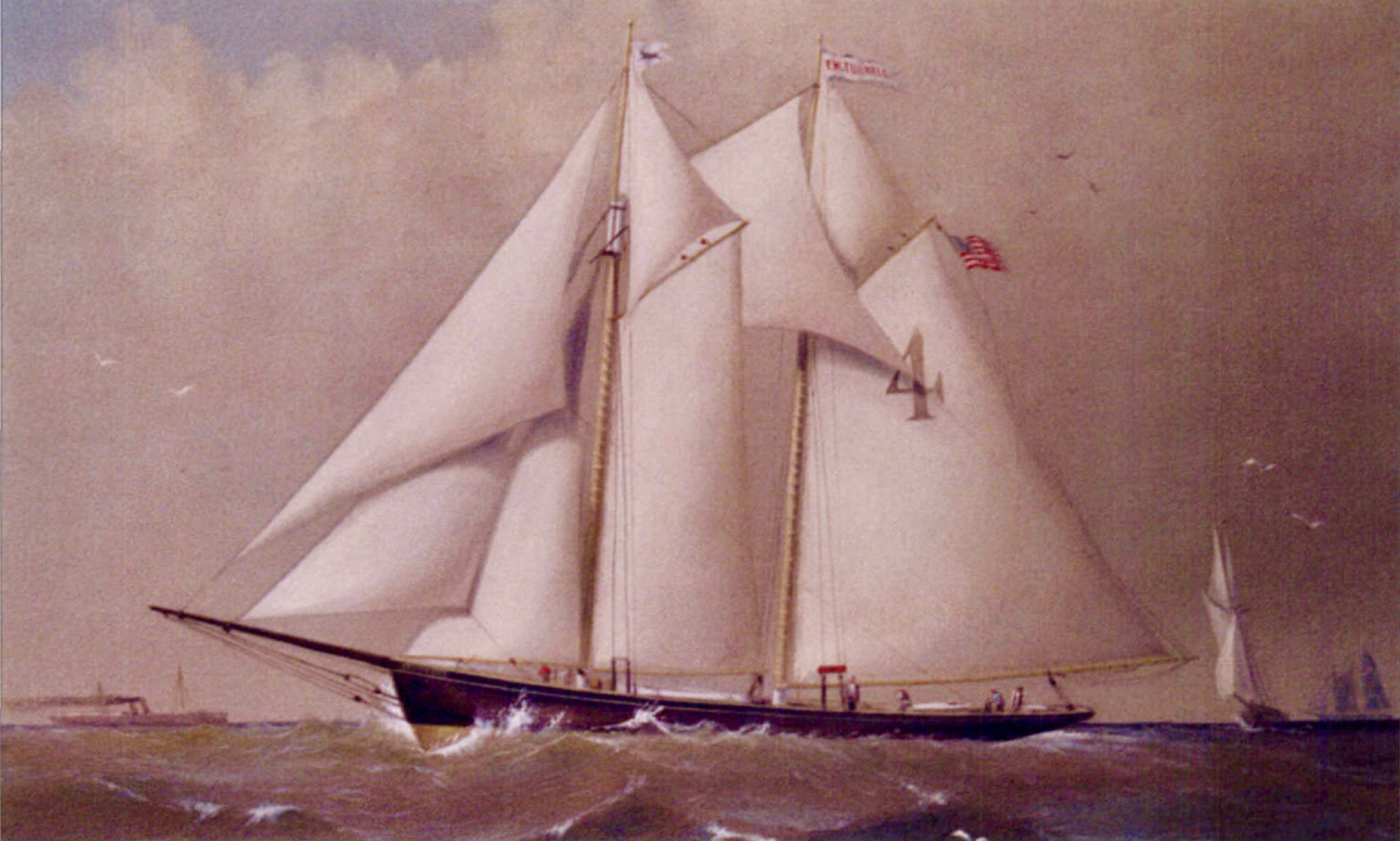
- Pilot boat Ebe W. Tunnell, No. 4.

History

United States
- Name: Ebe W. Tunnell
- Namesake: Ebe W. Tunnell, Governor of Delaware
- Owner: Delaware Pilots
- Operator: Captain A. W. Marshall Sr.; Captain James K. Rowland
- Builder: C. & R. Poillon
- Cost: $13,000
- Launched: 1887
- Christened: E. W. Tunnell
- Out of service: 1909
- Fate: Sold

General characteristics
- Class & type: schooner
- Length: 88 ft 0 in (26.82 m)
- Beam: 22 ft 0 in (6.71 m)
- Depth: 9 ft 0 in (2.74 m)

Ebe W. Tunnell was a 19th-century Delaware pilot schooner built in 1887 in Brooklyn, New York. In 1889, the Ebe W. Tunnell was driven out to sea in a fierce storm. The crew spent five days in turbulent waters before they were rescued. In the age of steam, Ebe W. Tunnell had outlived its usefulness and was sold as a houseboat for a group of men working in the Chesapeake Bay in 1909.

== Construction and service ==
Ebe W. Tunnell was a pilot schooner built at the C. & R. Poillon shipyard in 1887, at Brooklyn, New York for twelve licensed Delaware maritime pilots. She was launched on April 23, 1887, for service at the Delaware Breakwater. She cost $13,000 when fully equipped for service. She was named in honor of Ebe W. Tunnell, the then Governor of Delaware. She was No. 4 of the Delaware fleet.

The E. W. Tunnell, was registered as a pilot schooner with the Record of American and Foreign Shipping, from 1888 to 1900. She was listed as being built in 1887 at Brooklyn, New York; and her hailing port was the Lewes, Delaware. Her dimensions were 76.3 feet (23.3 m) in length; 20.5 feet (6.2 m) breadth of beam; 8.6 feet (2.6 m) depth of hold; and 60 tons tonnage.

The Delaware pilot boats Ebe W. Tunnell and the J. Henry Edmunds, of the Cape May pilots, kept to their assigned area at the Five Fathom Bank, which was 25 miles (40 km) miles east of Cape Henlopen until the Pilots' Association For The Bay & River Delaware was formed on November 28, 1896. This area was ideal for boarding steamers as it was on the direct line from Europe. After the Pilots' Association was formed, many of the Delaware pilot boats were purchased or sold.

In September 1889, Captain A. W. Marshall Sr. served as captain of the Ebe W. Tunnell when the vessel was driven out to sea in a fierce storm. The crew spent five days in turbulent waters before they were rescued. Captain John Barnes and James K. Rowland were two pilots aboard the Ebe W. Tunnell.

On August 13, 1897, Ebe W. Tunnell went down to the Delaware Breakwater to relieve the pilot boat Thomas F. Bayard as a tender to the new steamboat Pennsylvania.

When the Pennsylvania was purchased by the United States Navy on May 23, 1898, from the Philadelphia Pilots' Association, she was replaced by the two remaining pilot boats, the Ebe W. Tunnell and J. Henry Edmunds. The Philadelphia Pilots' Association took good care of her. In November 1899, they placed her on the railway at the Jackson and Sharp Company for general overhauling and repairs.

== End of service ==
In 1909, in the age of steam, the sailboat Ebe W. Tunnell had outlived her usefulness and was sold for $500.00. She became a houseboat for a group of men working in the Chesapeake Bay.

== See also ==
- List of Delaware Pilot boats
- Pilots' Association For The Bay & River Delaware
