= SS Lakeland =

Steel ship wrecked in Lake Michigan

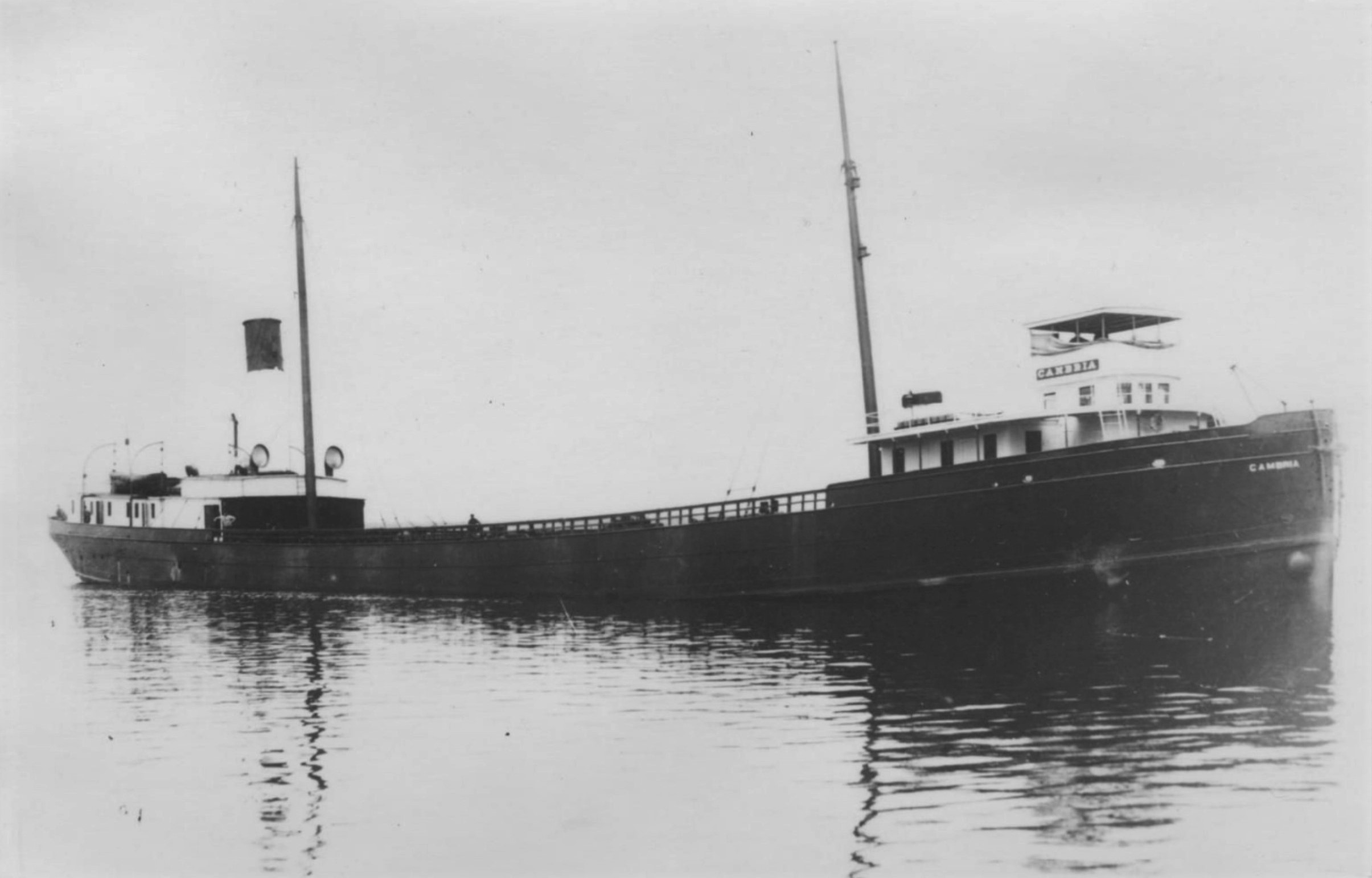
- The Lakeland when she was named Cambria

History

United States
- Name: Cambria 1887–1910; Lakeland 1910–1925
- Operator: Tri-State Steamship Company
- Builder: Globe Iron Works Company
- Yard number: 12
- Launched: February 1, 1887
- In service: June 1, 1887
- Out of service: December 3, 1924
- Identification: U.S. Registry #126420
- Fate: Sank on Lake Michigan

General characteristics
- Type: Bulk Freighter
- Tonnage: 1,878.10 GRT; 1,377.33 NRT
- Length: 300.6 ft (91.6 m)
- Beam: 39 ft (12 m)
- Depth: 24 ft (7.3 m)
- Installed power: 2 × Scotch marine boilers
- Propulsion: 1,200 hp (890 kW) triple expansion steam engine

National Register of Historic Places data
LAKELAND (steam screw) Shipwreck
U.S. National Register of Historic Places
Location within Wisconsin Location within the United States
Location	Door County, Wisconsin
Nearest city	Sturgeon Bay, Wisconsin
Coordinates	44°47.34′N 87°11.32′W
Built	1887
Architect	Globe Iron Works Company
Architectural style	Freighter
MPS	Great Lakes Shipwreck Sites of Wisconsin MPS
NRHP reference No.	15000403
Added to NRHP	July 7, 2015

SS Lakeland was an early steel-hulled Great Lakes freighter that sank on December 3, 1924, into 205 feet (62 m) of water on Lake Michigan near Sturgeon Bay, Door County, Wisconsin, United States, after she sprang a leak. On July 7, 2015, the wreck of the Lakeland was added to the National Register of Historic Places.

== History ==
The Lakeland (official number 126420) was built in 1887 in Cleveland, Ohio, by the Globe Iron Works Company as the first generation steel Great Lakes freighter Cambria. She was originally built for the Mutual Transportation Company which was controlled by the Federal Steel Company that was owned by Elbert H. Gary. She had an overall length of 300.6 feet (91.6 m), which made her the first 300-foot vessel on the lakes; she also had a length of 280 feet (85 m) between her perpendiculars, her beam was 39 feet (12 m) wide and her cargo hold was 24 feet (7.3 m) deep. She was powered by a 1,200 horsepower triple expansion steam engine which was fueled by two coal burning Scotch marine boilers. She had a gross tonnage of 1878.10 tons and a net tonnage of 1377.33 tons.

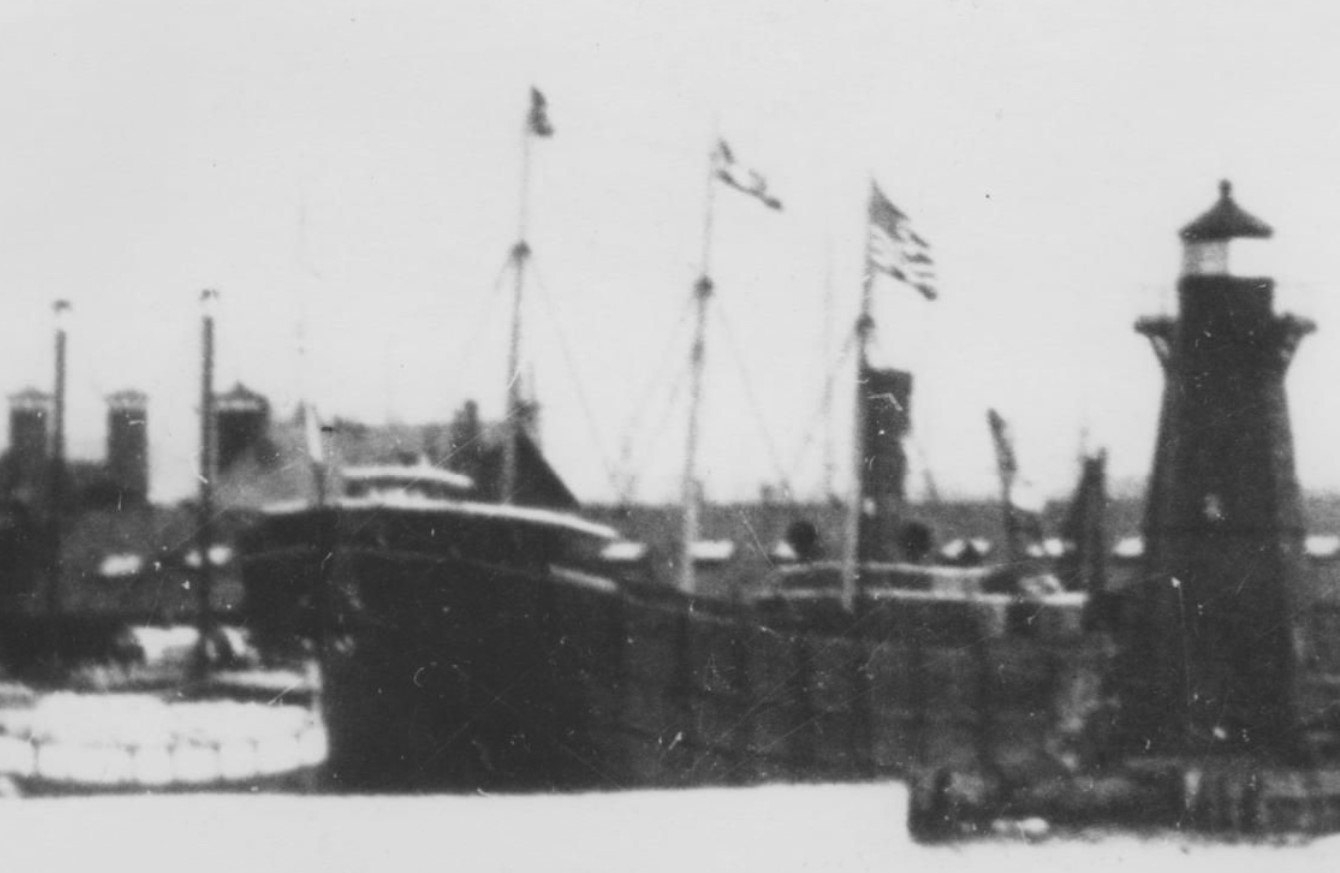
The earliest known photograph of the Cambria

The Cambria was launched in Cleveland on February 1, 1887, as hull number #12. At the time of her construction she was only the second lake freighter built by Globe Iron Works Company to have a steel hull. She was also the first lake freighter equipped with a triple expansion steam engine. She was used to haul bulk cargoes such as iron ore, coal, grain, salt and later automobiles.

In June 1888 the Cambria ran aground two miles (3.2 km) southwest of Peninsula Point Light on Lake Michigan with a cargo of iron ore weighing 2,334 tons. The grounding tore a hole in her hull.

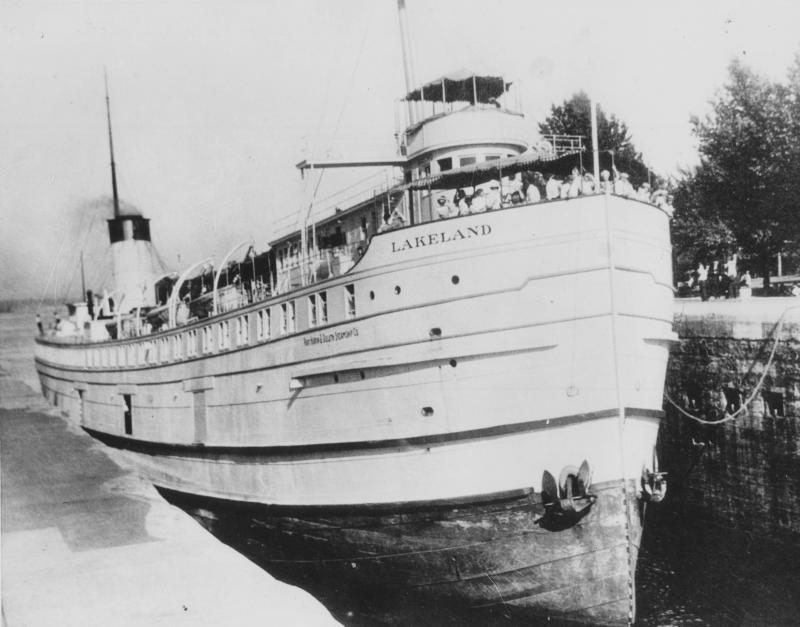
The Lakeland as a passenger steamer circa 1915

In 1910 the Cambria was taken to the Milwaukee Dry Dock Company to be converted to a passenger vessel, but the Milwaukee Dry Dock Company was unable to complete the conversion. Eventually the wrecking tug Favorite towed her to Cleveland for the conversion to be finished.

In May 1910 she was renamed Lakeland. In September 1910 the Lakeland collided with the steam barge John Smeaton in the St. Marys River. She ran aground after the collision. In early 1920 the Lakeland was converted from a passenger ship to an automobile carrying vessel.

The Lakeland did not sail for the 1923 season because she had a major overhaul. She had her boiler room moved; she also had a brand new watertight bulkhead installed. The other new things included two new Scotch marine boilers, and a new pilothouse. She also had her ballast pump repaired, and several cracked frames replaced. In the fall of 1924 the Lakeland went into a dry dock in Detroit, Michigan, to have a twisted rudder stock repaired; the inspectors also examined her entire hull and her rudder.

== Final voyage ==
On December 3, 1924, the Lakeland was sailing in calm conditions across Lake Michigan from Chicago, Illinois, to Detroit, Michigan, with a cargo of 22 Nash and Kissel, and 1 Rollin automobile in her hold. She had been experiencing some minor leakage, but it was manageable. At around 11:30A.M., the Lakeland sprang a serious leak. When her crew discovered the leak, they tried to keep the water out of her hull by turning her pumps to their full speed; but eventually the leak got so bad that Captain John McNeely was forced to turn the Lakeland around in an effort to reach shallow water. When the Lakeland was about 9 miles from shore it became obvious that the effort to keep her afloat was futile. Some of her crew abandoned ship via the lifeboats. Eventually the Ann Arbor No.6 came alongside the Lakeland, but Captain McNeely allegedly refused a tow from her. By the time the coast guard arrived, the Lakeland was listing to port at a dangerous angle. Eventually Captain Robert Anderson ordered the remaining men on the Lakeland to climb onto his cutter. Meanwhile, the steamer Signus stood by. The Lakeland sank stern first and broke in two. Her lights flickered until her deck disappeared beneath the surface.

As she sank, the radio operator on the Ann Arbor No.6, Elliot Jacobson took some photographs of her.

In mid-1925 the insurance company that owed the Lakeland's owners $450,000 started a search for her wreck to investigate the circumstances of her loss. Eventually the fishing tugs Albert C. and the Four Brothers discovered her wreck. Technical divers using new helium and oxygen technology were the first people to dive the wreck; this was also the first time mixed gas diving suits were put to a practical test on the lakes. The divers made several dives from the deck of the steam barge Chittendon. They made the discovery that all of the Lakeland's seacocks had been opened prior to her sinking.

The Thompson Transportation Company, the company that owned the Lakeland was taken to court by sixteen insurance companies; the insurance companies tried to prove that the Lakeland's captain scuttled her because of financial problems the Thompson Transportation Company was having. The case of her sinking went to court twice, but the insurance companies made a third attempt to take the case to court: eventually the findings went to the Lakeland's owners. It is believed that eventually the insurance companies came to an out of court agreement with the owners of the Lakeland.

== Wrecksite ==
The wreck of the Lakeland was rediscovered in 1960. She rests upright, in 205 feet (62 m) of water. Her steel hull is almost broken in two aft of the cargo elevator, and her wooden deckhouses are missing. This is because when she sank, the air that trapped in the upper deck structures pulled the wooden deck houses off her hull. The passenger deck on her bow has several cracks which allow divers to access her interior. In the 1970s a 1924 Rollin car was salvaged, but problems that occurred while salvaging led to the car being taken to a scrapyard. Another artifact that was retrieved was the Lakeland's brass steam whistle which is on display in the Door County Maritime Museum. Her anchor was also salvaged. There are still Nash and Kissel automobiles in her hold. Close by are the wrecks of several other ships including the large wooden bulk carriers Australasia and the Frank O'Connor, the wooden steamer Louisiana which was lost during the Great Lakes Storm of 1913, the schooner Christina Nilsson and the steamboat Joys.
