= Hopper barge =

Type of barge for bulk cargo

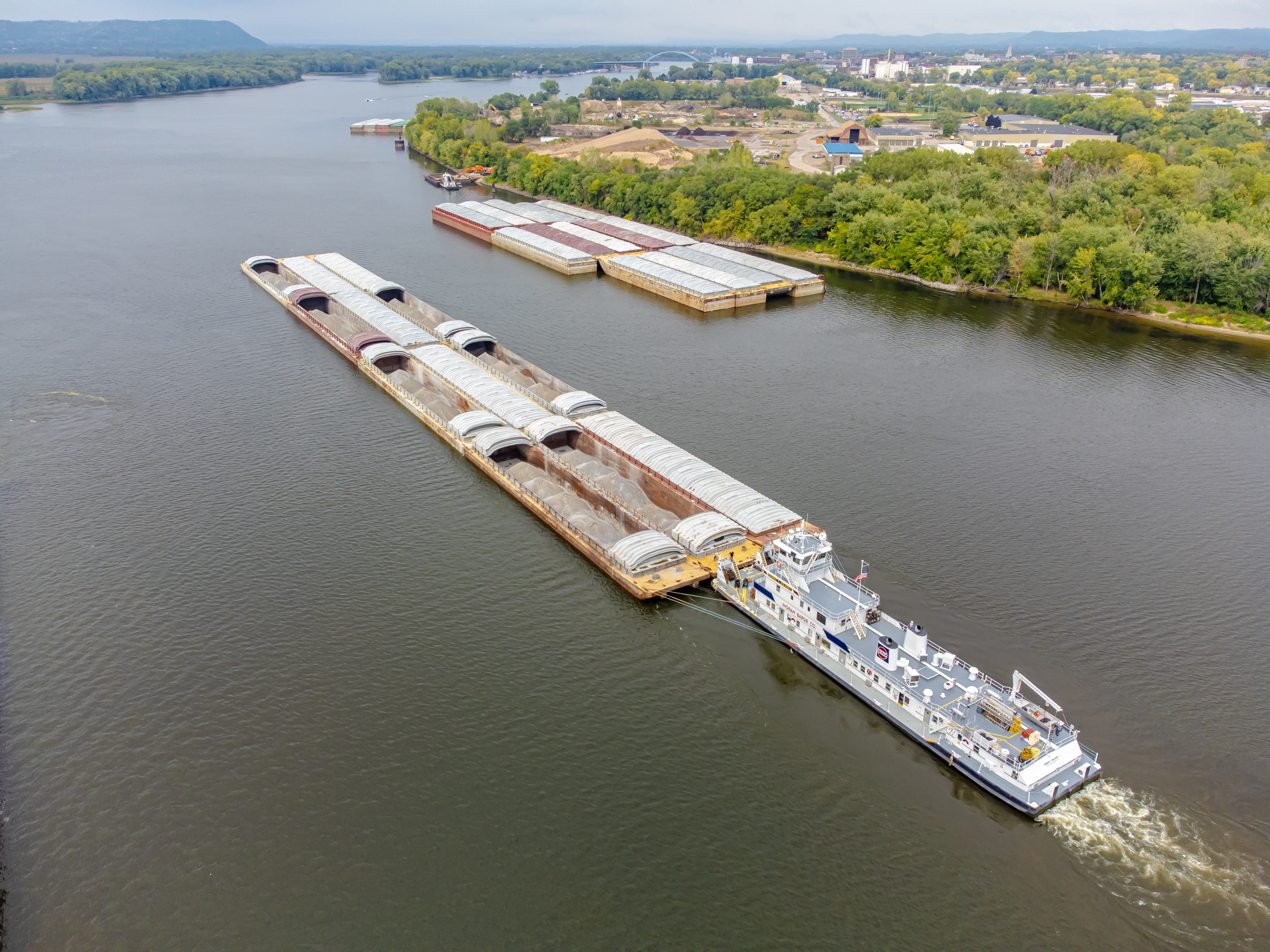
Hopper barge going through La Crosse County harbor

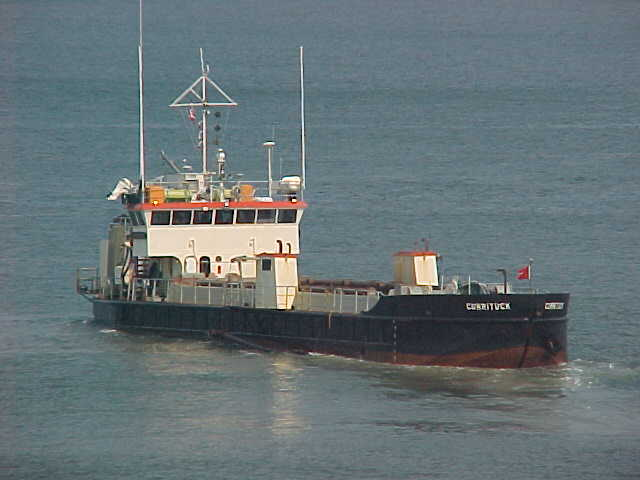
Split hopper dredge Currituck at Virginia Beach.

A hopper barge is a type of barge commonly designed to transport commodities like coal, steel, rocks, sand, soil and waste. 'Hopper barge' can also refer to a barge that dumps cargo at sea. These are now commonly called 'split hopper barge', because they split along the length of the hull. Split hopper barges can be non-propelled or self-propelled .

== History ==
The term 'hopper barge' surfaces in the second half of 19th century England, especially in relation to dredging. The word 'hopper' has multiple meanings. The hopper car is a well known use, but hopper can also mean: "any of various other receptacles for the temporary storage of material". By the 1890s, iron hopper barges used in dredging had doors in the hull for quickly dumping their load on the sea floor.

The 1950s American hopper barge descended from the welded steel barge, which replaced wooden cargo carriers. The steel barge offered better protection for the cargo, and required little maintenance.

In the 1950s hopper barges ranged from 800 to 3,500 tons.

== Characteristics ==
A hopper barge differs from other barges by having a hopper. This is the area of the open cargo hold. It may be unloaded either by bulk-handling cranes, or by being constructed with some mechanism to dump the contents through the bottom of the hull.

Hopper barges are usually of double-hull construction. This means that the sides and bottom of the cargo hold are separated from the hull by void spaces. This is done because the hopper barge has to resist heavy external impacts, as well as the heavy blows of unloading buckets into it. Internal bracing in the internal space transmmits the impact of loading to a larger area, and so ensures that the side shell of the hopper barge is not deformed.

Non self-propelled hopper barges are seen in two distinctive types; raked hopper and boxed hopper barges. Single raked barges are raked (tapered in depth) at the bow only. Double raked barges are tapered at both bow and stern.

== Hopper barge variants ==
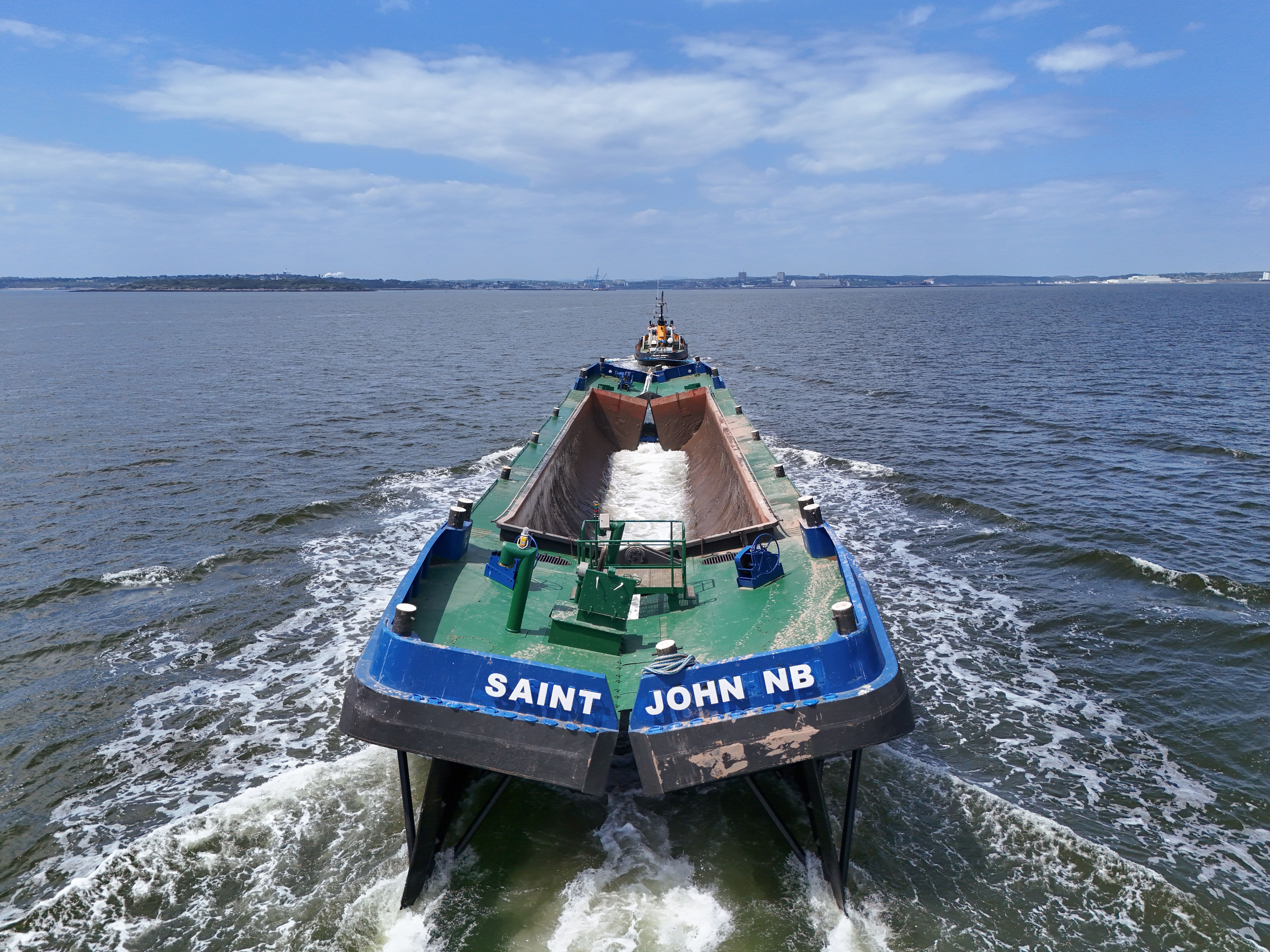
Split barge in Saint John, New Brunswick

=== Open hopper barge ===
The open hopper barge is generally used to carry ores and steel on inland waterways.

=== Dump hopper barge ===
A barge where the hopper is closed at the bottom by doors, which can be opened to dump the contents. This is done at sea, to dispose of unwanted wastes, rather than to unload a useful cargo.

=== Covered hopper barge ===
In the United States, covered hopper barges generally have steel hatch coverings operating on roller bearings. These quickly open and close over a wide section of the hold and are watertight. As the covers can generally expose about half of the hold, these enable vertical loading. Another type of cover is the lift-off (stacking) type cover.

Covered hopper barges transport grains and other agricultural products, salt, steel products, paper products, minerals, and sometimes packaged products.

=== Split hopper barge ===
Split hopper barges are used to dump cargo at sea. This comes mostly from dredging. The split hopper barge is the successor to the hopper barge with doors in the hull, which dumped its cargo by opening these doors.

The hull of the split hopper barge splits longitudinally between the end bulkheads. The vessel consists of two major moving parts (port and starboard halves), both are mostly symmetrical in design. Both parts of the vessel are hinged at the deck and operated by hydraulic cylinders. When the vessel splits the load is dumped rapidly, which means the barge has to be very stable in order not to capsize or otherwise get damaged.

== See also ==
- Grain bin – Storage container for dry grain

== Sources ==
- "Evolution of the inland barge", Proceedings of the merchant marine council, vol. 15, The Merchant Marine Council of the United States, pp. 140–141, 1958
- "Hopper Barges". McDonough Marine Service. 2012.
- Consolazio, Gary R.; Walters, Robert A.; Harper, Zachary S. (2012), Development of Finite Element Models for Studying Multi-barge Flotilla Impacts (PDF), Department of Civil and Coastal Engineering University of Florida
- Webster, John James (1887), "Dredging operations and appliances", Minutes of Proceedings of the Institution of Civil Engineers, vol. LXXXIX, The Merchant Marine Council of the United States, pp. 2–113
- "Hopper noun". Merriam-Webster. 2023.
- "Tees engineering improvements, dredging", Proceedings of the Institution of Mechanical Engineers, the Institution of Mechanical Engineers, pp. 321–323, 1893
