= List of ship launches in 1870 =

The list of ship launches in 1870 includes a chronological list of some ships launched in 1870.

Date	Ship	Class	Builder	Location	Country	Notes
1 January	Agnes Ann Wignell	Schooner	Irvine Shipbuilding Company	Irvine	United Kingdom	For John Wignell.
1 January	Crosby	Steamship	Messrs. T. & W. Smith.	North Shields	United Kingdom	For Messrs. T. & W. Smith.
3 January	Vanguard	Audacious-class battleship	Laird, Son & Co.	Birkenhead	United Kingdom	For Royal Navy.
4 January	Harlech Castle	Merchantman	Messrs. R. & J. Evans & Co.	Liverpool	United Kingdom	For Messrs. Cole & Jones.
4 January	Marmion	Steamship	W. Pile & co	Sunderland	United Kingdom	For J. R. Kelso.
5 January	Historian	Cargo ship	Harland & Wolff	Belfast	United Kingdom	For T. & J. Harrison.
13 January	Bethany	Barque	W. Briggs	Sunderland	United Kingdom	For Richardson & Co.
13 January	Zenobia	Barquentine	Messrs. J. & A. Lambert	Ipswich	United Kingdom	For private owner.
15 January	Guyana	West Indiaman	Messrs. D. & A. Fullarton	Ayr	United Kingdom	For James Ewing & Co.
17 January	Fethi Bulend	Corvette	Thames Ironworks and Shipbuilding Company	Leamouth	United Kingdom	For Ottoman Navy.
18 January	Linn Fern	Schooner	Messrs. Scott & Linton	Dumbarton	United Kingdom	For Messrs. J. & R. Neill, and Messrs. D. Whyte & Co.
18 January	Rainton	Steamship	Messrs. Leckie, Wood & Munro	Torry	United Kingdom	For William Scott and Peter Brantingham.
19 January	Sydenham	East Indiaman	Messrs. Alexander Stephen & Sons	Kelvinghaugh	United Kingdom	For private owner.
20 January	Australia	Steamship	Messrs. Robert Duncan & Co.	Port Glasgow	United Kingdom	For Messrs. Handyside & Henderson.
21 January	Loch Lomond	Full-rigged ship	J. G. Lawrie	Whiteinch	United Kingdom	For Glasgow Shipping Co.
24 January	Sprite	Steamship	Messrs. C. & W. Earle	Hull	United Kingdom	For Messrs. Lofthouse, Glover & Co.
29 January	Carpio	Steamship	Bowdler, Chaffer & Co.	Seacombe	United Kingdom	For Serapio Acebel y Compagnia.
29 January	Lufra	Clipper	Messrs. Hall	Footdee	United Kingdom	For Messrs. Anderson & FCo.
31 January	County of Lancaster	Merchantman	Messrs. Charles Connell & Sons	Overnewton	United Kingdom	For Messrs. R. & J. Craig.
31 January	Evora	Steamship	W. Pile & Co.	Sunderland	United Kingdom	For Ryde & Co.
31 January	Italo Platense	Steamship	Messrs. J. & W. Dudgeon	Cubitt Town	United Kingdom	For Compania de Navigacion a Vapor Italo Platense.
31 January	Maipu	Merchantman	Messrs. Aitken & Mansel	Whiteinch	United Kingdom	For M. Bordes.
January	Duncraig	Merchantman	Archibald M'Millan & Son	Dumbarton	United Kingdom	For Messrs. Finlayson.
January	Emily	Sailing barge	Messrs. J. & A. Lambert	Ipswich	United Kingdom	For private owner.
January	Gungner	Clipper	Peterson	Porsgrund	Norway	For private owner.
January	Hercules	Steamship	T. B. Seath & Co.	Rutherglen	United Kingdom	For Trinity House.
January	Sikh	Merchantman	Lawrench Hill & Co.	Port Glasgow	United Kingdom	For Alexander Russell.
1 February	Batavia	Steamship	Messrs. William Denny & Bros.	Dumbarton	United Kingdom	For Messrs. Burns & MacIver.
1 February	Blackadder	Clipper	Maudslay, Sons & Field	Greenwich	United Kingdom	Jock Willis & Sons.
1 February	Caspian	Steamship	London & Glasgow Shipbuilding Co. (Limited)	Glasgow	United Kingdom	For private owner.
2 February	Ching-too	Schooner	W. Adamson	Sunderland	United Kingdom	For William Adamson.
3 February	Jessie	Schooner	Messrs. A. M'Millan & Son	Dumbarton	United Kingdom	For Alexander M'Lennan.
5 February	Mabel	Steamship		West Hartlepool	United Kingdom	For Messrs. Norton & Co.
15 February	Mathilde	Steamship	Messrs. John Fullarton & Co.	Paisley	United Kingdom	For private owner.
15 February	Odin	Steamship	Messrs. Backhouse & Dixon	Middlesbrough	United Kingdom	For private owner.
16 February	City of Corinth	East Indiaman	Messrs. Barclay, Curle & Co.	Stobcross	United Kingdom	For Messrs. George Smith & Sons.
17 February	Bulgarian	Cargo ship	Harland & Wolff	Belfast	United Kingdom	For J. Bibby & Sons.
18 February	Priam	Steamship	Messrs. Scott & Co.	Greenock	United Kingdom	For Alfred Holt.
19 February	Abyssinia	Breastwork monitor	Messrs. J. & W. Dudgeon	Cubitt Town	United Kingdom	For Royal Navy.
19 February	Glamorganshire	Full-rigged ship	John Batchelor, or Batchelor Bros.	Cardiff	United Kingdom	For Batchelor & Co.
19 February	Marsden	Steamship	Messrs. Humprhy & Pearson	Hull	United Kingdom	For Messrs. Brownlow, Marsden & Co.
22 February	Mima Thomas	Steamship	Messrs. Richardson, Duck & Co.	South Stockton	United Kingdom	For Messrs. R. Byrne & Co.
28 February	Bio-Bio	Merchantman	Messrs. Aitken & Mansel	Whiteinch	United Kingdom	For M. Bordes.
1 March	Iron Duke	Audacious-class battleship		Pembroke Dockyard	United Kingdom	For Royal Navy.
2 March	Magdala	Cerberus-class monitor	Thames Ironworks and Shipbuilding Company	River Thames	United Kingdom	For Royal Navy.
3 March	Abyssinia	Ocean liner	J. & G. Thomson	Govan	United Kingdom	For Cunard Line.
3 March	Ban-Righ	Steamship	John Elder	Fairfield	United Kingdom	For Aberdeen Steam Navigation Company.
4 March	Helene	Paddle steamer	Messrs. William Hamilton & Co.	Port Glasgow	United Kingdom	For Messrs. John & James Thompson.
5 March	Moldavia	Steamship	Messrs. Denton, Gray & Co.	West Hartlepool	United Kingdom	For Messrs. Baker, Berend & Co.
7 March	Elizabeth Morton	Brigantine	E. Robertson	Ipswich	United Kingdom	For Mr. Morton.
8 March	Oxford Eight	Fishing trawler	Messrs. John Wray & Son	Burton Stather	United Kingdom	For John Harrison.
9 March	Rona	Steamship	Messrs. H. Murray & Co.	Port Glasgow	United Kingdom	For private owner.
15 March	Hampshire	Merchantman	Messrs. Robert Steele & Co.	Greenock	United Kingdom	For Messrs. Money Wigram & Co.
16 March	Loch Leven	Full-rigged ship	J. G. Lawrie	Whiteinch	United Kingdom	For Glasgow Shipping Co.
16 March	Lord Palmerston	Barque	Mr. Bartlett	Southampton	United Kingdom	For Mr. Richardson.
16 March	Sarah	Schooner	Robert Johnston	Carrickfergus	United Kingdom	For Mr. Brown and others.
17 March	Garonne	Merchantman	Messrs. Dobie & Co.	Govan	United Kingdom	For M. A. D. Bordes.
17 March	Ina	Steam yacht	Messrs. Henderson, Coulborn & Co.	Renfrew	United Kingdom	For Mr. Anderson.
17 March	Jason	Merchantman	Messrs. Barclay, Curle & Co.	Stobcross	United Kingdom	For Messrs. Andres & J. H. Carmichael.
17 March	Leucadia	Clipper	Messrs. Walter Hood & Co.	Aberdeen	United Kingdom	For Shaw Savill Line.
17 March	Maud	Steamship	Messrs. Denton, Gray & Co.	West Hartlepool	United Kingdom	For Messrs. J. B. Morton & Co.
19 March	Eaton Hall	Clipper	Messrs. Thomas Royden & Son	Liverpool	United Kingdom	For Thames & Mersey Line.
19 March	Hotspur	Ironclad ram	Messrs. Robert Napier & Son	Govan	United Kingdom	For Royal Navy.
19 March	Magdala	Steamship	Messrs. Withy, Alexander & Co.	Hartlepool	United Kingdom	For Messrs. T. Appleby, Ropner & Co.
19 March	Triumph	Schooner	Barnes & Roberts	Ramsgate	United Kingdom	For James Barnes.
19 March	Wisconsin	Steamship	Messrs. C. M. Palmer & Co.	Jarrow-on-Tyne	United Kingdom	For Guion Line.
21 March	City of Sparta	Merchantman	Messrs. Alexander Stephen & Sons	Kelvinhaugh	United Kingdom	For Messrs. George Smith & Sons.
22 March	Villa de Madrid	Steamship	Messrs. Thomas Wingate & Co.	Whiteinch	United Kingdom	For Don José Gambe.
24 March	Louisa	Steamship	Messrs. J. & R. Swan	Kelvindock	United Kingdom	For Messrs. J. & J. Hay.
30 March	Thomas Wilson	Steamship	Messrs. C. & W. Earle	Hull	United Kingdom	For Messrs. T. Wilson, Sons & Co.
March	Danube	Merchantman	Compagnie de L'Ocean	Bordeaux	France	For private owner.
March	Rollo	Steamship	Messrs. Charles & William Earle	Hull	United Kingdom	For Messrs. Thomas Wilson & Sons.
2 April	Italy	Steamship	Messrs. John Elder & Co.	Glasgow	United Kingdom	For National Steam Navigation Company (Limited).
2 April	Leeming	Steamship	Bowdler, Chaffer & Co.	Seacombe	United Kingdom	For Strong, Reid & Page.
2 April	Pleiad	Yacht	Messrs. Camper & Nicholson	Gosport	United Kingdom	For private owner.
4 April	Gwendoline	Schooner	Messrs. Camper & Nicholson.	Gosport	United Kingdom	For Major Ewing.
4 April	Walter Menzalch	Steamship	Messrs. Pearson & Lockwood	Stockton-on-Tees	United Kingdom	For private owner.
5 April	Australia	Steamship	Messrs. Caird & Co.	Greenock	United Kingdom	For Peninsular and Oriental Steam Navigation Company.
5 April	Gazelle	Coaster	Read	Portsmouth	United Kingdom	For Messrs. H. & J. Ash.
5 April	Maggie Trimble	East Indiaman	Messrs. Alexander Stephen & Sons	Kelvinhaugh	United Kingdom	For R. G. Sharp.
7 April	Vale of Nith	Barque	Messrs. McCulloch, Paterson & Co.	Port Glasgow	United Kingdom	For Messrs. John Hay & Co.
13 April	Calcium	Steamship	Messrs. Bewley, Webb & Co.	Dublin	United Kingdom	For J. F. Bewley.
14 April	Erato	Steamship	Messrs. Humprhys & Pearson	Hull	United Kingdom	For Messrs. Thomas Wilson, Sons, & Co.
14 April	Russia	Steamship	Messrs. C. & W. Earle	Hull	United Kingdom	For Messrs. John F. Norwood & Co.
16 April	Africa	Steamship	Messrs. Charles Connell & Co.	Overnewton	United Kingdom	For John H. Watt.
16 April	Bohemian	Cargo ship	Harland & Wolff	Belfast	United Kingdom	For J. Bibby & Sons.
16 April	Cambois	Brig	Union Co-operative Shipbuilders & Floating Dock Co.	Blyth	United Kingdom	For private owner.
16 April	Marie Ange	Brig	Messrs. Nevill Bros.	Llanelly	United Kingdom	For Messrs. Buesnell, Lequesne & Co.
16 April	Sherbro	Steamboat	John White	Cowes	United Kingdom	For "Colonial Government of Western Africa".
16 April	Thistle	Steam yacht	Messrs. Blackwood & Gordon	Port Glasgow	United Kingdom	For Duke of Hamilton.
19 April	Antonin	Merchantman	Messrs. Dobie & Co.	Govan	United Kingdom	For Messrs. E. Alexander & Sons, or M. A. D. Bordes.
19 April	Benmore	East Indiaman	Messrs. John Reid & Co.	Port Glasgow	United Kingdom	For Messrs. Nicholson & M'Gill.
19 April	St. Winifred	Paddle steamer	Messrs. W. C. Miller & Sons	Garston	United Kingdom	For Holywell and Liverpool Steam Packet Co. Ltd.
21 April	Abbotsford	Steamship	Messrs. Blackwood & Gordon	Port Glasgow	United Kingdom	For Messrs. George Gibson & Co.
28 April	Clansman	Steamship	Messrs. James & George Thompson	Govan	United Kingdom	For Messrs. David Hutcheson & Co.
30 April	Amazon	Steamship	Messr. Withy, Alexander & Co	Hartlepool	United Kingdom	For Messrs. S. J. Glover & partners.
30 April	Carrick Castle	Paddle steamer	Messrs. John Fullarton & Co	Paisley	United Kingdom	For Lochgoil and Lochlong Steamboat Co.
30 April	Horsa	Steamship	Messrs. Henderson, Coulborn & Co.	Renfrew	United Kingdom	For private owner.
30 April	James Hall	Steamship	Messrs. Hall, Russell & Co.	Footdee	United Kingdom	For Aberdeen, Newcastle & Hull Shipping Co.
30 April	Leone	Paddle steamer	John Batchelor, or Batchelor Bros.	Cardiff	United Kingdom	For Societa Anonyme Dei Vapore Piocida Ischia.
30 April	Midsurrey	Steamship	Messrs. Palmer & Co.	Jarrow	United Kingdom	For private owner.
April	Annie	Schooner	M'Lea	Rothesay	United Kingdom	For William Whiteside.
April	Glengarnock	Coaster	Messrs. John Fullarton & Co.	Paisley	United Kingdom	For Messrs. Merry & Cunninghame.
April	Il Gioacchino Rossini	Merchantman		Genoa	Italy	For private owner.
April	John Wignall	Schooner	William Allsup	Preston	United Kingdom	For Wignall & Co.
April	La Pampa	Passenger ship	Messrs. Dudgeon	Cubitt Town	United Kingdom	For Compania de Navigacion a Vapor Italo Platense.
April	Meggie	Sloop	Gibbon & Nichol	Sunderland	United Kingdom	For Matthew Gibbon.
2 May	Corisand	Steamship	W. Pile & Co.	Sunderland	United Kingdom	For G. J. Hay.
2 May	Craigrownie	Paddle steamer	Messrs. Robert Duncan & Co.	Port Glasgow	United Kingdom	For Greenock and Helensburgh Steam Packet Co, or Graham Brymner.
3 May	Janet Holt	Barque	William Kinloch	Kingston	United Kingdom	For John M'Donald.
5 May	Guinea	Buffel-class monitor	Rijkswerf	Amsterdam	Netherlands	For Royal Netherlands Navy.
10 May	Onoba	Steamship	Messrs. J. & R. Swan	Maryhill	United Kingdom	For Tharsis Sulphur and Copper Company (Limited).
11 May	James Gordon Bennett	Pilot boat	Lawrence & Foulks	Williamsburg, New York	United States	For New Jersey Pilots.
13 May	Tenedos	Eclipse-class sloop		Devonport Dockyard	United Kingdom	For Royal Navy.
14 May	Blythwoode	Steamship	Messrs. Denton, Gray & Co.	West Hartlepool	United Kingdom	For Messrs. Watts, Milburn & Co.
14 May	Galeed	Steamship	James Laing	Sunderland	United Kingdom	For J. F. Middleton and others.
14 May	May	Steamship	Messrs. Denton, Gray & Co.	West Hartlepool	United Kingdom	For Mr. Herskind and others.
14 May	Rio Bento	Steamship	Messrs. Bewley, Webb & Co.	Dublin	United Kingdom	For Peter Stuart.
14 May	Winsloe	Steamship	Bowdler, Chaffer & Co.	Seacombe	United Kingdom	For Strong, Reid & Page.
16 May	Victoria	Steamship	Messrs. Henderson, Coulborn & Co.	Renfrew	United Kingdom	For West African Company (Limited).
17 May	Aconcagua	Merchantman	Messrs. Laird Bros.	Birkenhead	United Kingdom	For private owner.
17 May	Gorm	Monitor		Copenhagen	Denmark	For Royal Danish Navy.
17 May	King Arthur	Barque	Messrs. Turnbull & Son	Whitby	United Kingdom	For private owner.
17 May	Oceola	Barque	Messrs. John Reid & Co.	Port Glasgow	United Kingdom	For Messrs. Alexander Ramage & Co.
18 May	Firth of Clyde	Barque	Messrs. M'Culloch, Patterson & Co.	Port Glasgow	United Kingdom	For Messrs. A. & J. Brown.
18 May	Thuringia	Steamship	Messrs. Caird & Co.	Greenock	United Kingdom	For Hamburg-Amerikanische Packetfahrt-Actien-Gesellschaft.
19 May	Glad Tidings	Schooner		Carrickfergus	United Kingdom	For Henry Gowan.
19 May	Loanda	Steamship	John Elder	Govan	United Kingdom	For British and Africa Steam Navigation Co.
24 May	Burns	Steamship	Messrs. Dobie & Co.	Govan	United Kingdom	For Messrs. Doward, Dickson & Co.
28 May	Ægean	Steamship	London and Glasgow Engineering and Iron Shipbuilding Co.	Govan	United Kingdom	For Charles Williamson.
28 May	Spindrift	Barquentine	Bowdler, Chaffer & Co.	Seacombe	United Kingdom	For Thomas Gann.
30 May	Birdston	East Indiaman	Messrs. A. M'Millan & Son	Dumbarton	United Kingdom	For Messrs. Singleton, Dunn & Co.
30 May	Dunloe	East Indiaman	Messrs. Dobie & Co.	Govan	United Kingdom	For T. O. Hunter.
30 May	Fuxing	Gunboat	Foochow Arsenal	Foochow	China	For Imperial Chinese Navy.
31 May	Sultan	Central battery ironclad		Chatham Dockyard	United Kingdom	For Royal Navy.
May	Foxhound	Cutter	W. Fyfe & Son	Fairlie	United Kingdom	For Marquess of Ailsa.
May	Island Lass	Schooner	Joseph & Nicholas Butson	Bodinnick or Polruan	United Kingdom	For John Rickards.
May	London	Schooner	Messrs. H. Murray & Co.	Port Glasgow	United Kingdom	For private owner.
May	Nola	Barque	Messrs. Barclay, Curle & Co.	Stobcross	United Kingdom	For J. Kelso, Jr.
May	Pervenche	Merchantman	M. Curet	La Seyne-sur-Mer	France	For MM Sacarello & Lachaud.
May	Sidonian	Steamship	Messrs. Robert Duncan & Co.	Port Glasgow	United Kingdom	For Messrs. Handyside & Henderson.
Unknown date	Perseverance	Humber keel	Joseph Burton	Selby	United Kingdom	For Mr. Pease.
4 June	Hallowe'en	Clipper	Maudslay, Son & Field	Greenwich	United Kingdom	For Jock Willis & Sons.
4 June	Nooya	Steam yacht	Messrs. Laird Bros.	Birkenhead	United Kingdom	For private owner.
4 June	Zaripha	Steamship	Bowdler, Chaffer & Co.	Seacombe	United Kingdom	For Edward D. Glynn.
6 June	Glasglyn	Barque	Messrs. A. M'Millan & Son	Dumbarton	United Kingdom	For private owner.
9 June	Perseverance	Humber Keel	Burton	Selby	United Kingdom	For Mr. Pease.
10 June	Fram	Steamship	Messrs. Blackwood & Gordon	Port Glasgow	United Kingdom	For Messrs. Turnbull & Salveson, or D. Jacobsen.
11 June	Almendral	Merchantman	Messrs. Laird Bros.	Birkenhead	United Kingdom	For private owner.
11 June	Lillie	Steamship	Messrs. Withy,	Middleton	United Kingdom	For Messrs. George Pyman & Co.
11 June	Quito	Steamship	Messrs. Earle	Hull	United Kingdom	For Messrs. Wilson, Sons & Co.
11 June	Oxford	Steamship	Messrs. Humprhys & Pearson	Hull	United Kingdom	For Messrs. Bailey & Leatham.
11 June	Reiher	Steamship	Messrs. Earle	Hull	United Kingdom	For Norddeutsche Lloyd.
11 June	Tom Pyman	Steamship	Messrs. Denton & Gray	Hartlepool	United Kingdom	For Messrs. George Pyman & Co.
13 June	Fleetwing	Pilot boat	Mr. Williams Jr.	Newport	United Kingdom	For Samuel Gilmore.
14 June	Steamship	For Messrs. Thidemann, Cairns & Gillies.	Wallsend	Owen Wallis	Messrs. Schlesinger, Davis & Co	
14 June	Palatine	Steam yacht	Messrs. Robert Steele & Co.	Greenock	United Kingdom	For Earl of Wilton.
14 June	Peiho	Steamship	Messrs. William Denny & Bros.	Dumbarton	United Kingdom	For private owner.
14 June	Woodlark	Full-rigged ship	Messrs. Alexander Stephen & Sons	Kelvinhaugh	United Kingdom	For Messrs. Alexander Stephen & Sons.
14 June	Rance	Indre-class transport	Arsenal de Lorient	Lorient	France	For French Navy.
15 June	Sri Sarawak	Steamship	Messrs. Henderson, Coulborn & Co.	Renfrew	United Kingdom	For Borneo Company.
15 June	Swiftsure	Swiftsure-class ironclad	Palmers Shipbuilding and Iron Company	Jarrow	United Kingdom	For Royal Navy.
16 June	Blyth	Steamship	W. Pile & Co.	Sunderland	United Kingdom	For George Robinson Dawson.
16 June	Lebanon	Steamship	Messrs. Backhouse & Dixon	Middlesbrough	United Kingdom	For private owner.
18 June	Castor	Steamship	Messrs. A. & J. Inglis	Pointhouse	United Kingdom	For Koninklijke Nederlandse Stoomboot-Maatschappij.
18 June	Elgin	Steamship	Messrs. Aitken & Mansel	Pointhouse	United Kingdom	For Messrs. John Warrack & Co.
18 June	Frithiof	Steamship	Messrs. Schlesinger, Davis & Co.	Wallsend	United Kingdom	For Thule Company.
18 June	Longford	Paddle steamer	Messrs. Laird Bros.	Birkenhead	United Kingdom	For City of Dublin Steam Packet Company.
18 June	Wells	Steamship	Messrs. T. R. Oswald & Co.	Sunderland	United Kingdom	For Augustus W. H. Phrynn.
28 June	Lord of the Isles	Steamship	Messrs. R. Napier & Sons	Govan	United Kingdom	For Messrs. Shaw, Maxton & Co.
29 June	George Lockett	Steamship	Messrs. Backhouse & Dixon	Middlesbrough	United Kingdom	For private owner.
29 June	Tarapacá	Merchantman	Messrs. Dobie & Co.	Govan	United Kingdom	For M. A. D. Bordes.
30 June	Burgon	Steamship	Messrs. Richardson, Duck & Co.	Stockton-on-Tees	United Kingdom	For James Taylor.
30 June	City of Exeter	Steamship	Messrs. M. Pearse & Co.	Stockton-on-Tees	United Kingdom	For Messrs. Holman & Sons.
30 June	Ismalia	Steamship	Robert Duncan & Co.	Port Glasgow	United Kingdom	For Anchor Line.
30 June	Thomas Adam	Steamship	Messrs. Hall, Russel & Co.	Aberdeen	United Kingdom	For Messrs. Adam & Co.
June	Ailsa	Clipper	Messrs. Charles Connell & Co..	Overnewton	United Kingdom	For Messrs. Sandbach, Tinne & Co.
June	Amandine	Schooner	Messrs. William Fyfe & Son	Fairlie	United Kingdom	For J. S. Mills.
June	Athole	Steamship	Messrs. Alexander Stephen & Sons	Kelvinhaugh	United Kingdom	For Messrs. John Warrack & Co.
June	Cam	Schooner	H. Murray & Co.	Port Glasgow	United Kingdom	For private owner.
June	Eveleen	Cutter	Messrs. William Fyfe & Son	Fairlie	United Kingdom	For J. D. Keoch.
June	Glaslyn	Barque	Messrs. Archibald M'Millan & Son	Dumbarton	United Kingdom	For Henry Browse, Jr.
June	Jerome	Schooner	Messrs. H. Murray & Co.	Port Glasgow	United Kingdom	For private owner.
June	Kolosvar	Paddle steamer	Messrs. Miller & Co	Garston	United Kingdom	For Danubian Steam Navigation Co.
June	Louise Brown	Schooner	Irvine Shipbuilding Company	Irvine	United Kingdom	For private owner.
June	Renfrewshire	Steamship	Messrs. Blackwood & Gordon	Port Glasgow	United Kingdom	For James Turnbull.
June	Sea Gull	Steamship	Messrs. Barclay, Curle & Co.	Whiteinch	United Kingdom	For G. S. Seater & Co.
2 July	Lothair	Barque	William Walker	Rotherhithe	United Kingdom	For William Walker.
4 July	Liberia	Steamship	Messrs. John Elder & Co.	Govan	United Kingdom	For British and African Steam Navigation Company.
6 July	Konig Wilhelm I	Steamship	Messrs. Caird & Co.	Greenock	United Kingdom	For Norddeutscher Lloyd.
11 July	Admiral	Sloop	Teall	Leeds	United Kingdom	For private owner.
11 July	Contest	Sloop	Teall	Leeds	United Kingdom	For private owner.
12 July	Algeria	Steamship	Messrs. James & George Thomson	Govan	United Kingdom	For Cunard Line.
12 July	Elizabeth Latham	Schooner	William Ashburner	Barrow-in-Furness	United Kingdom	For Thomas Ashburner.
12 July	Valdivia	Steamship	Messrs. R.Napier & Sons	Govan	United Kingdom	For Pacific Steam Navigation Company.
13 July	Plucky	Ant-class gunboat	Robinson	Portsmouth Dockyard	United Kingdom	For Royal Navy.
16 July	Bonnie Kate	Steamship	T. R. Oswald	Sunderland	United Kingdom	For William Thompson.
16 July	Maggie	Steamship		Liverpool	United Kingdom	For private owner.
18 July	Margaret Banks	Steamship	Messrs. Denton, Gray & Co.	West Hartlepool	United Kingdom	For William Banks.
23 July	Dives	Indre-class transport	Arsenal de Brest	Brest	France	For French Navy
28 July	Border Chief	Clipper	Messrs. Redhead, Softley & Co.	South Shields	United Kingdom	For Messrs. Henry Adamson & Sons.
30 July	Alabama	Steam yacht	Messrs. Bewley	Dublin	United Kingdom	For Earl of Kingston.
30 July	Wymong	Steamship	Messrs. Palmer & Co.	Jarrow	United Kingdom	For private owner.
July	Campbeltown	Schooner	Robert M'Lea	Rothesay	United Kingdom	For Duncan M'Lean.
July	Ireland	Full-rigged ship		Quebec	Canada	For private owner.
July	Nina	Steamship	W. Watson	Sunderland	United Kingdom	For C. R. Fenwick.
July	Hispania	Steamship	Messrs. Scott & Co.	Greenock	United Kingdom	For Messrs. Mories, Munro & Co.
July	Ransome	Steamship	W. Hamilton & Co.	Port Glasgow	United Kingdom	For Newcastle and Ipswich Steam Navigation Co.
July	Treffry	Tug	Messrs. John Fullarton & Co.	Paisley	United Kingdom	For private owner.
8 August	Amethyst	Steamship	Messrs. J. & R. Swan	Kelvindock	United Kingdom	For William Robertson.
11 August	Andes	Steamship	Key	Kirkcaldy	United Kingdom	For Glasgow and South American Steam Shipping Co.
11 August	Queen of the Thames	Steamship	Messrs. Robert Napier & Sons	Govan	United Kingdom	For Messrs. Devitt & Moore.
11 August	St. Olaf	Steamship	Messrs. Backhouse & Dixon	Middlesbrough	United Kingdom	For private owner.
12 August	Pluto	Paddle steamer	J. G. Laurie	Whiteinch	United Kingdom	For British Government.
12 August	Valentine and Hélène	Merchantman	Messrs. Alexander Stephen & Sons	Kelvinhaugh	United Kingdom	For private owner.
13 August	Countess Vane	Tug	Robert Potts	Seaham	United Kingdom	For Earl Vane.
17 August	Atacama	Steamship	Messrs. John Elder & Co.	Govan	United Kingdom	For Pacific Steam Navigation Company.
17 August	Fawn	Steamship	W. Pile & Co	Sunderland	United Kingdom	For Stamp & Co.
25 August	Dande	Steamship	Messrs. Humphrys & Pearson	Hull	United Kingdom	For Messrs. Bailey & Leatham.
25 August	Fire King	Steamship	Messrs. Henderson, Coulborn & Co	Renfrew	United Kingdom	For Messrs. Lewis Potter & Co.
25 August	Mindoro	Steamship	Messrs. Thomas Wingate & Co.	Whiteinch	United Kingdom	For Messrs. Ker, Bolton & Co.
27 August	Baltic	Steamship	W. B. Hornby	Willington Quay	United Kingdom	For private owner.
27 August	Commissariat	Steamship	Messrs. Aitken & Mansel	Whiteinch	United Kingdom	For William Laing.
27 August	Enterprise	Steamship	Messrs. A. M'Millan & Son	Dumbarton	United Kingdom	For Messrs. M'Chrystal & Elliott.
27 August	Filey	Steamship	Messrs. Schlesinger, Davis & Co.	Wallsend	United Kingdom	For private owner.
27 August	Glengyle	Steamship	London and Glasgow Engineering and Iron Shipbuilding Co.	Glasgow	United Kingdom	For Messrs. Allan C. Gow & Co.
27 August	Oceanic	Oceanic-class ocean liner	Harland and Wolff	Belfast	United Kingdom	For White Star Line
27 August	Pollux	Steamship	Messrs. A. & J. Inglis	Pointhouse	United Kingdom	For Koninklijke Nederlandse Stoomboot-Maatschappij.
29 August	Eaglescliff	Steamship	Messrs. Pearse & Lockwood	Stockton-on-Tees	United Kingdom	For J. J. Smith.
31 August	Copiapo	Steamship	Bowdler, Chaffer & Co.	Seacombe	United Kingdom	For Compagnia Sud-Americana de Vapores.
August	Lanoma	Steamship	Robert Thompson	Sunderland	United Kingdom	For Culliford & Co.
August	South Western	Steamship	Messrs. Blackwood & Gordon	Port Glasgow	United Kingdom	For Messrs. Robert Henderson & Son.
7 September	Camel	Cargo ship	Harland & Wolff	Belfast	United Kingdom	For Harland & Wolff.
7 September	Ulpiano	Barque	William Watson	Sunderland	United Kingdom	For Ulpiano de Ondaza.
7 September	Volta	Steamship	Messrs. John Elder & Co.	Fairfield	United Kingdom	For British and African Steam Navigation Company.
8 September	Elena	Schooner	Messrs. A. & J. Inglis	Pointhouse	United Kingdom	For Messrs. M'Crindell, Schaw & Co.
10 September	Parthia	Ocean liner	William Denny and Brothers	Dumbarton	United Kingdom	For Cunard Line.
10 September	Topaze	Flotilla craft (schooner)	Chaigneau frères	Lormont	France	For French Navy
12 September	Bear	Steamship	Messrs. J. & G. Thomson	Govan	United Kingdom	For Messrs. Burns.
13 September	John Middleton	Steamship	Messrs. Denton & Gray	West Hartlepool	United Kingdom	For Messrs. Milburn, Watts & Co.
13 September	Kronprinz Friedrich Wilhelm	Steamship	Messrs. Caird & Co.	Greenock	United Kingdom	For Norddeutscher Lloyd.
14 September	Alexandria	Steamship	Messrs. Robert Duncan & Co.	Port Glasgow	United Kingdom	For Anchor Line.
15 September	Viking	Yacht	J. G. Lawrie	Whiteinch	United Kingdom	For Robert Macfie.
22 September	Maitland	Paddle steamer	McCulloch, Patterson & Co.	Port Glasgow	United Kingdom	For Newcastle & Hunter River Steamship Co. Ltd.
24 September	Gravina	Steamship	Bowdler, Chaffer & Co.	Seacombe	United Kingdom	For Serapio Acebel y Compagnia.
24 September	Hazard	Steamship	Messrs. Aitken & Mansel	Whiteinch	United Kingdom	For private owner.
27 September	Duke of Leinster	Steamship	Messrs. R. Duncan & Co.	Port Glasgow	United Kingdom	For Dublin and Glasgow Steam Packet Company.
27 September	Espresso	Steamship	Messrs. Wigham, Richardson & Co	Low Walker	United Kingdom	For private owner.
27 September	Houghton	Steamship	William Watson	Sunderland	United Kingdom	For H. T. Morton.
27 September	Triumph	Swiftsure-class ironclad	Palmers Shipbuilding and Iron Company	Jarrow	United Kingdom	For Royal Navy.
September	Virginia	Merchantman	Messrs. Stephens	Glasgow	United Kingdom	For private owner.
5 October	Tubal Cain	Fishing smack	Messrs. Gilbert & Cooper	Hull	United Kingdom	For Messrs. W. W. Dawson & Co.
10 October	Huelva	Steamship	Messrs. Denton, Gray & Co.	West Hartlepool	United Kingdom	For private owner.
10 October	Kirkstall	Steamship	Allibon, Noyes & Co.	Northfleet	United Kingdom	For Messrs. B. Dawson & Co.
10 October	Mary Blair	Schooner	Messrs. John Duthie & Co.	Aberdeen	United Kingdom	For Messrs. Houlder, Bros. & Co, or Messrs. James Owen & Co.
11 October	Bride	Full-rigged ship	W. Briggs	Sunderland	United Kingdom	For W. Briggs & Sons.
12 October	Shiraz	Steamship	Messrs. Alexander Stephen & Sons	Kelvinhaugh	United Kingdom	For Messrs. Grey, Dawes & Co.
22 October	Canopus	Steamship	Messrs. Earle	Hull	United Kingdom	For Messrs. J. Moss & Co.
22 October	Rosa	Steamshoip	Messrs. Denton, Gray & co	West Hartlepool	United Kingdom	For private owner.
22 October	Tiber	Steamship	London and Glasgow Iron Shipbuilding Company	Govan	United Kingdom	For Messrs. J. A. Dunckerley & Co.
24 October	Daylight	Barque	Chilton & Sidgwick	North Hylton	United Kingdom	For W. Rawell.
25 October	Cheops	Steamship	Messrs. Alexander Stephen & Son	Dundee	United Kingdom	For private owner.
25 October	Marina	Steamship	Messrs. Barclay, Curle & Co.	Stobcross	United Kingdom	For Messrs. Donaldson Bros.
25 October	Priness Louise	Steamship	Messrs. Richardson, Duck & Co.	South Stockton	United Kingdom	For private owner.
26 October	Fairy Dell	Steamship	Messrs. Iliff & Mounsey	Sunderland	United Kingdom	For Messrs. J. Watson & Partners.
27 October	Alert	Steamship	Messrs. Alexander Stephen & Sons.	Kelvinhaugh	United Kingdom	For private owner.
31 October	May Flower	Sloop	E. Robertson	Ipswich	United Kingdom	For J. May.
October	Alert	Thames barge	Thomas Bevan	Northfleet	United Kingdom	For John Messer Knight and Thomas Bevan.
October	Balogun	Brigantine	William Allsup	Preston	United Kingdom	For Kidd & Co.
October	Panther	Ironclad		Amsterdam	Netherlands	For Royal Netherlands Navy.
October	Saucy Lass	Cutter	Charles W. Aubin	Jersey	(United Kingdom of Great Britain and Ireland) Jersey	For Harvey & Co.
1 November	Clara	Coaster	Messrs. Tod & M'Gregor.	Glasgow	United Kingdom	For Messrs. L. Soler & Co.
Unknown date	Pride of the Ocean	Cutter	Barnes & Roberts	Ramsgate	United Kingdom	For Philip Bartlett.
5 November	Loch Urr	Barque	Messrs. M'Cullock, Patterson & Co.	Port Glasgow	United Kingdom	For Messrs. D. & J. Sproat.
8 November	Westmoreland	Steamship	Messrs. J. & G. Thomson	Govan	United Kingdom	For Messrs. Donald Currie & Co.
9 November	Ardentinny	Barque	Messrs. Archibald M'Millan & Son	Dumbarton	United Kingdom	For Robert Douglas & Son.
9 November	Graf Bismarck	Steamship	Messrs. Caird & Co.	Greenock	United Kingdom	For Norddeutscher Lloyd.
9 November	Orchis	Steamship	J. G. Lawrie	Whiteinch	United Kingdom	For Messrs. Hargrove, Fergusson & Jackson.
12 November	Antrim	Paddle steamer	Messrs. Robert Duncan & Co.	Port Glasgow	United Kingdom	For Barrow Steam Navigation Company.
12 November	Cambria	Steamship	Messrs. Parfitt & Jenkins	Cardiff	United Kingdom	For Cardiff & Portishead Steamship Company.
12 November	Joseph and Elizabeth	Fishing smack	Messrs. John Wray & Son	Burton Stather	United Kingdom	For J. Potter.
12 November	Lincolnshire Lass	Fishing smack	Messrs. John Wray & Son	Burton Stather	United Kingdom	For T. Boyd.
12 November	Valdes	Steamship	Bowdler, Chaffer & Co.	Seacombe	United Kingdom	For MacAndrews & Acebel.
15 November	Nelly	Schooner	Messrs. Stephen & Forbes	Peterhead	United Kingdom	For Alexander Bruce.
22 November	Huntcliffe	Steamship	Messrs. Richardson, Duck & Co.	South Stockton	United Kingdom	For James Taylon.
22 November	Lima	Barque	Messrs. Alexander Stephen & Sons	Kelvinhaugh	United Kingdom	For Wütjen & Co.
22 November	Migoto	Steamship	Messrs. W. Simons & Co.	Renfrew	United Kingdom	For Messrs. Hunter & Grange.
22 November	Viking	Steamship	Messrs. Dobie & Sons	Govan	United Kingdom	For Messrs. John M'Farlane & Co.
24 November	Glendarroch	Steamship	Alexander Stephen & Sons Ltd.	Linthouse	United Kingdom	For William Ross & Company.
24 November	Hector	Whaler	Messrs. Alexander Stephen & Sons	Dundee	United Kingdom	For private owner.
24 November	Matilda	Schooner	David Banks	Selby	United Kingdom	For Joshua Rhodes.
24 November	Parana	Steamship	Messrs. Bayley	Ipswich	United Kingdom	For private owner.
25 November	Ceres	Sloop	M'Lea	Rothesay	United Kingdom	For Neil Brown.
25 November	City of Poonah	Steamship	Messrs. Charles Connell & Co.	Kelvinhaugh	United Kingdom	For Messrs. George Smith & Sons.
26 November	Atlantic	Oceanic-class ocean liner	Harland and Wolff	Belfast	United Kingdom	For White Star Line.
26 November	Emblehope	Steamship	T. R. Oswald	Pallion	United Kingdom	For Thomas Henderson.
26 November	Newfield	Steamship	Robert Thompson & Sons	Sunderland	United Kingdom	For Wilkinson & Co.
26 November	Princess Louise	Steamship	Messrs. Thomas Wingate & Co.	Paisley	United Kingdom	For James Hamilton.
26 November	Vérité	Steamship	Messrs. John Elder & Co	Fairfield	United Kingdom	For MM. N. Paquet et Cie.
November	Benmore	Schooner	Robert M'Lea	Rothesay	United Kingdom	For Charles M'Eachran.
November	Deutschland	Coaster	Allibon, Noyes & Co.	Northfleet	United Kingdom	For Lübeck Finländische Dampfschiff Gesellschaft.
November	Emerald	Steamship	Messrs. Hall, Russell & Co.	Footdee	United Kingdom	For E. M. De Busche.
1 December	Asiatic	Cargo ship	Thomas Royden & Sons	Liverpool	United Kingdom	For White Star Line.
6 December	Bella	Sloop	M'Lea	Rothesay	United Kingdom	For Mr. King.
7 December	Blazer	Ant-class gunboat		Portsmouth Dockyard	United Kingdom	For Royal Navy.
7 December	Mendes Nuñez	Steamship	Messrs. R. Napier & Son	Govan	United Kingdom	For Messrs. A. Lopez & Co.
8 December	Comet	Ant-class gunboat		Portsmouth Dockyard	United Kingdom	For Royal Navy.
10 December	Churucca	Steamship	Bowdler, Chaffer & Co.	Seacombe	United Kingdom	For MacAndrews, Acebel y Compagnia.
10 December	City of Cambridge	Steamship	Messrs. Barclay, Curle & Co.	Stobcross	United Kingdom	For Messrs. George Smith & Sons.
10 December	Lively	Despatch vessel		Sheerness Dockyard	United Kingdom	For Royal Navy.
10 December	The Wonder	Fishing smack	John Gibson	Fleetwood	United Kingdom	For Thomas Leadbetter and others.
10 December	Zrinyi	Aurora-class corvette	Stabilimento Tecnico Triestino	Trieste	Austria-Hungary	For Austrian Navy.
12 December	Coquimbo	Steamship	Messrs. John Elder & Co.	Fairfield	United Kingdom	For Pacific Steam Navigation Company.
13 December	Enterprise	Steamship	Messrs. Henderson, Coulborn & Co.	Renfrew	United Kingdom	For E. M. de Bussche.
Unknown date	Limari	Cargo liner	Bowdler, Chaffer & Co.	Seacombe	United Kingdom	For Valparaíso Steamship Co.
19 December	Osborne	Royal yacht	Pembroke Dockyard	Pembroke	United Kingdom	For Queen Victoria.
22 December	Eagle	Whaler	Messrs. A. Stephen & Sons	Dundee	United Kingdom	For private owner.
22 December	Fu Po	Transport ship	Foochow Arsenal	Foochow	China	For Imperial Chinese Navy.
26 December	Suffren	Océan-class ironclad	Arsenal de Cherbourg	Cherbourg	France	For French Navy.
24 December	Lorne	Steamship	Messrs. Aitken & Mansel	Whiteinch	United Kingdom	For Messrs. John Warrack & Co.
27 December	Agra	Steamship	Messrs. William Denny & Bros.	Dumbarton	United Kingdom	For British India Steam Navigation Company.
December	Clairellen	Barque	John Gill	Pallion	United Kingdom	For W. A. Guesdon.
Unknown date	Amy	Steamship	William Doxford	Sunderland	United Kingdom	For William Stobart.
Unknown date	Ancient Briton	Merchantman	S. Hutchinson	Sunderland	United Kingdom	For Dove & Co.
Unknown date	Anlaby	Merchantman	T. R. Oswald	Sunderland	United Kingdom	For Robert Ash.
Unknown date	Argos	Merchantman	T. R. Oswald	Sunderland	United Kingdom	For Mr. Rosich.
Unknown date	Ariadne	Steamship	W. Pile & Co	Sunderland	United Kingdom	For Rhys & Sons.
Unknown date	Avon	Merchantman	T. R. Oswald	Sunderland	United Kingdom	For G. T. Gourley.
Unknown date	Beethoven	Steamship	W. Watson	Sunderland	United Kingdom	For G. Swainston.
Unknown date	Bertha	Steam trawler	George Bidder	Dartmouth	United Kingdom	For George Parker Bidder.
Unknown date	Berwickshire	Merchantman	William Pickersgill	Sunderland	United Kingdom	For G. Traill & Sons.
Unknown date	Brilliant Star	Schooner	William Pickersgill	Sunderland	United Kingdom	For T. Seed.
Unknown date	Wells	Merchantman	T. R. Oswald	Sunderland	United Kingdom	For Augustus W. H. Phrynn.
Unknown date	Burgos	Steamship	Messrs. Richardson, Duck & Co.	Stockton-on-Tees	United Kingdom	For Messrs. H. Briggs & Co.
Unknown date	Caledonia	Merchantman	James Laing	Sunderland	United Kingdom	For James Laing.
Unknown date	Canadian	Steamship	Robert Thompson	Sunderland	United Kingdom	For Culliford & Co.
Unknown date	Canton	Steamship	Messrs. Mitchell	River Tyne	United Kingdom	For private owner.
Unknown date	Celorio	Merchantman	J. Gill	Sunderland	United Kingdom	For Gallo & Hijo y-Hazas.
Unknown date	Ceylon	Merchantman	G. Bartram & Sons	Sunderland	United Kingdom	For J. H. Barry.
Unknown date	Charles Dickens	Merchantman	James Laing	Sunderland	United Kingdom	For G. Bell Jr.
Unknown date	Cheviot	Cargo ship	Charles Mitchell and Co.	Newcastle upon Tyne	United Kingdom	For William Howard Smith & Sons.
Unknown date	Cifuntes	Steamship	Messrs. Backhouse & Dixon	Middlesbroufgh	United Kingdom	For private owner.
Unknown date	C. M. Palmer	Steamship	Messrs. Palmer Bros.	Jarrow	United Kingdom	For Tyne Steam Shipping Co.
Unknown date	Commodore	Collier	Wigham, Richardson & Sons Ltd.	Newcastle upon Tyne	United Kingdom	For Hall John.
Unknown date	Corinth	Barque	W. Pile & Co.	Sunderland	United Kingdom	For T. B. Walker.
Unknown date	Coule	Steamship		Greenock	United Kingdom	For Norddeutscher Lloyd.
Unknown date	Cumberland	Merchantman	Chilton	Sunderland	United Kingdom	For Thomson & Co.
Unknown date	Cvjet	Barque	Richardson	Sunderland	United Kingdom	For Nicolo Stefano Bielovucich.
Unknown date	Davina	Barque	B. Hodgson	Sunderland	United Kingdom	For J. Smith.
Unknown date	Dexterous	Barque	Robert Thompson	Sunderland	United Kingdom	For G. & J. Robinson.
Unknown date	Diego Maria de Bolivar	Barque	J. Crown	Sunderland	United Kingdom	For L. de Bolivar.
Unknown date	Edith	Paddle steamer	A. Leslie and Company	Hebburn	United Kingdom	For London and North Western Railway.
Unknown date	Elemore	Merchantman	Iliff & Mounsey	Sunderland	United Kingdom	For Sharp & Co.
Unknown date	Elizabeth Childs	Barque	T. Metcalfe	Sunderland	United Kingdom	For G. Childs.
Unknown date	Elizabeths	Merchantman	B. Hodgson	Sunderland	United Kingdom	For G. Oates.
Unknown date	Ellias Loukatos	Brig	Gibbon	Sunderland	United Kingdom	For A. Vreones.
Unknown date	Ernest	Steamship	William Doxford	Sunderland	United Kingdom	For Fenwick & Co.
Unknown date	Ethel Anne	Merchantman	Liddle, or Liddle & Sutcliffe	Sunderland	United Kingdom	For Jones & Co.
Unknown date	Excelsior	Steamship	W. Pile & Co.	Sunderland	United Kingdom	For J. Wait.
Unknown date	Express	Steamship	W. Pile & Co	Sunderland	United Kingdom	For Banks & Mitchell.
Unknown date	Far West	Sternwheeler		Pittsburgh, Pennsylvania	United States	For Coulson Packet Company.
Unknown date	Frazilo	Steamship		Madeira	Portugal	For private owner. First steamship built on Madeira.
Unknown date	'Galatea	Steamship	W. Pile & Co	Sunderland	United Kingdom	For Ryde & Co.
Unknown date	Gift	Merchantman	Lester	Sunderland	United Kingdom	For J.& H. Lester.
Unknown date	Grand Canal	Tug	Bewley, Webb & Co.	Dublin	United Kingdom	For Grand Canal Company.
Unknown date	Halyma	Steamship	James Laing	Sunderland	United Kingdom	For E. T. Gourley & Co.
Unknown date	Harriet	Barque	John Thompson	Sunderland	United Kingdom	For J. Thompson.
Unknown date	Humbleton	Merchantman	J. Gill	Sunderland	United Kingdom	For Gayner & Co.
Unknown date	Hypathia	Merchantman	T. R. Oswald	Sunderland	United Kingdom	For Robert Hough.
Unknown date	James Thompson	Merchantman	Liddle, or Liddle & Sutcliffe	Sunderland	United Kingdom	For Thompson & Co.
Unknown date	John Elder	Steamship	Messrs. John Elder & Co.	Fairfield	United Kingdom	For Pacific Steam Navigation Company.
Unknown date	John Potts	Merchantman	Thompson	Sunderland	United Kingdom	For J. Potts.
Unknown date	Juno	Merchantman	Iliff & Mounsey	Sunderland	United Kingdom	For Mr. Hogartts.
Unknown date	Jupiter	barque	Iliff & Mounsey	Sunderland	United Kingdom	For Mitchell & Co.
Unknown date	Khedive	Merchantman	J. Robinson	Sunderland	United Kingdom	For Charles James Briggs.
Unknown date	Laira	Barque	W. Pile & Co.	Sunderland	United Kingdom	For Richard Hill.
Unknown date	Lanchester	Merchantman	James Laing	Sunderland	United Kingdom	For H. T. Morton.
Unknown date	Long Ditton	Merchantman	T. R. Oswald	Sunderland	United Kingdom	For Commercial Steamship Co. Ltd.
Unknown date	Maggie	Coaster	Mr. Brownrigg	Liverpool	United Kingdom	For George Bryant Sully.
Unknown date	Marbella	Merchantman	James Laing	Sunderland	United Kingdom	For William & Samuel S. Malcolm.
Unknown date	Maria	Barque	J. Crown	Sunderland	United Kingdom	For A. Galotola.
Unknown date	Marion	Steamship	Messrs. Lewis & Macilwaine	Belfast	United Kingdom	For private owner.
Unknown date	Marshall	Merchantman	Allan	Sunderland	United Kingdom	For Shaw & Co.
Unknown date	Mary Ann	Schooner	W. Adamson	Sunderland	United Kingdom	For W. Adamson.
Unknown date	Merope	Full-rigged ship	T. R. Oswald	Sunderland	United Kingdom	For Shaw Savill Line.
Unknown date	Molina	Steamship	Bowdler, Chaffer & Co.	Seacombe	United Kingdom	For MacAndrews & Acebel.
Unknown date	Moltke	Barque	Goddefroy-Zeit	Hamburg	Hamburg	For Fritze & Gerdes.
Unknown date	Myrtle	Merchantman	George Bartram & Sons	Sunderland	United Kingdom	For George Bartram.
Unknown date	Nenuphar	Merchantman	Short Bros.	Sunderland	United Kingdom	For Morgan & Co.
Unknown date	Norseman	Merchantman	T. R. Oswald	Sunderland	United Kingdom	For C. M. Webster.
Unknown date	Offerton	Merchantman	J. Gill	Sunderland	United Kingdom	For Gayner & Co.
Unknown date	Olga	Merchantman	James Laing	Sunderland	United Kingdom	For C. M. Norwood & Co.
Unknown date	Opyt	Steamship			Russia	For private owner.
Unknown date	Peace	Merchantman	Robert Thompson	Sunderland	United Kingdom	For J. Thompson.
Unknown date	Polino	Steamship	W. Pile & Co	Sunderland	United Kingdom	For D. G. Pinkney & Co.
Unknown date	Precursor	Steamship	Robert Thompson	Southwick	United Kingdom	For Jinman & Co.
Unknown date	Prynn	Merchantman	T. R. Oswald	Sunderland	United Kingdom	For Prynn & Co.
Unknown date	Rio Formoso	Steamship	Bowdler, Chaffer & Co.	Seacombe	United Kingdom	For G. F. Fisher.
Unknown date	Robert & Mary	Brig	Robert Potts	Seaham	United Kingdom	For R. Mushens.
Unknown date	Roseola	Schooner	Mr. Beeching	Wells-next-the-Sea	United Kingdom	For John Varley.
Unknown date	Rosland	Barque	J. Crown	Sunderland	United Kingdom	For W. Kish.
Unknown date	Said	Merchantman	James Laing	Sunderland	United Kingdom	For R. M. Hudson & Co.
Unknown date	Said	Merchantman	T. R. Oswald	Sunderland	United Kingdom	For private owner.
Unknown date	Saint Antoine	Merchantman	George Barker	Sunderland	United Kingdom	For M. J. M. Cairo.
Unknown date	Scotlant	Steamship	John Key	Kinghorn	United Kingdom	For Messrs. Stoddart.
Unknown date	Sea Spray	Brig	Spowers Bros.	Sunderland	United Kingdom	For M. H. Elliott.
Unknown date	Sesame	Schooner	J. Crown	Sunderland	United Kingdom	For Hill & Co.
Unknown date	Severn	Steamship	James Laing	Sunderland	United Kingdom	For E. T. Gourlay & Co.
Unknown date	Silkstone	Steamship	William Doxford	Sunderland	United Kingdom	For J. B. Pope & G. Pearson.
Unknown date	Solent	Merchantman	James Laing	Sunderland	United Kingdom	For Hill & Co.
Unknown date	Southwick	Barque	J. Crown	Sunderland	United Kingdom	For J. Crown.
Unknown date	Stafford	Barque	Short Bros.	Sunderland	United Kingdom	For W. Watson.
Unknown date	Stanton	Steamship	William Doxford	Sunderland	United Kingdom	For J. T. Stanton.
Unknown date	Stephensons	Merchantman	Iliff & Mounsey	Sunderland	United Kingdom	For Heald & Co.
Unknown date	Suzerain	Merchantman	Robinson	Sunderland	United Kingdom	For Hick & Co.
Unknown date	The Barton	Steamship	James Laing	Sunderland	United Kingdom	For John T. Stanton.
Unknown date	Thomas Howard	Pilot boat	William Cramp & Sons	Philadelphia, Pennsylvania	United States	For Philadelphia and Delaware Pilots.
Unknown date	Titian	Merchantman	Iliff & Mounsey	Sunderland	United Kingdom	For Glover Bros.
Unknown date	Triune	Barque	Gibbon & Nichol	Sunderland	United Kingdom	For W. Bedford.
Unknown date	Tweed	Steamship	James Laing	Sunderland	United Kingdom	For J. Morrison.
Unknown date	Un'yō	Gunboat	A. Hall & Co.	Aberdeen	United Kingdom	For Imperial Japanese Navy.
Unknown date	Vanguard	Steamship	W. Pile & Co.	Sunderland	United Kingdom	For J. R. Kelso.
Unknown date	Vivar	Steamship	Bowdler, Chaffer & Co.	Seacombe	United Kingdom	For Miguel Saenz y Compagnia.
Unknown date	Wellesley	Steamship			United Kingdom	For private owner.
Unknown date	Windermere	Merchantman			United Kingdom	For Black Ball Line.
Unknown date	Witness	Merchantman	Reay, or Reay & Naizby	Sunderland	United Kingdom	For H. Eggleston.
Unknown date	Yarra	Barque	William Watson	Sunderland	United Kingdom	For Richard William Cresswell.
Unknown date	Yavari	Steamship	Thames Ironworks and Shipbuilding Company	West Ham and Lake Titicaca	United Kingdom and Peru	For Peruvian Navy.
Unknown date	Zea	Schooner	W. Adamson	Sunderland	United Kingdom	For W. Adamson.
