= Cimba =

Clipper, built 1878

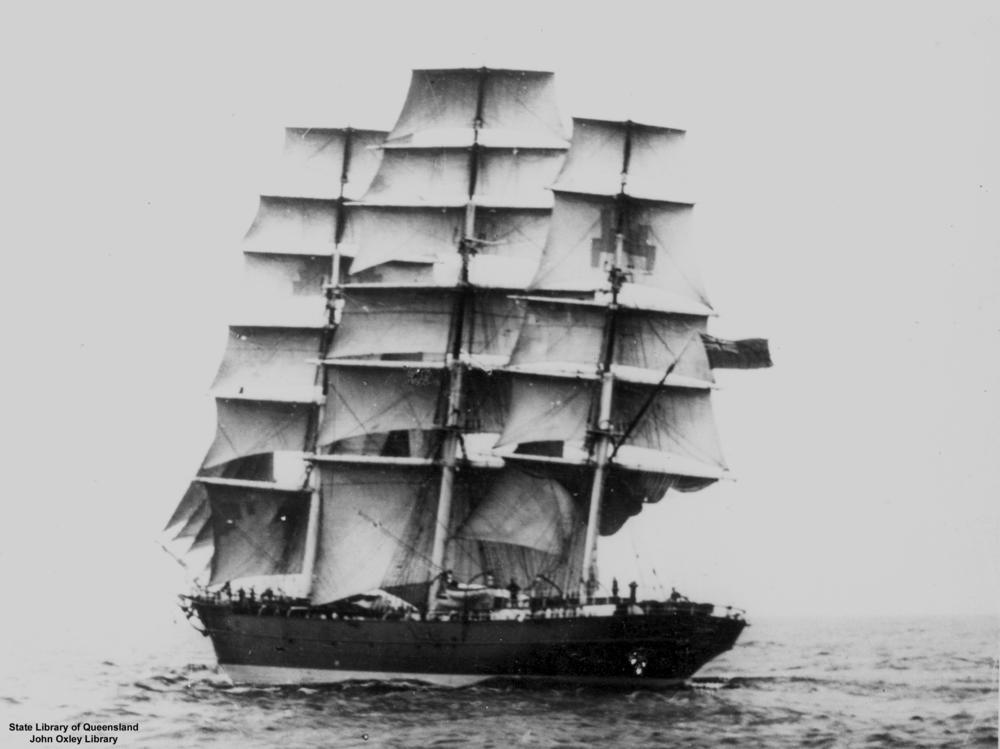
- Cimba

History

United Kingdom
- Name: Cimba
- Owner: A. Nicol & Co. Aberdeen
- Builder: A. Hood, Aberdeen
- Launched: April 1878

Norway
- Acquired: 1906 March, Sold to Norwegian owners.
- Fate: Stranded near Pointe Des Monts, 26 July 1915

General characteristics
- Type: Iron-hulled clipper
- Tons burthen: 1174 GRT, 1117 NRT; 1022 tons under deck
- Length: 223 ft (68 m)
- Beam: 34 ft 6 in (10.52 m)
- Draught: 21 ft 7 in (6.58 m)
- Sail plan: Full-rigged ship. "Rigged with royals, with double topgallant sails on the fore and main masts, and double gallant sails."
- Notes: British Reg. No. 77444; Signal RKJS

Cimba was a British-built clipper in the Australian wool trade. She sailed between London and Sydney for 20 years, from 1878 to 1898. In 1905, Cimba set the sailing ship record for a passage from Callao to Iquique, of 14 days.

== Construction ==
Cimba was an iron-hulled ship, built in Aberdeen in 1878. Her hull was painted green with gold scrolls, a yellow stripe, white bulwarks and white paint aloft. A lion was her figurehead.

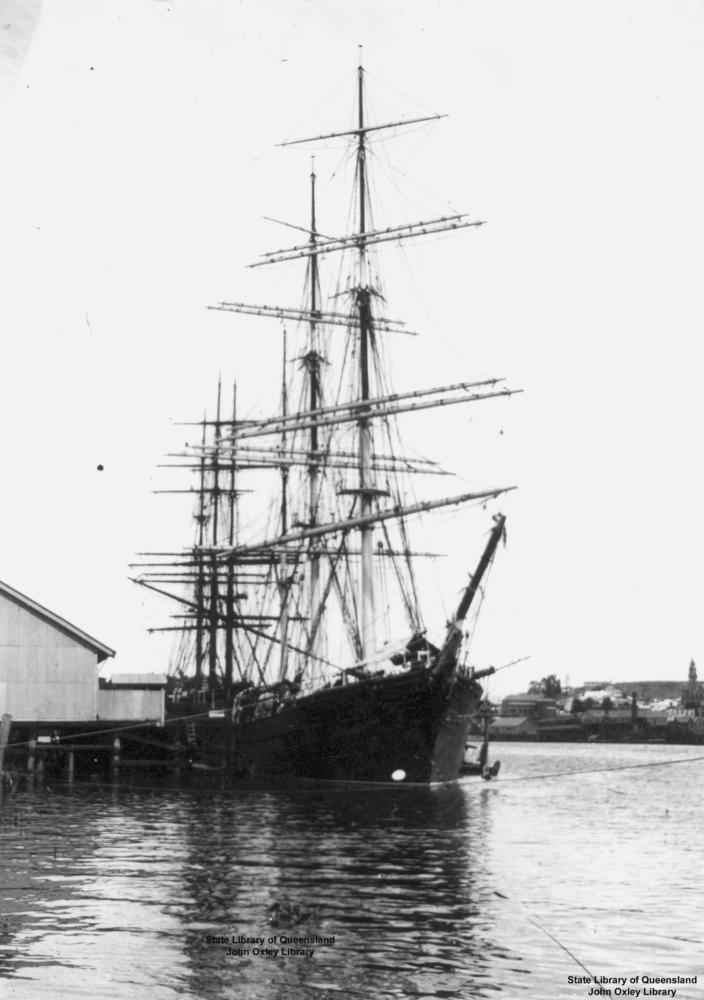
Cimba

Cimba was very heavily rigged, with her main lower masts a bit shorter than some clippers at 60 ft., and with heavy lower yards, the fore and main yards at over 4 tons apiece. She had the reputation of being a "tender" ship, i.e., heeling over easily under sail.

== Voyages ==
Cimba sailed in the wool trade between London and Sydney for 20 years, from 1878 to 1898, and was a regular visitor to Port Jackson for almost 30 years. Her first captain, J. Fimster, served until 1895, at which time Captain J. W. Holmes took over until her sale to Norwegian owners in 1906. Captain Holmes had served as third mate aboard Salamis, chief mate on the clippers Blackadder and Hallowe'en, and commander of the ship Leucadia.

Under her Norwegian owners, Cimba's chief cargo was lumber. She carried firewood from the Baltic to East Indian Dock in Aberdeen Bay, and made a fast passage from Dublin to the St. Lawrence of 14 days.

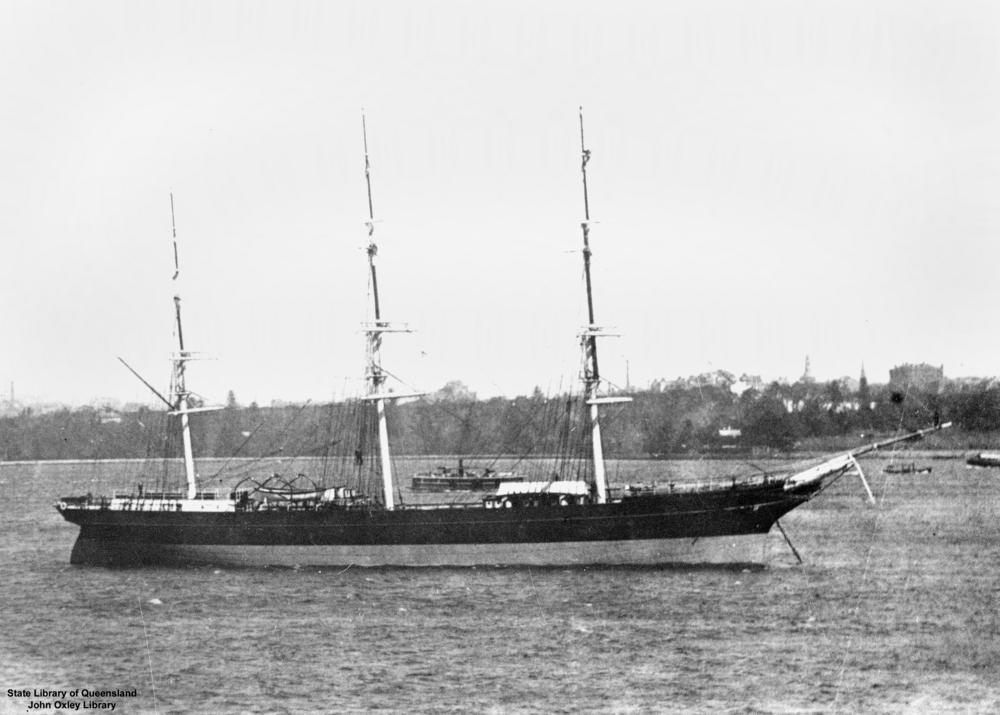
Cimba

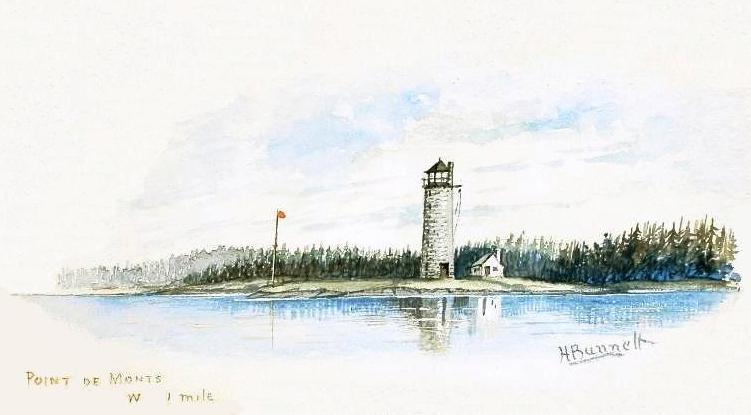
Point de Monts, Henry Richard S. Bunnett

== Loss of the ship ==
Cimba was stranded in the fog near Pointe Des Monts, 1 mile west, in the Gulf of St. Lawrence on 26 July 1915. She was en route to Matane from Liverpool, and was the last sailing vessel to be lost in this area.
