= Punjaub (ship) =

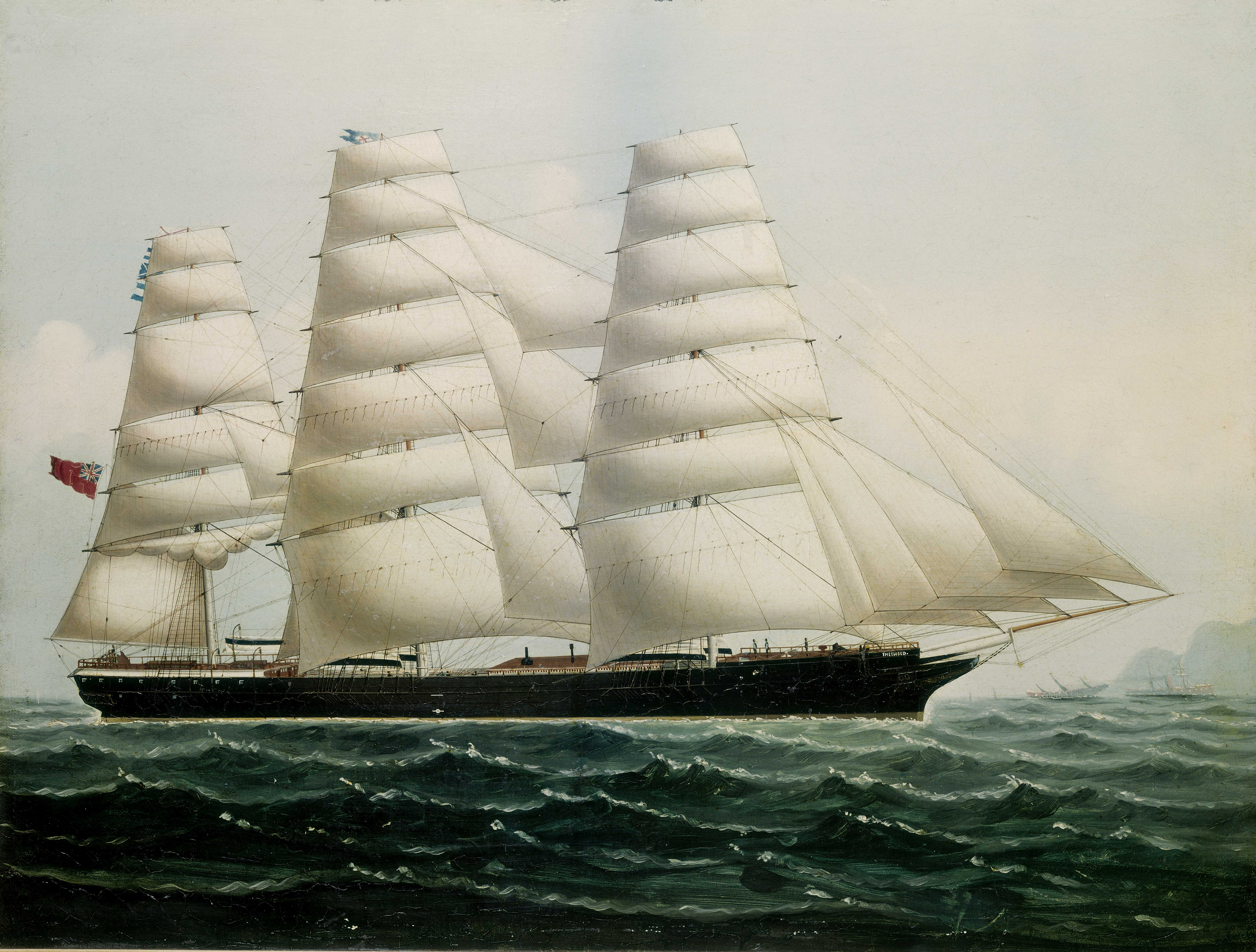
- The Tweed, converted to sail

History

United Kingdom
- Name: Punjaub (1854-62)
- Owner: East India Company
- Operator: Indian Marine
- Builder: Cursetjee Rustomjee
- Laid down: 1852
- Launched: 21 April 1854
- Identification: UK Official Number: 47422
- Fate: Disarmed, sold, converted to sail and renamed

History

United Kingdom
- Name: The Tweed
- Owner: John Willis and Son
- Acquired: 1862

General characteristics
- Class & type: frigate
- Tonnage: 1745 NRT
- Length: Hull: 250 ft (76.20 m); Overall:285 ft (86.87 m)
- Beam: 39 ft 6 in (12.04 m)
- Draught: 25 ft (7.62 m)
- Propulsion: sail plus 2x 700 hp engines driving paddles
- Armament: 10x 8in 68 pounder

Punjaub was a sail/paddle steamer frigate built for the Indian navy operated by the East India Company.

She was constructed in Bombay Dockyard by Cursetjee Rustomjee to a design by Oliver Laing. Launched 21 April 1854, the ship took part in the bombardment of Bushire during the Anglo-Persian War before the amalgamation of the Indian navy with the Royal navy led to her being sold as surplus to requirements. She was purchased by shipping line owner Jock Willis who changed her name to The Tweed and converted her to entirely sail propulsion. On 18 July 1888 the ship was dismasted off Algoa Bay and was towed to shore, but a subsequent storm drove her aground and she was damaged beyond economic repair.

Willis considered her to be a particularly fast ship. Although she was herself too large for the tea trade, he commissioned three clipper ships based on her hull design, Cutty Sark, Blackadder and Hallowe'en.

== Design and construction ==
Punjaub was one of the last two frigates to be built for the Indian Navy, together with her sister ship, Assaye. Punjaub was slightly longer overall than Assaye and launched a month later. Design is credited to Oliver Laing, but is believed to originate from the lines of an old French frigate. Master builder at the yard was Cursetjee Rustomjee, who was the fifth generation of his family to run the yard, which had a reputation for building strong, fast ships.

The ships were constructed entirely of Malabar Teak. Each had two auxiliary engines driving a paddle wheel, one either side of the ship. Although giving the benefit of moving against the wind, the paddles had the disadvantage of reducing the ships' speed when under sail. At this period it was often necessary to reserve coal for occasional use because of cost and supply difficulties. Fitting out was delayed awaiting arrival of the engines from Britain.

On 1 November Bombay was hit by a cyclone, which tore roofs off buildings, drove five square rigged ships, three steamers and 142 miscellaneous small ships aground. Assaye lost her bowsprit, broken against the castle walls.

== Indian History ==
=== In the Crimean War ===
The ship's first commander, John W. Young, took command 2 January 1855. At this point Britain was at war with Russia, and the ship was ordered to transport half of the 10th Hussars to the Crimea for use in the siege of Sebastapol. In six days the ship was equipped to house 250 horses for the journey. On 9 January she sailed for Suez together with the steam frigate Aukland, steam sloop Victoria and sailing transport Sultan, carrying the rest of the regiment. A second group of ships, Queen, Precursor, Earl of Claire, Earl Grey and Jessica carried part of the 12th Lancers also from Bombay while the rest of the regiment was brought from Mangalore by Assaye and Semiramis. Punjaub proved herself as a fast ship, having to reduce sail as well as not using steam, so the other ships could keep up. Commander Young and first officer Lieutenant Worsley were mentioned in dispatches for their effectiveness in the transport operation.

=== In the Anglo Persian War ===
On 11 May Commander Montriou was appointed commander, but as he was also Master Attendant of the dockyard, acting command fell to Lieutenant Alexander Foulerton. Punjaub became part of a squadron of nine warships under Rear Admiral Sir Henry Leeke on board Assaye, which was to land a force at Hallilah Bay as part of the Anglo-Persian War. Six steamers and 23 sailing ships also provided transport for 5,670 soldiers, 3750 non combatants, 1150 horses and 430 bullocks. The main force sailed from Bombay around 10 November, combined the whole force off Bunder Abbas on 24 November and landed troops on 6 December under cover of gunfire from the warships.

The expedition was hampered by a lack of landing craft for the artillery and animals but a beachhead was established in two days and the troops advanced northwards towards the village and fort of Reshire 4.5 miles away. Fighting proceeded house to house but the enemy were forced from the village on 9 November. The following morning an attack on Bushire began, with the ships getting in as close to shore as possible so as to bombard the town and stranding as the tide went out. The defenders artillery was generally less powerful, but damage was sustained by some of the closer ships. The British flag was raised over the residency at 5:30pm, the governor and important prisoners were taken on board Punjaub. Punjaub and Assaye returned to Bombay.

During the journey news was brought of a Persian force of 3000 men assembling to attack the depot station on Kism island. The two ships diverted to bombard the gathered force, then transferring the prisoners to Assaye, Punjaub was left to continue the defence of Kism.

=== the Indian uprising of 1857 ===
During the Indian Revolt of 1857, Punjab moved troops to pacify a rebel colony. Part of the crew of the frigate involved themselves in ground missions, during 25 May-14 June in Calcutta to capture the last Nawab of Awadh, Wajid Ali Shah; saving Dhaka from rebels on 22 November 1857.

== Reconstruction and renaming The Tweed ==
In 1862, the Navy decided to replace both the Punjaub and the Assaye. On 8 February, Punjaub and on 31 March, Assaye set sail for England. Upon arrival, they were found surplus to requirements for the Royal Navy and sold off in 1863 to new owner John "Jock" Willis - a shipping tycoon and founder of John Willis & Sons of London, also called the Jock Willis Shipping Line.

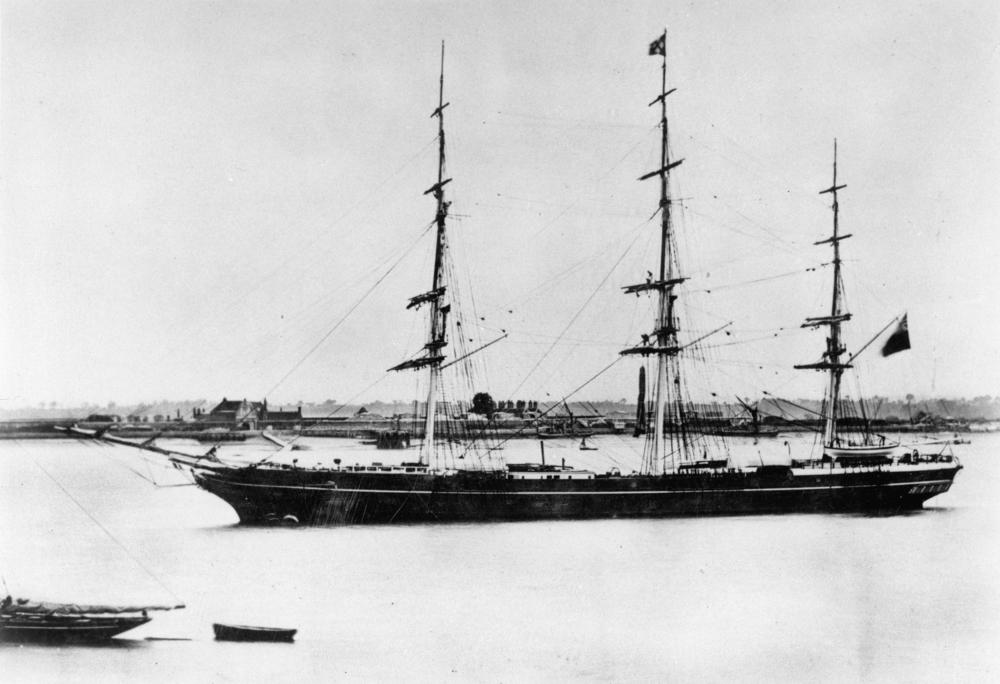
The Tweed moored in the Thames

Jock Willis sold with profit Assaye, and converted the Punjaub, into a Clipper taking out her engines, changing her name to The Tweed after the river in his native county of Berwickshire in the Scottish borders with England. In addition, she was also fitted out with a new figurehead of Tam O'Shanter, a character from the Robert Burns poem.

The new clipper, along with the Assaye and the Cospatrick, were hired in May 1864 by the British government for laying telegraph cables in the Persian Gulf.

Jock Willis, then put The Tweed in the hands of his most capable officer, Captain William Stewart, who managed to squeeze the best out of her, and from 1863 to 1877, made numerous passages between London and the colonies, breaking records, and bringing great profits for the company.
