= SS Philadelphia =

SS Philadelphia may refer to:

- SS Philadelphia (1867), US propeller. Sank on Lake Huron in 1893.
- SS Philadelphia (1885), a small steamship of 2,499 tons built by William Cramp & Sons for the Red D Line in 1885; service was between Venezuela and Caribbean ports and the Port of New York.
- SS Philadelphia (1888), the name from 1901 to 1918 and 1919 to 1923 for an ocean liner originally named SS Paris; served as USS Yale in Spanish–American War (1898) and as USS Harrisburg (ID-1633) during World War I (1918–19) for the United States Navy
- SS Philadelphia (1945), a container ship of Sea-Land Service; rebuilt from the former USS General A. W. Brewster (AP-155), a World War II transport ship of the United States Navy
