= Cuban gunboat Patria =

Cuban gunboat and training ship

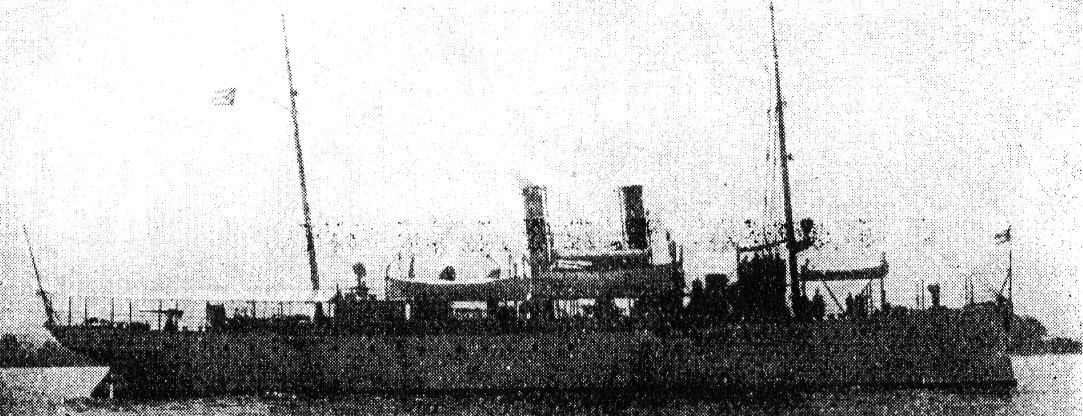
- Patria in 1914

History

Cuba
- Name: Patria
- Builder: William Cramp & Sons, Philadelphia
- Launched: October 10, 1911
- Commissioned: c. 1912
- Decommissioned: 1955

General characteristics
- Type: Gunboat/training ship
- Displacement: 1,200 t (1,200 long tons)
- Length: 61 m (200 ft 2 in)
- Beam: 11 m (36 ft 1 in)
- Draft: 4 m (13 ft 1 in)
- Propulsion: 2 steam engines with a total power of 4,000 hp (3,000 kW); 2 boilers; 2 propellers
- Speed: 16 knots (30 km/h; 18 mph)
- Complement: 115
- Armament: 2 × 57 mm guns (2 × single mount); 4 × 47 mm guns (4 × single mount); 4 × 37 mm guns (4 × single mount)

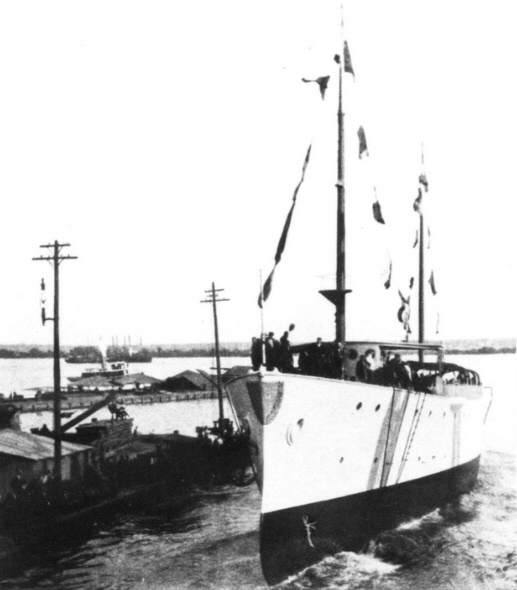
Launch of Patria in 1911

Patria was a gunboat and training ship of the Cuban Revolutionary Navy in the first half of the 20th century. A single vessel built in 1911 in the United States, it served during both world wars and was decommissioned in 1955.

The ship's displacement was 1,200 tons, powered by triple-expansion steam engines with a total output of 4,000 horsepower (3,000 kW), achieving a speed of 16 knots (30 km/h; 18 mph). Its armament initially comprised two 57 mm calibre guns, later upgraded to 76 mm, supplemented by lighter artillery.

== History ==
The Cuban Revolutionary Navy, established in 1909, relied primarily on gunboats, with the 500-ton Baire, built in 1906 in Gdańsk, as its first. In 1910, Cuba approved its first naval expansion program, ordering two large and two small gunboats abroad, making its navy one of the strongest in Central America. After the gunboat Cuba, Patria became the second-largest Cuban vessel. It was designed from the outset as a training ship for the Cuban Navy. In literature, it is typically classified as a gunboat, though some sources incorrectly listed it as a cruiser.

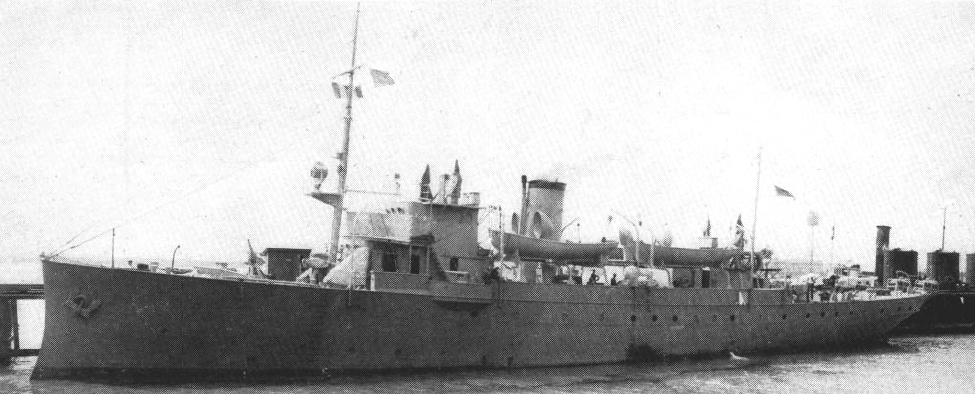
Patria after modernization, 1930s/1940s

The ship was ordered from the William Cramp & Sons Ship & Engine Building Company in Philadelphia. Its design was based on the U.S. Navy's Machias-class gunboats from the 1890s. The ship was ceremonially launched on 10 October 1911, Cuba's independence day, alongside Cuba at the same shipyard. Named Patria (Spanish for "homeland"), it was christened by Narcisa Gómez, daughter of Cuban President José Miguel Gómez. After fitting out, sea trials were scheduled for spring 1912. Construction cost $238,000.

== Design ==
=== Hull and architecture ===
Patria had a flush-deck hull with a ram bow and a sharply overhanging cruiser stern. The hull was constructed of steel. Initially, it featured two thin, slanted funnels and two raked masts. The forward superstructure with the bridge was small, positioned aft of the foremast. Between 1936 and 1937, the ship was modernized, receiving a single wider funnel and an enlarged forward superstructure.

The normal displacement was 1,200 tonnes (1,200 long tons), with a draft of 3.65 m (12 ft 0 in). The length between perpendiculars was 56.4 metres (185 ft 0 in). Some sources report a length of 61 m (200 ft 2 in), possibly referring to overall length. The beam was 10.4 m (34 ft 1 in).

The crew numbered 115, according to some sources. It included accommodations for 20 midshipmen and 10 engine-room cadets.

=== Armament and equipment ===
The original armament comprised two 57 mm (6-pounder) quick-firing guns, four 47 mm (3-pounder) guns, and four 37 mm (1-pounder) guns, all standard American designs. The largest guns were mounted singly on the forecastle and stern, with smaller guns on the deck along the sides, including 47 mm guns on sponsons near the bow and stern for a wide arc of fire, and 37 mm guns amidships. Two 7 mm machine guns, usable by a landing party, supplemented the armament.

In 1917, the ship was modernized in the U.S., with enhanced armament. Details vary: contemporary naval almanacs reported two 76 mm guns during World War I, and by World War II, two 76 mm, four 57 mm, and four 47 mm guns. Other sources suggest that in 1917, the four 37 mm guns were replaced with two additional 57 mm guns (totaling four), and in 1942, three 76 mm guns were added. From 1942, the armament included two 76 mm L/50 (Mk 3/5/6) guns and one 76 mm L/52 dual-purpose gun (Mk 10). Auxiliary armament post-1942 is inconsistent: either four 57 mm and four 47 mm guns, or four 47 mm guns and three machine guns.

During World War II, Patria received U.S. anti-submarine weaponry (depth charge racks, possibly projectors), removed post-war.

The ship was equipped with a radio station, electric lighting, and searchlights from the outset.

=== Propulsion ===
Patria was powered by two triple-expansion steam engines, with cylinder diameters of 33 cm (13 in), 56 cm (22 in), and 91 cm (36 in) and a piston stroke of 61 cm (24 in). Total output was 4,000 horsepower (3,000 kW). Steam was supplied by two coal-fired Mosher water-tube boilers, with a grate area of approximately 9.3 m^{2} (100 sq ft) and a heating surface of about 557 m^{2} (6,000 sq ft). Some sources mention Babcock boilers, possibly installed during modernization. The boilers, housed in a single compartment with a forced-draft blower, enabled a design speed of 16 knots (30 km/h; 18 mph). Coal capacity was 150 tons. Between 1936 and 1937, the propulsion system was upgraded with new fuel oil-fired boilers. Some sources note a reduced speed of 11 knots (20 km/h; 13 mph) during World War II.

== Service ==
In April 1917, Cuba joined World War I on the Allied side, and its navy, alongside the U.S. Navy, patrolled the Caribbean without engaging in combat. In 1917, Patria underwent minor modernization in the U.S., including armament upgrades.

In 1931, Patria was deployed to suppress an attempted uprising against dictator Gerardo Machado. On 17 August, Cuban exiles seized the port and barracks at Gibara, supported by locals. From 18 August, Patria bombarded the barracks, coming under fire from an anti-aircraft battery. By 19 August, government forces recaptured the city. The bombardment by Patria and air attacks killed nine insurgents or civilians, with dozens wounded.

During World War II, Cuba declared war on the Axis powers in December 1941. Patria was overhauled and equipped with depth charges at Galveston, Texas. The Cuban Navy, alongside the U.S. Navy, conducted escort and patrol duties in the Caribbean. Post-war, Patria continued as a training ship. It was decommissioned in 1955.
