= William Cramp & Sons =

American shipping company

Coordinates: 39°58′18″N 75°07′06″W

William Cramp
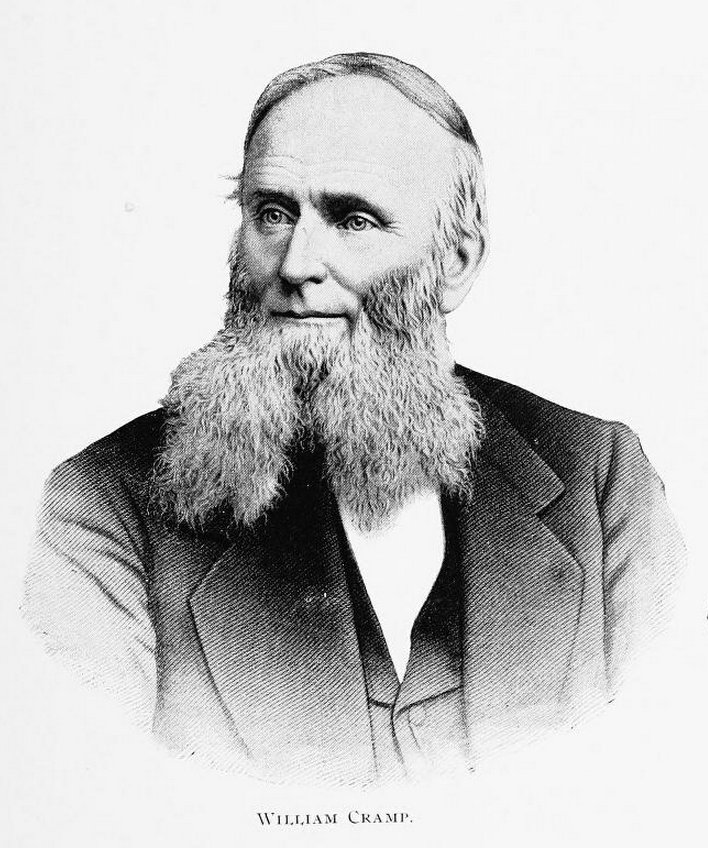
- William Cramp, founder of the firm, c. 1870
- Industry: Shipbuilding
- Founded: 1830
- Founders: William Cramp
- Defunct: 1947
- Headquarters: Philadelphia

William Cramp & Sons Shipbuilding Company (also known as William Cramp & Sons Ship & Engine Building Company) was an American shipbuilding company based in Philadelphia, Pennsylvania, founded in 1830 by William Cramp. During its prime in the late 19th century, it was called the "preeminent American iron shipbuilder".

== Company history ==
=== William Cramp ===
In 1807, William Cramp was born in the Kensington district of Philadelphia. In 1855, his sons Charles Henry Cramp (born 1828) and William Cramp intiated a partnership with their father. In 1872, his other sons, Samuel H., Jacob C., and Theodore, were taken into the firm. The company was incorporated under the name "The William Cramp and Sons' Iron Shipbuilding and Engineering Company."

The pilot boat Thomas Howard was built by the Cramp shipyard in 1870 for the Delaware Bay & River pilots. She was one of the Philadelphia port's fastest pilot boats.

In 1890 the company built the battleships USS Indiana and USS Massachusetts, armored cruiser USS New York, and protected cruiser USS Columbia. Three of these ships took part in the defeat of the Spanish fleet in 1898 at Santiago de Cuba. The victory in this battle heralded America's emergence as a great power. In 1896 Cramps united their artillery arm, the Driggs-Schroeder Ordnance Company, with its main competitor Hotchkiss Gun Company and a projectile manufacturer from Massachusetts into American Ordnance Company. The American Shipping and Commercial Corporation bought the yard in 1919, but closed it in 1927, as fewer ships were ordered by the U.S. Navy after the adoption of the Naval Limitations Treaty in 1923.

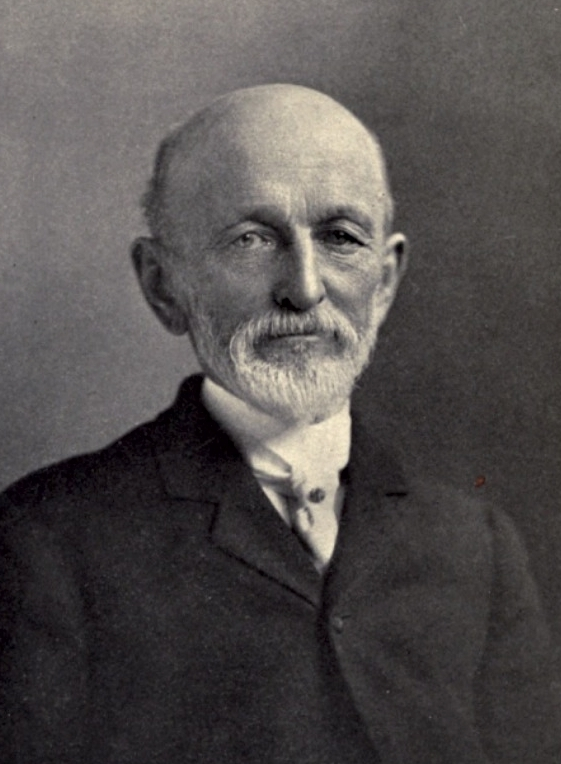
Charles H. Cramp, circa 1900

In 1940, the Navy spent $22 million to reopen the yard as Cramp Shipbuilding to build cruisers and submarines. Cramp used the long slipways to construct two submarines at a time, with the intention of launching them simultaneously. However, the shipyard's submarine construction program was not especially successful, as poor management hindered the delivery of the boats. The first delivery was made two years after keel laying, and fitting out was then done by Portsmouth Navy Yard. The best construction time for a submarine was 644 days.

William Cramp & Sons closed in 1947, and the site, on the Delaware River in Philadelphia's Port Richmond neighborhood, had turned into a residential estate by the early 2020s.

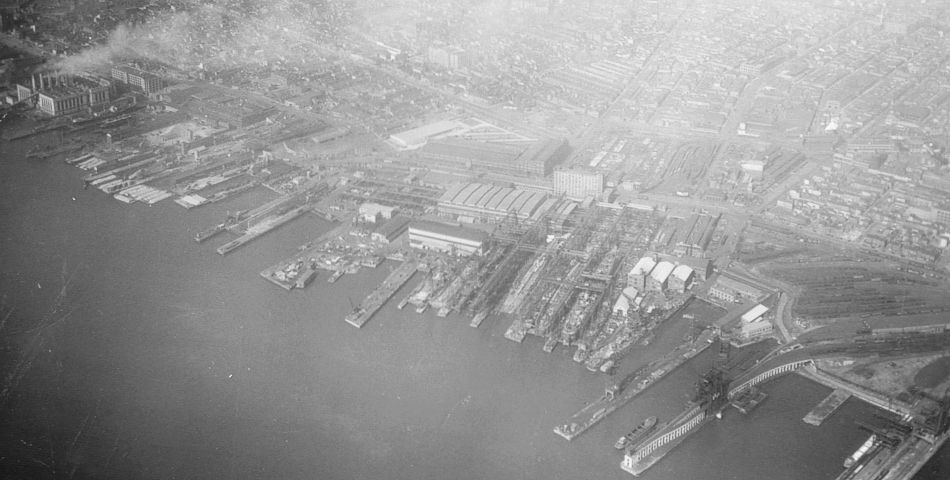
Aerial view of Cramp shipyard

== Notable projects ==
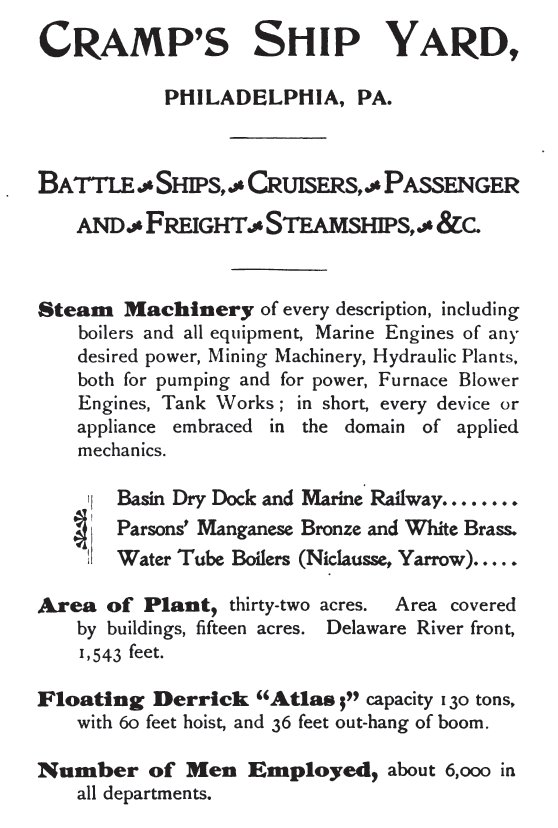
1899 advertisement for William Cramp & Sons

- SY Corsair (1880) built for C J Osborn but sold to J. P. Morgan in 1882 renamed SY Kanapha in 1890 sank in 1898 off the Cuban coast.
- SY Stranger (1880) built for a Mr Osgood, later sold to US Navy
- SS Valencia, a small ocean liner built for the Red D Line in 1882. She was wrecked on the coastline of Vancouver Island, on January 22, 1906, killing around 116 people. Valencia's loss is considered one of the worst shipwrecks in the region known as the Graveyard of the Pacific.
- Atalanta (1883) Atalanta was built for financier Jay Gould in the same year that the American Yacht Club was founded.
- SS Mascotte, launched 23 October 1885 for the Plant Steamship Line.
- SS Philadelphia, a small ocean liner of 2,499 tons built for the Red D Line in 1885
- USS Baltimore (C-3), was launched on 6 October 1888 and played a major role in the Baltimore crisis and took part in the Spanish–American War.
- USS New York, was launched on 2 December 1891 and became flagship of Admiral William T. Sampson's squadron during the Spanish–American War.
- USS Indiana (BB-1), Battleship No. 1 of the United States Navy, launched 28 February 1893.
- SS St. Louis (1894) and SS St. Paul (1895)—the first major ocean liners built in the United States after the collapse of the Collins Line in the 1850s. On 15 November 1899, St. Paul, en route from New York to England with Guglielmo Marconi on board supervising the ship's new wireless telegraph equipment, became the first liner to report her imminent arrival by radio.
- USS Iowa (BB-4), Battleship No. 4 of the US Navy, launched 28 March 1896
- Varyag contracted by Russian Imperial Admiralty, launched October 31, 1899. The cruiser was sunk by the crew in Russo-Japanese War, salvaged by the Japanese and then reclaimed by the Russians.
- USS South Carolina (BB-26), America's first all-big gun battleship (or "dreadnought"), was laid down in 1906, launched on 11 July 1908, and completed in 1910.
- Patria, gunboat and training ship built for the Cuban Revolutionary Navy in 1911. It served during both world wars and was decommissioned in 1955.
- SS Malolo, an American ocean liner and cruise ship built in 1927 for the Matson Line in its Pacific/Hawaiian services and the largest passenger ship built in the United States up to that time at 17,226 registered tones (only the German-built SS Leviathan of the United States Lines was larger in the 1920s). The Matson ship was scrapped in 1977 in Greece after being sold in the meantime.
- SS Evangeline, a coastal passenger liner built in 1927 for the Eastern Steamship Company. While operating as the cruise ship Yarmouth Castle in 1965, she caught fire, killing 87 people.
- On 6 September 1941, the keel for the Cleveland-class light cruiser designated CL-90 was laid down by the Cramp Shipbuilding Company.
- On 8 December 1942, the keel to the Cleveland-class light cruiser designated CL-91, was laid down by the Cramp Shipbuilding Company. On 22 April 1943, Oklahomans were outraged, having just learned that the Japanese had executed the captured American pilots from Jimmy Doolittle's bombing raid over Tokyo. That same day, booths were set up in Oklahoma City with a goal to sell $40 million in War Bonds to fund the construction of a cruiser. That goal was topped by $5 million when the booths closed that night. CL-91 then became the USS Oklahoma City.
- On 6 March 1943, USS Astoria (CL-90) was launched.
- The last ship Cramp and Sons built was the cruiser USS Galveston (CLG-3), launched on April 22, 1945.

Vessels built by the firm that are listed on the U.S. National Register of Historic Places include:

- SS Aleutian, Shipwreck, Amook Island, Larsen Bay, Alaska, NRHP-listed in Kodiak Island Borough, Alaska
- USS Ling (SS-297), Hackensack River at 150 River St., Hackensack, New Jersey
- USS Lionfish (SS-298), National Historic Landmark, Battleship Cove, Fall River, Massachusetts
- USS Massachusetts (BB-2), Shipwreck 1. mi. SSW of Pensacola Pass, Pensacola, Florida

== See also ==
- Philadelphia Naval Shipyard
- Lewis Nixon and Arthur Leopold Busch, naval architects who worked with Cramp & Sons
