= Cuban Revolutionary Navy =

Naval warfare branch of Cuba's military

- Marina de Guerra de la República de Cuba
- The badge of the Cuban Revolutionary Navy
- Founded: 1909; 117 years ago
- Country: Republic of Cuba
- Type: Naval
- Role: Naval warfare
- Size: 3,550 personnel
- Part of: Revolutionary Armed Forces
- Nickname: MGR
- Engagements: Battle of Santiago de Cuba; Sinking of U-176

Insignia
- Naval Jack of Cuba

- Naval Aviation roundel

The Cuban Revolutionary Navy (Spanish: Marina de Guerra Revolucionaria) is the navy of Cuba.

== History ==
The Constitutional Navy of Cuba was the navy of Cuba that existed prior to 1959. During World War II, it sank the German submarine U-176 on 15 May 1943.

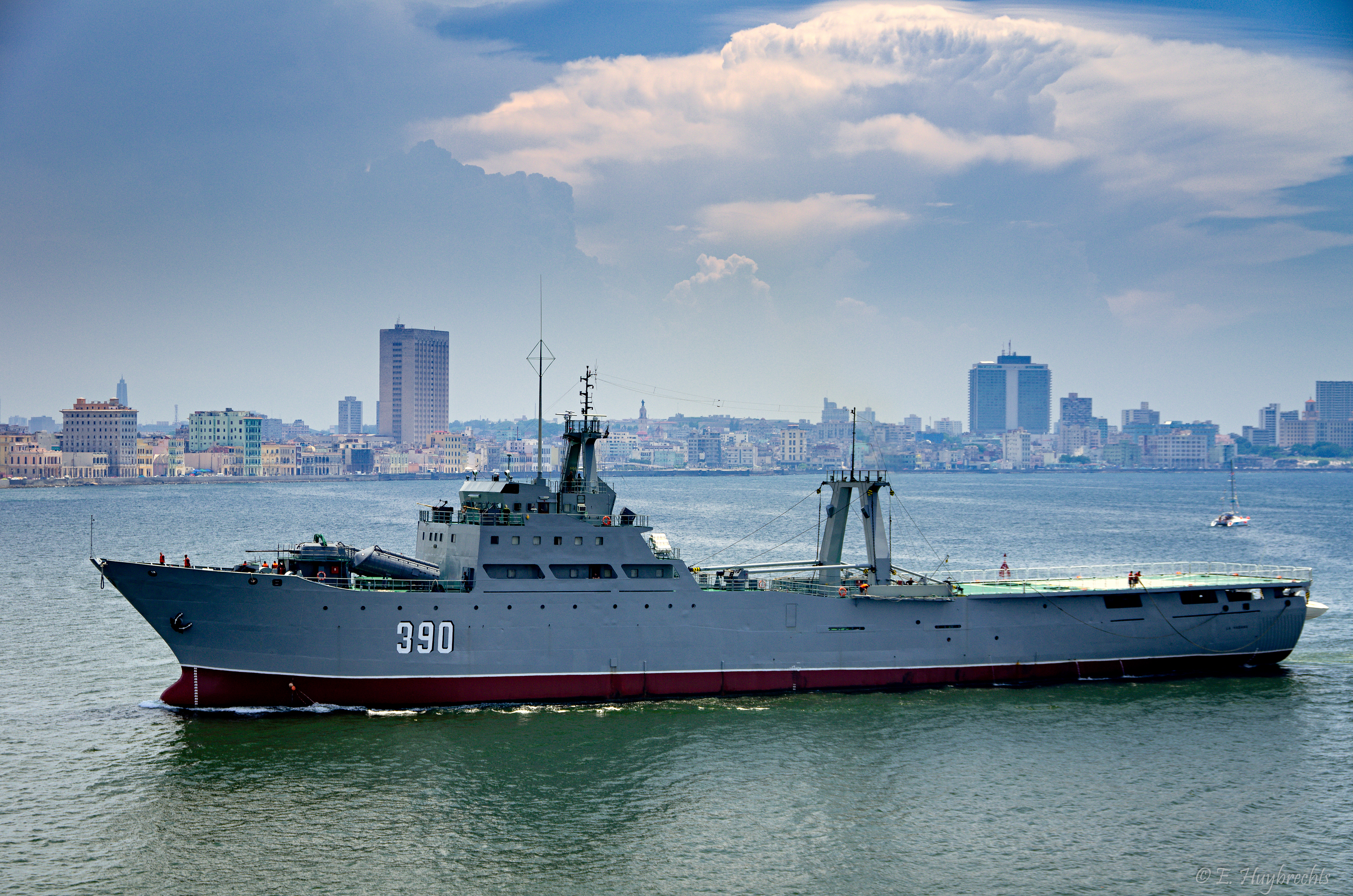
The helicopter carrier patrol vessel Rio Damuji n° 390 in Havana, July 2011

During the Cold War, the Cuban Navy successfully captured the freighters Leyla Express and Johnny Express, both vessels blamed for CIA-related activities against Cuba. In 1988, the Cuban Navy had 12,000 men, three submarines, two modern guided-missile frigates, one intelligence vessel, and a large number of patrol craft and minesweepers.

Most of the Soviet-made vessels have been decommissioned or sunk to make reefs. By 2007, the Cuban Navy was assessed as being 3,000 strong, including up to 550+ Navy Infantry, with six Osa-II and one Pauk-class corvette. The Cuban Navy includes a small marine battalion called the Desembarco de Granma. It once numbered 550 men though its present size is not known.

== Cuban Navy today ==
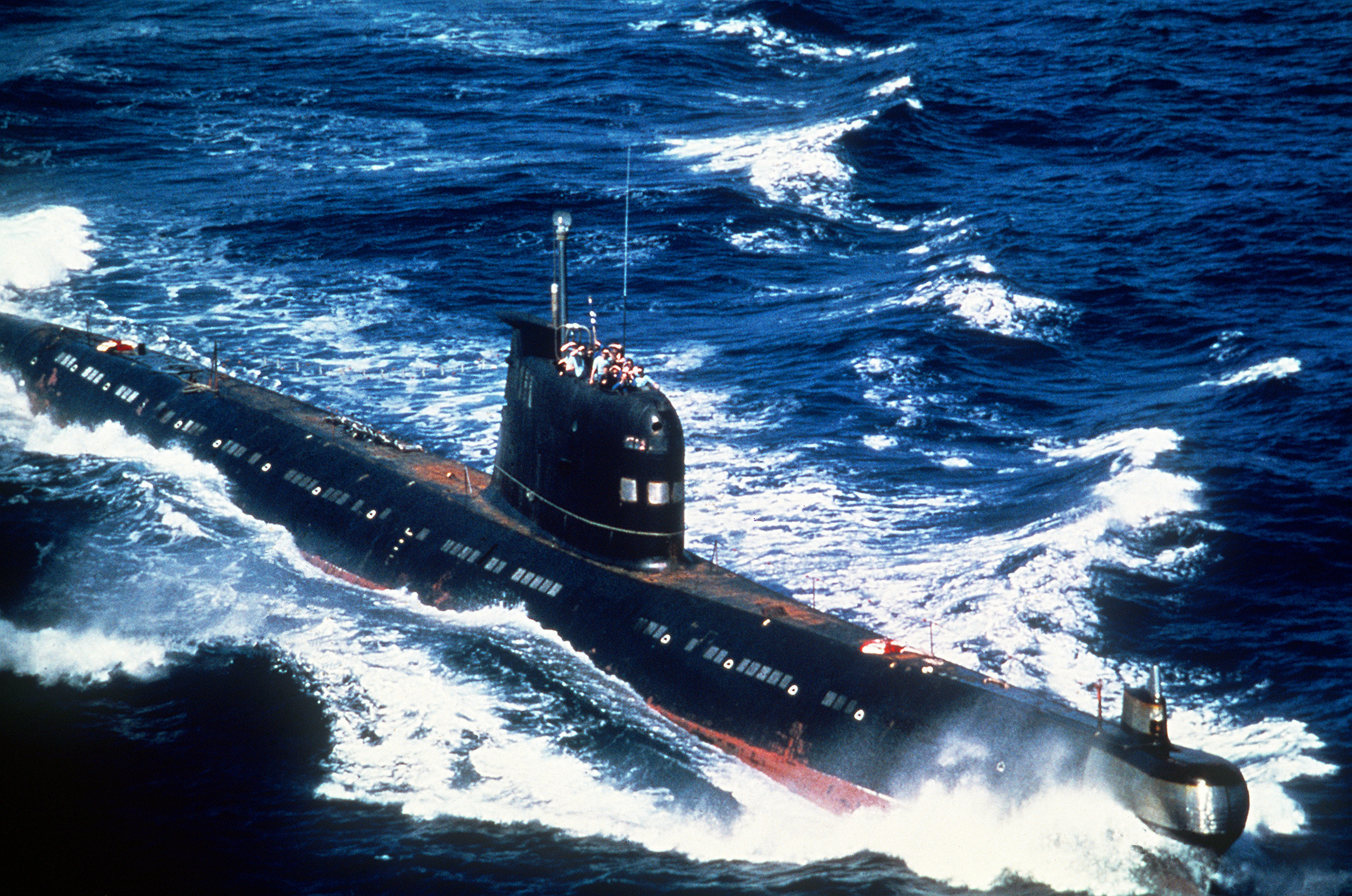
A Cuban Foxtrot-class submarine

After the old Soviet submarines were put out of service, Cuba searched for help from North Korea's experience in midget submarines. North Korean defectors claimed to have seen Cubans in the mid to late 1990s in a secret submarine base. Years later, a single picture of a small black native submarine was seen in Havana harbour. It is rumored to be called 'Delfin' and armed with two torpedoes. Only a single boat is in service and the design appears original, with influence from North Korean and Soviet designs.

The Cuban Navy rebuilt one, large ex-Spanish Rio Damuji fishing boat. BP-390 is now armed with two C-201W missiles, one twin 57 mm gun mount, two twin 25 mm gun mounts and one 14.5 mm machine gun. This vessel is larger than the Koni class, and it is used as a helicopter carrier patrol vessel. A second unit (BP-391) was converted and entered service in 2016.

The Cuban Navy today operates its own missile systems, the made-in-Cuba Bandera (a copy of the dated Styx Soviet missiles) and Remulgadas anti-ship missile systems, and the nationally produced Frontera self-propelled coastal defence multiple rocket launcher. The navy's principal threats are drug smuggling and illegal immigration. Cuba's geographical position and limited naval presence has enabled traffickers to utilise Cuban territorial waters and airspace.

The Cuban Navy's air wing is an ASW helicopter operator only and is equipped with 2 MI-14 Haze helicopters.

== Fleet ==
=== Historic ===
- 1 Soviet Foxtrot-class submarine with 533 mm and 406 mm torpedo tube (non-operational); 3 transferred
- 3 Soviet Koni-class corvettes with 2 Anti-Submarine Weapon Rocket Launcher (non-operational); 3 transferred
- 4 Soviet Osa I/II-class missile boats with 4 SS-N-2 Styx surface-to-surface missile+
- 1 Soviet Pauk II-class fast patrol corvettes, coastal with 2 anti-submarine weapon rocket launcher, 4 anti-submarine torpedo tube
- 1 Soviet/Polish Polnocny-class medium landing ship, capacity 180 troops, 6 tanks (non-operational)
- 1 American gunboat and training ship, Patria, built in 1911, served during both world wars and was decommissioned in 1955

== Military ranks ==
=== Commissioned officer ranks ===
The rank insignia of commissioned officers.

Rank group	General / flag officers			Senior officers				Junior officers
Cuban Revolutionary Navy
Cuban Revolutionary Navy	Almirante	Vicealmirante	Contralmirante	Capitán de flotilla	Capitán de navío	Capitán de fragata	Capitán de corbeta	Teniente de navío	Teniente de fragata	Teniente de corbeta	Alférez

=== Other ranks ===
The rank insignia of non-commissioned officers and enlisted personnel.

Rank group	Senior NCOs							Junior NCOs	Enlisted
Cuban Revolutionary Navy									No insignia	No insignia
Cuban Revolutionary Navy	Suboficial mayor	Primer suboficial	Segundo suboficial	Suboficial	Sargento primero	Sargento de segunda	Sargento de tercera	Cabo	Marinero de primera	Marinero
