= Thomas Howard (pilot boat) =

Delaware Pilot boat

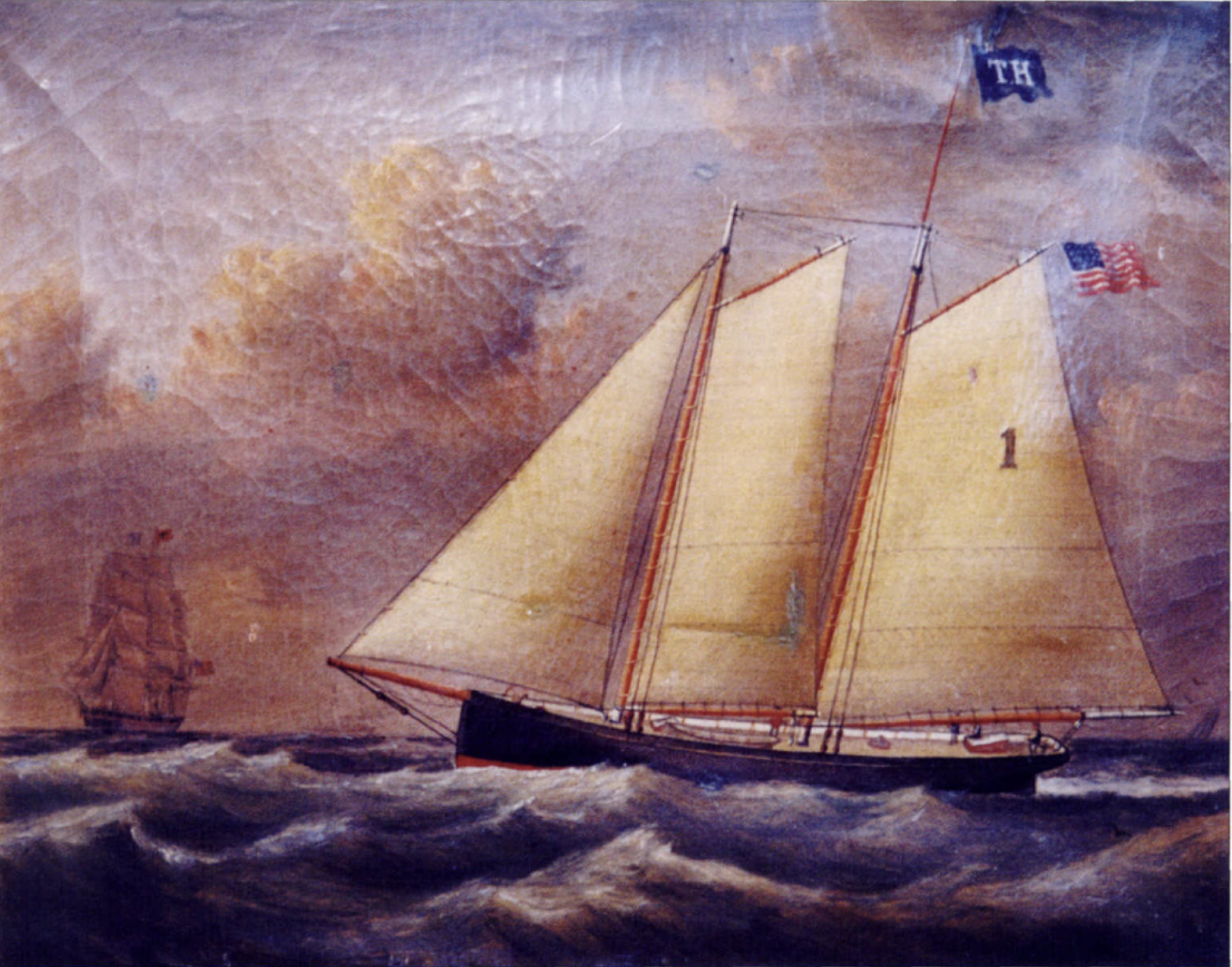
- Pilot Boat Thomas Howard, No. 1.

History

United States
- Name: Thomas Howard
- Owner: Philadelphia and Delaware Pilots
- Operator: James A. Orton, Marshall Bertrand, Jacob Teal
- Builder: William Cramp & Sons
- Launched: 1870
- Out of service: May 10, 1897
- Fate: Sold

General characteristics
- Class & type: schooner
- Tonnage: 51-tons TM
- Length: 79 ft 2 in (24.13 m)
- Beam: 20 ft 6 in (6.25 m)
- Depth: 7 ft 6 in (2.29 m)
- Propulsion: Sail

The Thomas Howard was a 19th-century pilot boat built by William Cramp & Sons in 1870 for the Philadelphia Pilots' Association. She was the finest and fastest pilot-boat belonging to the Philadelphia port. In 1886, the Pilots' Association for the State of Delaware declared that the Thomas Howard become a Delaware pilot boat.

== Construction and service ==
The Thomas Howard was a pilot schooner built in 1870, at the William Cramp & Sons shipyard in Philadelphia for the Pilots' Association She was made from the builder's half-model and plans that show a pilot schooner with a straight keel. The Thomas Howard had a long career in the pilot boat service.

Pilot James A. Orton, in 1880, kept a journal of the daily life aboard the Thomas Howard. On November 21, 1880, the Thomas Howard gave chase to a steamer but lost her to the rival pilot boat Thomas F. Bayard.

The Thomas Howard was registered as a pilot schooner with the Record of American and Foreign Shipping from 1881 to 1907. Her ship owners were Philadelphia Pilots; built in 1870 at Philadelphia, Pennsylvania; and her hailing port was the Port of Philadelphia. Her dimensions were 79.2 ft. in length; 20.6 ft. breadth of beam; 7.6 ft. depth of hold; and 51-tons Tonnage. The sail number "1" was painted in black on her mainsail to distinguish her from other pilot-boats.

There was competition and rivalry between Delaware and Pennsylvania pilots. On June 22, 1886, the Pilot Commissioners of the State of Delaware declared that the Thomas Howard become a Delaware pilot boat, which before worked under the Pennsylvania laws and under the immediate authority of the Philadelphia Board of Port Wardens. Sixteen Pennsylvania pilots gave up their licenses and took out licenses as Delaware pilots in order that they might receive the benefits of the Delaware laws, which had higher rates. The Delaware pilots had the pilot boats Thomas Howard, Henry C. Cope and Thomas F. Bayard. The Howard became known as Delaware Pilot Boat, No. 3.

On July 13, 1890, the Delaware pilot boat Thomas Howard towed into the Delaware Breakwater the British steamer Andes, which was found floating about the ocean having lost her propeller, which left her helpless.

== End of service ==
On May 10, 1897, the Thomas Howard was sold for $1,400 to Fritz & Martin and was converted into a fishing boat.

== See also ==
- Delaware Pilot boats
