= Jock Willis Shipping Line =

Defunct British shipping company

John Willis & Sons
- House flag
- Company type: Private company
- Industry: Shipping
- Founded: 1830
- Founder: John Willis, Senior
- Defunct: 1899
- Headquarters: London, Great Britain
- Key people: John Willis, Senior; John Willis, Junior
- Products: tea, wool

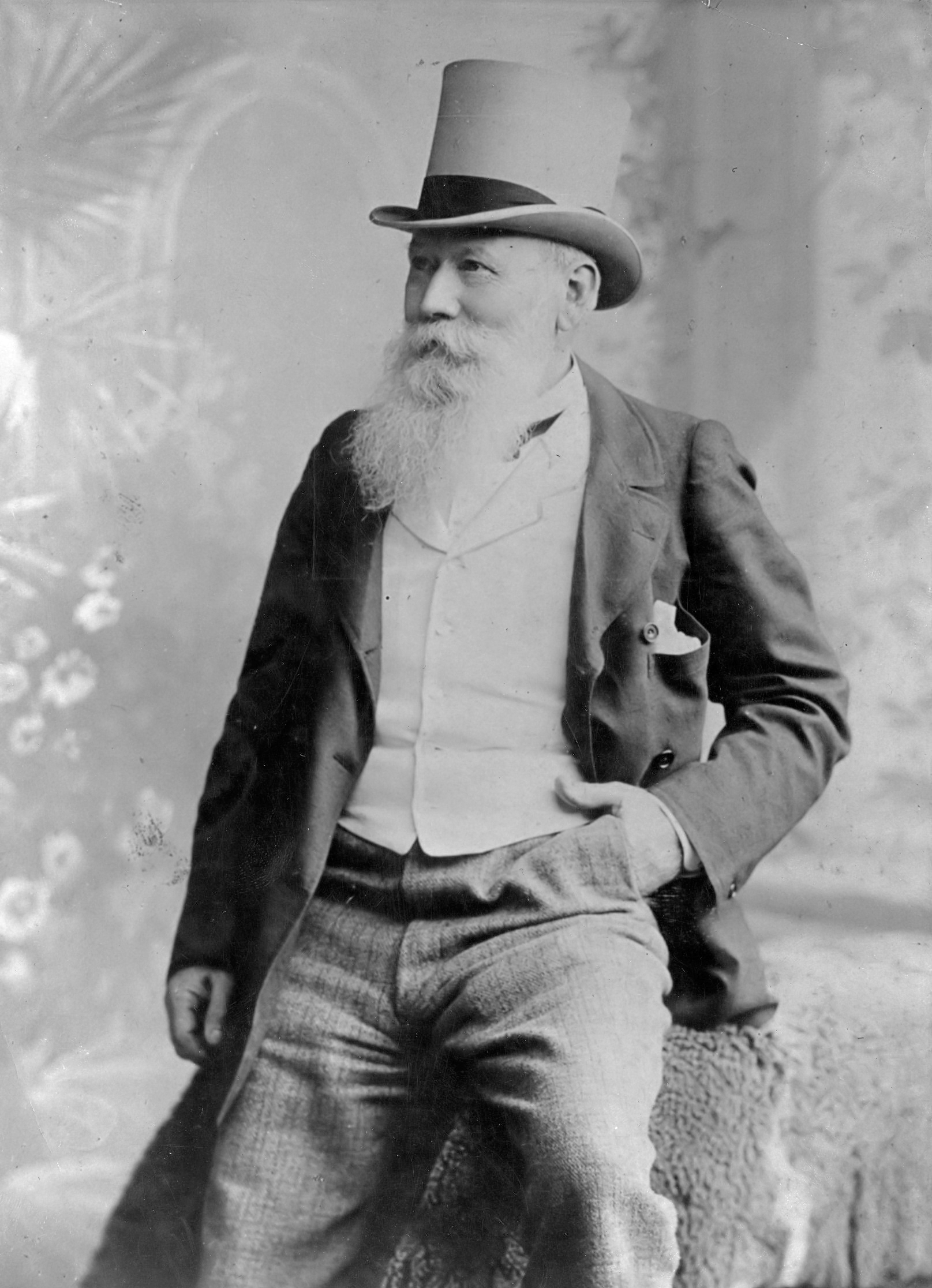
John 'White Hat' Willis

John Willis & Sons of London, also called the Jock Willis Shipping Line, was a nineteenth-century London-based ship-owning firm. It owned a number of clippers including the historic tea clipper Cutty Sark.

== Company history and its people ==
The company was founded in London by John 'Jock' Willis (1791–1862), a ship captain (nicknamed 'Old Stormy Willis'). Jock Willis had joined ships sailing along the British coast after having run away from his home at Eyemouth, Berwickshire, when he was 14 years old. During one of his sailing voyages to London, he found employment at a pub frequented by seafarers in the New India Dock (now Canary Wharf). He saved the money earned there, supplemented by money earned by repairing seafarers' sea shanty musical instruments. He returned to sail on the West Indiamen as a second and Chief Mate.

Willis married Janet Dunbar on 23 July 1815, and the couple had nine children – six sons and three daughters – of whom the eldest was also named John. In 1826, he started his own ship owning company, registered in London.

The younger Jock Willis (1817–1899), himself a ship master, took over his father's firm of ship owners. Also known as 'White Hat Willis', it was during his time that the company built and owned clippers like Cutty Sark. The other sons, too, joined the company in various capacities – either sailing on their ships or working in their offices.

== Trade ==
Their ships focused on the tea trade between China, the far east and United Kingdom and the wool trade with Australia.

== Ships ==
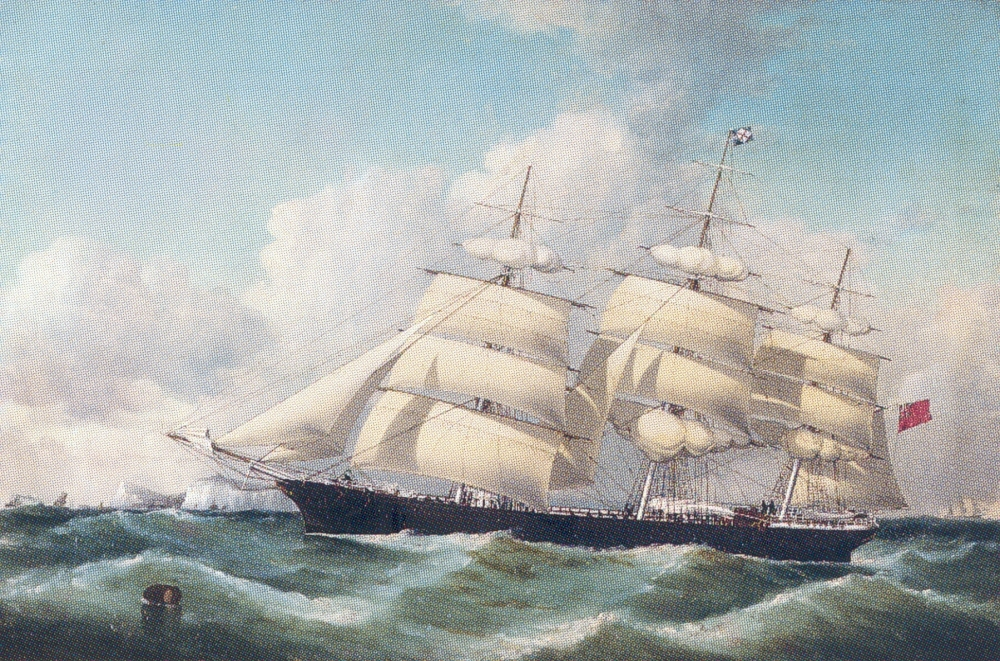
A Willis Tea Line Clipper, by Frederick Tudgay

The first vessel purchased by John Willis was the 253-ton Sunderland-built barque Demarara Planter in 1830, which sailed to the West Indies. Many of the ships later built by the firm were named after places in Willis' native county of Berwickshire. Company ships included:

- Demerara Planter (1830)
- Janet Willis (1835)
- John Willis (1839)
- Whampoa (1842)
- Borderer (1845)
- Saint Abbs (1848)
- Janet Willis (1850)
- Merse (1853)
- Berwickshire (1855)
- Lammermuir (1856)
- Lauderdale (1858)
- Laurel (1861)
- Albuera (1862)
- Whiteadder (1862)
- The Tweed (acquired 1863; launched 1854 as the Punjaub)
- Lammermuir (1864)
- Zenobia (1867)
- Borderer (1868)
- Dharwar (1868)
- Coldinghame (1869)
- Cutty Sark (1869)
- Blackadder (1870)
- Hallowe'en (1872)
- Coldstream (1875)
- Jumna (1875)
- Fantasie (1877)
- Sumatra (1878)
- Taitsing (1880)

== Motto ==
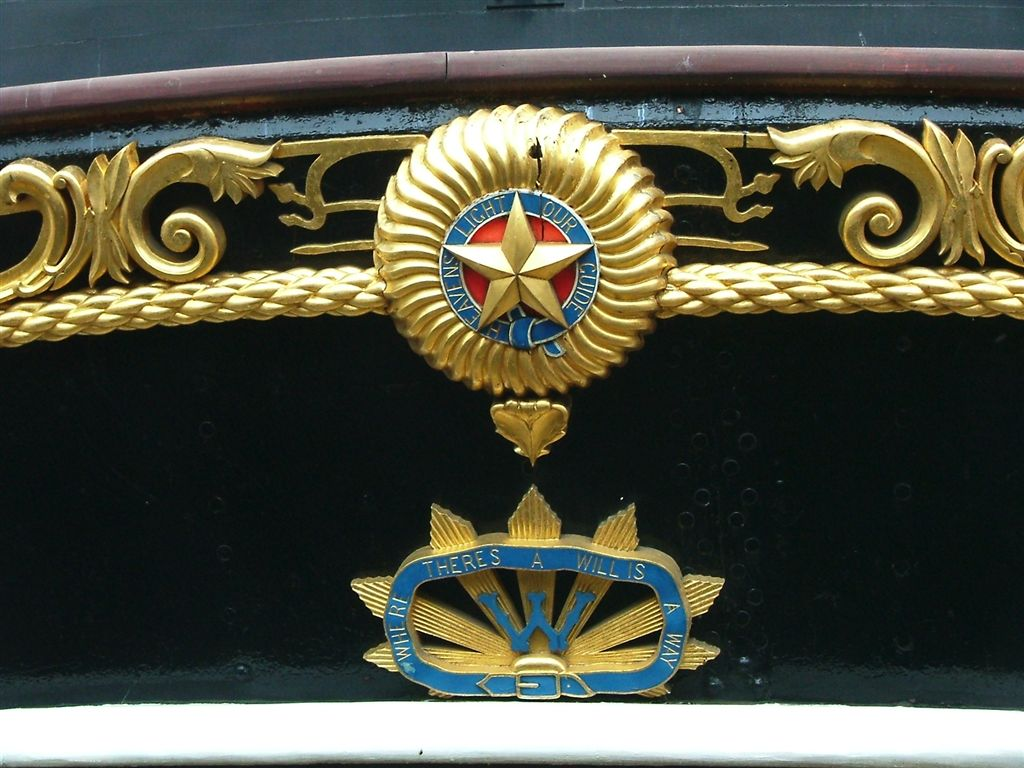
The stern of Cutty Sark, showing the Willis logo

The company's motto, 'Where there's a will is a way', was a pun on the family name, and was displayed on the stern of all Willis ships.

== 1899 – the end ==
The company was dissolved in 1899.
