= Blackadder (clipper) =

1870 clipper ship

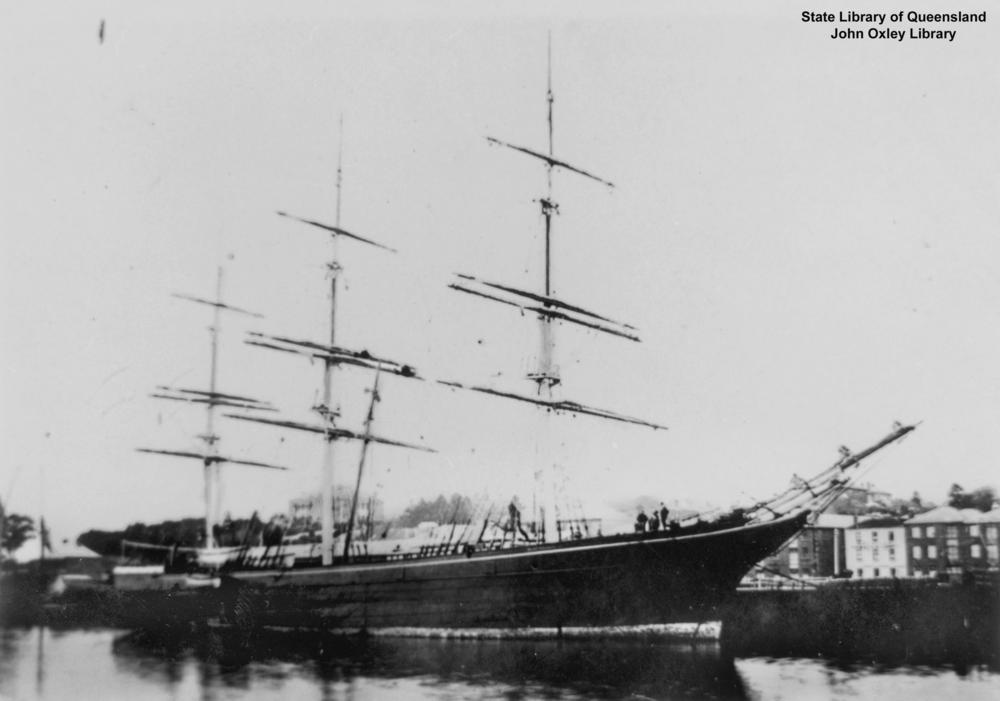
- Blackadder

History

United Kingdom
- Name: Blackadder
- Owner: Jock Willis & Sons
- Builder: Maudslay, Sons & Field; Greenwich
- Launched: 1 February 1870

History

Norway
- Owner: J.Aalborg
- Port of registry: Kragerø
- Acquired: 1900
- Fate: Wrecked 5 November 1905

General characteristics
- Type: Iron-hulled clipper
- Tonnage: 908 NRT(1870); 970 GRT(1883); 917 NRT(1883)
- Length: 216.6 ft (66.0 m)
- Beam: 35.2 ft (10.7 m)
- Depth: 20.5 ft (6.2 m)
- Sail plan: Full-rigged ship, re-rigged as barque

Blackadder was a clipper, a sister ship to Hallowe'en, built in 1870 by Maudslay, Sons & Field at Greenwich for Jock Willis & Sons.

Blackadder was dismasted on her maiden voyage due to failures in the mast fittings and rigging. She "was able to reach the Cape under jury rig 63 days out." John Willis took legal action against the builders which dragged on to such an extent that her sister ship, Hallowe'en, was not handed over to Willis until nearly 18 months after her launch. After John Willis died in 1900, Blackadder was bought by J. Aalborg of Kragerø in Norway. On 5 November 1905 she was wrecked whilst on passage from Barry to Bahia loaded with coal.

== History ==
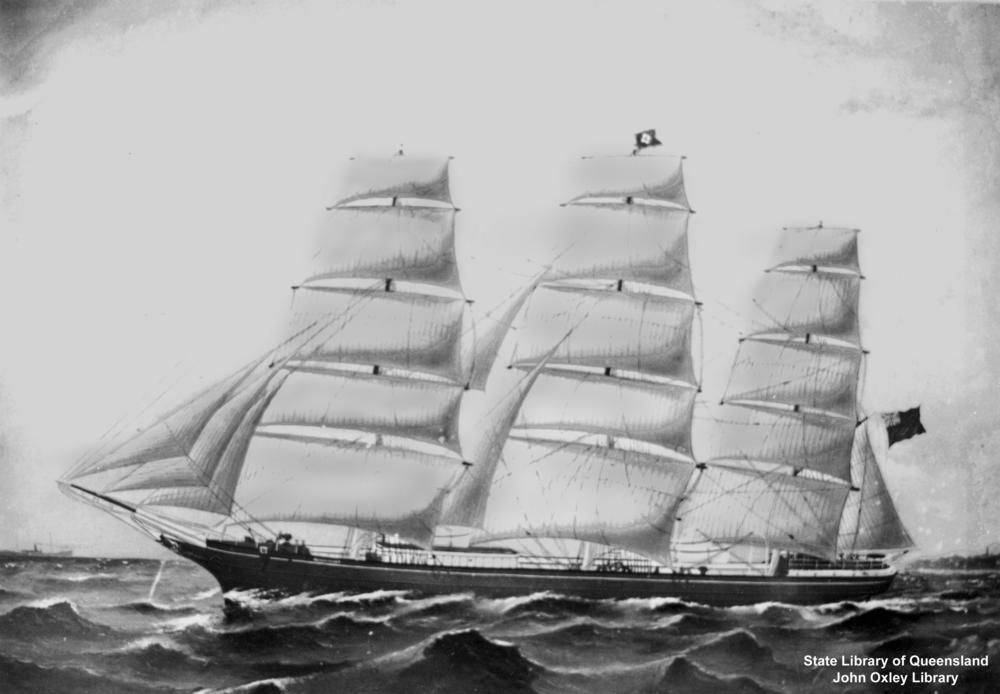
Image of the Blackadder as a full-rigged ship (John Oxley Library, State Library of Queensland

Jock Willis & Sons operated a shipping line which specialised in fast sailing cargo ships, including tea clippers trading tea from China. These were 'state of the art' ships designed to take part in what had become a race to be the fastest ship home with the new season tea. The opening of the Suez Canal in 1869 together with steady improvements in steam engineering meant that sailing ships were slowly being replaced by steam ships, which could operate on guaranteed timetables and make use of the shorter route through the canal, which was unsuitable for sailing ships. However, steamers had the disadvantage of having to purchase coal for the journey and to carry coal, reducing the space available for cargo. A number of ship owners therefore still believed there was a place for good sailing ships, and these continued in profitable service for many years.

In 1869 Jock Willis, junior (son of Jock Willis, senior, founder of the company) had commissioned another clipper, Cutty Sark, which was a composite design (timber hull on iron frame). He now commissioned two further ships, but this time with iron hulls. As was the case with Cutty Sark, the shape of the hull for the ships was based upon another ship belonging to Willis, The Tweed (previously named Punjaub). This was a former sail/paddle steamer frigate built in Bombay for the East India Company, later sold when the East India company navy was merged into the Royal Navy. Willis removed the engines and paddle wheels and found he had an exceptionally good sailing ship. Messrs. Ritherdon and Thompson, the surveyors to the East India Council, were commissioned to prepare drawings for the new ships based upon The Tweed. Although similar below the water and of very similar size, the two ships looked somewhat different from Cutty Sark.

Maudsley and Co. were contracted to construct the ship, although they were an engineering company relatively inexperienced with whole ship design. This was not dissimilar to Willis' choice in builders for Cutty Sark which was also a new and inexperienced company, which in that instance became bankrupt before Cutty Sark was completed. The contract was signed in June 1869 and the ship launched March 1870, to the highest Lloyds standards and using the best materials.

=== Maiden voyage ===
Cargo was starting to be loaded on board the ship even before installation of the masts had been completed. Masts on such a ship are sectional and are installed in overlapping pieces with stays (lines) running up from the deck to fixing points on each section to hold the masts steady. It was noticed that the stays were slack, so they were re-tightened, only for them to be found slack again the following day. On further examination it was discovered that the metal cradles which supported the topmasts had been incorrectly manufactured, and had simply bent out of shape once tension had been applied on the stays. Rather than remove the masts to repair the damage, additional strengthening was added to hold together the cradles and provide new fixing points. However, the bent ironwork could not be repaired with the masts in place. The ship sailed for China.

During the journey it became clear that repairs had been inadequate. Chains were added to the mainmast to help support its topmast, and it was noticed that rivets holding the collar around the mainmast were becoming loose. The ship's carpenter proposed drilling through the mast and inserting a winch handle to ensure the collar stayed in place, but the captain refused. Only the skysail yards were taken down to reduce loading on the masts.

At about midnight, with the wind slackening and changing direction and approaching the Roaring Forties, the captain decided to trim the ship and ordered a change in helm. Despite care by the helmsman to carry out the turn as slowly as possible so as to minimise the stress on the masts as the pressure from the winds changed, the inevitable rolling of the ship as it ceased to be pushed along while turning caused the collar to break away and the lower rigging with it. The continuing rolling meant the masts leaned one way and then the other, each time becoming looser. The iron mainmast buckled below the level of the deck, tearing the deck as it did, ending leaning to port at 45 degrees. Shortly the remaining supports gave way and with an extra large roll, the mast tore further through the deck and fell overboard.

Braces to the mizzen mast from the main had been torn away, and it too started to rock loose. Despite attempts to get a line on it, while also trying to clear lines still attached to the sinking mainmast, this mast too fell, this time backwards across the stern of the ship, just missing the wheel. Crew worked to get the mizzen free and overboard, as it rolled dangerously about on the deck. The sole remaining mast was now unsupported because its braces from the mainmast had also gone, but in this case, the crew managed to get lines tightened to hold it in place. Both fore topsail yards had been snapped as the falling main mast pulled on them, and the other yards were pulled out of place.

The following morning two men went aloft on the still swaying foremast to try to clear the broken rigging and yards. The royal yard came loose and fell, bringing with it part of the fore topgallant mast. Over the next three days the crew managed to salvage enough yards to have three sails on the foremast plus stunsails and set course for Simon's Bay. Another ship, the St. Mungo saw the state of Blackadder and tried to come to assist, but was unable to catch up. Approaching False Bay to anchor, the ship fouled a wreck and before repairs were completed was in collision with two other vessels. Replacement masts and yards were sent out from Britain and the ship eventually proceeded to Shanghai. On the way she collided with a French mail steamer, and after further repairs lost her jibboon in yet another collision at Penang. She returned to London, arriving 17 November 1871 without further notable incident. The ship's insurers refused to pay out on claims for the damage, on the grounds the ship had been unseaworthy when it set out, and eighteen months of litigation against the builders ensued.

=== Calmer sailing ===
The ship's captain was dismissed and replaced with Captain Moore. The following season's journey to China was relatively uneventful, only involving the loss of the mizzen topgallant mast in a collision. Moore was moved to command Cutty Sark and replaced with Sam Bissett, who had been mate on the maiden voyage. Carrying coal from Sydney to Shanghai she was caught in a typhoon, which caused the ship to heel over so much that the main and mizzen masts had to be cut away once more to right her. The cargo had shifted and had to be moved before the ship could be properly righted, but she limped on to Shanghai where new masts were fitted and she proceeded to Iloio and loaded a cargo for Boston. In the China sea the ship hit an uncharted reef and stuck fast, despite throwing the cargo overboard. The ship was abandoned and the crew taken off by Albyn's isle, which had come to their assistance. A squall sprang up, which now blew the ship clear of the reef and after a chase of some hours, the crew managed to reboard the ship and take control of their vessel again. A slow journey to Boston followed. For the fourth season she was commanded by Captain White.
