= Hallowe'en (clipper) =

Coordinates: 50.2377°N 3.7642°W

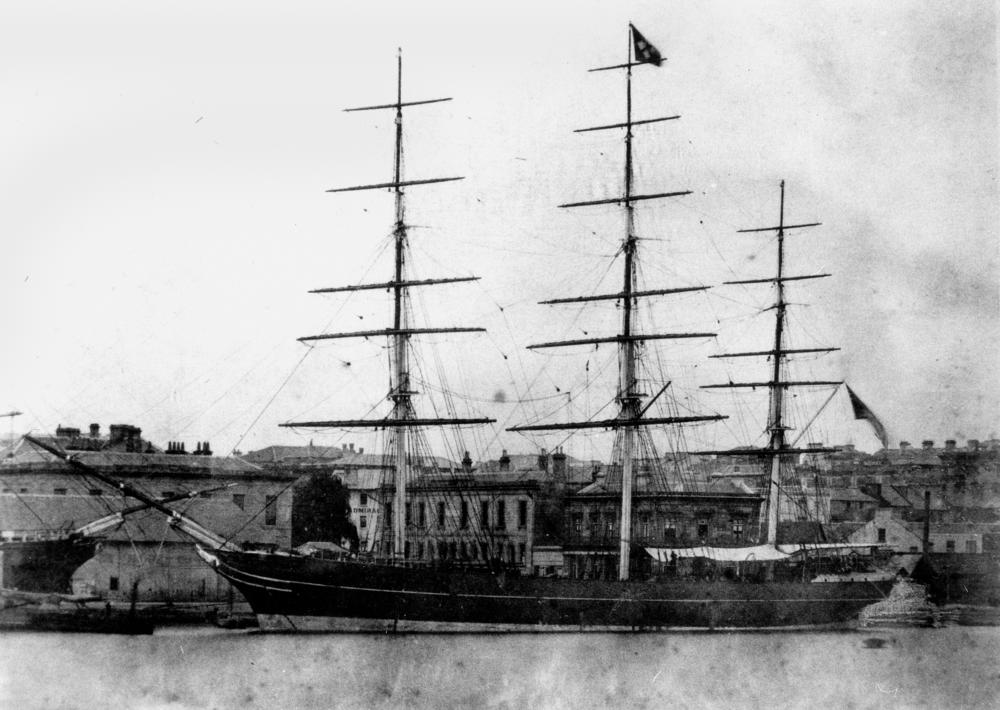
- Hallowe'en

History

United Kingdom
- Owner: Jock Willis & Sons
- Builder: Maudslay, Son & Field, Greenwich, England
- Launched: 4 June 1870
- Fate: Wrecked 17 January 1887

General characteristics
- Class & type: Iron clipper ship
- Tons burthen: 970,99 GRT
- Length: 216 ft 6 in (65.99 m)
- Beam: 35 ft 2 in (10.72 m)
- Draught: 20 ft 5 in (6.22 m)
- Sail plan: Full-rigged ship

Hallowe’en was a 920-ton iron clipper ship. She was built in 1870 by Maudslay, Son & Field at Greenwich, England, for Jock Willis & Sons (commissioned by John Willis, junior), and was a sister ship to the clipper ship Blackadder.

Due to faults in Blackadder, which caused dismasting on her maiden voyage, Hallowe’en was not handed over to Willis for nearly 18 months after her launch due to protracted legal action.

== Record passage from China to London ==
In 1874–1875, Hallowe’en sailed from Shanghai China, to London with a cargo of tea in 91 days, a record time, arriving 20 January 1875. She was fast in light airs and recorded many fast passages between China and the United Kingdom.

On 17 January 1887, Hallowe’en was on passage from Fuzhou, China, loaded with tea when she was wrecked in the English Channel at Soar Mill Cove off Salcombe, South Devon, England.
