= List of ship launches in 1889 =

The list of ship launches in 1889 includes a chronological list of some ships launched in 1889.

| Date | Ship | Class / type | Builder | Location | Country | Notes |
|---|---|---|---|---|---|---|
| 1 January | Racer | Schooner | James Anderson | Kingston on Spey | United Kingdom | For Smith & Coull. |
| 1 January | Runic | Cargo liner | Harland & Wolff | Belfast | United Kingdom | For White Star Line |
| 1 January | Topic | Steamship | MacIlwain & MacColl (Limited) | Belfast | United Kingdom | For W. A. Grainger. |
| 1 January | Unnamed | Torpedo boat | Head and Barnard | Hull | United Kingdom | For Hull Submarine Mining Volunteer Corps. |
| 2 January | George Clarkson | Steamship | T. Turnbull & Son | Whitby | United Kingdom | For Henry Baxter & Co. |
| 3 January | Peace | Steamship | Blyth Shipbuilding Co. Ltd | Blyth | United Kingdom | For Clapham Steamship Co. Ltd. |
| 5 January | Clunie | Steamship | John Duthie, Sons & Co. | Aberdeen | United Kingdom | For W. T. Moffatt. |
| 15 January | Carr Rock | Barque | Alexander Stephen & Sons | Linthouse | United Kingdom | For James Cornfoot & Co. |
| 15 January | Otter | Dredger | William Simons & Co. | Renfrew | United Kingdom | For Natal Harbour Board. |
| 17 January | Dean | Steamship | Gourlay Bros. | Dundee | United Kingdom | For George Armistead & Co. |
| 18 January | Scottish Maid | Steam trawler | John Scott & Co. | Kinghorn | United Kingdom | For Robert Brown & Co. |
| 19 January | Ataka | Steamship | Ropner & Son | Stockton-on-Tees | United Kingdom | For private owner. |
| 19 January | Lewis Morrice | Lifeboat | | Dover | United Kingdom | For Royal National Lifeboat Institution. |
| 19 January | Teutonic | Teutonic-class ocean liner | Harland & Wolff | Belfast | United Kingdom | For White Star Line |
| 21 January | Orient | Merchantman | Charles Connell & Co. | Scotstoun | United Kingdom | For private owner. |
| 23 January | München | Steamship | Fairfield Shipbuilding and Engineering Co. | Govan | United Kingdom | For Norddeutsche Lloyd. |
| 26 January | Arrow | Steamship | W. B. Thompson & Co. Ltd | Dundee | United Kingdom | For Shropshire Union Railways and Canal Company. |
| 26 January | Phosphor | Tanker | Sir William Armstrong, Mitchell & Co. | Low Walker-on-Tyne | United Kingdom | For R. Stewart & Co. |
| 29 January | Bombay | Steamship | Caird & Co. | Greenock | United Kingdom | For Peninsular and Oriental Steam Navigation Company. |
| 29 January | Eden Vale | Steamship | S. M'Knight & Co. | Ayr | United Kingdom | For executors of the late John Bacon. |
| 29 January | Lord Stanley | Tug | David & William Henderson & Co. | Partick | United Kingdom | For G. T. Davie. |
| 29 January | Petunia | Steamship | Blyth Shipbuilding Co. Ltd | Blyth | United Kingdom | For Petunia Steamship Co. Ltd. |
| 31 January | Trewellard | Cargo ship | John Readhead and Sons | South Shields | United Kingdom | For Edward Hain and Son |
| 31 January | Unnamed | Steamship | Stephenson & Co. | Hebburn-upon-Tyne | United Kingdom | For private owner. |
| January | Battambarg | Steamship | | Nantes | France | For Compagnie Messageries Fluviale de Cochin-Chine. |
| January | Dordogne | Steamship | | Havre de Grâce | France | For Compagnie des Messageries Maritimes. |
| January | Frances | Ketch | C. Burt & Sons | Falmouth | United Kingdom | For Charles Kelway. |
| January | Guadiana | Steamship | | Havre de Grâce | France | For Compagnie des Messageries Maritimes. |
| January | Paraguay | Passenger ship | | Saint-Nazaire | France | For Chargeurs Réunis. |
| January | Preston | Steamship | Fleming & Ferguston | Paisley | United Kingdom | For Corporation of Preston. |
| January | Reine Maria Cristina | Steamship | | | Spain | For Compania Transatlantica. |
| January | Setiembre | Steamship | William Doxford & Sons | Sunderland | United Kingdom | For La Compañía Bilbaína de Navegaçión. |
| January | Victoria-Augusta | Steamship | | Stettin | Germany | For Hamburg-Amerikanische Packetfahrt-Actien-Gesellschaft. |
| January | Unnamed | Gig | Messum & Son | Richmond | United Kingdom | For Wilheim I. |
| 2 February | Enterkin | Full-rigged ship | Robert Duncan & Co. | Port Glasgow | United Kingdom | For Village Line. |
| 2 February | J. H. Hustede | Barque | Russell & Co. | Port Glasgow | United Kingdom | For John Huis Hustede. |
| 2 February | Lyonesse | Ferry | Harvey's of Hayle | Hayle | United Kingdom | For the West Cornwall Steam Ship Company as a second ferry between Penzance and the Isles of Scilly. |
| 2 February | Singapore | Steamship | Fleming & Ferguson | Paisley | United Kingdom | For private owner. |
| 2 February | Star of England | Steamship | Workman, Clarke & Co. | Belfast | United Kingdom | For J. P. Corry & Co. |
| 2 February | William C. Mitchell | Merchantman | William Doxford & Sons | Sunderland | United Kingdom | For The Steam Navigation Co. of Ireland Ltd. |
| 2 February | Wild Flower | Tanker | Robert Thompson & Sons | Sunderland | United Kingdom | For A Suart. |
| 18 February | Asiacoe | Steamship | Raylton Dixon & Co. | Middlesbrough | United Kingdom | For Bennetts & Co. |
| 18 February | Hellopes | Steamship | J. Reid & Co. | Port Glasgow | United Kingdom | For R. P. Housten & Co. |
| 18 February | Perro | Steamship | Grangemouth Dockyard Company | Grangemouth | United Kingdom | For Williamson & Jessen. |
| 18 February | Aquila | Steamship | Wigham, Richardson & Co. | Wallsend | United Kingdom | For Fratelli Lavarelli fu Gio Batta. |
| 20 February | Lady Aline | Steam yacht | Russell & Co. | Port Glasgow | United Kingdom | For William B. Walker. |
| 22 February | Larnaca | Steamship | Russell & Co. | Greenock | United Kingdom | For G. M. Steeves. |
| 22 February | Spanker | Sharpshooter-class torpedo gunboat | | Devonport | United Kingdom | For Royal Navy. |
| 27 February | Columbia | Steamship | Laird Bros. | Birkenhead | United Kingdom | For Hamburg-Amerikanische Packetfahrt-Actien-Gesellschaft. |
| 28 February | Beagle | Beagle-class sloop | | Portsmouth | United Kingdom | For Royal Navy. |
| 28 February | British Empire | Cargo ship | Harland & Wolff | Belfast | United Kingdom | For British Shipowners Ltd. |
| February | Clio | Steamship | W. Gray & Co. (Limited) | West Hartlepool | United Kingdom | For T. Wilson, Sons & Co. |
| February | Gutenfels | Steamship | Sunderland Shipbuilding Co. Ltd | Sunderland | United Kingdom | For Deutsche Dampfschiffahrts-Gesellschaft Hansa. |
| February | Hillope | Steamship | John Reid & Co. | Port Glasgow | United Kingdom | For R. P. Houston & Co. |
| February | Pegu | Steamship | William Denny and Brothers | Dumbarton | United Kingdom | For British and Burmese Steam Navigation Company. |
| February | Sir Robert Fernie | Full-rigged ship | Russel & Co. | Kingston | United Kingdom | For W. J. Fernie. |
| 2 March | Brandenburg | Passenger ship | Charles Joseph Bigger | Londonderry | United Kingdom | For Liverpool & Maranham Steamship Co. Ltd. |
| 2 March | Chili | Steamship | Richardson, Duck & Co. | South Stockton | United Kingdom | For Compagnie Maritime du Pacifique. |
| 2 March | Cobra | Paddle steamer | Fairfield Shipbuilding & Engineering Co. | Fairfield | United Kingdom | For Messrs Burns. |
| 2 March | Concord | Steamship | Thomas Turnbull & Sons | Whitby | United Kingdom | For Thomas Smailes & Co. |
| 2 March | Dora | Steamship | Robert Napier & Sons | Govan | United Kingdom | For London and South Western Railway. |
| 2 March | Wastwater | Steamship | Edward Withy & Co. | Hartlepool | United Kingdom | For James Huddard. |
| 3 March | Charente | Steamship | Forges et Chantiers de la Méditerranée | Le Havre | France | ForCie. des Messageries Maritimes |
| 4 March | Sir Stafford Northcote | Thames barge | Forrestt & Son | Wivenhoe | United Kingdom | For the Admiralty. |
| 5 March | A. T. Braga | Steamship | Ailsa Shipbuilding Co. | Troon | United Kingdom | For John B. Cameron & Co. |
| 5 March | Falka | Steamship | W. Gray & Co. (Limited) | West Hartlepool | United Kingdom | For Hersking & Woods. |
| 5 March | Unnamed | Steamship | T. A. Walker | Sudbrook | United Kingdom | For private owner. |
| 6 March | Brunel | Full-rigged ship | Robert Duncan & Co. | Port Glasgow | United Kingdom | For Village Line. |
| 6 March | Lapwing | Redwing-class gunboat | | Devonport | United Kingdom | For Royal Navy. |
| 6 March | Saint Margaret | Steamship | Scott & Co. | Bowling | United Kingdom | For Robert Harper. |
| 7 March | Basilisk | Beagle-class sloop | | Sheerness | United Kingdom | For Royal Navy. |
| 12 March | Yayeyama Kan | Despatch boat | Yokosuka Naval Arsenal | Yokosuka | Japan | For Imperial Japanese Navy. |
| 14 March | Strathclyde | Steamship | Alexander Stephen & Sons | Linthouse | United Kingdom | For Burrell & Son. |
| 15 March | Ariel | Steamship | W. Gray & Co. | West Hartlepool | United Kingdom | For Rickinson, Son & Co. |
| 15 March | Magpie | Redbreast-class gunboat | | Pembroke Dockyard | United Kingdom | For Royal Navy. |
| 15 March | Speedwell | Sharpshooter-class torpedo gunboat | | Devonport Dockyard | United Kingdom | For Royal Navy. |
| 16 March | Alboin | Merchantman | Sunderland Shipbuilding Co. Ltd. | Sunderland | United Kingdom | For Johannes. Lange. |
| 16 March | B. T. Robinson | Steamship | John Blumer & Co. | Sunderland | United Kingdom | For Robinson Brothers Steamship Co. Ltd. |
| 16 March | Foyle | Merchantman | William Doxford & Sons | Sunderland | United Kingdom | For Mercantile Steamship Co. Ltd. |
| 19 March | Benwick | Steamship | Schlesinger, Davis & Co. | Wallsend | United Kingdom | For Joseph Hoult. |
| 19 March | Maltby | Steamship | Ropner & Son | Stockton-on-Tees | United Kingdom | For R. Ropner & Co. |
| 19 March | Unnamed | Steamship | Wigham, Richardson & Co. Ltd. | Newcastle upon Tyne | United Kingdom | For Compagnie Anonyme de Navigation Mixte. |
| 19 March | Unnamed | Steamship | Wood, Skinner & Co. | Newcastle upon Tyne | United Kingdom | For Wilhelm Wilhemsen. |
| 20 March | Ethiope | Steamship | Raylton Dixon & Co. | Stockton-on-Tees | United Kingdom | For Elder, Dempster & Co. |
| 20 March | Oruba | Steamship | Naval Construction and Armaments Co. | Barrow-in-Furness | United Kingdom | For Pacific Steam Navigation Company. |
| 20 March | Thurston | Steamship | W. Gray & Co. (Limited) | West Hartlepool | United Kingdom | For Murrell & Yeoman. |
| 21 March | Dryfesdale | Steamship | Charles Connell & Company. | Scotstoun | United Kingdom | For Robert Mackill & Co. |
| 21 March | Lelande | Troude-class protected cruiser | Forges et Chantiers de la Gironde | Lormont | France | For French Navy. |
| 22 March | Kinloch | Steamship | A. M'Millan & Son | Dumbarton | United Kingdom | For James Gardiner & Co. |
| 27 March | Oceana | Tug | Gourlay Bros. & Co. | Dundee | United Kingdom | For William Watkins. |
| 29 March | Crown | Steamship | Blyth Shipbuilding Co. Ltd | Blyth | United Kingdom | For Crown Steamship Co. Ltd. |
| 29 March | Glencaird | Barque | Russell & Co. | Port Glasgow | United Kingdom | For W. T. Dickson & Sons. |
| 30 March | Inverurie | Barque | Alexander Hall & Co. | Aberdeen | United Kingdom | For George Milne & Co. |
| 30 March | Kopernikus | Steamship | S. & H. Morton | Leith | United Kingdom | For Marcus Cohn & Sohn. |
| 30 March | Sheldrake | Sharpshooter-class torpedo gunboat | | Chatham Dockyard | United Kingdom | For Royal Navy. |
| March | Alexander III | Steamship | Scott & Co. | Greenock | United Kingdom | For Det Forenede Dampskibs-Selskab . |
| March | Auguste Helmerich | Steamship | Koch Henry AG | Lübeck | Germany | For private owner. |
| March | Deaucun | Steamship | Barclay, Curle & Co. | Whiteinch | United Kingdom | For private owner. |
| March | St. Andrew | Sternwheel hopper dredger | William Simons & Co. | Renfrew | United Kingdom | For private owner. |
| March | Suffolk | Steamship | Ramage & Ferguson | Leith | United Kingdom | For private owner. |
| March | Yaeyama | Unprotected cruiser | Yokosuka Naval Arsenal | Yokosuka | Japan | For Imperial Japanese Navy. |
| 1 April | No. 28 | Torpedo boat | Chantiers et Ateliers Augustin Normand | Havre de Grâce | United Kingdom | For French Navy. |
| 2 April | Cayuga | Steamship | Globe Iron Works | Cleveland, Ohio | United States | For Lehigh Valley Transit Company. |
| 2 April | Pladda | Steamship | W. B. Thompson & Co. (Limited) | Dundee | United Kingdom | For Clyde Shipping Company. |
| 2 April | Unnamed | Lifeboat | Beeching | Great Yarmouth | United Kingdom | For Royal National Lifeboat Institution. |
| 3 April | Arndilly | Steamship | W. Dobson & Co. | Newcastle upon Tyne | United Kingdom | For Adam & Co. |
| 3 April | Hippomenes | Steamship | Workman, Clark & Co. Ltd. | Belfast | United Kingdom | For R. P. Houston & Co. |
| 3 April | Mary Ann | Schooner | P. & G. Copland | Stromness | United Kingdom | For Baillie Shearer. |
| 3 April | Norlands | Steamship | W. Gray & Co. (Limited) | West Hartlepool | United Kingdom | For Hardy, Wilson & Co. |
| 3 April | Solent Queen | Paddle steamer | Barclay, Curle & Co. | Whiteinch | United Kingdom | For Southampton, Isle of Wight, and South of England Royal Mail Steamship Co. |
| 3 April | Indramayo | Steamship | London and Glasgow Shipbuilding Company | Govan | United Kingdom | For Macvicar, Marshall & Co. |
| 3 April | Khio | Steamship | Edward Withy & Co. | West Hartlepool | United Kingdom | For The Pinkney & Sons Steamship Co. (Limited). |
| 4 April | Strathendrick | Steamship | Russell & Co. | Greenock | United Kingdom | For Burrell & Son. |
| 6 April | Calais-Douvres | Paddle steamer | Fairfield Shipbuilding & Engineering Co. | Govan | United Kingdom | For London, Chatham and Dover Railway. |
| 6 April | Delmar | Steamship | Raylton, Dixon & Co. | Middlesbrough | United Kingdom | For G. Tweedy & Co. |
| 6 April | Golden Hope | Steam trawler | Mackie & Thompson | Govan | United Kingdom | For W. R Leyman. |
| 6 April | Silver King | Steam trawler | Mackie & Thompson | Govan | United Kingdom | For James Leyman. |
| 11 April | County Antrim | Barque | Charles Joseph Bigger | Londonderry | United Kingdom | For W. H. Ross & Co. |
| 11 April | Adour | Steamship | Forges et Chantiers de la Méditerranée | La Seyne | France | ForCie. des Messageries Maritimes |
| 13 April | Aldersgate | Steamship | C. S. Swan & Hunter | Wallsend | United Kingdom | For Aldersgate Steamship Company (Limited). |
| 13 April | Alfofd | Steamship | Hall, Russell & Co. | Aberdeen | United Kingdom | For Adam Steamship Co. |
| 13 April | Modjeska | Steamship | Napier, Shanks & Bell | Yoker | United Kingdom | For Hamilton Steamboat Co. Ltd. |
| 13 April | Unnamed | Steamship | Robert Stephenson & Co. | Hebburn | United Kingdom | For Mediterranean and New York Steamship Co. |
| 15 April | Craigearne | Full-rigged ship | Robert Duncan & Co. | Port Glasgow | United Kingdom | For R. R. Paterson. |
| 15 April | Hongkong | Steamship | Caird & Co. | Greenock | United Kingdom | For Peninsular and Oriental Steam Navigation Company. |
| 15 April | Rosary | Steamship | Ramage & Ferguson | Leith | United Kingdom | For Harrison & Dixon. |
| 16 April | Amy | Steam yacht | John Fullerton & Co. | Merksworth | United Kingdom | For James Neill. |
| 16 April | Barrosa | Barracouta-class cruiser | | Portsmouth Dockyard | United Kingdom | For Royal Navy. |
| 16 April | Hazlemere | Steamship | Robert Thompson & Sons | Southwick | United Kingdom | For F. A. Jacques & Co. |
| 16 April | Isleworth | Steamship | W. Gray & Co. (Limited) | West Hartlepool | United Kingdom | For Watts, Ward & Co. |
| 16 April | Reggio | Steamship | R. Irvine & Co | West Hartlepool | United Kingdom | For Orders & Handford. |
| 17 April | Embirocos | Steamship | MacIlwaine & MacColl | Belfast | United Kingdom | For A. Embiricos. |
| 17 April | Mombassa | Steamship | James Laing | Deptford | United Kingdom | For British India Steam Navigation Co. Ltd. |
| 17 April | Unnamed | Fishing boat | George Duncan | Macduff | United Kingdom | For private owner. |
| 17 April | Unnamed | Barque | Russell & Co. | Kingston | United Kingdom | For private owner. |
| 18 April | Dragon | Yacht | Fife & Son | Fairlie | United Kingdom | For F. C. Hill. |
| 18 April | Hydarnes | Steamship | John Reid & Co. | Port Glasgow | United Kingdom | For R. P. Houston & Co. |
| 20 April | Elba | Steamship | Raylton Dixon & Co. | Middlesbrough | United Kingdom | For English and American Shipping Company (Limited). |
| 22 April | Unnamed | Steamship | Davie & M'Kendrick | Govan | United Kingdom | For private owner. |
| 23 April | Kaiser Wilhelm II | Steamship | | Stettin | Germany | For Norddeutsche Lloyd. |
| 25 April | Florida | Steamship | Robert Mills & Co. | Buffalo, New York | United States | For Peter P. Miller. |
| 25 April | Redbreast | Redbreast-class gunboat | | Pembroke Dockyard | United Kingdom | For Royal Navy. |
| 27 April | Lancashire | Cargo ship | Harland & Wolff | Belfast | United Kingdom | For Bibby Steamship Co. |
| 27 April | Vautour | Condor-class cruiser | | Toulon | France | For French Navy. |
| 30 April | Capua | Steamship | Alexander Stephen and Sons | Glasgow | United Kingdom | For R. M. Sloman & Co. |
| 30 April | Ringdove | Redbreast-class gunboat | | Devonport Dockyard | United Kingdom | For Royal Navy. |
| 30 April | Skipjack | Sharpshooter-class torpedo gunboat | | Chatham Dockyard | United Kingdom | For Royal Navy. |
| April | Beaver | Hopper dredger | William Simons & Co. | Renfrew | United Kingdom | For Natal Harbour Board. |
| April | Calypso | Steamship | Scott & Co. | Greenock | United Kingdom | For Ocean Steamship Company. |
| April | Craigend | Full-rigged ship | Russell & Co. | Port Glasgow | United Kingdom | For private owner. |
| April | Franklin | Steamship | Hamilton & Co. | Port Glasgow | United Kingdom | For Ballingall & Garroway. |
| April | Glenmark | Barque | Russell & Co. | Port Glasgow | United Kingdom | For W. O. Taylor & Sons. |
| April | Helga | Full-rigged ship | A. M'Millan & Son | Dumbarton | United Kingdom | For J. W. Carmichael & Co. |
| April | Morados | Steam launch | Davie & M'Kendrick | Govan | United Kingdom | For private owner. |
| April | Occident | Full-rigged ship | Charles Connell & Co. | Scotstoun | United Kingdom | For private owner. |
| April | Oread | Yacht | William Fife & Son | Fairlie | United Kingdom | For Andrew Jameson. |
| 1 May | Duchess of Cornwall | Steamship | W. Gray & Co. | West Hartlepool | United Kingdom | For private owner. |
| 1 May | Newfield | Barque | Alexander Stephen & Sons | Dundee | United Kingdom | For Brownels & Co. |
| 1 May | Valkyrie | Yacht | Fay & Co. | Northam | United Kingdom | For Earl of Dunraven. |
| 1 May | Windward | Yacht | Fife & Son | Fairlie | United Kingdom | For Mr. Cross. |
| 1 May | Winnie | Steamship | Grangemouth Dockyard Company | Grangemouth | United Kingdom | For C. Neilson & Son. |
| 2 May | Magdalena | Ocean liner | Robert Napier and Sons | Govan | United Kingdom | For Royal Mail Steam Packet Company. |
| 2 May | Talca | Barque | R. & J. Evans & Co. | Liverpool | United Kingdom | For Samuel Wakeham & Son. |
| 3 May | Jelunga | Steamship | William Denny & Bros. | Dumbarton | United Kingdom | For British India Associated Steamers. |
| 4 May | Antelope | Steamship | Laird Bros. | Birkenhead | United Kingdom | For Great Western Railway. |
| 6 May | Caledonia | Steamship | John Reid & Co. | Port Glasgow | United Kingdom | For Caledonian Railway. |
| 6 May | Woodcock | Cutter | Camper & Nicholson | Gosport | United Kingdom | For private owner. |
| 13 May | Blairmount | Merchantman | Sunderland Shipbuilding Co. Ltd. | Sunderland | United Kingdom | For Adam & Co. |
| 13 May | Collingham | Steamship | Raylton Dixon & Co. | Middlesbrough | United Kingdom | For private owner. |
| 14 May | Gorm | Steamship | Lobnitz & Co. | Renfrew | United Kingdom | For L. H. Carl. |
| 14 May | Janet Cowan | full-rigged ship | Barclay, Curle & Co. (Limited) | Whiteinch | United Kingdom | For Robert Shankland & Co. |
| 14 May | Megna | Steamship | William Denny & Bros. | Dumbarton | United Kingdom | For J. M. Denny & partners. |
| 15 May | Attilla | Tanker | Craggs & Son | Middlesbrough | United Kingdom | For J. M. Lennard & Sons. |
| 15 May | Lady Gwendoline | Paddle steamer | J. M'Arthur & Co. | Abbotsinch | United Kingdom | For Edwards, Robertson & Co. |
| 16 May | Barracouta | Barracouta-class cruiser | | Sheerness Dockyard | United Kingdom | For Royal Navy. |
| 16 May | Daventry | Steamship | Edward Withy & Co. | Hartlepool | United Kingdom | For Sievewright, Bacon & Co. |
| 16 May | Deerhound | cutter | Black & Co. | Southampton | United Kingdom | For Mr. Nottage. |
| 16 May | Douro | Steamship | Richardson, Duck & Co. | Stockton-on-Tees | United Kingdom | For Thomas Wilson, Sons & Co. |
| 16 May | Sarah Radcliffe | Steamship | Ropner & Sons | Stockton-on-Tees | United Kingdom | For Evan Thomas, Radcliff & Co. |
| 16 May | Scotia | Steamship | D. & W. Henderson & Co. | Meadowside | United Kingdom | For Anchor Line. |
| 16 May | Tancarville | Tanker | Craig, Taylor & Co. | Sunderland | United Kingdom | For Alfred Stuart. |
| 17 May | Monte Video | Steamship | Ailsa Shipbuilding Co. | Troon | United Kingdom | For Messageries Fluviales del Plata. |
| 17 May | Nugget | Coaster | Scott & Co. Ltd. | Bowling | United Kingdom | For William Robertson. |
| 18 May | Dunmore Head | Steamship | Workman, Clark & Co. | Belfast | United Kingdom | For Ulster Steamship Company, Limited. |
| 18 May | Empress | Steamship | Grangemouth Dockyard Company | Alloa | United Kingdom | For Biscay Steamship Company. |
| 18 May | Goldfinch | Redbreast-class gunboat | | Sheerness Dockyard | United Kingdom | For Royal Navy. |
| 18 May | Inca | Barque | William Pickersgill & Sons | Sunderland | United Kingdom | For Samuel Wakeham & Son. |
| 18 May | Kaiser Franz Joseph I | Kaiser Franz Joseph 1-class cruiser | Stabilimento Technico Triestino | Trieste | Trieste | For Austro-Hungarian Navy. |
| 18 May | St. Anns | Steamship | Craggs Bros. | Stockton-on-Tees | United Kingdom | For Jacques & Knowles. |
| 18 May | The Ark | Pleasure boat | E. M'Gruer | Glasgow | United Kingdom | For Clyde Amateur Rowing Club. |
| 18 May | Unnamed | Steam launch | D. B. Livie Jr. | Dundee | United Kingdom | For Maitland Dougal. |
| 20 May | Aries | Steam yacht | T. B. Seath & Co. | Rutherglen | United Kingdom | For Sir James Ramsden. |
| 20 May | Dalswinton | Full-rigged ship | Robert Duncan & Co. | Port Glasgow | United Kingdom | For Village Line. |
| 20 May | Merqueder | Steamship | Campbeltown Shipbuilding Co. | Campbeltown | United Kingdom | For Mercader é Hijos. |
| 20 May | Tamar | Full-rigged ship | Napier, Shanks & Bell | Yoker | United Kingdom | For Devitt & Moore. |
| 21 May | Glencairn | Steamship | John Priestman & Co. | Sunderland | United Kingdom | For R. Livingstone & Co. |
| 26 May | Australien | Ocean liner | Compagnie des Messageries Maritimes | La Ciotat | France | For Compagnie des Messageries Maritimes. |
| 29 May | Dalegarth | Steamship | John Readhead & Sons | South Shields | United Kingdom | For Clapham Steam Shipping Company (Limited). |
| 29 May | Mortlake | Steamship | W. Gray & Co. (Limited) | West Hartlepool | United Kingdom | For Watts, Ward & Co. |
| 30 May | Alarich | Steamship | W. Gray & Co. (Limited) | West Hartlepool | United Kingdom | For Johannes Lunge. |
| 30 May | Ethelrida | Steamship | Joseph L. Thompson & Sons | Sunderland | United Kingdom | For J. H. Harrowing. |
| 30 May | Laverock | Paddle steamer | John Scott & Co. | Kinghorn | United Kingdom | For General Steam Navigation Company. |
| 30 May | Red Sea | Steamship | W. B. Thompson & Co. | Dundee | United Kingdom | For Dundee, Perth, and London Shipping Company. |
| 30 May | Reindeer | Steamship | Craig, Taylor & Co. | Stockton-on-Tees | United Kingdom | For Jackson Bros. & Co. |
| 30 May | Semiramis | Steam yacht | Ramage & Ferguson | Leith | United Kingdom | For John Lysaght. |
| 31 May | Galatea | Paddle steamer | Caird & Co. | Greenock | United Kingdom | For Caledonia Steam Packet Co. |
| 31 May | Helene Rickmers | Steamship | Russell & Co. | Greenock | United Kingdom | For Messrs. Rickmers. |
| 31 May | Seagull | Sharpshooter-class torpedo gunboat | | Chatham Dockyard | United Kingdom | For Royal Navy. |
| May | Astore | Lugger | William Fife & Son | Fairlie | United Kingdom | For T. Steven Jr. |
| May | Baron Elibank | Steamship | Murdoch & Murray | Port Glasgow | United Kingdom | For Hugh Hogarth. |
| May | Clutha | Sloop | William Fife & Son | Fairlie | United Kingdom | For W. E. Meats. |
| May | Dragon | Cutter | William Fife & Son | Fairlie | United Kingdom | For F. C. Hill. |
| May | Elginshire | Full-rigged ship | Birrell, Stenhouse & Co. | Dumbarton | United Kingdom | For Thomas Law & Co. |
| May | Tungue | Steamship | Scott & Co. | Greenock | United Kingdom | For Mala Real Portuguesa Co. |
| May | Yvonne | Cutter | William Fife & Son | Fairlie | United Kingdom | For Peter Donaldson. |
| 1 June | Imperator Nikolai I | Imperator Aleksandr II-class battleship | Franco-Russian Works | Saint Petersburg | Russia | For Imperial Russian Navy. |
| 1 June | Unnamed | Steamship | C. S. Swan & Hunter | Wallsend | United Kingdom | For Huddart, Parker & Co. |
| 1 June | Unnamed | Steamship | C. S. Swan & Hunter | Wallsend | United Kingdom | For private owner. |
| 3 June | Africa | Steam lighter | David J. Dunlop & Co. | Port Glasgow | United Kingdom | For Royal Niger Company, Chartered and Limited. |
| 3 June | Ironopolis | Steamship | Raylton Dixon & Co. | Stockton-on-Tees | United Kingdom | For J. M. Lennard & Sons. |
| 3 June | Unnamed | Tanker | Palmer's Shipbuilding & Iron Company | Jarrow | United Kingdom | For private owner. |
| 4 June | Nyassa | Steamship | Alexander Stephen & Sons | Linthouse | United Kingdom | For Maclay & M'Intyre. |
| 8 June | Paradox | Yacht | | Eastbourne | United Kingdom | For Leybourne Popham. |
| 10 June | Camphill | Barque | Charles Joseph Bigger | Londonderry | United Kingdom | For Camphill Ship Co. Ltd. |
| 10 June | Jura | Steam yacht | Paul Jones & Sons | Cardwell Bay | United Kingdom | For John Neill. |
| 11 June | Camphill | Barque | Charles J. Bigger | Londonderry | United Kingdom | For William Johnston & Co. |
| 11 June | Brabloch | Full-rigged ship | Barclay, Curle & Co. | Whiteinch | United Kingdom | For Aitken, Lilburn & Co. |
| 12 June | Geiserich | Steamship | W. Gray & Co. (Limited) | West Hartlepool | United Kingdom | For Johannes Lange. |
| 12 June | Iredale | Barque | Workman, Clark & Co. | Belfast | United Kingdom | For P. Iredale & Son. |
| 12 June | Nigretia | Steam lighter | David J Dunlop & Co. | Port Glasgow | United Kingdom | For Royal Niger Company, Chartered and Limited. |
| 12 June | Portia | Steam yacht | Caird & Co. (Limited) | Greenock | United Kingdom | For Herbert Foster. |
| 13 June | Iiltyd | Steamship | T. Turnbull & Sons | Whitby | United Kingdom | For Turnbull Bros. |
| 13 June | Redpole | Redbreast-class gunboat | | Pembroke Dockyard | United Kingdom | For Royal Navy. |
| 13 June | Vulcan | Torpedo boat tender | | Portsmouth Dockyard | United Kingdom | For Royal Navy. |
| 13 June | Unnamed | Tug | Edward Finch & Co. | Chepstow | United Kingdom | For Barry Dock and Railways Company. |
| 15 June | Aislaby | Steamship | Ropner & Son | Stockton-on-Tees | United Kingdom | For R. Ropner & Co. |
| 15 June | Crimea | Steamship | Blyth Shipbuilding Co. Ltd | Blyth | United Kingdom | For Stephens, Mawson & Goss. |
| 15 June | Haldon | Steamship | Edward Withy & Co. | West Hartlepool | United Kingdom | For John Holman & Sons. |
| 15 June | May Flower | Tug | George W. Brown & Sons | Hull | United Kingdom | For Fanny Palmer. |
| 15 June | Orotava | Steamship | Naval Construction and Armaments Company | Barrow-in-Furness | United Kingdom | For Pacific Steam Navigation Company. |
| 15 June | Parahyba | Merchantman | William Doxford & Sons | Sunderland | United Kingdom | For Chargeurs Réunis. |
| 15 June | Yuen Sang | Steamship | Hall, Russell & Co. | Aberdeen | United Kingdom | For Indo-China Steam Navigation Company Limited. |
| 15 June | Unnamed | Steamship | Hawthorn, Leslie & Co., Limited. | Hebburn | United Kingdom | For private owner. |
| 15 June | Unnamed | Steamship | Palmer's Shipbuilding and Iron Company | Jarrow | United Kingdom | For private owner. |
| 15 June | Unnamed | Steamship | Blyth Shipbuilding Company | Blyth | United Kingdom | For Stephens, Mawson & Goss. |
| 15 June | Unnamed | Steamship | Wood, Skinner & Co. | Newcastle upon Tyne | United Kingdom | For Fearnley & Eger. |
| 15 June | Unnamed | Steamship | Robert Stephenson & Co. | Hebburn | United Kingdom | For Money, Wigram, and Sons, Limited. |
| 17 June | Dunkerque | Barque | Russell & Co. | Kingston | United Kingdom | For A. D. Bordes et Fils. |
| 17 June | Unnamed | Steamship | Palmer's Shipbuilding and Iron Company | Howdon | United Kingdom | For private owner. |
| 18 June | Bawnmore | Steamship | Archibald M'Millan & Son | Dumbarton | United Kingdom | For William J. Woodside & Co. |
| 18 June | Daylight | Steamship | Raylton Dixon & Co. | Middlesbrough | United Kingdom | For John Wood & Co. |
| 18 June | Lord Aberdeen | Steamship | S. M'Knight & Co. | Ayr | United Kingdom | For J. & A. Wyllie. |
| 19 June | Johanna Œlssner | Steamship | W. Harkiss & Son | Middlesbrough | United Kingdom | For H. Vogemann. |
| 20 June | Constellation | Schooner | Pipegras Shipyard | City Island, New York | United States | For E. D. Morgan. |
| 25 June | Leconfield | Steamship | Schlesinger, Davis & Co. | Wallsend | United Kingdom | For G. R. Sanderson & Co. |
| 25 June | Planet | Torpedo boat | Palmer's Shipbuilding and Iron Company | Jarrow | United Kingdom | For Austro-Hungarian Navy. |
| 26 June | King Robert | Full-rigged ship | William Hamilton & Co. | Port Glasgow | United Kingdom | For John A. Walker & Co. |
| 26 June | Queensmore | Cargo ship | Harland & Wolff | Belfast | United Kingdom | For William Johnstone. |
| 27 June | Queen Mab | Yacht | James Adam | Gourock | United Kingdom | For John Neil Jr. |
| 28 June | Garlands | Steamship | W. Gray & Co. (Limited) | West Hartlepool | United Kingdom | For Hardy, Wilson & Co. |
| 29 June | Aberfeldy | Steamship | John Readhead & Sons | South Shields | United Kingdom | For Maclean, Doughty & Co. |
| 29 June | China | Steamship | Fairfield Shipbuilding and Engineering Company | Fairfield | United Kingdom | For Pacific Mail Steamship Company. |
| 29 June | Ebro | Steamship | Richardson, Duck & Co. | South Stockton | United Kingdom | For Thomas Wilson, Sons & Co. |
| 29 June | Empress | Steamship | W. Gray & Co. (Limited) | West Hartlepool | United Kingdom | For C. M. Webster. |
| 29 June | Majestic | Teutonic-class ocean liner | Harland & Wolff | Belfast | United Kingdom | For White Star Line |
| 29 June | The Moray | Steamship | Grangemouth and Alloa Dockyard Company | Kelliebank | United Kingdom | For Mr. Adam. |
| 29 June | Unnamed | Steamship | Osbourne, Graham & Co, | North Hylton | United Kingdom | For Christopher Farness. |
| 29 June | Unnamed | Steamship | Wigham, Richardson & Co. | Low Walker | United Kingdom | For Fratelli Lavarello fu Gio Batta. |
| June | Emerald | Steamship | John Fullerton & Co. | Paisley | United Kingdom | For William Robertson. |
| June | Iota | Yacht | W. Fyffe & Sons | Fairlie | United Kingdom | For A. J. Matier. |
| June | Magic | Cutter | W. Fyffe & Sons | Fairlie | United Kingdom | For W. Higgen. |
| June | Rheinfels | Steamship | Sunderland Shipbuilding Co. Ltd. | Sunderland | United Kingdom | For Deutsche Dampfschiffahrts-Gesellschaft Hansa. |
| June | Shangimi | Steamship | Caird & Co. | Greenock | United Kingdom | For Peninsular and Oriental Steam Navigation Company. |
| June | Shibbeal | Cutter | W. Fyffe & Sons | Fairlie | United Kingdom | For H. Neil Jr. |
| June | Valentine Alsina | Dredger | Fleming & Ferguson | Paisley | United Kingdom | For T. A. Walker. |
| June | W. E. Gladstone | Steam trawler | David M'Gill & Co. | Irvine | United Kingdom | For Widdowson & Spring. |
| June | Wychwood | Barque | James Laing | Sunderland | United Kingdom | For Robert H. Gayner. |
| 1 July | Hibernia | Steamship | Raylton Dixon & Co. | Middlesbrough | United Kingdom | For International Line Steamship Company (Limited). |
| 1 July | Rei de Portugal | Steamship | Scott & Co. | Greenock | United Kingdom | For Mala Real Portugueza. |
| 1 July | Unnamed | Steamship | William Denny & Bros. | Dumbarton | United Kingdom | For Australasian United Steamship Company (Limited). |
| 2 July | Alphonse Parran | Steamship | William Doxford and Sons | Pallion | United Kingdom | For Anglo-Algerian Steamship Co. Ltd. |
| 4 July | Unnamed | Hopper dredger | William Simons & Co. | Renfrew | United Kingdom | For Board of Trade. |
| 4 July | Audacieux | Agile-class seagoing torpedo boat | Forges et Chantiers de la Méditerranée | La Seyne | France | For French Navy |
| 5 July | Alice A. Leigh | Merchantman | Whitehaven Shipbuilding Company | Whitehaven | United Kingdom | For Joyce & Co. |
| 11 July | Adula | Steamship | MacIlwaine & MacColl (Limited) | Belfast | United Kingdom | For Leach, Harrison & Forwood. |
| 11 July | Nairnshire | Steamship | Hawthorn, Leslie & Co. (Limited) | Hebburn-on-Tyne | United Kingdom | For Turnbull, Martin & Co. |
| 11 July | Philomel | Paddle steamer | John Scott & Co. | Kinghorn | United Kingdom | For General Steam Navigation Company. |
| 11 July | Raven | Steam yacht | T. B. Seath & Co. | Pooley Bridge | United Kingdom | For private owner. |
| 11 July | Uranus | Steamship | Workman, Clark & Co. | Belfast | United Kingdom | For Macleod & Co. |
| 13 July | Ermanarich | Steamship | W. Gray & Co. (Limited) | West Hartlepool | United Kingdom | For Johannes Lange. |
| 13 July | Norna | Steamship | S. & H. Morton | Leith | United Kingdom | For J. T. Salvesen. |
| 13 July | Tyneside | Steamship | Ropner & Son | Stockton-on-Tees | United Kingdom | For Christopher Furness. |
| 13 July | Unnamed | Steamship | Tyne Iron Shipbuilding Co. | Willington Quay | United Kingdom | For Mr. Krogius. |
| 15 July | Unnamed | Steamship | Thomas and William Smith | North Shields | United Kingdom | For Dixon, Robson & Co. |
| 15 July | Maggie | Steamship | Richardson, Duck & Co. | Stockton-on-Tees | United Kingdom | For Burdick & Cool. |
| 15 July | Mary Thomas | Steamship | Palmer's Shipbuilding and Iron Company (Limited) | Jarrow | United Kingdom | For Evan Thomas, Radcliff & Co. |
| 15 July | Realm | Steamship | Ramage & Ferguson | Leith | United Kingdom | For R. Conaway & Co. |
| 15 July | Wyncliffe | Steamship | Craig, Taylor & Co | Stockton-on-Tees | United Kingdom | For Douglas H. Morgan & Co. |
| 16 July | Unnamed | Steamship | Wood, Skinner & Co | Newcastle upon Tyne | United Kingdom | For Otto Thorsen. |
| 17 July | Dalmally | Steamship | Edward Withy & Co. | Hartlepool | United Kingdom | For George Horsley & Son. |
| 18 July | Itsukushima | Matsushima-class cruiser | Forges et Chantiers de la Méditerranée | La Seyne | France | For Imperial Japanese Navy. |
| 18 July | Unnamed | Lifeboat | D. Livie & Sons | Dundee | United Kingdom | For Royal National Lifeboat Institution. |
| 18 July | Agile | Agile-class seagoing torpedo boat | Forges et Chantiers de la Méditerranée | La Seyne | France | For French Navy |
| 22 July | Ribago | Steamship | David J. Dunlop & Co. | Port Glasgow | United Kingdom | For Royal Niger Company (Chartered and Limited). |
| 24 July | Whiting | Sharpshooter-class torpedo gunboat | Armstrong Whitworth | Elswick | United Kingdom | For Royal Navy. |
| 27 July | Duchess of Fife | Lifeboat | Singleton Bros. | Fleetown | United Kingdom | For Royal National Lifeboat Institution. |
| 27 July | King Alfred | Steamship | Blyth Shipbuilding Co. Ltd | Blyth | United Kingdom | For King Alfred Steamship Co. Ltd. |
| 27 July | Merrion | Steamship | Irvine & Co. | West Hartlepool | United Kingdom | For Trechmann & Co. |
| 27 July | Yorkshire | Cargo ship | Harland & Wolff | Belfast | United Kingdom | For Bibby Steamship Co. |
| 28 July | Confienza | Goito-class torpedo cruiser | Arsenale di La Spezia | La Spezia | Italy | For Regia Marina. |
| 29 July | Inchmarlo | Merchanman | Robert Thompson & Sons | Sunderland | United Kingdom | For Hamilton Fraser. |
| 29 July | Port Douglas | Merchantman | Russell & Co. | Port Glasgow | United Kingdom | For Crawford & Rowat. |
| 30 July | Elmville | Steamship | W. Gray & Co. (Limited) | West Hartlepool | United Kingdom | For R. Shadforth & Co. |
| 31 July | Aconcaqua | Steamship | John Reid & Co. | Port Glasgow | United Kingdom | For Compania Sud Americana de Vapores. |
| 31 July | Manhattan | Tanker | David J. Dunlop & Co. | Port Glasgow | United Kingdom | For Anglo-American Oil Company (Limited). |
| 31 July | Twilight | Steamship | Grangemouth Dockyard Company | Grangemouth | United Kingdom | For Christopher Furness. |
| July | Duchess of Sutherland | Fishing boat | J. & W. Mackintosh | Portessie | United Kingdom | For Donald Sutherland. |
| 1 August | Polo | Steamship | Earle's Shipbuilding Company | Hull | United Kingdom | For Wilson Line. |
| 1 August | Syria | Steamship | Raylton Dixon & Co. | Middlesbrough | United Kingdom | For Baildy & Leetham. |
| 1 August | Ulaia | Yacht | Robert M'Allister | Dumbarton | United Kingdom | For J. F. Borthwick & Co. |
| 7 August | Cambridge | Steamship | C. S. Swan, Hunter & Co. | Wallsend | United Kingdom | For Great Western Steamship Company (Limited). |
| 7 August | Unnamed | Steamship | Finch & Co. | Chepstow | United Kingdom | For John Pile. |
| 8 August | Aquarius | Steam trawler | Mackie & Thompson | Govan | United Kingdom | For Grimsby and North Sea Steam Trawling Company, Limited. |
| 8 August | Capricornus | Steam trawler | Mackie & Thompson | Govan | United Kingdom | For Grimsby and North Sea Steam Trawling Company, Limited. |
| 10 August | Burton | Steamship | R. Craggs & Son | Stockton-on-Tees | United Kingdom | For W. F. Beaumont. |
| 10 August | Marcobrunner | Steamship | Sunderland Shipbuilding Co. Ltd. | Sunderland | United Kingdom | For Deutsche Dampfschiffahrts-Gesellschaft Hansa. |
| 10 August | Nellie Troop | Barque | Charles Hill & Sons | Bristol | United Kingdom | For Troop & Son. |
| 10 August | Neotsfield | Full-rigged ship | A M'Millan & Son | Dumbarton | United Kingdom | For Dangar, Grant & Co. |
| 10 August | Siegfried | Siegfried-class coastal defense ship | Germaniawerft | Kiel | Germany | For Kaiserliche Marine. |
| 12 August | Aurora | Steamship | Ropner & Son | Stockton-on-Tees | United Kingdom | For Rickinson, Sons & Co. |
| 12 August | Calliope | Steamship | W. Gray & Co. (Limited) | West Hartlepool | United Kingdom | For Gladstone & Cornforth. |
| 12 August | Redcar | Steamship | W. Gray & Co. (Limited) | West Hartlepool | United Kingdom | For English & Co. |
| 13 August | Aska | Steamship | Ailsa Shipbuilding Company | Troon | United Kingdom | For British India Steam Navigation Company (Limited). |
| 13 August | Florence | Steamship | Short Brothers | Sunderland | United Kingdom | For E. T. Gourley. |
| 13 August | Rydal Holme | Steamship | John Blumer & Co. | Sunderland | United Kingdom | For Hine Bros. |
| 13 August | Torridon | Steamship | Osbourne, Graham & Co. | North Hylton | United Kingdom | For James Gardiner & Co. |
| 13 August | Unnamed | Steamship | Tyne Iron Shipbuilding Company, Limited | Willington Quay | United Kingdom | For Hunting & Pattison. |
| 14 August | Loanda | Steamship | Scott & Co. | Greenock | United Kingdom | For Mala Real Portugueza. |
| 15 August | Bellona | Steamship | D. & W. Henderson & Company | Meadowside | United Kingdom | For Bell Brothers & M'Lelland. |
| 15 August | Friesland | Steamship | James & George Thomson | Clydebank | United Kingdom | For Red Star Line. |
| 15 August | St. Fergus | Steamship | Fleming & Ferguson | Paisley | United Kingdom | For Wick and Pulteneytown Shipping Company. |
| 15 August | Unnamed | Steam yacht | Robert Gordon | Greenock | United Kingdom | For W. Brand. |
| 16 August | Rex | Steamship | Ramage & Ferguson | Leith | United Kingdom | For R. Conaway & Co. |
| 16 August | Widgeon | Redbreast-class gunboat | | Pembroke Dockyard | United Kingdom | For Royal Navy. |
| 22 August | Count Kalncky | Steamship | | Trieste | Trieste | For private owner. |
| 23 August | Hsin-Yu | Steamship | Napier, Shanks & Bell | Yoker | United Kingdom | For China Merchant Steam Navigation Company. |
| 24 August | Ameer | Cargo ship | Harland & Wolff | Belfast | United Kingdom | For T. & J. Brocklebank. |
| 24 August | Avonmore | Steamship | Joseph L. Thompson & Sons | Sunderland | United Kingdom | For William Johnson & Co. |
| 24 August | Scandia | Ocean Liner | AG Vulcan | Stettin | Germany | For Hamburg-Amerikanische Packetfahrt-Actien-Gesellschaft. |
| 26 August | Parkgate | Steamship | T. Turnbull & Son | Whitby | United Kingdom | For Turnbull, Scott & Co. |
| 27 August | Bluebell | Barque | William Pickersgill & Sons | Southwick | United Kingdom | For James Tedford & Co. |
| 27 August | Corennie | Coaster | Blyth Shipbuilding Co. Ltd | Blyth | United Kingdom | For W. T. Moffatt. |
| 27 August | Karrakatta | Sharpshooter-class torpedo gunboat | Armstrong Whitworth | Elswick | United Kingdom | For Royal Navy. |
| 27 August | Palestine | Steam fishing boat | Forbes & Birnie | Peterhead | United Kingdom | For private owner. |
| 27 August | Pandora | Pearl-class cruiser | Armstrong Whitworth | Elswick | United Kingdom | For Royal Navy. |
| 27 August | Staffa | Steamship | Edward Withy & Co. | Hartlepool | United Kingdom | For Herskind & Woods. |
| 27 August | St. Kilda | Steamship | Scott & Co. | Greenock | United Kingdom | For Robert Harper. |
| 27 August | Tabor | Steamship | Aitken & Mansel | Whiteinch | United Kingdom | For James Moss & Co. |
| 28 August | Bungaree | Steamship | J. Wigham, Richardson & Co. | Low Walker | United Kingdom | For Blue Anchor Line. |
| 29 August | Chingford | Steamship | W. Gray & Co. (Limited) | West Hartlepool | United Kingdom | For Pyman Bros. |
| 29 August | Cosmao | Troude-class protected cruiser | Forges et Chantiers de la Gironde | Lormont | United Kingdom | For French Navy. |
| 29 August | Haytor | Steamship | R. Craggs & Sons | Middlesbrough | United Kingdom | For John Holman & Sons. |
| 29 August | Iona | Steamship | Robert Thompson & Sons | Sunderland | United Kingdom | For Speeding Marshall. |
| 29 August | Russia | Steamship | Laird Bros. | Birkenhead | United Kingdom | For Hamburg-Amerikanische Packetfahrt-Actien-Gesellschaft. |
| 29 August | Sir Walter Raleigh | Steamship | Craig, Taylor & Co. | Stockton-on-Tees | United Kingdom | For Triplett & Co. |
| 29 August | Ulidia | Merchantman | Richardson, Duck & Co. | Stockton-on-Tees | United Kingdom | For W. Porter & Sons. |
| 31 August | Karlsruhe | Steamship | Fairfield Shipbuilding and Engineering Company (Limited) | Fairfield | United Kingdom | For Norddeutsche Lloyd. |
| 31 August | Treglisson | Cargo ship | John Readhead and Sons | South Shields | United Kingdom | For Edward Hain and Son |
| 31 August | Unnamed | Steamship | John Readhead and Sons | South Shields | United Kingdom | For E. Hain & Son. |
| August | Boma | Steamship | Naval Construction and Armaments Company | Barrow-in-Furness | United Kingdom | For British and African Steam Navigation Company. |
| 4 September | Unnamed | Steamship | C. S. Swan and Hunter. | Low Walker | United Kingdom | For private owner. |
| 6 September | Blanche | Barracouta-class cruiser | | Pembroke | United Kingdom | For Royal Navy |
| 7 September | Ifafa | Steamship | Hall, Russell & Co. | Aberdeen | United Kingdom | For J. T. Rennie & Sons. |
| 7 September | Philadelphia | Protected cruiser | William Cramp and Sons | Chester, Pennsylvania | United States | For United States Navy. |
| 9 September | Indiana | Steamship | Raylton Dixon & Co. | Middlesbrough | United Kingdom | For Bailey & Leetham. |
| 9 September | Lillian | Steamship | R. Irvine & Co. | West Hartlepool | United Kingdom | For J. S. Allison & Co. |
| 9 September | Unnamed | Steamship | Wood, Skinner & Co. | Newcastle upon Tyne | United Kingdom | For Wilhelm Wilhelmsen. |
| 10 September | Apache | Steamship | Raylton Dixon & Co. | Middlesbrough | United Kingdom | For private owner. |
| 10 September | Cairniehill | Barque | Russell & Co. | Kingston | United Kingdom | For W. T. Dickson & Sons. |
| 10 September | Holyrood | Steamship | Robert Duncan & Co. | Port Glasgow | United Kingdom | For Raeburn & Verel. |
| 11 September | Ackworth | Steamship | Ropner & Sons | Stockton-on-Tees | United Kingdom | For Joshua Merryweather & Co. |
| 11 September | Barham | Barham-class cruiser | | Portsmouth Dockyard | United Kingdom | For Royal Navy. |
| 11 September | Barraclough | Steamship | Ramage & Ferguson | Leith | United Kingdom | For West Hartlepool Steam Navigation Company. |
| 11 September | Marmion | Steamship | W. Gray & Co. | West Hartlepool | United Kingdom | For George Pyman & Co. |
| 11 September | Unnamed | Steamship | Palmer's Shipbuilding and Iron Company | Howdon | United Kingdom | For private owner. |
| 12 September | Blackheath | Steamship | W. Gray & Co. (Limited) | West Hartlepool | United Kingdom | For Watts, Ward & Co. |
| 12 September | Guide | Steamship | W. B. Thompson & Co. | Dundee | United Kingdom | For Indian Government. |
| 12 September | Hercules | Tug | Vosper & Co.f | Portsmouth | United Kingdom | For Shoreham Harbour Trustees. |
| 12 September | Salto | Paddle steamer | Ailsa Shipbuilding Company | Troon | United Kingdom | For Climaco Becker. |
| 13 September | Dalhousie | Tug | William Denny & Brothers | Dumbarton | United Kingdom | For Clive Steam Tug Company. |
| 14 September | Grace Harwar | Full-rigged ship | William Hamilton & Co. Ltd. | Port Glasgow | United Kingdom | For William Montgomery & Co. |
| 14 September | Hawthornbank | Barque | Russell & Co. | Port Glasgow | United Kingdom | For Andrew Weir & Co. |
| 14 September | James Hunter | Steamship | A. Hall & Co. | Footdee | United Kingdom | For Northern Co-Operative Company, Limited. |
| 14 September | Osseo | Barque | Charles Joseph Bigger | Londonderry | United Kingdom | For Bartholomew Herbert McCorkell and others. |
| 14 September | Unnamed | Merchantman | Russell & Co. | Port Glasgow | United Kingdom | For Andrew Weir & Co. |
| 17 September | Peter Rickmers | Full-rigged ship | Russell & Co. | Port Glasgow | United Kingdom | For R. C. Rickmers. |
| 23 September | Barmen | Steamship | Armstrong, Mitchell & Co. | Low Walker | United Kingdom | For "German-Australian Steamship Co." |
| 23 September | Kelburn | Full-rigged ship | Barclay, Curle & Co. | Whiteinch | United Kingdom | For Shankland & Co. |
| 24 September | Adams | Pilot boat | Moses Adams | Essex, Massachusetts | United States | For John H. Jeffries. |
| 24 September | Mangara | Steamship | Alexander Stephen & Sons | Linthouse | United Kingdom | For Maclay & M'Intyre. |
| 25 September | Relampago | Tug | Davy & M'Kendrick | Renfrew | United Kingdom | For private owner. |
| 25 September | Unnamed | Steamship | William Dobson & Co. | Newcastle upon Tyne | United Kingdom | For F. Stumore & Co. |
| 25 September | Unnamed | Steamship | Schlesinger, Davis & Co | Wallsend | United Kingdom | For John Pile & Co. |
| 26 September | Aid | Paddle tug | W. Allsup & Sons Ltd. | Preston | United Kingdom | For Board of Trade. |
| 26 September | Canton | Steamship | Caird & Co. | Greenock | United Kingdom | For Peninsular and Oriental Steam Navigation Company. |
| 26 September | Engelhorn | | | Whitehaven | United Kingdom | For private owner. Ran aground on launch. |
| 26 September | Nawab | Cargo ship | Harland & Wolff | Belfast | United Kingdom | For Asiatic Steamship Co. |
| 26 September | Sparrow | Redbreast-class gunboat | Scotts Shipbuilding and Engineering Co. | Greenock | United Kingdom | For Royal Navy. |
| 26 September | Tuskar | Steamship | Richardson, Duck & Co. | Stockton-on-Tees | United Kingdom | For Farrar, Groves & Co. |
| 27 September | Iona | Steamship | W. Gray & Co. | West Hartlepool | United Kingdom | For Herskind & Woods. |
| 27 September | Orion | Steamship | Raylton Dixon & Co. | Middlesbrough | United Kingdom | For Star Line. |
| 28 September | Araquipa | Steamship | Naval Construction and Armaments Company | Barrow-in-Furness | United Kingdom | For Pacific Steam Navigation Company. |
| 28 September | Bavaria | Steamship | Murdoch & Murray | Port Glasgow | United Kingdom | For David Scott & Son. |
| 28 September | Camiola | Steamship | John Readhead & Sons | South Shields | United Kingdom | For Chapman & Miller. |
| 28 September | Humber | Steamship | David J. Dunlop & Co. | Port Glasgow | United Kingdom | For William Sloan and Co. |
| 28 September | Ivy | Steamship | Raylton Dixon & Co. | Middlesbrough | United Kingdom | For John Hunter. |
| 28 September | Mira | Steamship | Aitken & Mansel | Whiteinch | United Kingdom | For Star Line. |
| 28 September | Mozambique | Steamship | Scott & Sons | Greenock | United Kingdom | For Mala Real Portugueza. |
| 28 September | Romola | Steamship | Ropner & Sons | Stockton-on-Tees | United Kingdom | For Herskin & Woods. |
| 28 September | Unnamed | Tanker | J. & J. Hay | Kirkintilloch | United Kingdom | For James Ross & Co. |
| 28 September | Unnamed | Steamship | E. Withy & Co | location | United Kingdom | For private owner. |
| 28 September | Unnamed | Steamship | Schlesinger, Davis & Co. | Wallsend | United Kingdom | For Hajee Abdullatiff Balladina and Hajee Joosub Parbhoy. |
| 28 September | Unnamed | Steamship | Palmer's Shipbuilding and Iron Company | Newcastle upon Tyne | United Kingdom | For private owner. |
| September | Eagle | Steamship | R. & W. Hawthorn, Leslie and Company | Hebburn | United Kingdom | For Russian Navigation Company. |
| September | Garnet | Steamship | John Blumer & Co. | Sunderland | United Kingdom | For Robinson Brothers Steamship Co. |
| September | Sommerfield | Steamship | Charles Connell & Co. | Scotstoun | United Kingdom | For "Hamburg-Australia Company." |
| September | Sophie Rickmers | Steamship | Russell & Co. | Greenock | United Kingdom | For Rickmers & Co. |
| September | Spindrift | Steamship | A. M'Millan & Son | Dumbarton | United Kingdom | For private owner. |
| September | Strathlyon | Steamship | Russell & Co. | Greenock | United Kingdom | For James Howden & Co. |
| September | Unnamed | Dredger | William Simons & Co. | Renfrew | United Kingdom | For Melbourne Harbour Commissioners. |
| 3 October | Unnamed | Steamship | Richardson, Duck & Co. | Stockton-on-Tees | United Kingdom | For Farrar, Groves & Co. |
| 4 October | Torgorm | Steamship | Campbeltown Shipbuilding Company | Campbeltown | United Kingdom | For Whimster & Watson. |
| 5 October | Unnamed | Steamship | Wood, Skinner & Co. | Newcastle upon Tyne | United Kingdom | For Jacob Burnett. |
| 8 October | Matadi | Steamship | Naval Construction and Armaments Company | Barrow-in-Furness | United Kingdom | For British and African Steam Navigation Company. |
| 7 October | Unnamed | Steamship | C. S. Swan & Hunter | Wallsend | United Kingdom | For private owner. |
| 8 October | North Cape | Steam trawler | Hall, Russell & Co. | Aberdeen | United Kingdom | For Mr. Pyper and others. |
| 8 October | North Pole | Steam trawler | Hall, Russell & Co. | Aberdeen | United Kingdom | For Mr. Pyper and others. |
| 10 October | Irex | Steamship | J. Reid & Co. | Port Glasgow | United Kingdom | For J. D. Clink & Co. |
| 10 October | Thrush | Redbreast-class gunboat | Scott & Co | Greenock | United Kingdom | For Royal Navy. |
| 11 October | Westbrook | Steamship | W. Gray & Co. (Limited) | West Hartlepool | United Kingdom | For John Foster & Co. |
| 12 October | Bankholme | Barque | Grangemouth Dockyard Company | Alloa | United Kingdom | For W. Just & Co. |
| 12 October | Colonist | Steamship | Osbourne, Graham & Co | Sunderland | United Kingdom | For Angier Line. |
| 12 October | Samara | Steamship | Mackie & Thomson | Govan | United Kingdom | For Maclay & M'Intyre. |
| 12 October | Sicilia | Steamship | William Pickersgill & Sons | Sunderland | United Kingdom | For Pierce, Becker & Ilardi. |
| 12 October | St. Fotin | Steam trawler | Alexander Russell & Co. | Aberdeen | United Kingdom | For Thomas Walker and others. |
| 14 October | Bellanoch | Steamship | D. & W. Henderson & Co. | Partick | United Kingdom | For Bell Bros. & McLelland. |
| 14 October | Portland | Paddle steamer | New England Shipbuilding Co. | Bath, Maine | United States | For Portland Steam Packet Co. |
| 22 October | Blonde | Barracouta-class cruiser | | Pembroke Dockyard | United Kingdom | For Royal Navy. |
| 24 October | Jean Bart | Jean Bart-class cruiser | Arsenal de Rochefort | Rochefort | France | For French Navy. |
| 26 October | Ailsa Craig | Steamship | W. B. Thompson & Co., Limited | Dundee | United Kingdom | For Clyde Shipping Company. |
| 26 October | Bahadur | Cargo ship | Harland & Wolff | Belfast | United Kingdom | For Asiatic Steamship Co. |
| 26 October 1889 | Spetsai | Hydra-class ironclad | Forges et Chantiers de la Méditerranée | Le Havre | France | For Royal Hellenic Navy. |
| 26 October | Cardiff Castle | Steamship | Bute Shipping, Engineering, & Dry Dock Co. | Cardiff | United Kingdom | For Morel Ltd. |
| 26 October | Mount Hebron | Steamship | MacIlwaine & MacColl | Belfast | United Kingdom | For Smith & Service. |
| 26 October | Raisby | Steamship | Ropner & Son | Stockton-on-Tees | United Kingdom | For R. Ropner & Co. |
| 26 October | Rauenthaler | Steamship | Sunderland Shipbuilding Co. Ltd. | Sunderland | United Kingdom | For Deutsche Dampfschiffahrts-Gesellschaft Hansa. |
| 26 October | San Francisco | Protected cruiser | Union Iron Works | San Francisco, California | United States | For United States Navy. |
| 26 October | Spezzia | Cruiser | Société Nouvelle des Forges et Chantiers de la Méditerranée | Havre de Grâce | France | For Royal Hellenic Navy. |
| 26 October | Siam | Barque | Grangemouth Dockyard Company | Grangemouth | United Kingdom | For A. O. Liudvig. |
| 26 October | Stuttgart | Steamship | Fairfield Shipbuilding & Engineering Company (Limited) | Govan | United Kingdom | For Norddeutsche Lloyd. |
| 28 October | Culgoa | Steamship | J. L. Thompson & Sons | Sunderland | United Kingdom | For Blue Anchor Line. |
| 28 October | Krim | Steamship | Blyth Shipbuilding Co. Ltd | Blyth | United Kingdom | For M. A. Schjelderup. |
| 28 October | Capella | Cargo liner | Charles Connell and Company | Glasgow | United Kingdom | For Charente Steamship Co. |
| 28 October | Phoenix | Pearl-class cruiser | J. & G. Thomson | Glasgow | United Kingdom | For Royal Navy. |
| 29 October | Carradale | Barque | Alexander Stephen & Sons | Linthouse | United Kingdom | For J. & A. Roxburgh. |
| 29 October | Lonsdale | Full-rigged ship | Charles Joseph Bigger | Londonderry | United Kingdom | For Dale Line. |
| 29 October | Port Patrick | Barque | Russell & Co. | Port Glasgow | United Kingdom | For Crawford & Rowat. |
| 29 October | Scottish Queen | Steam trawler | John Scott & Co. | Kinghorn | United Kingdom | For Robert Brown & Co. |
| 30 October | Ajax | Steamship | W. Dobson & Co | Newcastle upon Tyne | United Kingdom | For Torm Dampskibsselskabet. |
| 30 October | Tunbridge | Steamship | Raylton Dixon & Co. | Middlesbrough | United Kingdom | For J. Temperley & Co. |
| 31 October | Davout | Protected cruiser | Arsenal de Toulon | Toulon | France | For French Navy. |
| October | Emilio | Steam launch | D. M. Cumming | Parkhead | United Kingdom | For private owner. |
| October | Gascony | Steamship | M'Knight & Co. | Aye | United Kingdom | For Moss Steamship Company. |
| October | Katorla | Steamship | William Denny & Bros. | Dumbarton | United Kingdom | For British India Steam Navigation Company. |
| October | Mariposa | Steamship | Blackwood & Gordon | Port Glasgow | United Kingdom | For James & Alexander Allan. |
| October | Musashi Maru | Steamship | Lobnitz & Co. | Renfrew | United Kingdom | For Nippon Yusen Kaisha. |
| October | Queen Elizabeth | Merchantman | A. M'Millan & Sons | Dumbarton | United Kingdom | For Charles Failbon & Co. |
| October | Rajah Brooke | Steamship | Napier, Shanks & Bell | Yoker | United Kingdom | For Borneo Company (Limited). |
| October | Unnamed | Steamship | Fairfield Shipbuilding & Engineering Co. | Govan | United Kingdom | For Thomas Cook and Sons. |
| October | Unnamed | Steamship | J. & J. Hay | Kirkintilloch | United Kingdom | For James Ross & Co. |
| 4 November | Oranje Prince | Steamship | Sir W. G. Armstrong, Mitchell & Co. | Low Walker | United Kingdom | For James Knott. |
| 5 November | Capella | Steamship | Morton & Co. | Leith | United Kingdom | For Holland & Meizen. |
| 5 November | Hazelbank | Steamship | Charles Connell & Co. | Scotstoun | United Kingdom | For Andrew Weir & Co. |
| 5 November | Stanley | Full-rigged ship | Russell & Co. | Port Glasgow | United Kingdom | For G. M. Steeves. |
| 6 November | Norsa | Steamship | W. Gray & Co. (Limited) | West Hartlepool | United Kingdom | For Hersking & Woods. |
| 7 November | Beatrice | Steamship | Richardson, Duck & Co. | Stockton-on-Tees | United Kingdom | For Michael Murphy Jr. |
| 7 November | Croisseur | Tug | E. Smith & Co. | Lytham | United Kingdom | For private owner. |
| 7 November | Duchess of Albany | Paddle steamer | Scotts | Greenock | United Kingdom | For London, Brighton and South Coast Railway and London and South Western Railway. |
| 7 November | Verax | Steamship | Edward Withy & Co. | Hartlepool | United Kingdom | For George Horsley. |
| 7 November | Zoe | Steamship | T. Turnbull & Son | Whitby | United Kingdom | For Turner, Brightman & Co. |
| 8 November | Garnet | Steamship | Scott & Co. | Bowling | United Kingdom | For William Robertson. |
| 9 November | Parkmore | Steamship | Gourlay Bros. & Co. | Dundee | United Kingdom | For William Johnston & Co. |
| 9 November | Sirius | Steamship | Blyth Shipbuilding Co. Ltd | Blyth | United Kingdom | For Dampfschiffahrts Gesellschaft Neptun. |
| 18 November | Maine | Armoured cruiser | New York Navy Yard | Brooklyn | United States | For United States Navy. |
| 11 November | Unnamed | Steamship | A. & J. Inglis | Pointhouse | United Kingdom | For "British India Association". |
| 20 November | G. Ward Cole | Dredger | William Simons & Co. | Renfrew | United Kingdom | For Melbourn Harbour Commissioners. |
| 22 November | Rydal Hall | Steamship | Caird & Co. | Greenock | United Kingdom | For Alexander Hall & Co. |
| 22 November | Unnamed | Steamship | John Priestman & Co. | Southwick | United Kingdom | For T. P. Richards & Co. |
| 23 November | Æon | Steamship | Ropner & Son | Stockton-on-Tees | United Kingdom | For Newman & Dale. |
| 23 November | Blake | Blake-class protected cruiser | | Chatham Dockyard | United Kingdom | For Royal Navy. |
| 23 November | Bon Accord | Steamship | A. Hall & Co. | Aberdeen | United Kingdom | For J. & A. Davidson. |
| 23 November | Hochheimer | Steamship | Sunderland Shipbuilding Co. Ltd | Sunderland | United Kingdom | For Deutsche Dampfschiffahrts-Gesellschaft Hansa. |
| 23 November | Malange | Steamship | Scott & Co. | Greenock | United Kingdom | For Mala Real Portugueza. |
| 23 November | Oriziba | Steamship | Delaware River Iron Ship Building and Engine Works | Chester, Pennsylvania | United States | For private owner. |
| 23 November | Paragon | Steamship | Ailsa Shipbuilding Co. | Troon | United Kingdom | For Mackenzie & Co. |
| 23 November | Petroles | Tanker | Craig, Taylor & Co. | Stockton-on-Tees | United Kingdom | For Alfred Suart. |
| 23 November | Puritan | Full-rigged ship | John Reid & Co. | Port Glasgow | United Kingdom | For R. W. Cameron & Co. |
| 23 November | Ruby | Steam fishing vessel | Lee & Wright | Tweedmouth | United Kingdom | For J. S. Forrest. |
| 23 November | Soudan | Steamship | Naval Construction & Armaments Co. | Barrow-in-Furness | United Kingdom | For Elder, Dempster & Co. |
| 23 November | Strathdee | Steamship | Tyne Iron Shipbuilding Co. | Willington Quay | United Kingdom | For Burrell & Son. |
| 23 November | Ville du Havre | Merchantman | James Laing | Sunderland | United Kingdom | For Compagnie Havraise Peninsulaire Navigation à Vapeur. |
| 23 November | Unnamed | Steamship | Wood, Skinner & Co | Newcastle upon Tyne | United Kingdom | For William Swanston & Sons. |
| 23 November | Unnamed | Steamship | Palmer's Shipbuilding and Iron Company | Howdon | United Kingdom | For private owner. |
| 24 November | Alger | Alger-class protected cruiser | Arsenal de Cherbourg | Cherbourg | France | For French Navy. |
| 25 November | Kilmore | Steamship | Edwards Shipbuilding Company, Limited | Howdon-on-Tyne | United Kingdom | For W. Johnston & Co. |
| 26 November | Chemnitz | Steamship | Alexander Stephen & Sons | Linthouse | United Kingdom | For "German-Australian Steamship Company". |
| 27 November | Pelorus | Pearl-class protected cruiser | Armstrong Whitworth | Elswick | United Kingdom | For Royal Navy. |
| 27 November | Rameses the Great | Steamship | | Cairo | Egypt | For Thomas Cook & Son. |
| 27 November | William W. Ker | Schooner | Jackson & Sharp Company | Wilmington, Delaware | United States | For Philadelphia Pilots' Association. |
| 28 November | S51 | Torpedo boat | Schichau-Werke | Elbing | Germany | For Imperial German Navy |
| 30 November | Unnamed | Steamship | Raylton Dixon & Co. | Middlesbrough | United Kingdom | For Houlder Bros. & Co. |
| November | Amra | Coaster | Ailsa Shipbuilding Co. | Troon | United Kingdom | For British India Steam Navigation Company. |
| November | Baroda | Steamship | London and Glasgow Engineering and Iron Shipbuilding Company (Limited) | Govan | United Kingdom | For "Hamburg-Calcutta Steamship Company". |
| November | Garnet | Coaster | Scott & Co. | Greenock | United Kingdom | For William Robertson. |
| November | Guienne | Steamship | M'Knight & Co. | Ayr | United Kingdom | For Moss Steamship Company. |
| November | Hazelbank | Full-rigged ship | Charles Connell & Co. | Scotstoun | United Kingdom | For Andrew Weir & Co. |
| November | Juba | Coaster | Ailsa Shipbuilding Co. | Troon | United Kingdom | For British India Steam Navigation Company. |
| November | Langosta | Steamship | Blackwood & Gordon | Port Glasgow | United Kingdom | For James & Alexander Allan. |
| November | Latona | Steamship | Russell & Co. | Greenock | United Kingdom | For G. M. Steeves & Co. |
| 3 December | Flying Vulture | Tug | S. M'Knight & Co. | Ayr | United Kingdom | For Clyde Shipping Company. |
| 4 December | Dieppois | Steamship | T. R. Oswald & Co. | Milford Haven | United Kingdom | For Robert Delarne-Lebon. |
| 4 December | Unnamed | Steamship | Short Bros. | Pallion | United Kingdom | For Prince Steam Shipping Co. |
| 7 December | Aud | Steamship | Grangemouth Dockyard Company | Alloa | United Kingdom | For private owner. |
| 7 December | City of Vienna | Steamship | Workman, Clark & Co., Limited | Belfast | United Kingdom | For City Line. |
| 7 December | Glen Esk | Barque | Russell & Co. | Port Glasgow | United Kingdom | For W. O. Taylor & Sons. |
| 7 December | Lady Salisbury | Steamship | S. P. Austin & Son | Sunderland | United Kingdom | For Hawkins, Holman & Co. |
| 9 December | Charles Steels | Steamship | J. Priestman & Co. | Sunderland | United Kingdom | For Lily, Wilson & Co. |
| 9 December | Unnamed | Fishing boat | Stevenson & Asher | Macduff | United Kingdom | For Angus M'Leod. |
| 10 December | Dumfriesshire | Full-rigged ship | Russell & Co. | Port Glasgow | United Kingdom | For Thomas Law & Co. |
| 10 December | Psyche | Pearl-class cruiser | J. & G. Thomson | Glasgow | United Kingdom | For Royal Navy. |
| 10 December | Santanderino | Steamship | David & William Henderson | Port Glasgow | United Kingdom | For M. M. da Arrotegai. |
| 10 December | Thames | Steamship | R. Napier & Sons | Govan | United Kingdom | For Royal Mail Steam Packet Company. |
| 11 December | Monowai | Steamship | William Denny and Bros. | Dumbarton | United Kingdom | For Union Steamship Company of New Zealand. |
| 11 December | Nidaros | Steamship | Lobnitz & Co. | Renfrew | United Kingdom | For Det Forenede Dampskibs-Selskab. |
| 11 December | Peridot | Steamship | John Fullarton & Co. | Paisley | United Kingdom | For William Robertson. |
| 12 December | Alexandra | Dredger | William Simons & Co. | Renfrew | United Kingdom | For private owner. |
| 14 December | Lady Terfrida | Steam yacht | Fairfield Shipbuilding and Engineering Co. | Fairfield | United Kingdom | For Sir William George Pearce. |
| 18 December | Sultana | Steam yacht | Handren and Robins | Erie Basin, New York | United Kingdom | For Trenor Luther Park. |
| 20 December | Sard | Steamship | Scott & Co. | Bowling | United Kingdom | For William Robertson. |
| 20 December | Viceroy | Steamship | Wood, Skinner & Co. | Newcastle upon Tyne | United Kingdom | For Marquess of Londonderry. |
| 21 December | Bona | Steamship | Raylton Dixon & Co. | Middlesbrough | United Kingdom | For English and American Shipping Company. |
| 25 December | Evolution | Steam yacht | James Lenox | South Brooklyn, New York | United States | For W. M. Jackson. |
| 21 December | Heron | Steamship | Gourlay Bros. & Co. | Dundee | United Kingdom | For General Steam Navigation Company. |
| 21 December | Jarnac | Steamship | S. & H. Morton | Leith | United Kingdom | For Thomas & James Harrison. |
| 21 December | John Bright | Steamship | W. Gray & Co. Ltd. | West Hartlepool | United Kingdom | For Christopher Furness. |
| 21 December | Nizam | Cargo ship | Harland & Wolff | Belfast | United Kingdom | For Asiatic Steamship Co. |
| 21 December | Scottish Moors | Steamship | Richardson, Duck & Co. | South Stockton | United Kingdom | For W. H. Ross & Co. |
| 21 December | Singan | Steamship | Scott & Co. | Greenock | United Kingdom | For China Navigation Company (Limited). |
| 21 December | Weimar | Passenger ship | Ramage & Ferguson | Leith | United Kingdom | For James Currie & Co. |
| 21 December | Unnamed | Steamship | Robert Stephenson & Co., Limited | Hebburn | United Kingdom | For W. H. Ross & Co. |
| 23 December | County Down | Steamship | Workman, Clark & Co. | Belfast | United Kingdom | For County Steamship Company, Limited. |
| 23 December | Egret | Steamship | W. B. Thompson & Co. | Dundee | United Kingdom | For Cork Steamship Company. |
| 23 December | Ormesby | Steamship | Ropner & Son | Stockton-on-Tees | United Kingdom | For R. Roper & Co. |
| 23 December | Oswin | Steamship | T. Turnbull & Sons | Whitby | United Kingdom | For private owner. |
| 23 December | Paranagua | Steamship | Raylton Dixon & Co. | Middlesbrough | United Kingdom | For Compagnie Chargeurs Réunis. |
| 23 December | Partenope | Partenope-class torpedo cruiser | Regio Cantiere di Castellammare di Stabia | Castellammare di Stabia | Italy | For Regia Marina. |
| 24 December | Abbotshall | Steamship | John Scott & Co. | Kinghorn | United Kingdom | For Kirkcaldy and London Steamship Company. |
| 24 December | Eton | Steamship | W. Gray & Co. | West Hartlepool | United Kingdom | For Christopher Furness. |
| 24 December | Gaekwar | Cargo ship | Harland & Wolff | Belfast | United Kingdom | For T. & J. Brocklebank. |
| 24 December | Messapia | Steamship | Sunderland Shipbuilding Company | Sunderland | United Kingdom | For Puglia Steam Navigation Companhy. |
| 24 December | Mexico | Steamship | Grangemouth Dockyard Company | Grangemouth | United Kingdom | For Romano & Abaumza. |
| 24 December | Unnamed | Steamship | Wigham, Richardson & Co. | Low Walker | United Kingdom | For Chinesische Kustenfahrt Gesellschaft. |
| 24 December | Unnamed | Tanker | Palmer's Shipbuilding and Iron Company | Howdon | United Kingdom | For private owner. |
| 26 December | Baron Fyfe | Steamship | Robert Duncan & Co. | Port Glasgow | United Kingdom | For Hugh Hogarth. |
| 27 December | Dorothy | Yawl | Harry Tilbery | Slaughden | United Kingdom | For North Company of Beachmen. |
| 28 December | America | Steamship | Raylton Dixon & Co. | Middlesbrough | United Kingdom | For S. M. Kuhnle & Son. |
| 28 December | Unnamed | Steamship | C. S. Swan and Hunter | Wallsend | United Kingdom | For Mercantile Steamship Company, Limited. |
| 28 December | Unnamed | Steamship | John Readhead & Sons | South Shields | United Kingdom | For private owner. |
| 28 December | Unnamed | Steamship | Thomas & William Smith | North Shields | United Kingdom | For private owner. |
| December | Morayshire | Steamship | Hawthorn, Leslie & Co. | Hebburn | United Kingdom | For Turnbull, Martin & Co. |
| Unknown date | Agosto | Merchantman | William Pickersgill & Sons | Sunderland | United Kingdom | For La Compañía Bilbaína de Navegaçión. |
| Unknown date | Arabian Prince | Merchantman | Short Bros. | Sunderland | United Kingdom | For James Knott. |
| Unknown date | Argo | Merchantman | Osbourne, Graham & Co. | Sunderland | United Kingdom | For Finska Ångfartygs Aktiebolag. |
| Unknown date | Asagawo Maru | Merchantman | James Laing | Sunderland | United Kingdom | For Iwasaki Kiuya. |
| Unknown date | Athalie | Merchantman | Strand Slipway Company | Sunderland | United Kingdom | For Jacob Christensen. |
| Unknown date | Atrato | Steamship | R. Napier & Sons | Govan | United Kingdom | For Royal Mail Steam Packet Company. |
| Unknown date | Barrier | Merchantman | S. P. Austin & Son | Sunderland | United Kingdom | For Elder, Smith & Co. Ltd. |
| Unknown date | Bayonne | Tanker | A. & J. Inglis | Partick | United Kingdom | For Anglo-American Oil Company (Limited). |
| Unknown date | Ben Corlic | Merchantman | James Laing | Sunderland | United Kingdom | For J Morrison & Sons. |
| Unknown date | Benisaf | Merchantman | William Doxford & Sons | Sunderland | United Kingdom | For English & American Shipping Co. Ltd. |
| Unknown date | Byron | Merchantman | Joseph L. Thompson & Sons | Sunderland | United Kingdom | For Glover Bros. |
| Unknown date | Caledonia | Steamship | Joseph L. Thompson & Sons | Sunderland | United Kingdom | For International Line Steam Ship Co. Ltd. |
| Unknown date | Cambria | Steamship | Joseph L. Thompson & Sons | Sunderland | United Kingdom | For International Line Steam Ship Co. Ltd. |
| Unknown date | Camperdown | Steamship | Blumer & Company | Sunderland | United Kingdom | For Steamship Camperdown Co. Ltd., or Pinkneys Clare Nye. |
| Unknown date | Carlisle | Merchantman | Sunderland Shipbuilding Co. Ltd | Sunderland | United Kingdom | For L. R. Conner & Co. |
| Unknown date | Cheshire | Paddle steamer | Canada Works Engineering & Shipbuilding Co. | Birkenhead | United Kingdom | For Birkenhead Town Council. |
| Unknown date | City of Belfast | Merchantman | Short Brothers | Sunderland | United Kingdom | For J. S. Boyd. |
| Unknown date | Clifton | Merchantman | James Laing | Sunderland | United Kingdom | For Deddington Steamship Co. Ltd., or H. Samman & Co. |
| Unknown date | Conde Wilfredo | Merchantman | Joseph L. Thompson & Sons | Sunderland | United Kingdom | For Pinillos Saenz & Co. |
| Unknown date | County Derry | Steamship | S. P. Austin & Son | Sunderland | United Kingdom | For County Steamship Co. Ltd. |
| Unknown date | Curlip | Paddle Steamer | Samuel Richardson & Sons | Tabbara | Victoria | For private owner. |
| Unknown date | Cycle | Merchantman | Joseph L. Thompson & Sons | Sunderland | United Kingdom | For R. Nicholson & Sons. |
| Unknown date | Deddington | Collier | John Priestman & Co. | Sunderland | United Kingdom | For Deddington Steamship Co. Ltd. |
| Unknown date | Defiance | Tug | J. H. Dialogue & Sons | Camden, New Jersey | United States | For Shipowners & Merchants Tugboat Co. |
| Unknown date | Dunsley | Merchantman | Joseph L. Thompson & Sons | Sunderland | United Kingdom | For John H. Barry & Co. |
| Unknown date | Dyrafjeld | Hardangerjakt | | Stangvik | Norway | For private owner. |
| Unknown date | Edenmore | Merchantman | Bartram, Haswell & Co. | Sunderland | United Kingdom | For W. Johnston & Co. |
| Unknown date | Elena Cosulich | Merchantman | John Priestman & Co. | Sunderland | United Kingdom | For M. O. Cosulich & Co. |
| Unknown date | Elfrida | Steamship | Osbourne, Graham & Co. | Sunderland | United Kingdom | For Pyman Bell & Co. |
| Unknown date | Elfrida | Schooner | Harlan & Hollingsworth | Wilmington, Delaware | United States | For private owner. |
| Unknown date | Elisa R | Steamship | Bailey & Leetham | Hull | United Kingdom | For private owner. |
| Unknown date | Eva | Steamship | Strand Slipway Company | Sunderland | United Kingdom | For Fenwick & Co. |
| Unknown date | Fairhaven | Sternwheeler | John J. Holland | Tacoma, Washington | United States | For Pacific Navigation Company. |
| Unknown date | Fedora | Bulk carrier | Frank W. Wheeler Shipbuilding Co. | West Bay City, Michigan | United States | For Fred McBier & Associates. |
| Unknown date | Francis Hinton | Steam barge | Hanson & Scove | Manitowoc, Wisconsin | United States | For George G. Oliver. |
| Unknown date | Fulwell | Merchantman | Joseph L. Thompson & Sons | Sunderland | United Kingdom | For J Millas & Son. |
| Unknown date | Galicia | Merchantman | James Laing | Sunderland | United Kingdom | For Hamburg-Amerikanische Packetfahrt-Actien-Gesellschaft. |
| Unknown date | Gazelle | Steamship | Laird Bros. | Birkenhead | United Kingdom | For Great Western Railway. |
| Unknown date | Gemini | Merchantman | John Priestman & Co. | Sunderland | United Kingdom | For J. G. Hill. |
| Unknown date | Girgenti | Merchantman | John Blumer & Co. | Sunderland | United Kingdom | For R. M. Sloman & Co. |
| Unknown date | Glenartny | Steamship | James Laing | Sunderland | United Kingdom | For MacGregor Gow & Co. |
| Unknown date | Gloucester City | Merchanman | Joseph L. Thompson & Sons | Sunderland | United Kingdom | For Charles Hill & Sons. |
| Unknown date | Hazel Branch | Steamship | Bartram, Haswell & Co. | Sunderland | United Kingdom | For Nautilus Steam Shipping Co. Ltd. |
| Unknown date | Hirondelle | Steam yacht | Abercorn Shipbuilding Company | Paisley | United Kingdom | For private owner. |
| Unknown date | Hydra | Hydra-class ironclad | | Saint-Nazaire | France | For Royal Hellenic Navy. |
| Unknown date | Jaederen | Steamship | Grangemouth Dockyard Company | Grangemouth | United Kingdom | For Somme & Wattue. |
| Unknown date | J. D. Jones | Tug | A. C. Brown | Tottenville, New York | United States | For private owner. |
| Unknown date | John Sanderson | Steamship | Short Brothers | Sunderland | United Kingdom | For Taylor & Sanderson Steam Shipping Co. |
| Unknown date | Johnson | Merchantman | William Pickersgill & Sonns | Sunderland | United Kingdom | For R. Gordon & Co. |
| Unknown date | Jordan | Merchantman | Joseph L. Thompson & Sons | Sunderland | United Kingdom | For Mercantile Steam Navigation Co. Ltd. |
| Unknown date | Joseph John | Merchantman | William Doxford & Co. Ltd. | Sunderland | United Kingdom | For Joseph John Steamship Co. Ltd. |
| Unknown date | La France | Steamship | | Stanley Pool | Congo Free State | For Dumas, Beraud & Co. |
| Unknown date | Lochmore | Merchantman | Bartram, Haswell & Co. Ltd. | Sunderland | United Kingdom | For W. Johnston & Co. |
| Unknown date | Lynx | Steamship | Laird Bros. | Birkenhead | United Kingdom | For Great Western Railway. |
| Unknown date | Magnus Mail | Steamship | Short Brothers | Sunderland | United Kingdom | For James Westoll Line. |
| Unknown date | Mamari | Refrigerated cargo ship | William Doxford & Sons | Sunderland | United Kingdom | For Shaw, Savill & Albion Line. |
| Unknown date | Mittelweg | Merchantman | Short Brothers | Sunderland | United Kingdom | For J. H. Lorentzen & Co. |
| Unknown date | Moorish Prince | Merchantman | Short Brothers | Sunderland | United Kingdom | For James Knott. |
| Unknown date | Morrill | Steamship | Pusey and Jones | Wilmington, Delaware | United States | For United States Revenue Cutter Service. |
| Unknown date | Northern Wave | Steamship | Globe Iron Works Company | Cleveland, Ohio | United States | For Northern Steamship Co. |
| Unknown date | Northwest | Sterenwheeler | | West Kelso, Washington | United States | For Kellogg Transportation Co. |
| Unknown date | No Wonder | Sternwheeler | David Stephenson | East Portland, Oregon | United States | For Willamette Steam Mills & Lumbering Co. |
| Unknown date | Olympo | Merchantman | James Laing | Sunderland | United Kingdom | For The Plate Steamship Co. Ltd., or Gellatly Hankey S. |
| Unknown date | Oscar T. Flint | Bulk carrier | Simon Langell | St. Clair, Michigan | United States | For Eagle Transportation Co. |
| Unknown date | Palentino | Merchantman | Robert Thompson & Sons | Sunderland | United Kingdom | For M. M. de Arrotegui. |
| Unknown date | Paliki | Steamship | John Blumer & Company | Sunderland | United Kingdom | For P. G. Cicellis. |
| Unknown date | Quickstep | Merchantman | John Priestman & Co. | Sunderland | United Kingdom | For J. G. Hill. |
| Unknown date | Raven | Steam yacht | T. B. Seath & Co. | Rutherglen | United Kingdom | For Ullswater Steam Navigation Company. |
| Unknown date | Regulus | Merchantman | Osbourne, Graham & Co. | Sunderland | United Kingdom | For Finska Ångfartygs Aktiebolag. |
| Unknown date | Ricardo | Merchantman | William Pickersgill & Sons | Sunderland | United Kingdom | For R. W. Jones & Co. |
| Unknown date | Roma | Steamship | Joseph L. Thompson & Sons | Sunderland | United Kingdom | For Rowland & Marwood. |
| Unknown date | Rubinstein | Merchantman | Bartram, Haswell & Co. | Sunderland | United Kingdom | For Jenneson, Taylor & Co. |
| Unknown date | Rudesheimer | Steamship | Sunderland Shipbuilding Co. Ltd. | Sunderland | United Kingdom | For Deutsche Dampfschiffahrts-Gesellschaft Hansa. |
| Unknown date | Saint Marnock | Merchantman | James Laing | Sunderland | United Kingdom | For British & Foreign Steamship Co. Ltd. |
| Unknown date | Saint Thorwald | Merchantman | S. P. Austin & Son | Sunderland | United Kingdom | For S. P. Austin & Son or Elders, Smith & Co. Ltd. |
| Unknown date | Sarmatia | Merchantman | William Doxford & Sons | Sunderland | United Kingdom | For International Line Steamship Co. Ltd. |
| Unknown date | Siggen | Merchantman | John Blumer & Co. | Sunderland | United Kingdom | For Harloff & Rødseth. |
| Unknown date | Snilesworth | Merchantman | Short Brothers | Sunderland | United Kingdom | For J. Tully. |
| Unknown date | Somerton | Steamship | Osbourne, Graham & Co. | Sunderland | United Kingdom | For The Deddington Steamship Co. Ltd. |
| Unknown date | Southery | Steamship | Robert Thompson & Sons | Sunderland | United Kingdom | For Culliford & Clark. |
| Unknown date | Specialist | Merchantman | Strand Slipway Co. | Sunderland | United Kingdom | For Angier Shipping Co. |
| Unknown date | State of Washington | Sternwheeler | John J. Holland | Tacoma, Washington | United States | For La Conner Trading and Transportation Company. |
| Unknown date | Tecumseh | Schooner | | Bath, Maine | United States | For private owner. |
| Unknown date | Thomas Anderson | Merchantman | Short Brothers | Sunderland | United Kingdom | For Anderson Horan. |
| Unknown date | Thornaby | Steamship | Ropner & Son | Stockton-on-Tees | United Kingdom | For R. Ropner & Co. |
| Unknown date | Trafalgar | Merchantman | John Blumer & Co. | Sunderland | United Kingdom | For Single Ship Trafalgar Co Ltd. |
| Unknown date | Truro City | Steamship | Sunderland Shipbuilding Co. Ltd | Sunderland | United Kingdom | For C. Furness. |
| Unknown date | Typhoon | Steamboat | | Portland, Oregon | United States | For J. B. Montgomery. |
| Unknown date | Umvolosi | Merchantman | James Laing | Sunderland | United Kingdom | For Bullard, King & Co. |
| Unknown date | Urbino | Merchantman | Robert Thompson & Sons | Sunderland | United Kingdom | For T. Wilson, Sons & Co. Ltd. |
| Unknown date | Urpeth | Merchantman | S. P. Austin & Son | Sunderland | United Kingdom | For J. Fenwick & Son. |
| Unknown date | Verne Swain | Steamboat | David Swain | Stillwater, Minnesota | United States | For Acme Steam Packet Company. |
| Unknown date | Vesta | Merchantman | S. P. Austin & Son | Sunderland | United Kingdom | For Martin G. Amsinck. |
| Unknown date | Washington | Merchantman | Strand Slipway Company | Sunderland | United Kingdom | For Fenwick & Co. |
| Unknown date | Condor | Steam schooner | Forges et Chantiers de la Méditerranée | Le Havre | France | For Chilean Navy |
| Unknown date | Huemul | Steam schooner | Forges et Chantiers de la Méditerranée | Le Havre | France | For Chilean Navy |
| Unknown date | Whitby | Merchantman | Joseph L. Thompson & Sons | Sunderland | United Kingdom | For James Gray & Co. |
| Unknown date | White Jacket | Steamship | Joseph L. Thompson & Sons | Sunderland | United Kingdom | For White Jacket Steamship Co. Ltd. |
| Unknown date | Wisp | Steam launch | W. Allsup & Sons Ltd. | Preston | United Kingdom | For G. R. Allsup. |
| Unknown date | Wittekind | Merchantman | Sunderland Shipbuilding Co. Ltd | Sunderland | United Kingdom | For Lange Bros. |
| Unknown date | Yumari | Steamship | Delaware River Iron Ship Building and Engine Works | Chester, Pennsylvania | United States | For private owner. |
| Unknown date | Zweena | Steamship | John Blumer & Co | Sunderland | United Kingdom | For Mersey Steamship Co. Ltd. |
