= Curlew-class torpedo gunboat =

Royal Navy gunboat (1886–1906)

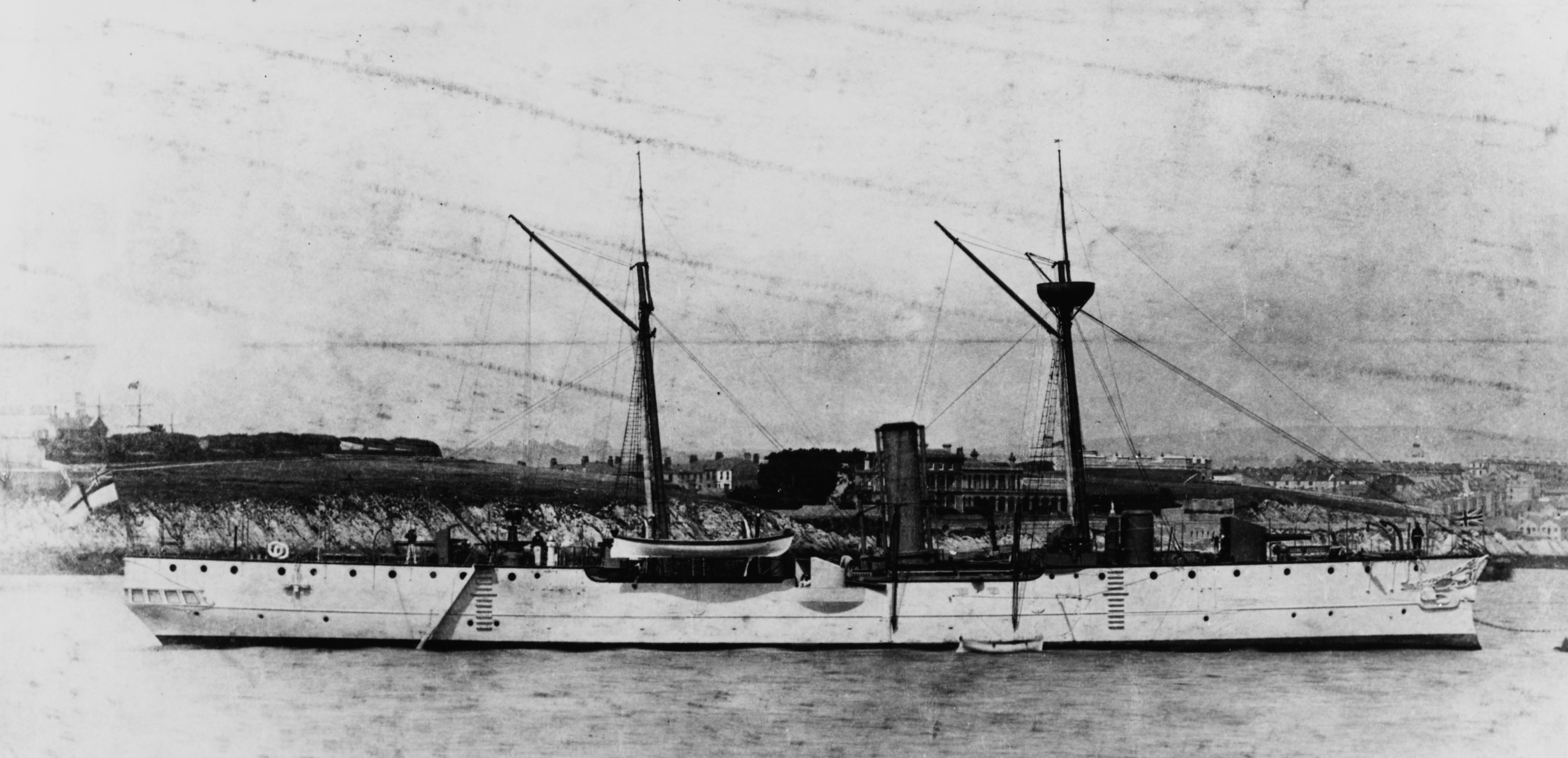
- Lead of her class HMS Curlew

Class overview
- Name: Curlew class
- Builders: Devonport Royal Dockyard
- Operators: Royal Navy
- Built: 1888–1889
- In commission: 1890–1905
- Completed: 2
- Retired: 2

General characteristics
- Type: Torpedo gunboat; Sloop; Gunvessel
- Displacement: 950 long tons (965 t)
- Length: 195 ft (59 m) lbp; 233.0 ft (71.02 m) loa
- Beam: 28 ft (8.5 m)
- Draught: 10.5 ft (3.2 m)
- Propulsion: 4 boilers; 2 steam engines; 2 propellers
- Speed: 14.5 knots (26.9 km/h; 16.7 mph)
- Complement: 46
- Armament: 1 × 6 in (15 cm) BLR; 3 × 5 in (13 cm) BLR; 1 × torpedo tube; 2 × torpedo carriages; 7 × machine guns

The Curlew-class torpedo gunboat consisted of two "gun and torpedo vessels" operated by the Royal Navy between 1886 and 1906. Designed to be a torpedo cruiser the size of a gunvessel, the ships had a miserable career as the design was too slow and uneconomical for intended use. Regardless, the class served as the basis for further designs by the Royal Navy due to their novel roles. Due to their unique design, the ships have also been referred to as sloops or gunvessels.

== Development and design ==
During the early 1880s, the Royal Navy worked to develop a new type of warship, known as the torpedo cruiser. Later designated as third-class cruisers, these vessels had the speed, size, and maneuverability to serve as a vanguard for ocean-going fleets of ironclads. In combat, doctrine called for the cruisers to sail ahead and engage enemy vessels, primarily torpedo boats, with their guns and underwater torpedo tubes. After initial iterations of designs, the Navy was interested in making the design as small as possible, allowing the ships to be cheaper than the torpedo cruisers. After successes with the Scout-class torpedo cruisers and the smaller Satellite and Nymphe-class sloops, plans were made to retain the combat capabilities of a cruiser on a ship the size of a gunvessel (gunboat).

Named the Curlew class, the ships' primarily armament consisted of a 6 in (15 cm) breach loading rifle (BLR) and a single torpedo tube mounted at the bow, with two torpedo carriages mounted on the fore and aft to engage targets on either side of the ship. In addition, the ships were further fitted with three 5 in (13 cm) BLR mounts: one on the aft, and one on each side of the ship, along with seven machine guns to ward off torpedo boats. They displaced 950 long tons (970 t), were 195 feet (59 m) long between perpendiculars, had a beam of 28 feet (8.5 m), a draught of 10.5 feet (3.2 m), and manned by a crew of 46. Propelled by four boilers feeding two propellers created 1,500 indicated horsepower (1,100 kW) and gave the vessels a maximum speed of 14.5 knots (26.9 km/h; 16.7 mph). While the design resembled that of older gunvessels, these ships notably were made of steel and lacked sailing rigs.

Due to the design blending the features of other types of ships, the ships have been referred to as sloops, torpedo gunboats, gunvessels, and "gun and torpedo vessels".

== Service history ==
The two ships of the class, HMS Curlew and HMS Landrail, were laid down in 1885 at Devonport Dockyard. However, upon entering service, they quickly proved redundant. The ships were intended to serve as fleet torpedo cruisers or operate independently as gunboats. In practice, they were too small and slow to function effectively with a fleet, while their complexity and cost made them unsuitable as standalone gunboats. Despite their failures, the design was later enlarged and modified to create the Barracouta and Barham third class cruisers. The concept behind the Curlews would later evolve into the torpedo gunboat and, eventually, the destroyer.

== Ships ==
Name	Builder	Laid down	Launched	Completed	Out of Service	Ref
Curlew	Devonport	1 January 1885	23 October 1885	22 July 1886	Broken up, 1906	
Landrail	Devonport	1 January 1885	19 January 1886	10 March 1887	Sunk as target, 10 April 1906	
