= SS Ajax (1889) =

Danish cargo ship

- Ajax.

History
- Name: (United Kingdom) SS Antiquary (1889–1901); (Denmark) SS Ajax (1901–1917)
- Owner: Torm Dampskibselsskabet
- Port of registry: (United Kingdom) Newcastle
- Builder: W. Dobson & Co.
- Yard number: 32
- Launched: 30 October 1889
- Completed: 1889
- Identification: 95216
- Fate: Torpedoed and sunk 25 December 1917

General characteristics
- Type: Cargo ship
- Tonnage: 1,018 GRT
- Length: 64 metres (210 ft 0 in)
- Beam: 9.2 metres (30 ft 2 in)
- Depth: 5 metres (16 ft 5 in)
- Installed power: Triple expansion steam engine
- Propulsion: Screw propeller

The SS Ajax was a Danish cargo ship that was torpedoed by U-104 in the Bay of Biscay off Audierne, France, while she was travelling from Bilbao, Spain, to Cardiff, Wales, United Kingdom.

== Construction ==
SS Ajax was constructed in 1889 with yard no. 32 at the W. Dobson & Co. shipyard in Newcastle, United Kingdom. She was launched on 30 October 1889 and completed in December. She sailed under the name SS Antiquary under the British flag until she was sold in 1901 to Torm Dampskibselsskabet in Copenhagen, Denmark.

The ship was 64 metres (210 ft 0 in) long, with a beam of 9.2 metres (30 ft 2 in). She had a depth of 5 metres (16 ft 5 in). The ship was assessed at 1,018 GRT. She had a triple expansion steam engine driving a single screw propeller. The engine was rated at 111 nhp.

== Sinking ==
On 25 December 1917, Ajax was on a voyage in a convoy from Bilbao, Spain, to Cardiff, Wales. At 0200 hrs the Ajax was struck by one torpedo from U-104 off Audierne, France (47°53′N 4°32′W). The torpedo struck in the engine room which made the boilers explode a few seconds later and sent the ship to the bottom of the Bay in just 30 seconds. The survivors reached land in a badly damaged life boat. At the time of her sinking the Ajax was carrying a cargo of iron ore. The ship sank to a depth of over 58 metres (190 ft), along with its cargo and the eleven sailors.^{[Note 1]}

== Wreck ==
The wreck sits 54 to 58 metres (177 to 190 ft) deep at 47°53′N 4°32′W.
