= SS Auguste Helmerich =

German cargo ship

History
- Name: Auguste Helmerich
- Port of registry: (German Empire) Lübeck, Germany
- Builder: Koch Henry A.G.
- Launched: March 1889
- Completed: 1889
- Fate: Sank after a collision 30 September 1919

General characteristics
- Type: Cargo ship
- Tonnage: 842 GRT
- Length: 63 m (206 ft 8 in)
- Beam: 9.2 m (30 ft 2 in)

SS Auguste Helmerich was a German cargo ship that collided with SS Normandiet off Dalarö (east coast of Öland) while on a voyage from Kotka, Finland, to Hamburg, Germany with a cargo of wood.

== Construction ==
Auguste Helmerich was constructed in 1889 at the Koch Henry A.G. shipyard in Lübeck, Germany. She was completed in 1889. The ship was 63 metres (206 ft 8 in) long and had a beam of 9.2 metres (30 ft 2 in). The ship was assessed at 842 gross register tons (GRT).

== Sinking ==
On 30 September 1919, Auguste Helmerich was on a voyage from Kotka, Finland, to Hamburg, Germany with a cargo of wood when she collided with SS Normandiet off Dalarö. The ship foundered with no casualties.

== Wreck ==
The wreck was discovered in 2000 and was found totally intact (except for a hole from the collision) in 60 metres (196 ft 10 in) of water.
