= Teutonic-class ocean liner =

1889–1921 British ocean liners

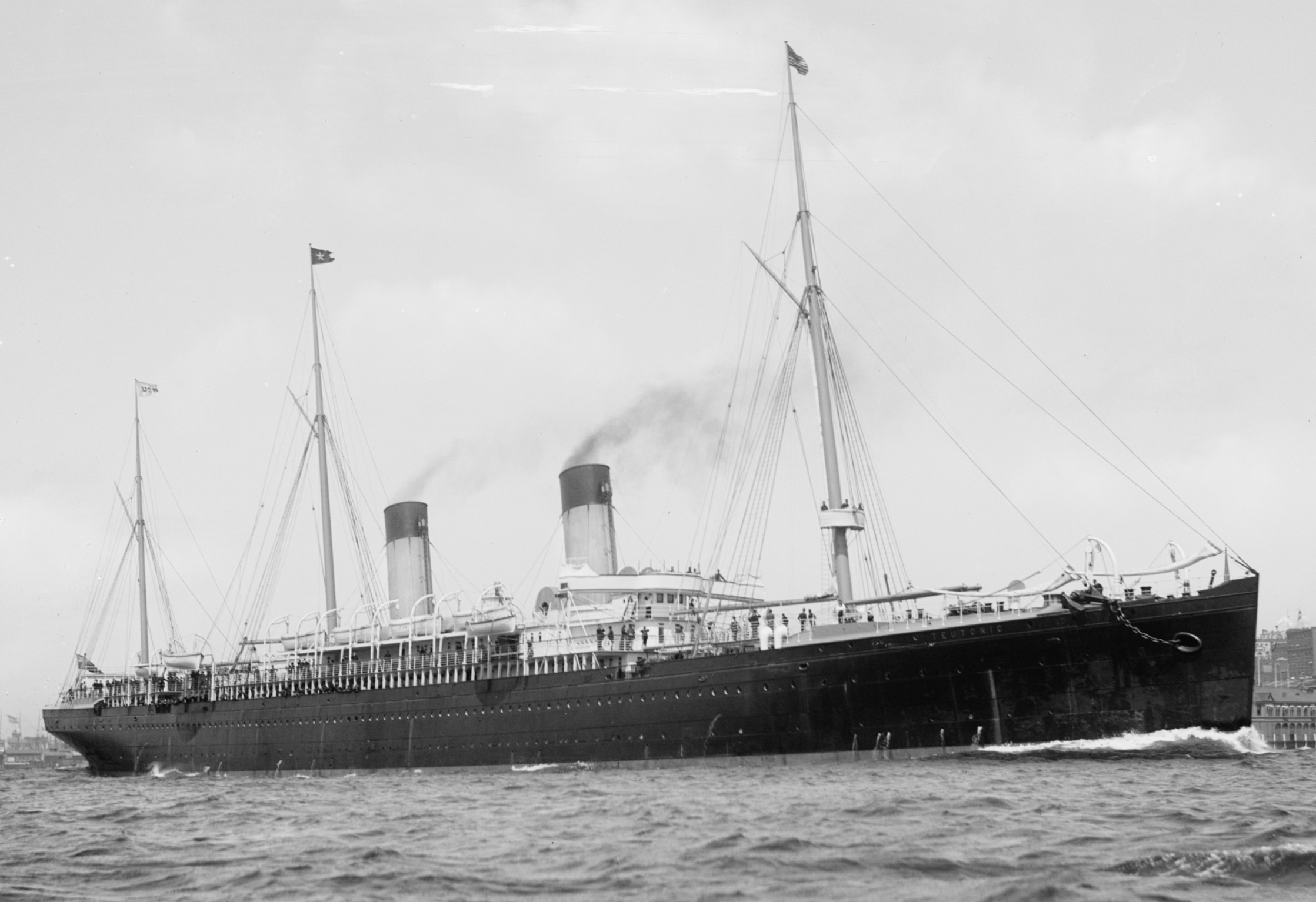
- RMS Teutonic, the first ship of the class

Class overview
- Name: Teutonic class
- Builders: Harland and Wolff
- Operators: White Star Line
- Preceded by: Coptic class
- Succeeded by: Naronic class
- In service: 1889–1921
- Planned: 2
- Completed: 2
- Scrapped: 2

General characteristics
- Type: Ocean liner
- Tonnage: 9,984 – 9,965 gross register tons
- Length: 582 ft (177 m)
- Beam: 57.7 ft 7 in (17.76 m)
- Propulsion: Two triple expansion engines powering two propellers
- Speed: 20 knots (37 km/h; 23 mph) service speed
- Capacity: 1,490 passengers: 300 First Class; 190 Second Class; 1,000 Third Class

The Teutonic-class ocean liners were a pair of passenger liners named the Teutonic and Majestic. The ships were built by Harland & Wolff shipyard for the White Star Line, specifically for the White Star Line's transatlantic service route. They are also renowned as revolutionary for the time because their main propulsion were propellers instead of square-rigged sails.

== Background ==
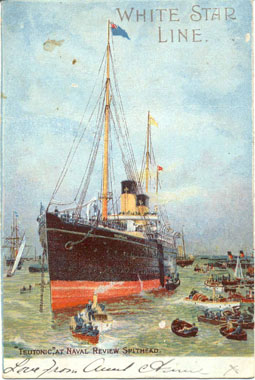
Teutonic as seen in the Spithead Naval Review

In the late 1880s competition for the Blue Riband, the award for the fastest Atlantic crossing, was fierce amongst the top steamship lines, and White Star decided to order two ships from Harland and Wolff that would be capable of an average Atlantic crossing speed of 20 knots (37 km/h; 23 mph). Construction of Teutonic and Majestic began in 1887. White Star had sought to fund the construction of both Majestic and Teutonic through the British government, a proposal which was accepted with the stipulation that the Royal Navy would have access to the two liners in a time of war.* Together, the two new ships replaced the aging SS Baltic and the SS Republic, which had both been in service with White Star since 1872. They participated in the Spithead Naval Review on 5 and 6 August, in conjunction with the state visit of Kaiser Wilhelm II.

== Features ==
The Teutonic-class ocean liners were both known as the first modern liners because of their modifications to passenger accommodation. Whereas all of White Star's previous liners had only carried two classes of passengers (Saloon and Steerage), Teutonic and Majestic introduced changes to that paradigm to include a middle class and improved accommodation. Unlike the previous White Star Liners, the Teutonic and Majestic used propellers instead of square-rigged sails as the ship's main propulsion. They were also the last ships of the White Star Line to compete for the Blue Riband.

== Careers ==
=== Teutonic ===
During the first 18 years of service, both Teutonic and Majestic, along with their older cousins Britannic and Germanic sailed on the route from their home port of Liverpool to New York City. Once passengers were disbursed at either the White Star Line pier in New York or the immigration centre at Castle Garden, and later on Ellis Island, the ship would be prepared for her return voyage. Transatlantic races between the Teutonic and liner City of New York were common in the 19th century. On 14 August 1890, the Teutonic beat the City of New York by over three hours, and broke the ocean record by coming from Queenstown in 5 days, 19 hours, and 5 minutes, and breaking the record by 13 minutes.

In 1897 Teutonic reassumed her military role for a review commemorating Victoria's 60th anniversary. During the Second Boer War in 1900, she served as a troop transport. In 1901, Teutonic encountered a rogue wave, which washed two lookouts out of the crows nest who survived. In 1905, the Teutonic was in New York Harbor when a fire (which started in the electrical room) broke out which threatened the ship. The firemen managed to control the situation and the fire was put out. In 1907 Teutonic, along with Majestic, was transferred to White Star's new 'Express Service' between Southampton and New York. In 1911, the ship was replaced in the White Star lineup by the new Olympic and transferred to the Dominion Line for Canadian service. By 1913 Teutonic's age meant that she no longer attracted the top class passengers, and so was refitted to carry only second and third class passengers. In October 1913 the ship narrowly avoided the same fate as Titanic when, at 172 miles (277 km) east of Belle Isle off the Newfoundland coast, she ran so close to an iceberg that she avoided collision only by reversing her engines and putting the helm hard aport.

In 1914, with the start of World War I, Teutonic became an armed merchant cruiser once again, being commissioned into the 10th Cruiser Squadron. In 1916, she was refitted with 6-inch guns, and served as a convoy escort ship as well as being used for troop transport. She was scrapped at Emden in 1921.

=== Majestic ===
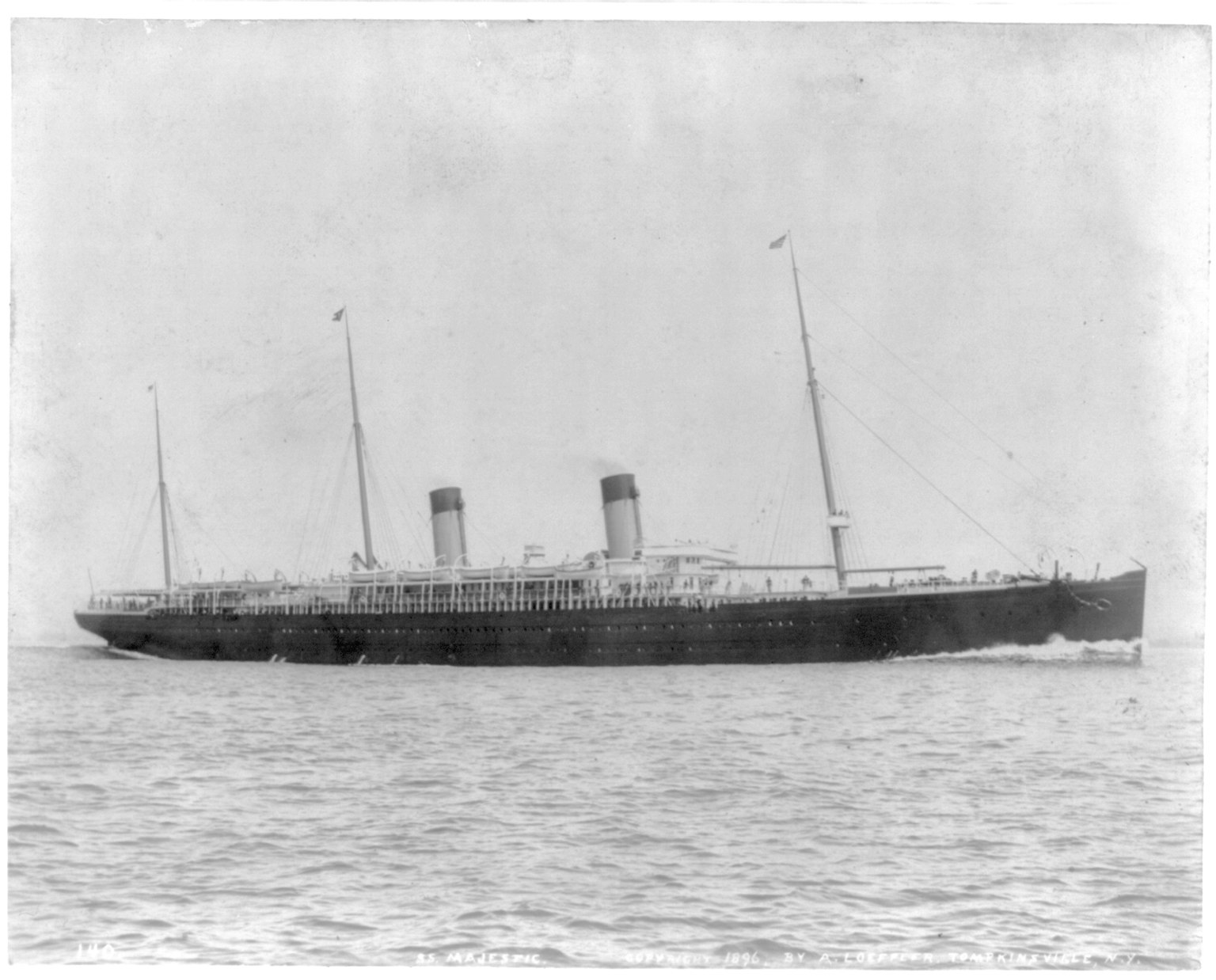
RMS Majestic at sea

On 2 April 1890, Majestic left Liverpool on her maiden voyage to New York City. There was a strong desire among the White Star management to regain the coveted Blue Riband, the award for the fastest crossing of the Atlantic, from Paris, France. The Majestic failed, but eventually achieved the goal on a westbound voyage between 30 July and 5 August 1891, with an average speed of 20.1 knots (37.2 km/h; 23.1 mph). Majestic held the honour for a mere two weeks, as Teutonic completed a crossing on 19 August with a speed of 20.35 knots (37.69 km/h; 23.42 mph). City of Paris regained the Blue Riband a year later.

In 1895, Majestic was captained by Captain Edward Smith, who commanded her for nine years. When the Boer War started in 1899, Smith and Majestic were called upon to transport troops to Cape Colony. Two trips were made to South Africa, one in December 1899 and one in February 1900, both without incident. Charles Lightoller served as a deck officer under Smith during this period. In 1902–1903, the ship underwent a refit, which included updates to much of her passenger accommodations, new boilers, and taller twin funnels, after which she returned to the Liverpool–New York run. When Titanic entered service in April 1912, Majestic was retired from White Star's New York service, biding her time at Birkenhead's Bidston Dock. When Titanic was lost on her maiden voyage, Majestic was returned to service in her former role. She was scrapped on 5 May 1914.

== Gallery ==
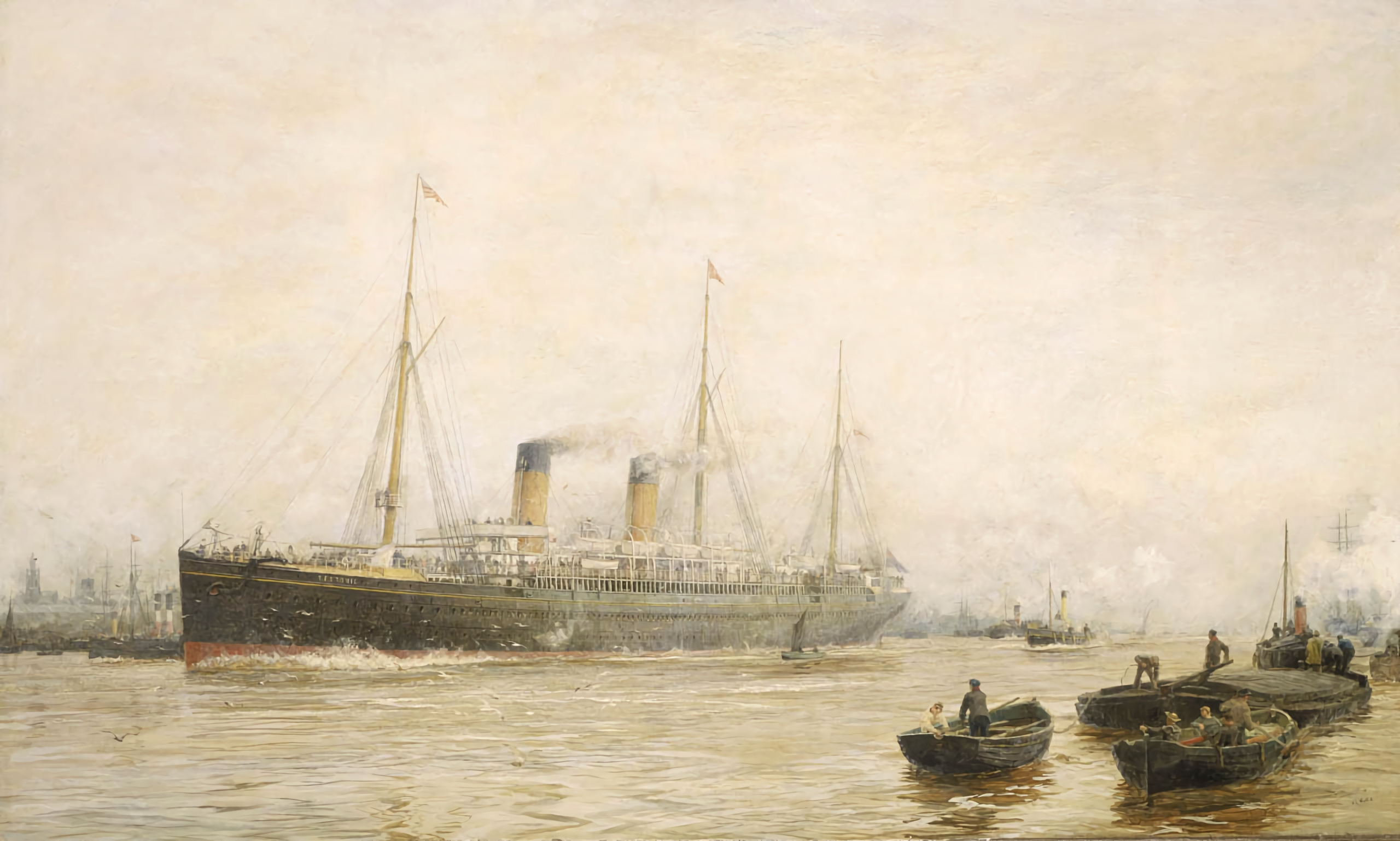
Illustration of Teutonic leaving Liverpool

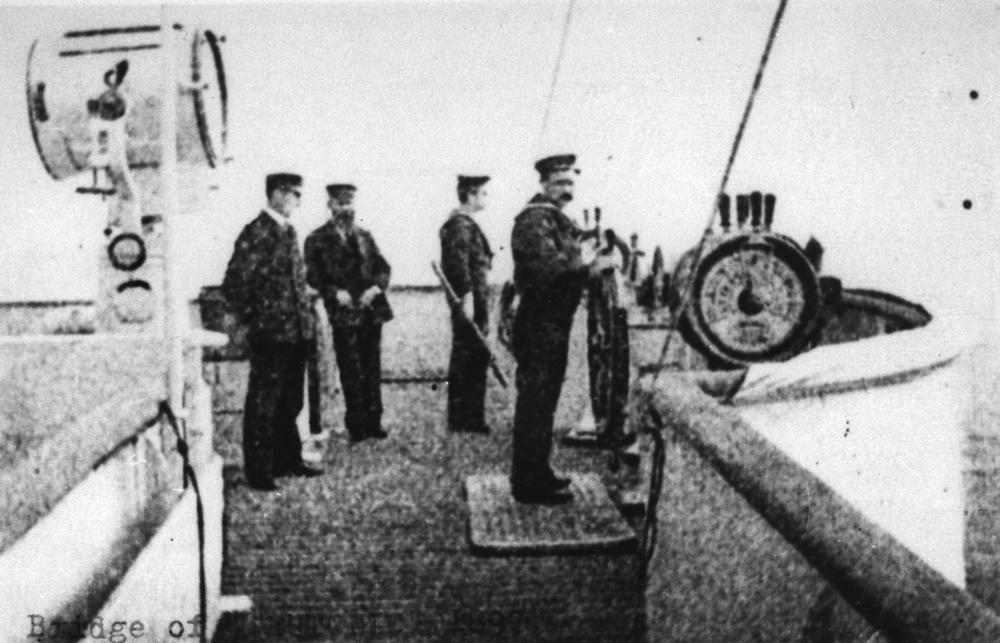
The bridge of Teutonic

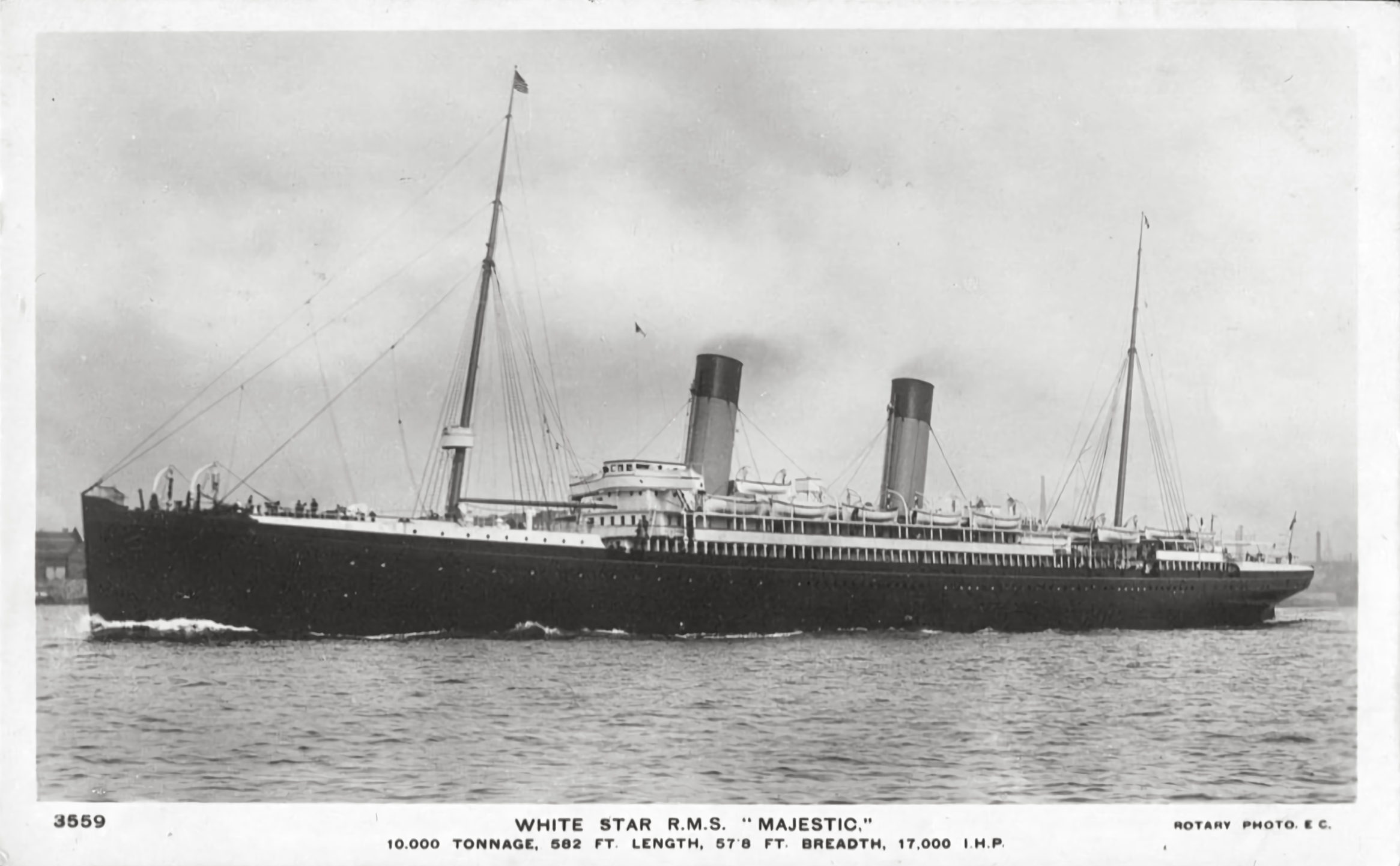
Majestic after her 1902 refit

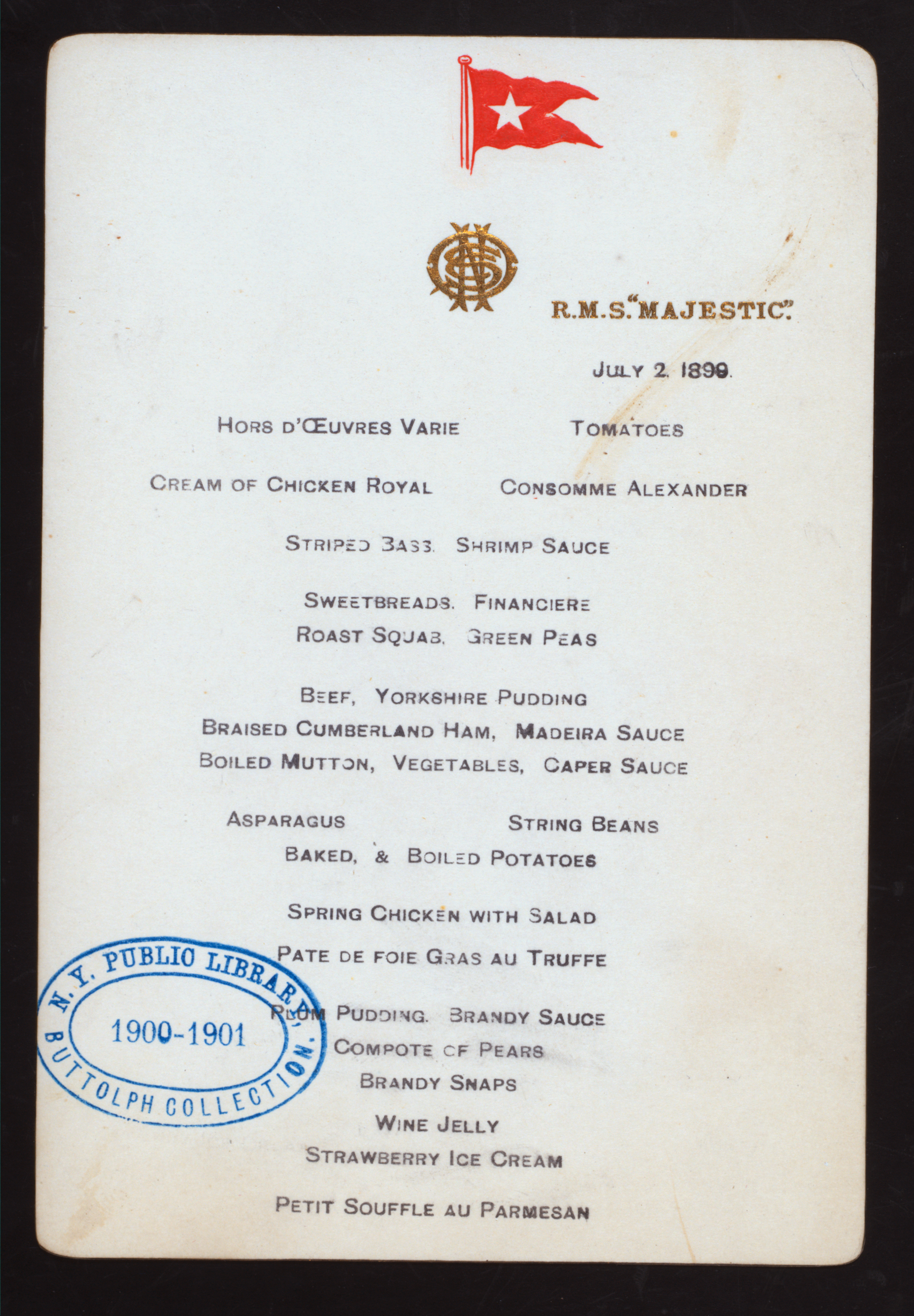
Majestic's dinner menu
