= SS Oscar T. Flint =

American wooden steam barge

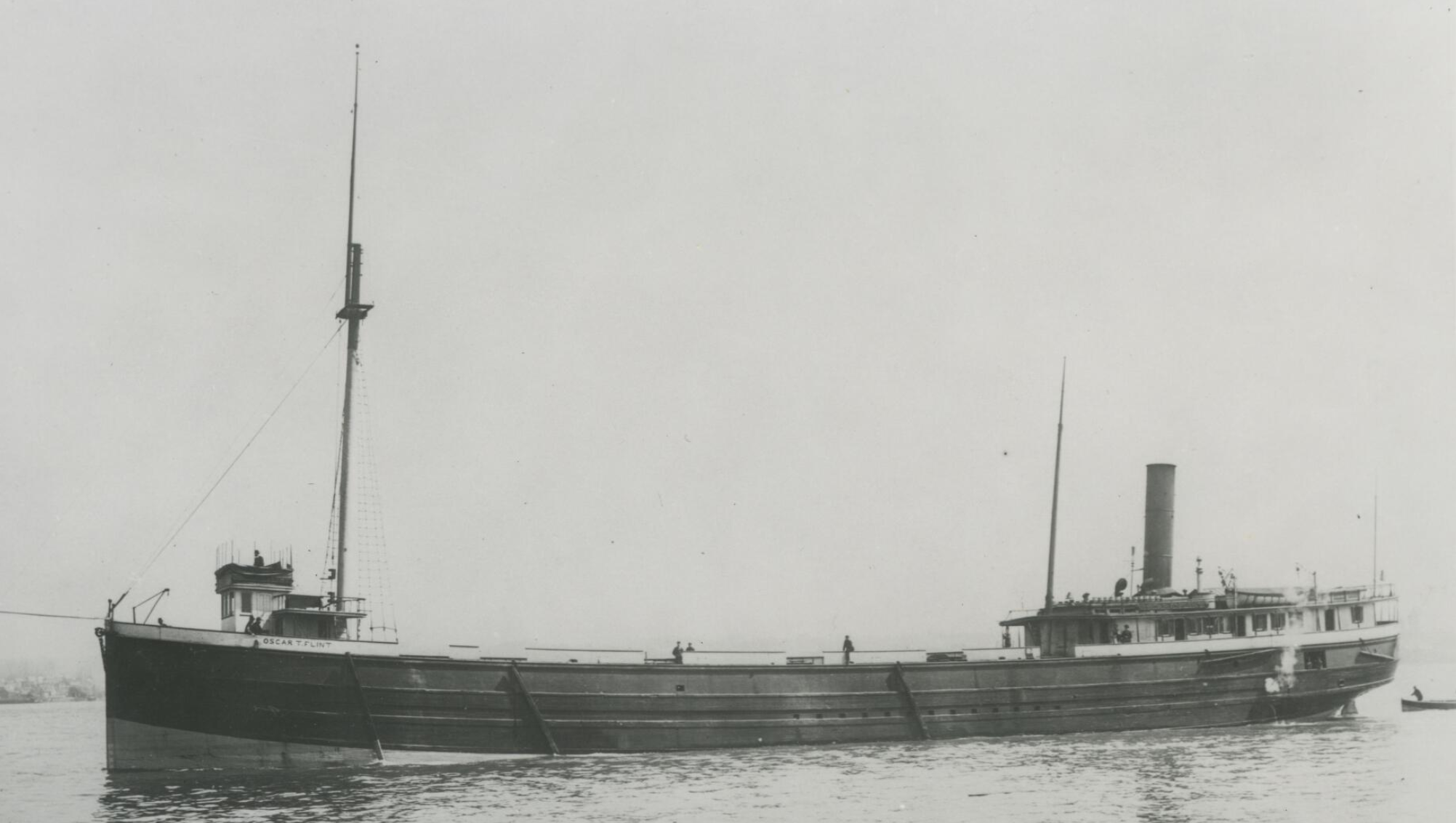

History

United States
- Name: Oscar T. Flint
- Owner: Eagle Transportation Co.; later various owners
- Builder: Simon Langell
- Launched: 1889
- Completed: 1889
- Identification: Official number 155165
- Fate: Caught fire and burned to the waterline; sank 25 November 1909

General characteristics
- Type: Wooden steam barge / bulk freighter
- Tonnage: 824 GRT (as commonly reported)
- Length: 218 ft (66 m)
- Beam: 37 ft (11 m)
- Depth: 14 ft (4.3 m)
- Installed power: 500 hp (370 kW), 2 cylinders, 1 boiler
- Propulsion: Fore-and-aft compound steam engine, single screw
- Capacity: Limestone; salt; bulk cargoes (coal, ore, grain in service)
- Notes: Launched May 1889 at St. Clair, Michigan; rebuilt and remeasured several times (1896 remeasure to larger tonnage; 1902 rebuilt back to bulk freighter).

Oscar T. Flint was a wooden Great Lakes bulk freighter (originally built as a steam barge) launched in 1889 at St. Clair, Michigan by builder Simon Langell. She carried bulk cargoes such as limestone and salt and served across the Great Lakes until she caught fire and burned to the waterline off Thunder Bay, Lake Huron, on 25 November 1909, becoming a total loss.

The wreck lies in relatively shallow water and is a recreational dive site; portions of the hull and some cargo remain on the lakebed.

== Description ==
Oscar T. Flint was launched in May 1889 at St. Clair, Michigan by shipbuilder Simon Langell. She was originally built as a wooden steambarge/bulk freighter with a fore-and-aft compound steam engine and one firebox boiler. Contemporary records list her principal dimensions as about 218 ft (66 m) length, 37 ft (11 m) beam and 14 ft (4.3 m) depth, with a gross register tonnage of approximately 823–824. Her engine was commonly reported at about 500 horsepower (370 kW).

Throughout her career the vessel was rebuilt and remeasured several times (notably remeasured and fitted as a two-deck vessel in 1896 with a larger GRT, then rebuilt again in 1902 returning her to bulk freighter form). She traded in lumber, coal, ore, grain and later bulk stone and salt under several owners and home ports during her service life.

== Final voyage and loss ==
On 25 November 1909, shortly after departing Alpena, Michigan, bound with a cargo of limestone and approximately 500 barrels of salt, Oscar T. Flint caught fire. The blaze burned the vessel to the waterline and she was declared a total loss about four miles east of the Thunder Bay River mouth off Thunder Bay Island in Lake Huron. Attempts to save the vessel failed and she settled on the lakebed; her enrollment was later surrendered (official enrollment surrender recorded in December 1909).

== Wreck site ==
The wreck of Oscar T. Flint rests on a sandy lakebed in relatively shallow water. NOAA lists the wreck position as 45°01.568′N 83°20.843′W and a depth of about 30 ft; the site includes much of the hull (except the bow) and some of the limestone cargo still present on the bottom. The anchors and windlass visible at the bow reportedly originated from the wreck of the schooner Lucinda Van Valkenburg and were later placed at the Flint site.

== See also ==
- List of shipwrecks in the Thunder Bay National Marine Sanctuary
- List of shipwrecks in the Great Lakes
