= USS Challenge (ID-1015) =

Tugboat of the United States Navy

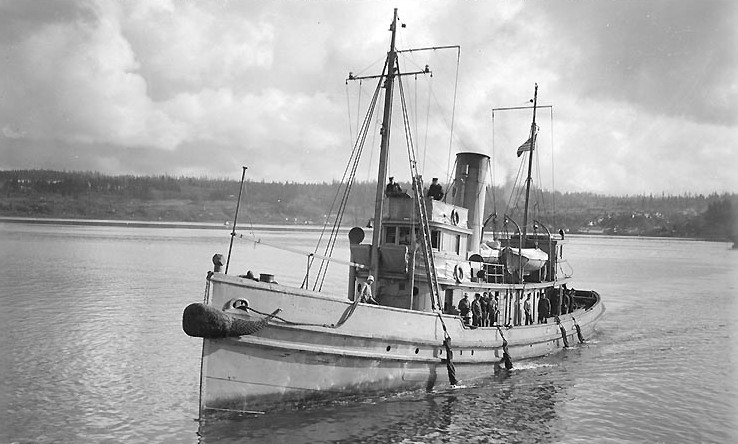
- USS Challenge (AT-59) Off the Puget Sound Navy Yard, Bremerton, Washington, on 14 February 1921.

History
- Name: Defiance
- Builder: J. H. Dialogue and Sons, Camden, New Jersey
- Completed: 1899
- Fate: Commandeered by United States Navy 13 June 1918

United States
- Name: USS Defiance
- Acquired: 13 June 1918
- Commissioned: 29 July 1918
- Renamed: USS Challenge, 15 August 1918
- Identification: Hull number: SP-1015
- Decommissioned: 13 May 1922
- Recommissioned: 21 February 1925
- Decommissioned: 2 December 1940
- In service: 2 December 1940
- Out of service: 16 October 1946
- Reclassified: AT-59, 21 February 1925; YT-126 (Yard Tug), 31 January 1936; YTM-126 (Medium Harbor Tug), 13 April 1944
- Fate: Transferred to the Maritime Commission for disposal, 16 October 1946

General characteristics
- Type: Tug
- Displacement: 246 long tons (250 t)
- Length: 122 ft (37 m)
- Beam: 22 ft 2 in (6.76 m)
- Draft: 12 ft 6 in (3.81 m)
- Propulsion: 1 × oil-burning steam engine, 750 shp (559 kW); 1 × auxiliary engine; 1 shaft
- Speed: 14 knots (26 km/h; 16 mph)
- Complement: 31
- Armament: 2 × 3-pounder guns

USS Challenge (SP-1015/AT-59/YT-126/YTM-126) was a commercial tugboat the operated primarily on the United States West Coast. The vessel was acquired by the United States Navy for service in World War I, and remained available for duty during World War II. Constructed in 1899 as the tugboat Defiance, the vessel was commandeered by the Navy on 29 July 1918 as USS Defiance. The vessel was renamed USS Challenge on 15 August 1918. and served until laid up for disposal in 1946.

== Description ==
Challenge measured 122 feet (37 m) long with a beam of 22 ft 2 in (6.76 m), a draft of 12 ft 6 in (3.81 m) and a displacement of 246 long tons (250 t). (Note: Navsource has the length of the ship at 124 ft (38 m), a draft of 19 ft 7 in (5.97 m) and the displacement as 346 long tons (352 t).) The tugboat was powered by an oil-burning steam engine turning a single propeller creating 750 shaft horsepower (560 kW) and giving the ship a maximum speed of 14 knots (26 km/h; 16 mph). The vessel was also equipped with an auxiliary engine. The ship had a complement of 31 personnel and in military service, was armed with two 3-pounder guns.

== Construction and career ==
The tugboat was built in 1889 by J. H. Dialogue and Sons, Camden, New Jersey, and named Defiance. The vessel was taken to the United States West Coast and operated by Shipowners & Merchants Tugboat Co., of San Francisco, California. Defiance was commandeered by the United States Navy on 13 June 1918, and outfitted at Mare Island Navy Yard after being delivered on 24 June.

The tugboat was commissioned as USS Defiance (SP-1015) on 29 July 1918 but was renamed Challenge on 15 August. Challenge towed oil barges between California and Mexico until 31 May 1920, when she arrived at Bremerton, Washington after being reassigned to the 13th Naval District. She served as a harbor tug at Puget Sound Navy Yard until being decommissioned on 13 May 1922 and laid up in reserve.

The ship was laid up until recommissioned and reclassified AT-59 on 21 February 1925, and resumed duty as a yard tug at Puget Sound. On 31 January 1936, she was reclassified YT-126, and on 2 December 1940, decommissioned and placed "in service". Challenge was reclassified YTM-126 on 13 April 1944 and on 16 October 1946, transferred to the Maritime Commission for disposal. The vessel was sold to Puget Sound Tug & Barge Co., of Seattle, Washington.
