= Barham-class cruiser =

Royal Navy ship class (1890–1914)

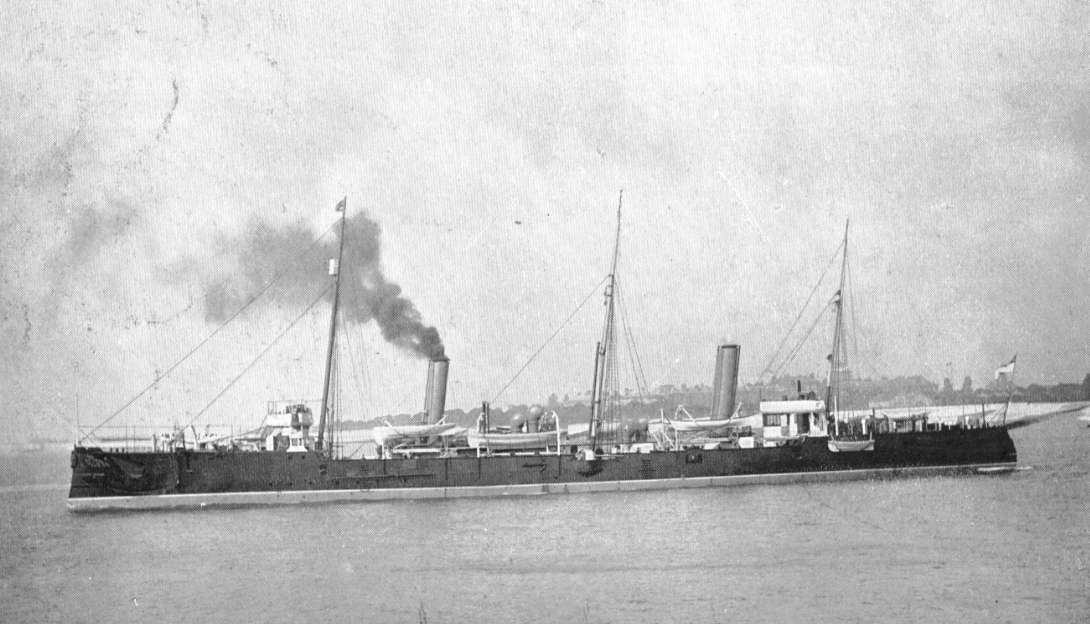
- Bellona in 1890

Class overview
- Name: Barham class
- Builders: Portsmouth Drydock; Hawthorn
- Operators: Royal Navy
- Preceded by: Barracouta class
- Succeeded by: none
- Built: 1888–1891
- In commission: 1890–1914
- Completed: 2
- Retired: 2

General characteristics
- Type: Torpedo cruiser
- Displacement: 1,800 long tons (1,830 t)
- Length: 280 ft 0 in (85.34 m) lbp
- Beam: 35 ft 0 in (10.67 m)
- Draught: 4.04 m (13 ft 3 in)
- Propulsion: 4 boilers; 2 steam engines; 2 propellers
- Speed: 1890: 19 knots (35 km/h; 22 mph); 1899: 18.5 knots (34.3 km/h; 21.3 mph)
- Complement: 170
- Armament: 6 × 4.7 in (120 mm) QF guns; 4 × 3-pounder QF gun; 2 × machine guns; 2 × underwater torpedo tubes
- Armour: 1–2 in (2.5–5.1 cm) deck; 2 inches (5.1 cm) gun shields

The Barham-class cruiser was a series of two third-class cruisers operated by the Royal Navy between 1890 and 1914. Designed as a high-speed variant of the Barracouta-class cruiser for service in the Mediterranean and British waters, flaws in their boiler design led to frequent breakdowns and the abandonment of their original purpose. Instead, the two ships were reclassified as dispatch vessels and were eventually broken up after two decades of service.

== Development and design ==
During the early 1880s, the Royal Navy worked to develop a new type of warship, known as the torpedo cruiser. Later designated as third-class cruisers, these vessels had the speed, size, and maneuverability to serve as a vanguard for ocean-going fleets of ironclads. In combat, doctrine called for the cruisers to sail ahead and engage enemy vessels, primarily torpedo boats, with their guns and underwater Torpedo tubes. After several iterations of designs, the Navy was concerned that the cruisers were too slow to serve their purpose in an engagement. One attempt to solve this issue was with the launching of the four Barracouta-class cruisers in 1888, themselves enlarged and faster versions of the torpedo gunboat HMS Curlew. Powered by two coal-fed three-cylinder vertical triple-expansion engines producing 3,000 indicated horsepower (2,200 kW), the Barracoutas reached a maximum speed of 16.5 knots (30.6 km/h; 19.0 mph).

While the Barracoutas were intended for service aboard, the Navy wanted even faster ships to serve in the Home Fleet or in the Mediterranean. The design's power was doubled to 6,000 ihp (4,500 kW) and was the hull was lengthened by 60 feet (18 m) to make room for more powerful locomotive boilers that produced a top speed of 19.5 knots (36.1 km/h; 22.4 mph). Known as the Barham class, the ships closely resembled the Barracouta design and were laid down mere months after them. The Barhams' main armament consisted of six 4.7-inch (120 mm) and four 3-pounder (1.4 kg) guns along with two machine guns and two 14-inch (360 mm) torpedo tubes fitted under the waterline. Their armour consisted of an armoured deck which was 0.98–2.01 inches (2.5–5.1 cm) thick and 2 in (5.1 cm) thick gunshields. To reach the top speed of 19.5 knots, six locomotive boilers fed by 140 tons of coal supplied two three-cylinder vertical triple expansion engines that turned two propellers. Each ship displaced 1,800 long tons (1,830 t) and was 280 feet 0 inches (85.34 m) long between perpendiculars, had a beam of 35 feet 0 inches (10.67 m), a draught of 13 feet 3 inches (4.04 m), and had a crew of 170.

== Service history ==
Two ships were built to the design: HMS Barham and Bellona, completed in 1890 and 1891, respectively. However, both encountered severe problems immediately. The boilers were placed under extreme strain when attempting to reach high speeds, leading to frequent breakdowns. Additionally, the rest of the machinery wore out quickly, making it nearly impossible to achieve their intended top speeds. Unable to fulfill their original purpose, the ships were reassigned as dispatch vessels, operating at a more manageable speed of 16 knots (30 km/h; 18 mph) and functioned as the British counterbalance to the French Forbin class. Between 1898 and 1899, both ships had their boilers replaced in an effort to address the speed issues. Equipped with Thornycroft 4,700 ihp (3,500 kW) boilers, the ships were able to regularly reach a speed of 18.5 knots (34.3 km/h; 21.3 mph). Despite the changes, Bellona was sold in 1906, and Barham in 1914.

In 1887, the Royal Navy realized the need for cheap and long-range ships to protect Australia. The Barham design was enlarged and given a new battery to form the Pearl-class cruiser, which was envisioned as a cheap alternative to larger second-class cruisers. In 1893, the design was again revisited. Fitted with better boilers, new weapons, and a new hull, the new design became the Pelorus-class cruiser.

== Ships ==
Name	Builder	Laid down	Launched	Completed	Fate	Ref
Barham	Portsmouth Drydock	22 October 1888	11 September 1889	1890	Broken up, 1914	
Bellona	Hawthorn	1889	29 August 1890	1891	Broken up, 1906	
