= Barracouta-class cruiser =

Royal Navy cruisers (1890–1905)

Class overview
- Name: Barracouta class
- Builders: Pembroke Dockyard; Portsmouth Dockyard; Sheerness Dockyard
- Operators: Royal Navy
- Succeeded by: Barham class
- Built: 1888–1889
- In commission: 1890–1905
- Completed: 4
- Retired: 4

General characteristics
- Type: 3rd class cruiser
- Displacement: 1,580 long tons (1,605 t)
- Length: 67.06 metres (220.0 ft) lbp; 71.02 metres (233.0 ft) loa
- Beam: 10.67 metres (35.0 ft),
- Draught: 4.6 metres (15 ft)
- Propulsion: 4 boilers; 2 steam engines; 2 propellers
- Speed: 16.5 knots (30.6 km/h; 19.0 mph)
- Complement: 160
- Armament: 6 × 4.7 inch QF guns; 4 × 3-pounder QF gun; 2 × machine guns; 2 × underwater torpedo tubes
- Armour: 1-2 inch (2.5-5.1cm) deck; 2 inches (5.1 cm) gun shields

The Barracouta-class cruiser was a series of 4 third-class cruisers operated by the Royal Navy between 1890 and 1905. The ships were the first British cruisers to incorporate a number of features, such as an armored deck and quick-firing guns, as those designs were copied from other vessels. Two more vessels were built based on a lengthened version of the class. The ships mainly operated in the Mediterranean and British home waters before the entire class was scrapped.

== Development and design ==
During the early 1880s, the Royal Navy worked to develop a new type of warship, known as the torpedo cruiser. Later designated as third-class cruisers, these vessels had the speed, size, and manuability to serve as a vanguard for ocean-going fleets of ironclads. In combat, doctrine called for the cruisers to sail ahead and engage enemy vessels, primarily torpedo boats, with their guns and underwater torpedo tubes. After several iterations of designs, the Navy was concerned that the cruisers were too slow to serve their purpose in an engagement. To rectify the issue in 1886, the design of the torpedo gunboat HMS Curlew was enlarged to make room for larger boilers that allowed for a top speed of 17 knots. The design was then given a battery identical to that seen on HMS Buzzard (1887), the torpedo tube layout of Curlew, a protected deck similar to that on the Medina-class gunboats, and the name Barracouta. Aside from their roles within a fleet, the ships were also designed to operate from isolated bases throughout the British Empire.

Thanks to the various elements incorporated from other types of ships, the Barracouta-class were the first British cruisers to be fitted with various new technologies. Her main battery of six 4.7-inch and four 3-pound guns were the first quick firing (QF) guns on a British cruiser, and their armament further consisted of two machine guns and two 14-inch underwater torpedo tubes. The ships also had the first protected deck on British cruisers, which was 2 inches (5.1 cm) thick on the sides and 1 inch (2.5 cm) thick on the ends and flat segments, joined by 2 inch gun shilds to form the ships' armor. To reach a top speed of 16.5 knots, the ships were fitted with 4 double ended boilers fed by 160 tons of coal that supplied two 3-cylinder vertical triple expansion engines that turned two propellers and produced a maximum of 3,000 ihp. Each ship displaced 1,580 metric tons and was 67.06 metres (220.0 ft) long between perpendiculars, 71.02 metres (233.0 ft) long overall, had a beam of 10.67 metres (35.0 ft), a draught of 4.6 metres (15 ft), and had a crew of 160.

== Ships ==
Every ship of the class, HMS Barracouta, Barrosa, Blanche, and Blondie, was laid down in 1888, launched in 1889, completed in 1890, and were all sold for scrap in 1905. The only difference was where each ship was built. While Blanche and Blondie were built at the Royal Pembroke Dockyard, Barrosa was built at the Portsmouth yard and Barracouta in Sheerness. They performed poorly at sea and were mainly confined to operations around the British Isles and Mediterranean.

The design was later lengthened and fitted with more powerful boilers to achieve a top speed of 19.5 knots. Later designated as the Barham-class cruiser, two ships, HMS Barham and Bellona, were launched in 1889 and 1890, respectfully.
