= Comus-class corvette =

1879 class of British corvettes

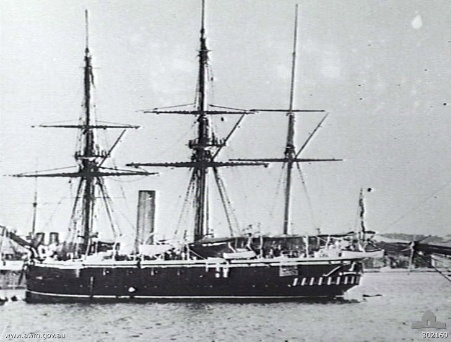
- HMS Curacoa at Sydney circa. 1890

Class overview
- Name: Comus class
- Operators: Royal Navy
- Preceded by: Bacchante class
- Succeeded by: Calypso class
- Built: 1876–1887
- In commission: 1879–1904
- Completed: 9
- Scrapped: 9

General characteristics
- Displacement: 2,380 tons
- Length: 225 ft (69 m)
- Beam: 44 ft (13 m)
- Draught: 19 ft (6 m)
- Propulsion: Single screw driven by compound engines of 2,590 ihp ( MW)
- Sail plan: Barque or ship rig
- Speed: 13.75 kt (25.5 km/h) powered; 14.75 kt (27.3 km/h)
- Armament: (As built) Comus: 2 × 7-inch (178 mm) muzzle-loading rifles; 4 × BL 6-inch (152 mm) 80-pounder guns; 8 × 64-pounder (160 mm) muzzle-loading rifles; 2 × light guns; 8 × QF Nordenfelt guns; 2 × torpedo carriages; Curacoa to Constance: 2 × 7-inch muzzle-loading rifles; 12 × 64-pounder muzzle-loading rifles; 2 × light guns; 8 × QF Nordenfelt guns; 2 × torpedo carriages; Canada & Cordelia: 10 × BL 6-inch (152 mm) Mk II guns; 2 × light guns; 6-10 × QF Nordenfelt guns; 2 × torpedo carriages
- Armour: Deck: 1.5 in (38 mm) over engines

The Comus class was a class of Royal Navy steam corvettes, re-classified as third-class cruisers in 1888. All were built between 1878 and 1881. The class exemplifies the transitional nature of the late Victorian navy. In design, materials, armament, and propulsion the class members resemble their wooden sailing antecedents, but blended with characteristics of the all-metal mastless steam cruisers which followed.

Despite their qualities they had relatively short commissions, as they soon were rendered superfluous by the "flood of warships" built under the Naval Defence Act of 1889. By the turn of the century all were in reserve, relegated to subsidiary duties, or being scrapped.

== Purpose ==
Great Britain had a worldwide empire, founded upon and sustained by seaborne commerce. To protect this trade and police its empire, Britain constructed many small and medium-sized cruisers, the latter typically armed with guns up to six inches in calibre. They were designed to serve long periods at sea, and therefore were equipped with sails. The nine Comus-class corvettes and their later derivatives – the two Calypso-class corvettes – were ships of this type.

== Design ==
Planning for six metal-hulled corvettes began in 1876. These vessels, which became the Comus-class corvettes, were designed by Nathaniel Barnaby. Among the Royal Navy's last sailing corvettes, they supplemented an extensive sail rig with powerful engines. Unlike their French rivals, which built fast steamers and needed neither long range nor a full rig of sail, the Royal Navy required their cruisers to be capable of long voyages away from coaling stations. Their ships therefore had a beamy hull to handle their sails, making them slower under steam than their French counterparts.

The British vessels were similar in appearance and layout to the older wooden and composite-hulled small cruisers they were intended to replace, albeit larger and more powerfully armed. The vessels were among the first of the smaller cruisers to be given metal hulls, with frames of iron or steel. The forefoot was a ram forged from brass, a feature then in vogue. In common with older wooden vessels, their hulls had copper sheathing over timber beneath the waterline, but that timber simply served to separate the iron hull from the copper sheathing so as to prevent electrolytic corrosion. The timber extended to the upper deck; it was in two layers from the keel to 3 ft (.9 m) above the water line, and one layer above.

In an early case of a single builder taking responsibility for building an entire class, contracts for these first six vessels were all awarded to the John Elder & Company at Govan on the Clyde. They were all fitted with 3-cylinder compound engines, with one high-pressure cylinder of 46 inches diameter being flanked by two low-pressure cylinders of 64 inches diameter.

Two to three years later, the Admiralty ordered an additional three vessels to be built to the same design. Construction of these was awarded to the Royal Dockyards at Chatham and Portsmouth. This second group differed by carrying a barque rig instead of the ship rig of the first six ships. The compound engines in the new batch were of 4-cylinder type, with two high-pressure cylinders of 36 inches diameter and two low-pressure cylinders of 64 inches diameter.

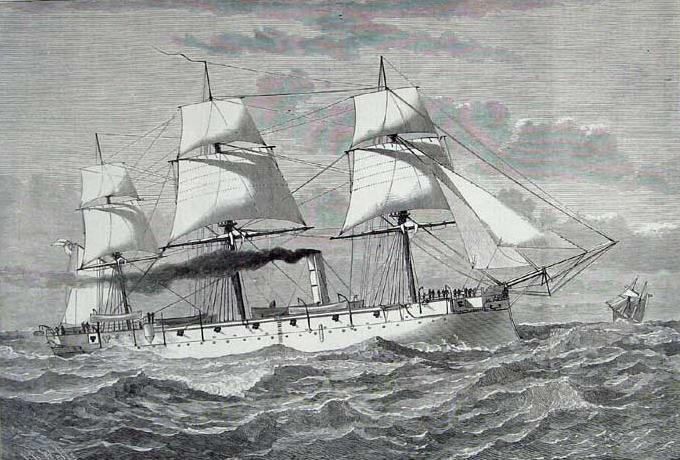
Comus when built, showing ship rig

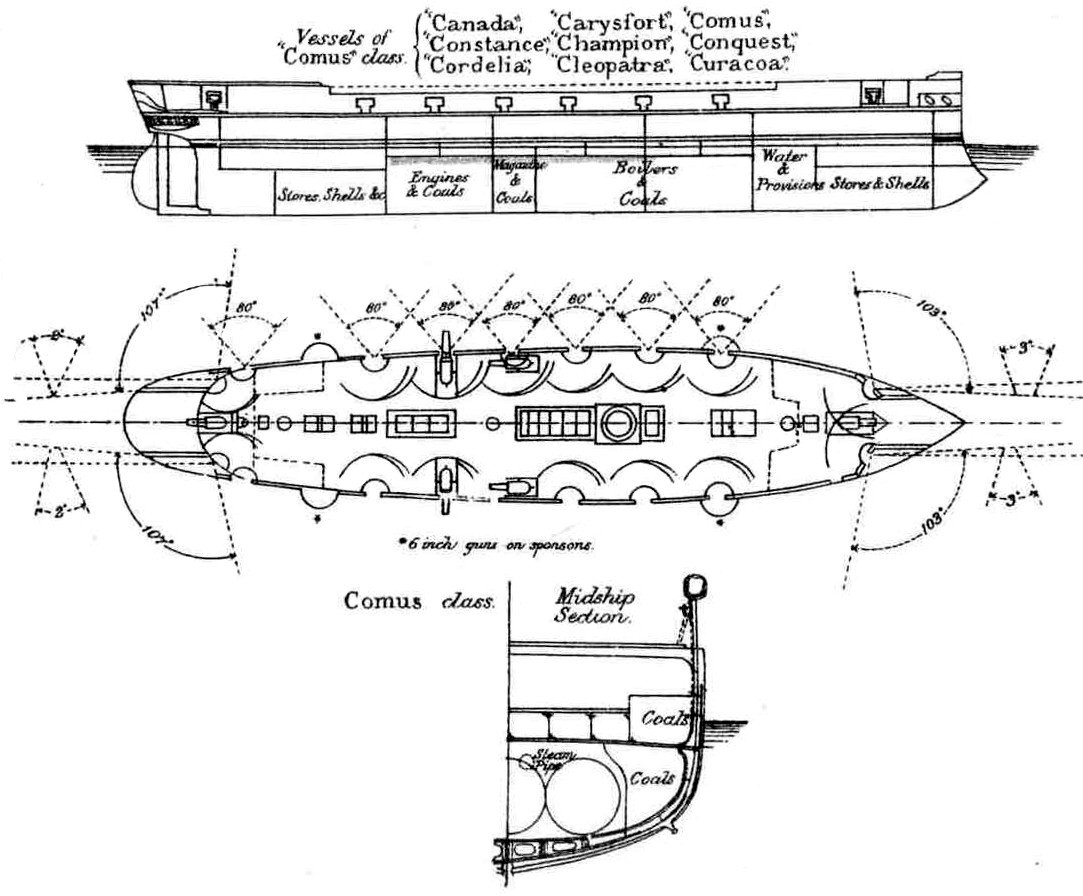
Diagrams of the Comus class

In the Comus class, the bow above the waterline was nearly straight, in contrast to that of wooden sailing ships. The corvettes had stern galleries, similar to older frigates, but the ports were false, and there were no quarter galleries. Boats were carried both amidships and at the stern. The ships flew a barque or ship rig of sail on three masts, including studding sails on fore and mainmasts. The masts were stayed by shrouds which were anchored to chainplates affixed to the inside of the gunwales, rather than the exterior as in wooden sailing ships. Their sailing rigs enabled them to serve in areas where coaling stations were rare, and to rely on their sails for propulsion.

The vessels had two complete decks, upper and lower, with partial decks at the forecastle and poop. The forecastle was used for the heads and working space for the cables. The poop deck contained cabins for the captain, first lieutenant, and navigating officer, with the double wheel sheltered under its forward end. Between these was the open quarterdeck on which the battery was located. Under the lower deck were spaces for water, provisions, coal, and magazines for shell and powder. Amidships were the engine and boiler rooms. These were covered by an armoured deck, 1.5 inches (38 mm) thick and approximately 100 ft (30 m) long. This armour was about 3 ft (90 cm) below the lower deck, and the space between could be used for additional coal bunkerage. The machinery spaces were flanked by coal bunkers, affording the machinery and magazines some protection from the sides. The lower deck was used for berthing of the ship's company; officers aft, warrant and petty officers forward, and ratings amidships, as was traditional. The tops of the coal bunkers, which projected above deck level, were used for seating at the mess tables. The living spaces were well-ventilated and an improvement over prior vessels.

There were some refinements in the design among class members, and the armament in particular changed during their careers. In 1881 an enlarged version of the design was drawn up by Barnaby, with the hull being lengthened by another 10 ft. Two ships were ordered to this later design, which became the Calypso class. The Comuses and Calypsos were sometimes called the "C class" of corvettes, an informal term rather than an official designation.

== Armament ==
Comus was armed with two 7-inch muzzle-loading rifles, eight 64-pounder muzzle-loading rifles and four breech-loading 6-inch 80-pounder guns, but the breech loaders proved unsatisfactory. The rest of the class were provided with four more 64-pounders in place of the 6-inch breech loaders, except for Canada and Cordelia, which exchanged all the muzzle loaders for ten of the new 6-inch Mk II breech loading guns. A selection of light guns and Nordenfelt quick-firing guns, as well as a pair of torpedo carriages, were also carried. The large guns were in embrasures in the bulwarks of the upper deck; this was a common (and to some extent a differentiating) feature of steam corvettes, as most frigates carried their main armament one deck lower. The details of the main armament varied between the vessels, and during their careers, as all were rearmed after their first commissions.

== Ships ==
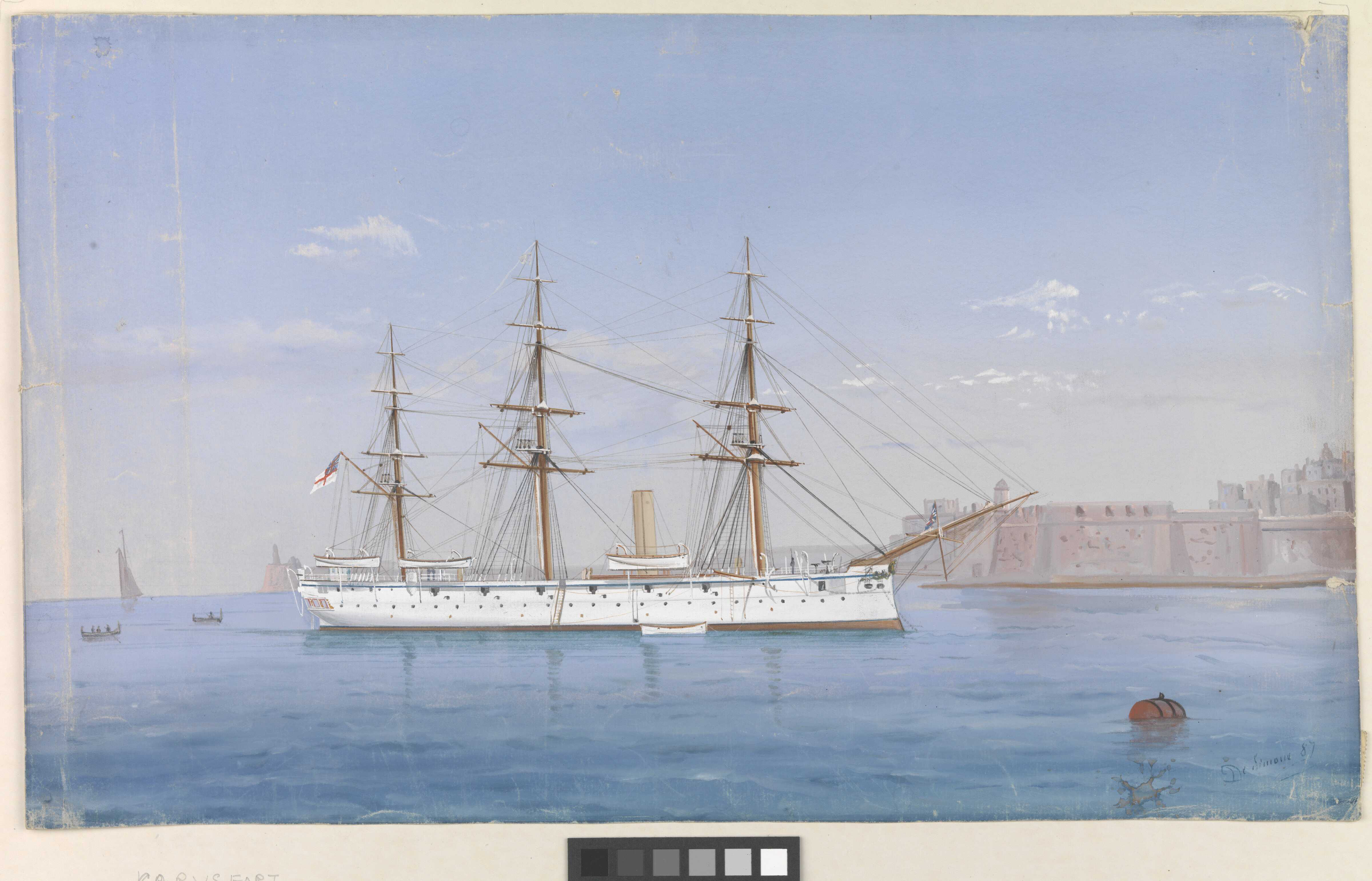
Painting of Carysfort c. 1887

| Ship | Laid down | Builder | Engine-builder | Launched | Completed | Disposition | Fate |
|---|---|---|---|---|---|---|---|
| Comus | 17 August 1876 | John Elder | John Elder | 3 April 1878 | 23 October 1879 | Struck 1902 | Sold for breaking 1904 |
| Curacoa | 17 August 1876 | John Elder | Humphrys, Tennant and Dykes | 18 April 1878 | 24 February 1880 | Seagoing tender | Sold for breaking 1904 |
| Champion | 17 August 1876 | John Elder | John Elder | 1 July 1878 | 7 December 1880 | Stokers' training ship | Sold for breaking 1919 |
| Cleopatra | 17 August 1876 | John Elder | Humphrys, Tennant and Dykes | 1 August 1878 | 24 August 1880 | Training ship; overflow hulk | Sold 1931, broken up 1933 |
| Carysfort | 17 August 1876 | John Elder | John Elder | 26 September 1878 | 15 September 1880 | Paid off 1901 | Sold for breaking 1899 |
| Conquest | 17 August 1876 | John Elder | Humphrys, Tennant and Dykes | 28 October 1878 | 18 April 1885 | Paid off 1894 | Sold for breaking 1899 |
| Constance | 14 September 1878 | Chatham | John Penn and Son | 9 June 1880 | 3 October 1882 | In reserve 1889 | Sold for breaking 1899 |
| Canada | 7 July 1879 | Portsmouth | J. & G. Rennie | 26 August 1881 | 1 May 1883 | In reserve 1896 | Sold for breaking ca. 1898 |
| Cordelia | 17 July 1879 | Portsmouth | J. & G. Rennie | 25 October 1881 | 25 January 1887 | Paid off 1898, stricken 1902 | Sold for breaking 1904 |

== Sources ==
- Archibald, E.H.H.; Ray Woodward (ill.) (1971). The Metal Fighting Ship in the Royal Navy 1860-1970. New York: Arco Publishing Co. ISBN 0-668-02509-3.
- Brassey, T.A. (1896). The Naval Annual. Portsmouth: J. Griffin and Co.
- Colledge, J. J.; Warlow, Ben (2006) [1969]. Ships of the Royal Navy: The Complete Record of All Fighting Ships of the Royal Navy from the 15th Century to the Present (3rd Rev ed.). London: Chatham Publishing. ISBN 978-1-86176-281-8. OCLC 67375475.
- Lyon, David (1980). Steam, Steel and Torpedoes. Ipswich: W.S. Cowell, Ltd. for HM Stationery Office. p. 39. ISBN 0-11-290318-5.
- Osbon, G. A. (1963). "Passing of the steam and sail corvette: the Comus and Calliope classes". Mariner's Mirror. 49. London: Society for Nautical Research: 193–208. doi:10.1080/00253359.1963.10657732. ISSN 0025-3359.
- Paine, Lincoln P. (2000). Warships of the World to 1900. New York: Houghton Mifflin. ISBN 0-395-98414-9.
- Winfield, R.; Lyon, D. (2004). The Sail and Steam Navy List: All the Ships of the Royal Navy 1815–1889. London: Chatham Publishing. ISBN 978-1-86176-032-6.
