= HMS Constance (1880) =

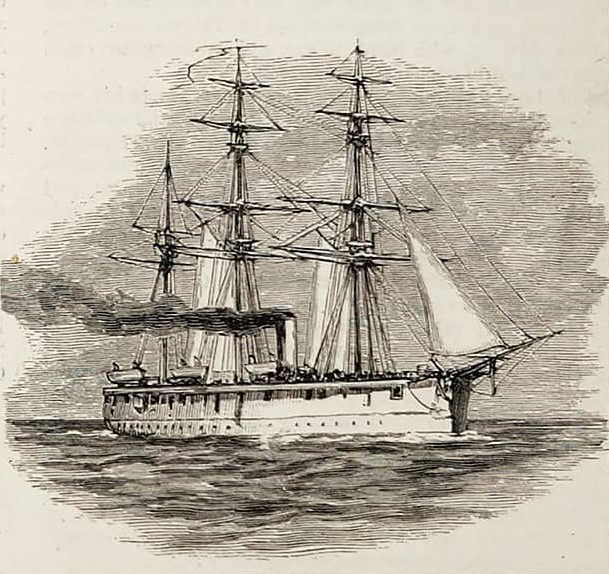
- HMS Constance

History

United Kingdom
- Name: HMS Constance
- Builder: Chatham Dockyard; Engines by John Penn & Son
- Way number: No. 4 Slip
- Laid down: 14 September 1878
- Launched: 9 June 1880
- Completed: 3 October 1882
- Fate: Sold on 15 December 1899

General characteristics
- Class & type: Comus-class corvette
- Displacement: 2,380 long tons (2,420 t)
- Length: 225 ft (68.6 m)
- Beam: 44.6 ft (13.6 m)
- Draught: 16 ft 9 in (5.1 m) forward; 18 ft 10 in (5.7 m) aft
- Installed power: 2,590 ihp (1,930 kW)
- Propulsion: 1 shaft, 1 Horizontal compound steam engine
- Sail plan: Barque-rigged
- Speed: 13.72 knots (25.41 km/h; 15.79 mph)
- Complement: 250
- Armament: As built: 2 × 7-inch muzzle-loading rifles; 4 × BL 6-inch 80-pounder guns; 8 × 64-pdr muzzle-loading rifles; 2 × light guns; 8 × QF Nordenfelt guns; 2 × torpedo carriages

HMS Constance was a Comus-class steel corvette of the Royal Navy. She was launched from Chatham Dockyard on 9 June 1880.

== Design and construction ==
Constance was one of nine ship class of steel corvettes built in the late 1870s and early 1880s to an 1876 design by Nathaniel Barnaby. They were later designated as 'third class cruisers'. Six ships of the class were built at the commercial yards of J. Elder & Co., at Glasgow, while the remaining three were built by the Royal Dockyards, with Constance being laid down at Chatham Dockyard on 14 September 1878. The three built by these dockyards differed from their sisters in having been barque-rigged, rather than a full ship rig, and had 4-cylinder engines rather than 3-cylinder. Constance's engines were supplied by John Penn & Son. Constance further differed from her sisters in having feathering rather than hoisting screws, a feature she shared only with HMS Carysfort. These two ships were also the only two not to be rearmed with 6in breech-loading guns of Mk. III or IV. The Comus-class ships had steel hulls clad with two layers of teak, while their bottoms were sheathed with copper. They marked a dramatic step forward in basic habitability, with improved below-decks ventilation, a sick bay, bathroom for ratings and even a ship's library.

Constance was laid down at Chatham Dockyard on 14 September 1878. She was built on No. 4 Slip, alongside HMS Polyphemus, which was built on No. 5 Slip. Originally scheduled for launch on 26 May 1880, she was launched on 9 June 1880. The christening of the ship was performed by Miss Macdonald, daughter of Vice-Admiral Sir Reginald Macdonald, KCSI, Commander-in-Chief at the Nore. The launch did not go smoothly, as the ship hung due to a malfunction in the launch system. The ship was eventually launched to loud cheering from the thousands of spectators. On 17 May 1881, Constance was being undocked in a gale when a rope snapped, setting her adrift. She collided with another vessel and the dockyard wall before a tug could take her in tow. Damage was slight. Work on her had been completed by 3 October 1882.

== Career ==
Constance undertook her first sea trials on 8 July 1880. These lasted for six hours, with the ship being under the command of Captain Hunt-Grubbe CB, ADC. A speed of 13.787 knots (25.534 km/h) was achieved. In 1882, Constance was fitted with a pair of torpedo carriages of a new design which used compressed air to launch the torpedoes. She was the first ship of the Royal Navy to be fitted with this design of torpedo launcher. Appointments to Constance in September 1882 included midshipman Charles Vaughan-Lee, and Captain Frederic Proby Doughty. Proby Doughty had previously been in command of HMS Crocodile.

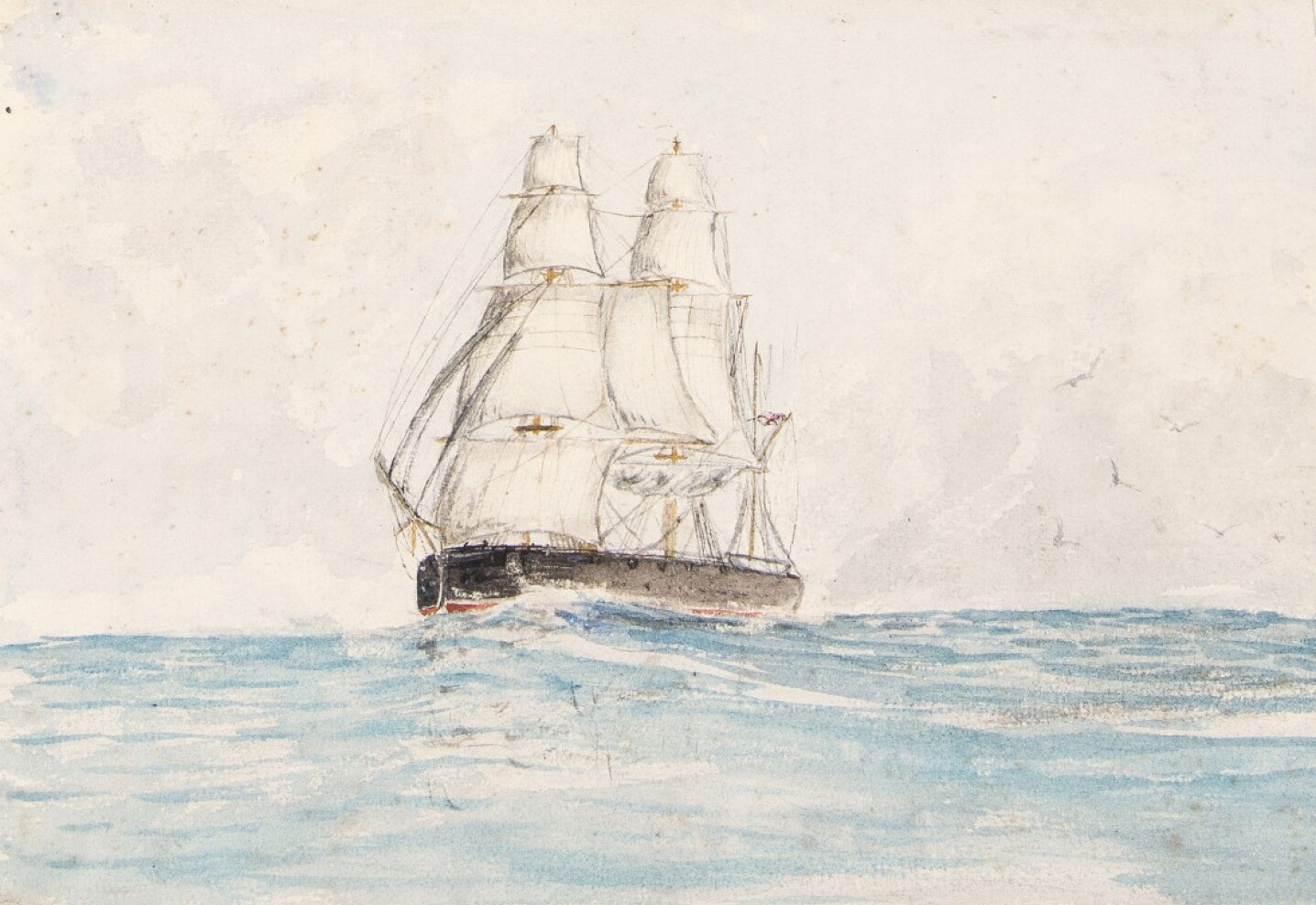
HMS Constance, circa 1882, drawn by an officer on board

Constance was commissioned on 3 October 1882. She relieved HMS Thetis, which was stationed in the Pacific. Her complement of 264 officers and men included a number of Royal Marines and Royal Marine Artillery. As Constance was scheduled to depart from Chatham for the Pacific on 16 October, a large number of her crew were granted shore leave on 15 October. Whilst ashore, a fight developed between the crews of Constance and HMS Linnet (also scheduled to depart for overseas service) on one side, and HMS Jumna on the other. Nearly 100 sailors were involved, with a number of them being arrested by local and military police, assisted by reinforcements sent from the Dockyard. The prisoners were taken to their respective ships. By 20 October, Constance and Linnet were at Sheerness, with departure scheduled for 25 October. By November, Constance was at Spithead awaiting further speed trials. The speed trials were undertaken on 21 November under the command of Captain Colomb. A speed of 13.71 knots (25.39 km/h) was achieved, which was in excess of that specified by the Admiralty when the contract for building Constance was granted. Constance departed under the command of Captain Proby Doughty on 19 December, bound for the Pacific in order to relieve Thetis.

By September 1883, Constance was on station at Guayaquil, Ecuador, where she was to relieve HMS Comus in patrolling the coasts of Chile and Peru. Constance arrived at Honolulu, Hawaii on 13 April 1884, and then departed for Victoria, British Columbia. From there she sailed to San Francisco, California. She departed San Francisco on 1 August 1885 bound for Coquimbo, Chile via Honolulu, Raratonga, the Hervey Islands and Tahiti. She arrived at Honolulu on 29 August. In August 1885, it was reported that Constance was to be relieved by HMS Conquest, and was to return to the Medway for decommissioning. Constance arrived at San Francisco on 20 September 1885, departing on 25 September for Panama. On 27 October 1885, Captain Seymour Dacres was appointed to command Constance. From Panama, Constance sailed to Hong Kong via Honolulu. On arrival at Hong Kong, Constance relieved HMS Curacoa, which was to be paid off. Whilst at Hong Kong, Constance underwent a refit.

In 1886, Constance was serving in Japan. She departed Yokohama on 13 November bound for Kobe, Nagasaki and Port Hamilton, Korea. On 4 June 1887, Captain Lester Keppel was appointed in command of Constance. During Keppel's command, the ship's mascot was a goat. Constance was refitted at Hong Kong in December 1887.

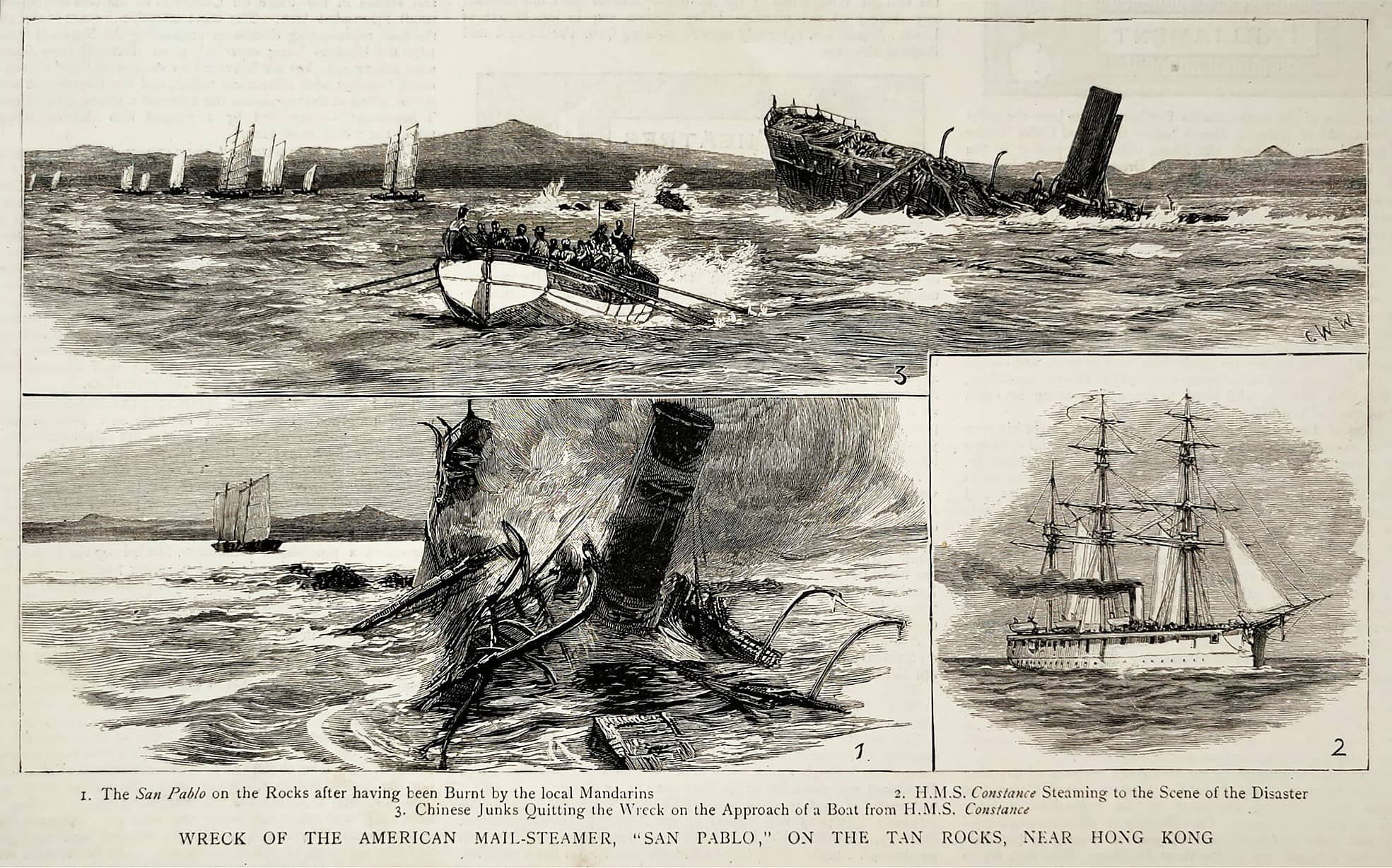
Wreck of the American Mail-Steamer, San Pablo, on the Tan Rocks, near Hong Kong, where Constance came to the rescue. The Graphic 1888

In October 1888, Constance was at Goskevitch Bay, Manchuria. The next month, it was reported that HMS Severn was being sent to relieve Constance.

In March 1891, Constance was reported as being out of commission. She was not amongst the list of ships which could be made ready for sea within a week. In December, it was reported that as there was no intention to return Constance to service at the time, new guns allocated to her would instead be installed on HMS Satellite. Constance was sold for scrap on 15 December 1899.
