= HMS Calypso =

The following ships of the Royal Navy were assigned the name Calypso, after Calypso, a sea nymph in Greek mythology:

- HMS Calypso (1783), a 16-gun sloop of 342 tons burthen, launched at Graves, Deptford 27 September 1783. She sank during a violent storm on 30 July 1803 with the loss of all her crew when a heavily laden West Indiaman ran afoul of her.
- HMS Calypso (1805), an 18-gun sloop of the Cruizer class launched at Dudman, Deptford Wharf 2 February 1805; not broken up until 1821.
- HMS Calypso (1826), a 10-gun Cherokee-class brig-sloop. Ordered 1824 for construction at Deptford Dockyard; renamed Hyaena in 1826; and cancelled 21 February 1831.
- Calypso was to be a 10-gun brig-sloop of the Cherokee class. Laid down March 1825 at Chatham Dockyard as HMS Hyaena; launched 19 August 1826 and renamed Calypso that same year; completed as a yacht for the governor of Malta. Later she became a Post Office packet service brig for Royal Navy. She sailed from Halifax, Nova Scotia for Falmouth, Cornwall on 29 January 1833, under the command of Lieutenant Richard Peynton, RN. One day later a fishing crew saw Calypso surrounded by ice, and firing her guns as a signal of distress. The ice prevented the fishing boat from coming to her rescue. Calypso was lost on 1 February 1833; all aboard died.
- Calypso, to be a 10-gun brig-sloop of the Cherokee class. Laid down 1829 at Woolwich dockyard; renamed Hyaena in 1830; cancelled 1831.
- HMS Calypso (1845), a sixth rate launched at Chatham Dockyard in May 1845; broken up 29 January 1866.
- HMS Blonde (1819), a 46-gun fifth rate of 1,103 tons bm. Launched at Deptford Dockyard 12 January 1819. Relegated to harbour service in 1850; renamed HMS Calypso 9 March 1870, and sold 28 February 1895.
- HMS Calypso (1883), a Calypso-class corvette launched in 1883, used as a training ship for the Newfoundland Royal Naval Reserve from 1902, renamed HMS Briton in 1916, sold in 1922 and used as a storage hulk, and now awash north of Lewisporte.
- HMS Calypso (D61), a C-class cruiser of the Caledon sub-class; launched in 1917 and sunk in 1940 by the Italian submarine Alpino Bagnolini.

== See also ==
- RV Calypso (ex-Royal Navy minesweeper HMS J-026), research ship of Jacques-Yves Cousteau
- Calypso-class corvette, a British Royal Navy steam corvette class
- Calypso (ship)
