= HMS Champion (1878) =

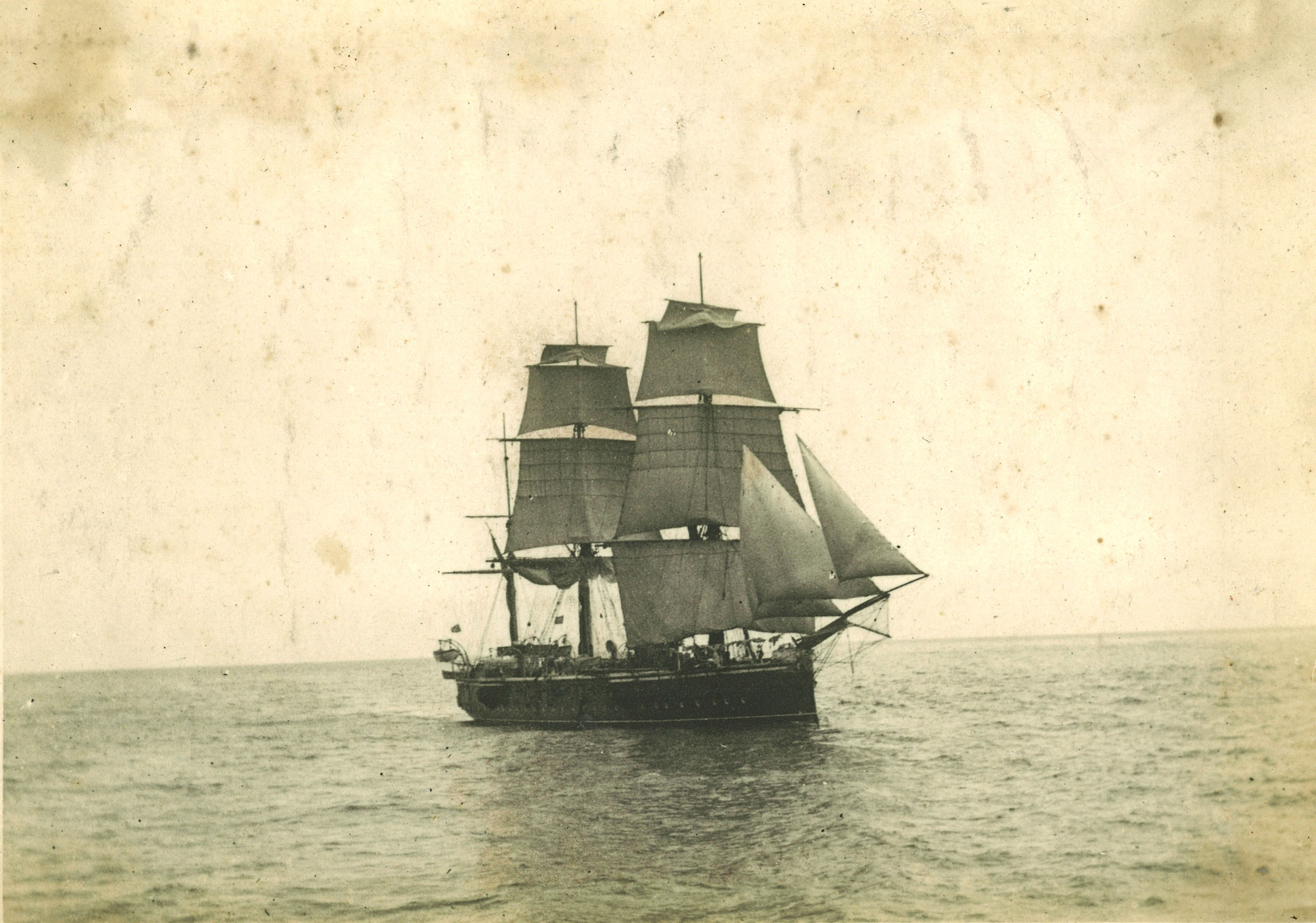

History

United Kingdom
- Name: HMS Champion
- Builder: J. Elder & Co., Glasgow
- Laid down: 17 August 1876
- Launched: 1 July 1878
- Commissioned: 7 December 1880
- Fate: Scrapped in 1919

General characteristics
- Class & type: Comus-class corvette
- Displacement: 2,380 long tons
- Length: 225 ft (69 m)
- Beam: 44.6 ft (14 m)
- Draught: 16 ft 9 in (5 m) forward; 19 ft 10 in (6 m) aft
- Propulsion: 2 engines of 2,590 ihp driving single screw
- Speed: 13 kt
- Range: 3840 miles @ 10 knots
- Complement: 265
- Armament: As built: 2 × 7-inch muzzle-loading rifles; 4 × BL 6-inch 80-pounder guns; 8 × 64-pdr muzzle-loading rifles; 2 × light guns; 8 × QF Nordenfelt guns; 2 × torpedo carriages

HMS Champion was one of nine Comus-class corvettes of the Royal Navy, built in the late 1870s and early 1880s to a design by Nathaniel Barnaby. Champion was one of three in the class built by J. Elder & Co., Govan, Scotland and was launched on 1 July 1878. She was the third vessel under this name in the Royal Navy.

== Design and construction ==
Champion was a single-screw corvette (later classified as a third-class cruiser) designed for distant cruising service for the British Empire. The intention of the Royal Navy was to use the class as scout vessel for the fleet, but due to their slow speed, the class was mainly used for protection across the globe. Built with iron frames and steel plating, Champion was sheathed with two layers of teak wood and sheathed with copper. The hull was unprotected except for a 1.5 in (38 mm) of armour over the machinery spaces. with some additional protection offered by the coal bunkers flanking the engine spaces and magazines. They marked a dramatic step forward in basic habitability, with improved below-decks ventilation, a sick bay, bathroom for ratings and even a ship’s library.

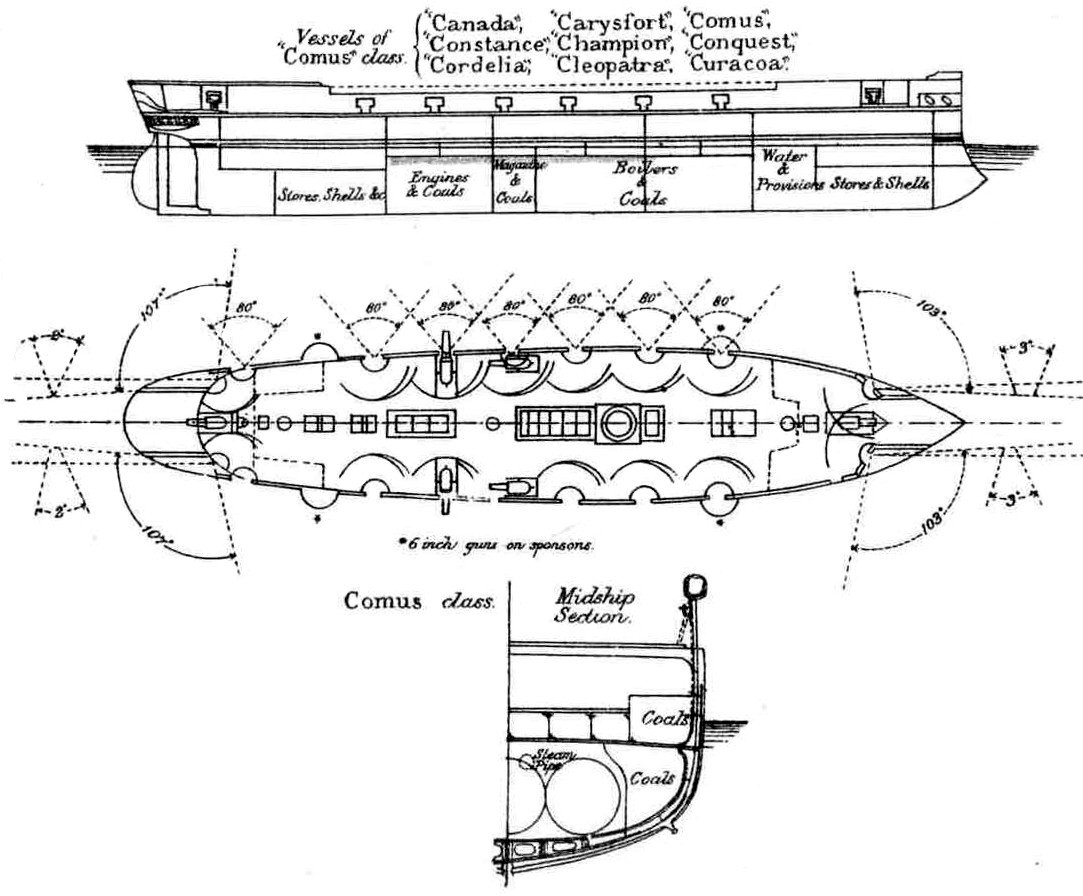
Diagram of the Comus class

Champion had a ship rig, with sqaresails on all three masts. She and her class were among the last of the sailing corvettes. The vessel was also equipped with a steam engine driving a single screw with 2,590 indicated horsepower; to reduce resistance, this propeller could be hoisted into a slot cut in the keel when the vessel was under sail.

Champion initially carried two 7-inch muzzle-loading rifles, four breechloading 6-inch 80-pounder guns and eight 64-pdr muzzle-loading rifles, but the breech loaders proved unsatisfactory and were replaced in 1885 with four 6 inch BL MK III, eight 5 inch BL MK III, four QF 3 pounder Hotchkiss and two light guns, six machine guns and two torpedo carriages.

Laid down on 17 August 1876 as yard number 207, Champion was launched on 1 July 1878 and commissioned on 7 December 1880.

== Career ==
Champion was fitted for sea at Sheerness. She visited Amoy, China in April 1886 and was based in the Pacific from 1890 with the China Station.

In August 1891 under command of Captain Frederick St Clair, Champion cooperated in a joint landing by French, American and German warships at Valparaíso, Chile, to protect civilians and their respective consulates during the 1891 Chilean Civil War. The officers of the international parties placed themselves in front of the muzzles of some machine guns with which the president-elect had threatened the civilian populace. During 1892, Champion made a survey and map to Johnston Atoll, hoping that it might be suitable as a cable station. On 16 January 1893, the Hawaiian Legation at London reported a diplomatic conference over this temporary occupation of the island. In 1893, under command of Captain Rookes, Champion visited Pitcairn Island, during which time Captain Rookes prepared a criminal code and reorganized the government of the colony.

Champion was present at the Naval Review at Spithead in celebration of the Diamond Jubilee on 26 June 1897.

From 1904, she was placed in harbour duty as a training vessel, and became a stokers training ship in Chatham. She was renamed Champion (old) when the new HMS Champion was built in 1915. During the First World War she was moored in the middle of the Thames between Cliffe Fort and Coalhouse Fort, where she was used by the River Examination Service to control river traffic. On 23 June 1919, her hulk was sold to Hughes Bolckow, Blyth for scrapping.
