= HMS Canada (1881) =

British naval ship

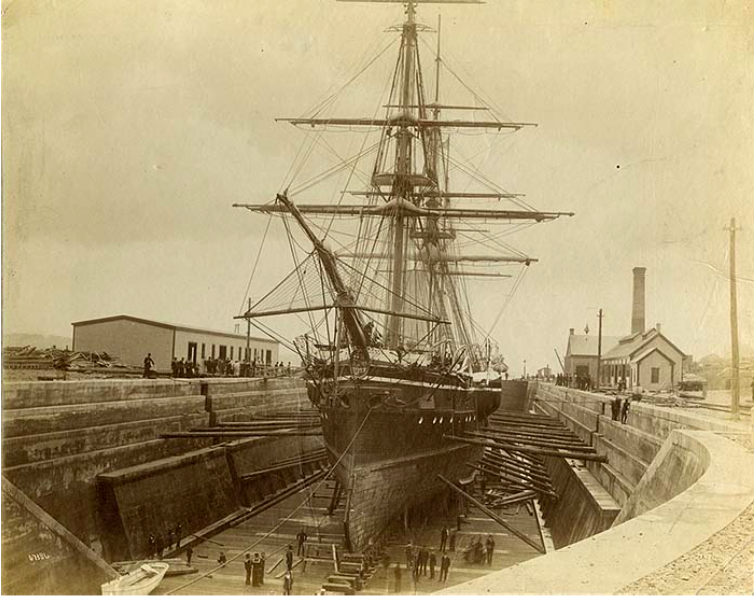
- HMS Canada in dry-dock, Halifax Graving Yards, Halifax, Nova Scotia, 1889

History

United Kingdom
- Name: Canada
- Builder: Portsmouth Dockyard
- Laid down: 1879
- Launched: 26 August 1881
- Completed: 1881
- Fate: Sold 1897

General characteristics
- Class & type: Comus-class corvette
- Displacement: 2,380 long tons (2,420 t)
- Length: 225 ft (69 m)
- Beam: 44 ft 6 in (13.56 m)
- Draught: 19 ft 3 in (5.87 m)
- Installed power: 2,430 ihp (1,810 kW)
- Propulsion: Horizontal Compound engine; 1 shaft
- Sail plan: Barque-rigged
- Speed: 13.0 knots (24.1 km/h; 15.0 mph)
- Armament: 10 × BL 6-inch (152 mm) Mk II guns; 2 × light guns; 6 × machine guns
- Armour: Deck: 1.5 in (38 mm) over engines

HMS Canada was a Comus-class screw corvette of the Royal Navy. She was launched in 1881 and sold for scrap in 1897. Her bow badge was removed prior to being sold for scrap and is displayed in the Maritime Museum of British Columbia.

== Construction ==
Canada was laid down at Portsmouth Dockyard in 1879, one of nine ships of the Comus class. She was launched on 26 August 1881 and completed later that year.

== Design ==
Planning for six metal-hulled corvettes began in 1876; these became the Comus-class corvettes and were designed for long voyages away from coaling stations. Given a metal hull, their frames were composed of iron or steel. Their hulls had copper sheathing over timber beneath the waterline, but that timber simply served to separate the iron hull from the copper sheathing so as to prevent electrolytic corrosion. The timber extended to the upper deck; it was in two layers from the keel to 3 ft (.9 m) above the water line, and one layer above.

They were fitted with 3-cylinder compound engines with one high-pressure cylinder of 46 inches (1,200 mm) diameter being flanked by two low-pressure cylinders of 64 inches (1,600 mm) diameter. The bow above the waterline was nearly straight, in contrast to that of wooden sailing ships. They had stern galleries, similar to older frigates, but the ports were false, and there were no quarter galleries. Boats were carried both amidships and at the stern. They flew a barque or ship rig of sail on three masts, including studding sails on fore and mainmasts.

Between their two complete decks was the open quarterdeck, on which the battery was located. Under the lower deck were spaces for water, provisions, coal, and magazines for shell and powder. Amidships were the engine and boiler rooms. These were covered by an armoured deck, 1.5 inches (38 mm) thick and approximately 100 ft (30 m) long. This armour was about 3 ft (90 cm) below the lower deck, and the space between could be used for additional coal bunkerage. The machinery spaces were flanked by coal bunkers, affording the machinery and magazines some protection from the sides. The lower deck was used for berthing of the ship's company; officers aft, warrant and petty officers forward, and ratings amidships, as was traditional. The tops of the coal bunkers, which projected above deck level, were used for seating at the mess tables. The living spaces were well-ventilated and an improvement over prior vessels.

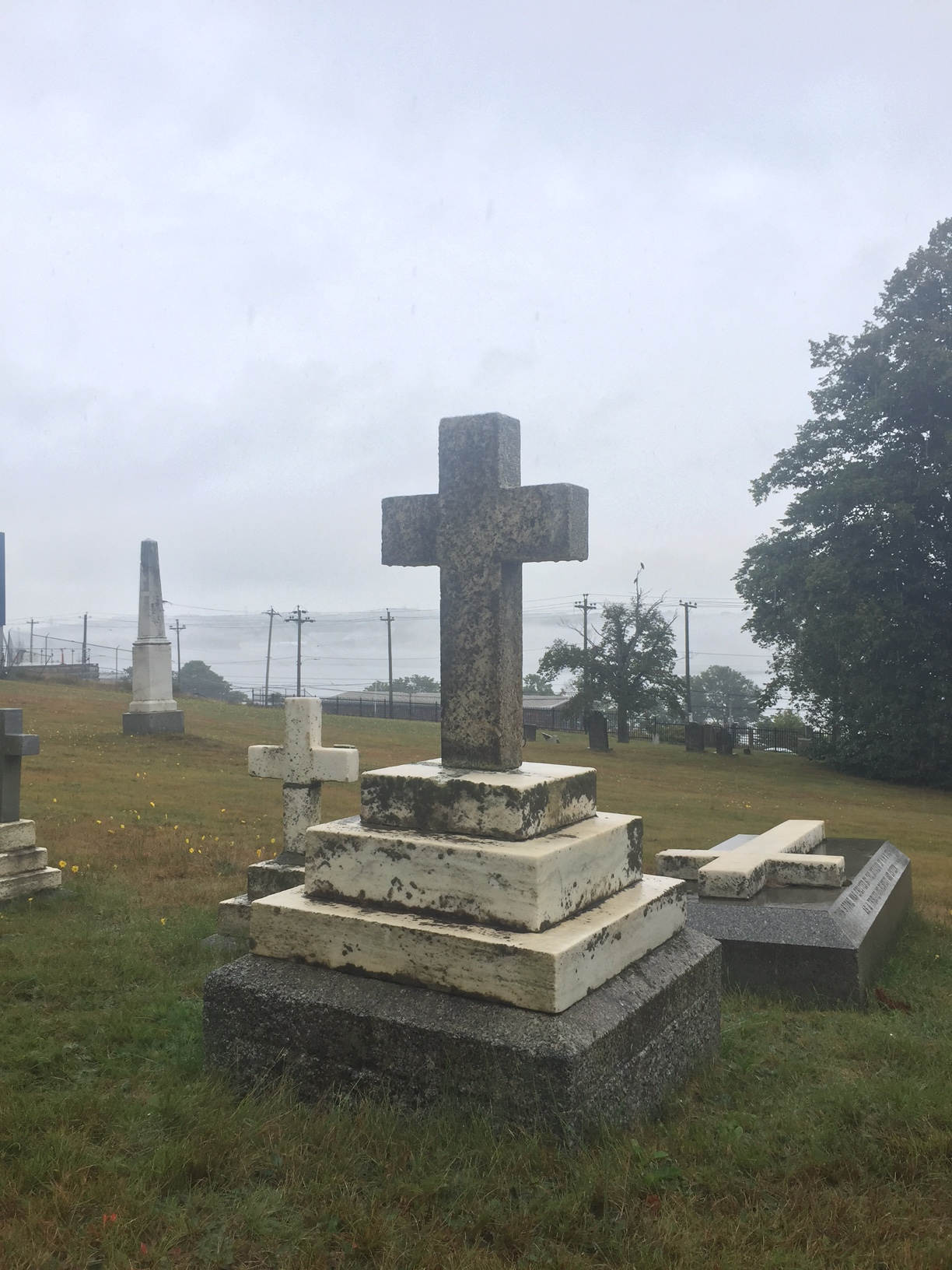
Monument to the three crew that died on HMS Canada at Halifax, Royal Navy Burying Ground (Halifax, Nova Scotia)

== Service ==
Canada served on the North America and West Indies Station based at the Royal Naval Dockyard at Bermuda between 1881 and 1886, during which period the future King George V served aboard her as a Royal Navy lieutenant. In 1892, she was refitted at Portsmouth, returning to the North America and West Indies Station between 1893 and 1896. She was paid off into reserve in December 1896.

She was sold in 1897.
