= HMS Cleopatra (1878) =

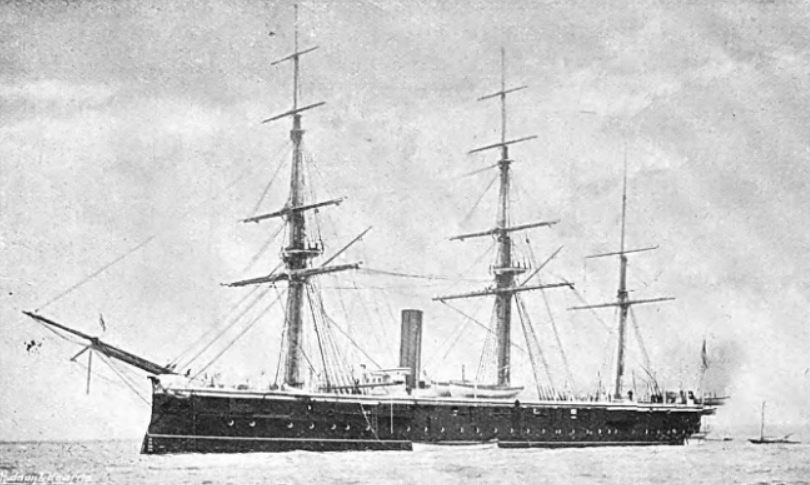
- Cleopatra c.1898

History

United Kingdom
- Name: HMS Cleopatra
- Builder: John Elder & Co Govan
- Yard number: 209
- Launched: 1 August 1878
- Name: HMS Defiance III
- Renamed: 1922
- Fate: Sold for scrap to S Castle, Millbay, July 1931

General characteristics
- Class & type: Comus-class corvette
- Displacement: 2,380 long tons (2,420 t)
- Length: 225 ft (69 m)
- Beam: 44 ft 6 in (13.6 m)
- Draught: 19 ft 6 in (6 m)
- Propulsion: Sail, engines by Humphrys, Tennant & Co.

HMS Cleopatra was a Royal Navy Comus-class screw corvette built in 1878.

== Design ==
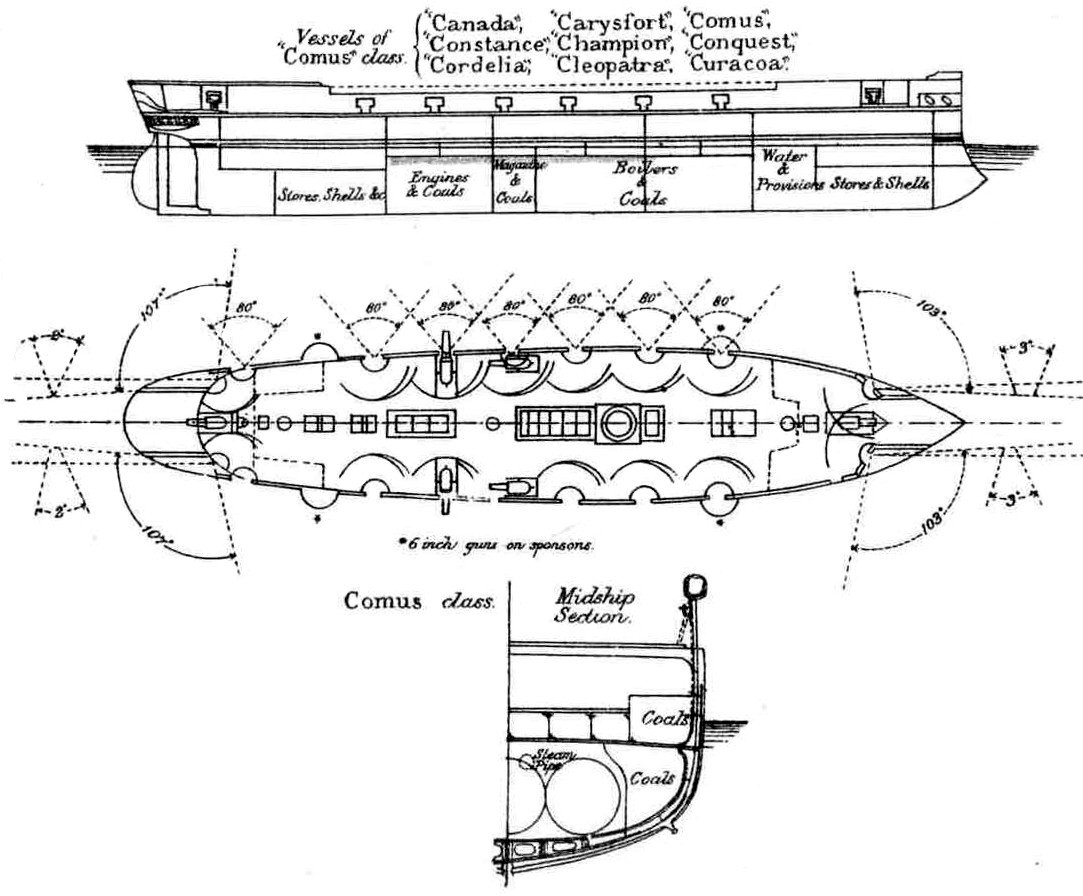
Diagram of a Comus-class corvette, Brasseys 1888

Planning for six metal-hulled corvettes began in 1876; these became the Comus-class corvettes and were designed for long voyages away from coaling stations. Given a metal hull, their frames were composed of iron or steel. Their hulls had copper sheathing over timber beneath the waterline, but that timber simply served to separate the iron hull from the copper sheathing so as to prevent electrolytic corrosion. The timber extended to the upper deck; it was in two layers from the keel to 3 ft (.9 m) above the water line, and one layer above.

They were fitted with 3-cylinder compound engines with one high-pressure cylinder of 46 inches (1,200 mm) diameter being flanked by two low-pressure cylinders of 64 inches (1,600 mm) diameter. The bow above the waterline was nearly straight, in contrast to that of wooden sailing ships. They had stern galleries, similar to older frigates, but the ports were false, and there were no quarter galleries. Boats were carried both amidships and at the stern. They flew a barque or ship rig of sail on three masts, including studding sails on fore and mainmasts.

Between their two complete decks was the open quarterdeck, on which the battery was located. Under the lower deck were spaces for water, provisions, coal, and magazines for shell and powder. Amidships were the engine and boiler rooms. These were covered by an armoured deck, 1.5 inches (38 mm) thick and approximately 100 ft (30 m) long. This armour was about 3 ft (90 cm) below the lower deck, and the space between could be used for additional coal bunkerage. The machinery spaces were flanked by coal bunkers, affording the machinery and magazines some protection from the sides. The lower deck was used for berthing of the ship's company; officers aft, warrant and petty officers forward, and ratings amidships, as was traditional. The tops of the coal bunkers, which projected above deck level, were used for seating at the mess tables. The living spaces were well-ventilated and an improvement over prior vessels.

== Service history ==
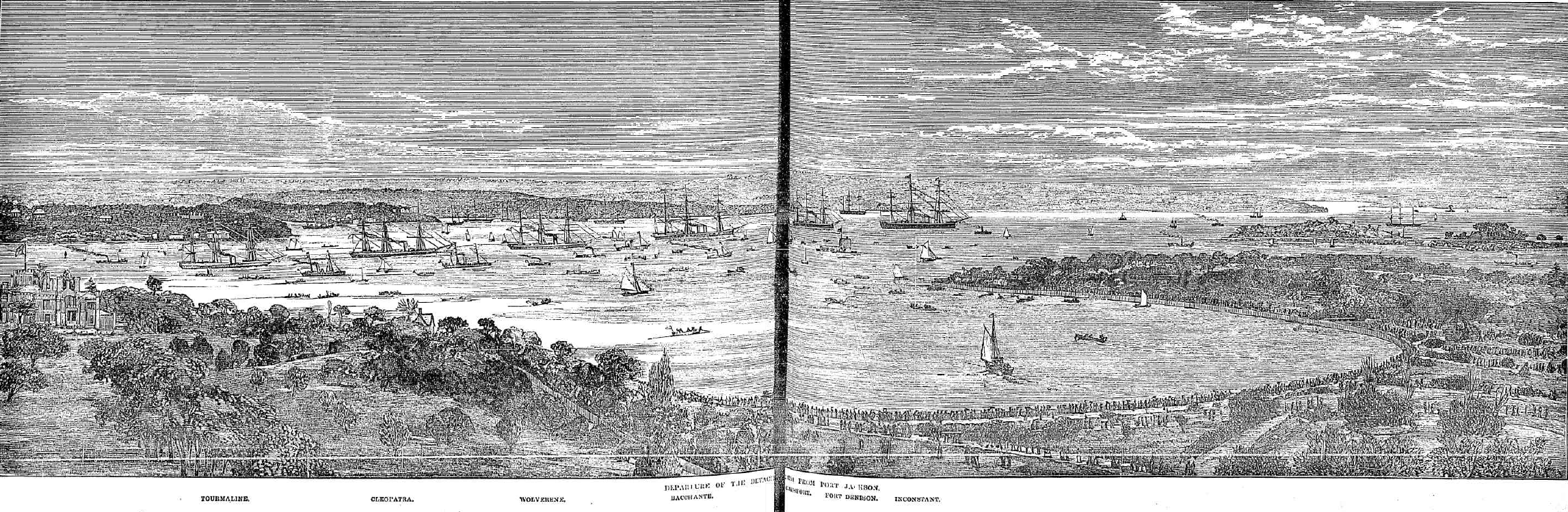
Departure of the detached squadron from Port Jackson, 1881. Cleopatra in attendance

On 18 December 1878, Cleopatra ran into the steamship Lord Gough in the Clyde, severely damaging her.

Cleopatra was used as a training cruiser in 1902 and visited Jersey in June 1902, Guernsey two months later, then toured various parts of British waters until late September, with a break taking part in the Coronation Fleet review at Spithead on 16 August 1902. During late Autumn she visited the Spanish cities of Vigo and Málaga in early November 1902, then Gibraltar, the island of Madeira and the Spanish cities of Ferrol and Vilagarcía. Her winter cruise from late January to April 1903 took her to Arousa Bay, Gibraltar, Mahón, Palma de Mallorca, Cádiz and Vigo.

== Bibliography ==
- Osbon, G. A. (1963). "Passing of the steam and sail corvette: the Comus and Calliope classes". Mariner's Mirror. 49. London: Society for Nautical Research: 193–208. doi:10.1080/00253359.1963.10657732. ISSN 0025-3359.
- Archibald, E.H.H. (1971). The Metal Fighting Ship in the Royal Navy 1860-1970. Ray Woodward (ill.). New York: Arco Publishing Co. ISBN 0-668-02509-3.
- Lyon, David (1980). Steam, Steel and Torpedoes. Ipswich: W.S. Cowell, Ltd. for HM Stationery Office. p. 39. ISBN 0-11-290318-5.
