= HMS Comus (1878) =

- HMS Comus in St John's Harbour, Newfoundland on 24th May 1899

History

United Kingdom
- Name: HMS Comus
- Builder: J. Elder & Co., Glasgow
- Laid down: 1876
- Launched: 4 April 1878
- Fate: Sold in 1904

General characteristics
- Class & type: Comus-class corvette
- Displacement: 2,380 long tons
- Length: 225 ft (69 m)
- Beam: 44.6 ft (14 m)
- Draught: 16 ft 9 in (5 m) forward; 18 ft 10 in (6 m) aft
- Propulsion: 2 engines of 2,590 ihp driving single screw
- Speed: 13 kt
- Complement: 250
- Armament: As built: 2 × 7-inch muzzle-loading rifles; 4 × BL 6-inch 80-pounder guns; 8 × 64-pdr muzzle-loading rifles; 2 × light guns; 8 × QF Nordenfelt guns; 2 × torpedo carriages

HMS Comus was a corvette (reclassified in 1888 as a third-class cruiser) of the Royal Navy. She was the name ship of her class. Launched in April 1878, the vessel was built by Messrs. J. Elder & Co of Glasgow at a cost of £123,000.

Comus and her classmates were built during a period of naval transition. Sail was giving way to steam, wooden hulls to metal, and smooth-bore muzzle-loading guns to naval rifles. Comus shows this transition; she was driven by both sails and a reciprocating steam engine; her hull was iron and steel but sheathed with wood and copper; and some of her muzzleloading guns were replaced by rifled breechloaders.

Comus was active for about two decades, but in that time went to the ends of empire, from the British Isles to the Caribbean and Nova Scotia to southwest Africa in the western hemisphere, and in the eastern, from the southern Indian Ocean to the northwest Pacific, and from the China station to the Strait of Magellan.

== Design ==
Comus was a single-screw corvette (later classified as a third-class cruiser) designed for distant cruising service for the British Empire. Built with iron frames and steel plating, she was sheathed with wood and coppered. The hull was unprotected except for a 1.5 in (38 mm) of armour over the machinery spaces. with some additional protection offered by the coal bunkers flanking the engine spaces and magazines.

Comus had a ship rig, with squaresails on all three masts. She and her class were among the last of the sailing corvettes. The vessel was also equipped with a steam engine driving a single screw with 2,590 indicated horsepower; to reduce resistance, this propeller could be hoisted into a slot cut in the keel when the vessel was under sail.

The ship initially carried two 7-inch muzzle-loading rifles, four breechloading 6-inch 80-pounder guns and eight 64-pdr muzzle-loading rifles, but the breech loaders proved unsatisfactory and were replaced in the rest of the class with more 64-pounders.

== Career ==
On 15 September 1878, the British steamship City of Mecca ran into Comus and the Italian barque Cosmopolita in the Clyde, damaging both vessels.

=== 1879–1884 Indian and Pacific Oceans ===
Comus was fitted for sea at Sheerness and commissioned on 23 October 1879 for service on the China Station, under Captain James East and First Lieutenant (later Rear Admiral) George Neville. In November of that year she was still completing her trials. The ship then sailed for China, but was first assigned a "particular service", a search for Knowlsey Hall, an iron sailing vessel which had not been heard from since her departure from Liverpool in May 1879. Comus searched the Crozet Islands, and other islands in the southern Indian Ocean. In 1880 Comus returned to the Crozets in order to deposit a cache of provisions at Possession Island for the use of shipwrecked mariners. The 1881 census, which included British ships at sea, listed Chinese amongst her crew. In 1881–82 the ship was at the Pellew Islands off the north coast of Australia.

Later in 1882 Comus crossed the Pacific Ocean to San Francisco, and refit to prepare to take the Marquis of Lorne, Governor General of Canada, and his spouse the Princess Louise, daughter of Queen Victoria, to British Columbia. An anonymous note threatened the ship with destruction when the couple boarded, but a search yielded nothing, and the US revenue cutter Richard Rush escorted the corvette out of the harbour. Comus delivered the couple to Esquimalt Harbour at Victoria, British Columbia in September. The next month Comus rendered assistance to two American vessels in distress off Vancouver Island, actions for which Captain East was awarded a gold medal by the President of the United States. Comus returned the governor-general and the princess to San Francisco in December.

In 1884 Comus sailed for home. Upon arrival in 1885, the corvette was rearmed and was partially rebuilt. The 7-inch guns and the 64-pounders at the corners were removed; the latter were replaced by 6-inch breechloaders on new sponsons. A single conning tower replaced the old pair.

=== 1886–1891 North American and West Indies Station ===
After the refit Comus recommissioned 6 April 1886 for service on the North American and West Indies Station. In 1889 the ship transported scientists to observe the total eclipse of the sun off western Africa, and noted astronomer Stephen Joseph Perry died aboard the vessel from dysentery contracted ashore.

=== 1895–1898 Return to the Pacific ===
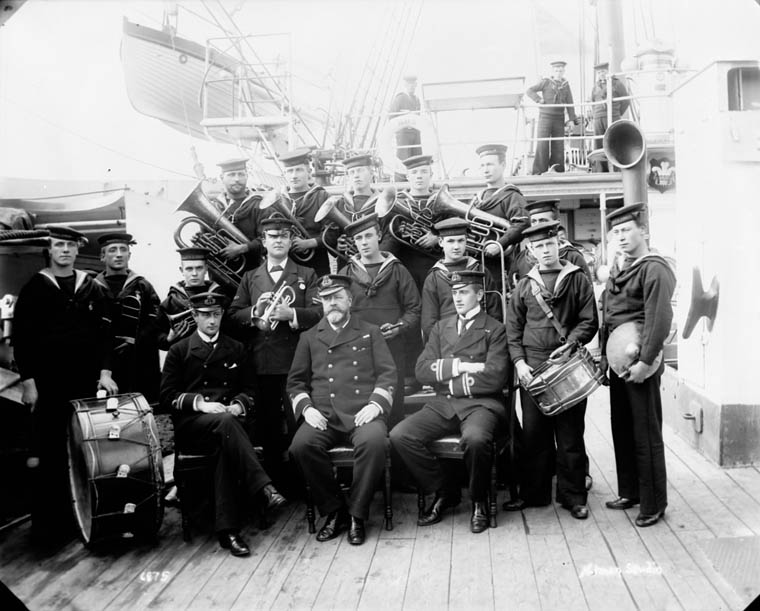
Members of the HMS Comus Band in Halifax in 1899.

In 1891 she returned to Britain and was again refitted and rearmed. On 1 October 1895 she recommissioned for service in the Pacific, and at the end of the year was reporting on lighthouses being erected by Chile in the Strait of Magellan. She saluted Alcatraz upon arrival in San Francisco 5 October 1896 while under the command of Captain H. H. Dyke. In 1897 Comus rescued shipwrecked sailors off Acapulco in July, called at Honolulu, Hawaii in September, and visited Pitcairn Island in the south Pacific in November. The ship then returned home to be placed in reserve.

=== 1898–1900 Return to North American and West Indies Station ===
Later in 1898 the ship was reassigned to the North American and West Indies station. Comus engaged in fisheries protection, and was in Halifax, Nova Scotia in 1899, and in the West Indies near Trinidad in early 1900 under the command of Captain George Augustus Giffard. In late February 1900 she was ordered to return to Britain, where her officers and crew were turned over to HMS Charybdis, which took the place of Comus on the North America and West Indies Station. On her way home she visited the Azores Islands in March 1900.

=== 1900–1904 Retirement and scrapping ===
Comus paid off at Devonport on 31 March 1900, and was stricken in 1902. The ship was sold 17 May 1904 for £3625, and was broken up at Barrow by Messrs Thos. W. Ward.

== Principal sources ==
- Archibald, E.H.H. (1971). The Metal Fighting Ship in the Royal Navy 1860–1970. Ray Woodward (illust.). New York: Arco Publishing Co. ISBN 0-668-02509-3.
- Colledge, J. J.; Warlow, Ben (2006) [1969]. Ships of the Royal Navy: The Complete Record of All Fighting Ships of the Royal Navy from the 15th Century to the Present (3rd Rev ed.). London: Chatham Publishing. ISBN 978-1-86176-281-8. OCLC 67375475.
- Elgar, Francis (1881). The Royal Navy; 1872–80, in a Series of Illustrations. W. F. Mitchell (illust.). Portsmouth: Griffin & Co.
- Osbon, G. A. (1963). "Passing of the steam and sail corvette: the Comus and Calliope classes". Mariner's Mirror. 49 (3). London: Society for Nautical Research: 193–208. doi:10.1080/00253359.1963.10657732. ISSN 0025-3359.
- Lyon, David & Winfield, Rif (2004). The Sail and Steam Navy List: All the Ships of the Royal Navy 1815–1889. Chatham Publishing. ISBN 978-1-86176-032-6. OCLC 52620555.
