= HMS Curacoa (1878) =

Comus-class corvette of the British Royal Navy

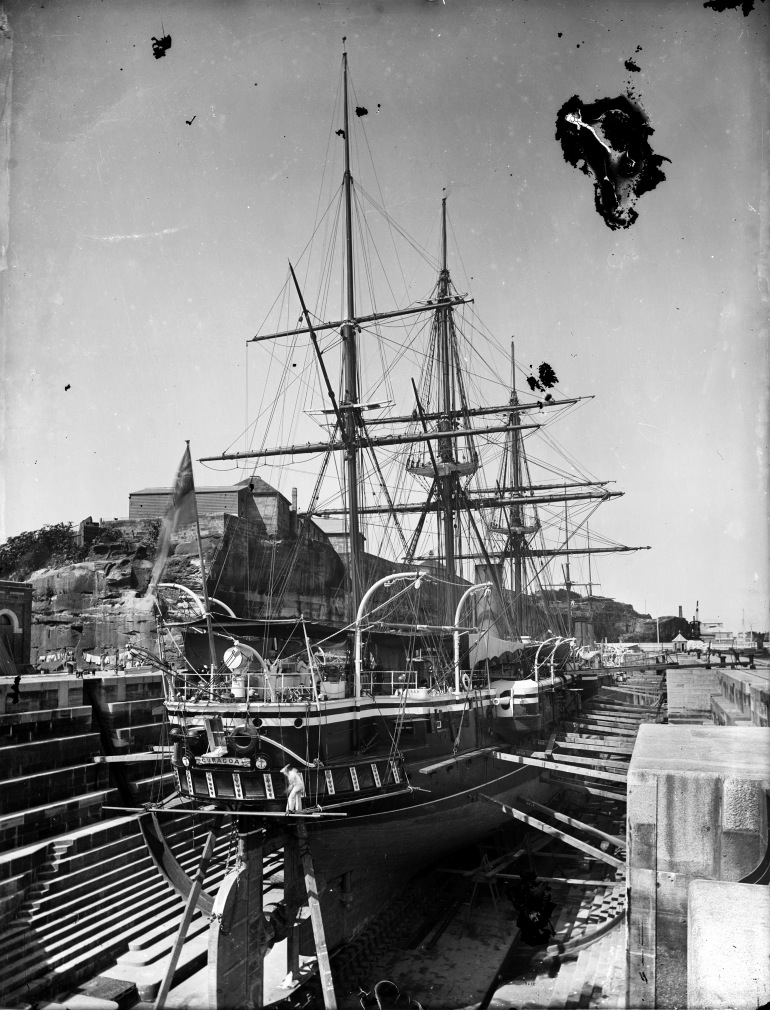
- HMS Curacoa drydocked in Sydney Harbour c. 1890

History

United Kingdom
- Name: Curacoa
- Builder: John Elder & Co., Govan
- Yard number: 210
- Launched: 18 April 1878
- Fate: Sold 1904 for breaking up

General characteristics
- Class & type: Comus-class corvette
- Displacement: 2,380 LT (2,420 t; 2,670 ST)
- Length: 225 ft (69 m)
- Beam: 44 ft (13 m)
- Draught: 19 ft (6 m)
- Propulsion: Single screw driven by compound engines of 2,590 ihp (1.93 MW)
- Sail plan: Barque or ship rig
- Speed: 13.75 kt (25.5 km/h) powered; 14.75 kt (27.3 km/h)
- Armament: (As built); Curacoa to Constance: 2 × 7-inch muzzle-loading rifles; 12 × 64-pounder muzzle-loading rifles; 2 × light guns; 8 × QF Nordenfelt guns; 2 × torpedo carriages
- Armour: Deck: 1.5 in (38 mm) over engines

HMS Curacoa was a Comus-class corvette of the Royal Navy, built by John Elder & Co., Govan, launched in 1878, and sold in 1904 to be broken up. She served on the Cape of Good Hope and West Africa Station, the Australia Station and as a training cruiser in the Atlantic.

== Service history ==
HMS Curacoa was built by John Elder & Co., Govan, and launched on 18 April 1878. She was the third Royal Navy ship to be named after the island of Curaçao, at that time still commonly known as "Curacoa" by English speakers.

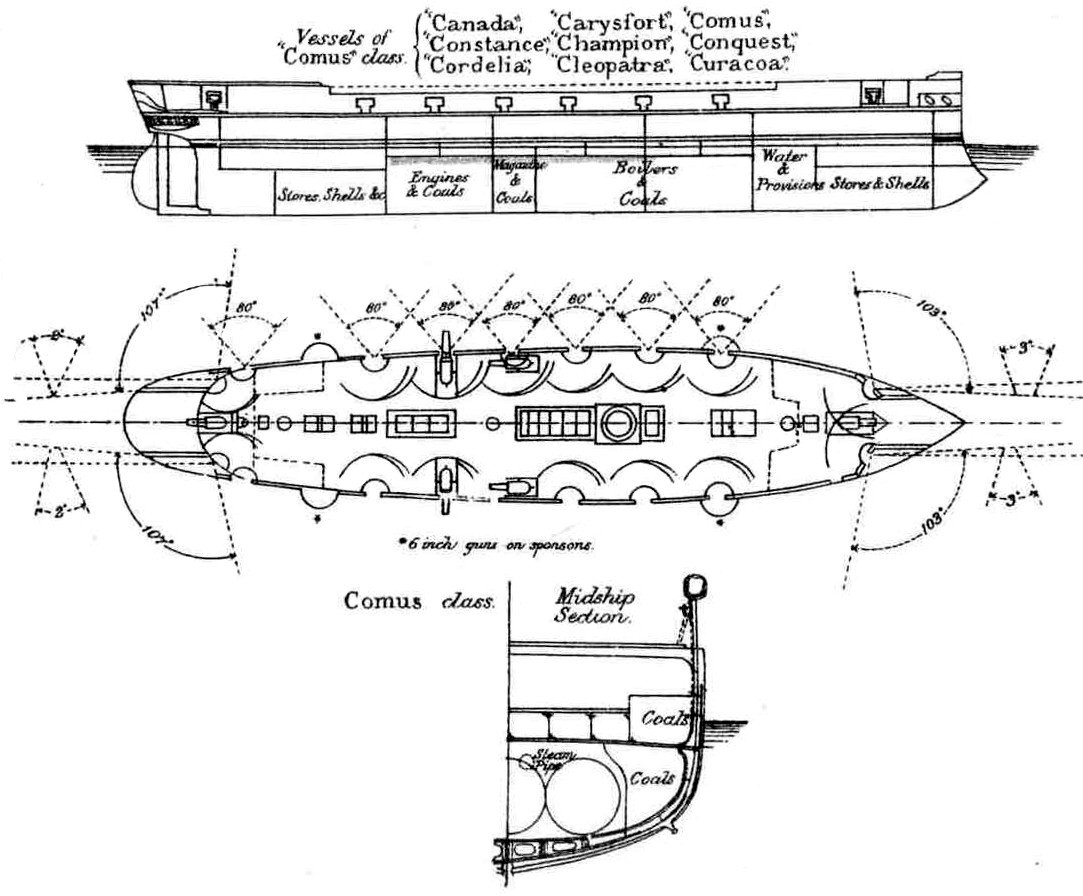
Deck plan, elevation, and hull cross-section of Comus-class vessels.

The corvette commenced service on the Cape of Good Hope and West Africa Station before being transferred to the Australia Station arriving on 5 August 1890. She left the Australia Station in December 1894.

Curacoa was sent to the Ellice Islands and between 9 and 16 October 1892 Captain Herbert Gibson visited each of the islands to make a formal declaration that the islands were to be a British Protectorate. In June 1893 Captain Gibson visited the southern Solomon Islands and made the formal declaration of the British Solomon Islands Protectorate.

Her later years were spent as a training cruiser. In January 1899, the battleship HMS Collingwood collided with Curacoa outside Devonport; the Curacoa was heavily damaged and several compartments in the hull flooded before the watertight doors could be closed. In February–April 1900 she visited Madeira, Las Palmas, São Vicente, Cape Verde, Gibraltar and Arosa Bay.

She was sold in May 1904 to King of Garston for breaking up.
