= Poop deck =

Deck over a cabin at the rear of a ship

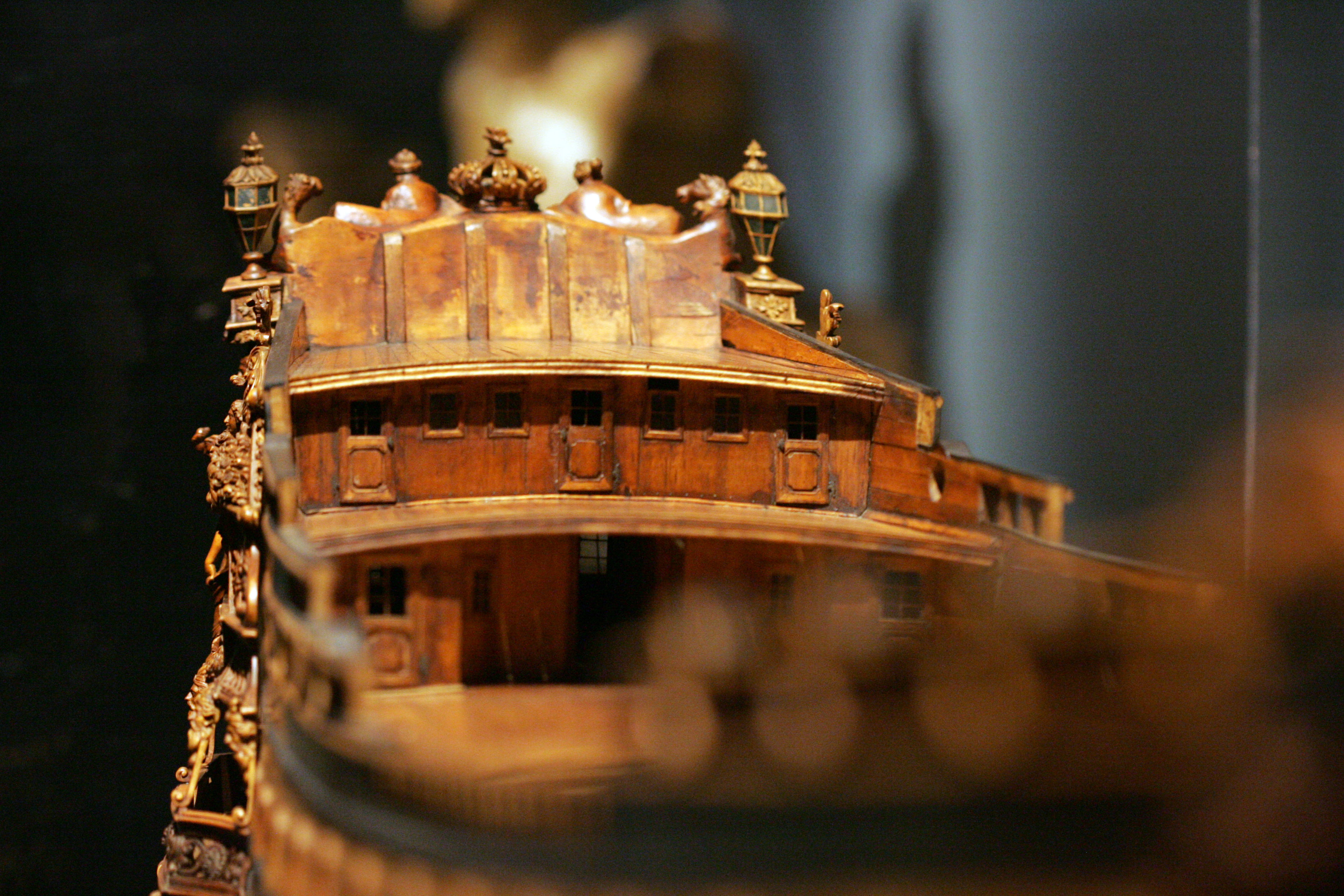
Poop deck of a model of the Soleil-Royal, as seen from the forecastle

In naval architecture, a poop deck is a deck that forms the roof of a cabin built in the rear, or stern, part of the superstructure of a ship.

The name originates from the French word for stern, poupe, from Latin puppis. Thus the poop deck is technically a stern deck, which in sailing ships was usually elevated as the roof of the stern or "after" cabin, also known as the "poop cabin" (or simply the poop). On sailing ships, the helmsman would steer the craft from the quarterdeck, immediately in front of the poop deck. At the stern, the poop deck provides an elevated position ideal for observation. The cabin was also used as an accommodation for the shipmaster and officers. On modern, motorized warships, the ship functions which were once carried out on the poop deck have been moved to the bridge, usually located in a superstructure.

The term "poop" in "poop deck" is etymologically unrelated to the homonymous English word for feces—nevertheless, such homophony allows for wordplay between these terms, which has been featured in works of fiction with nautical elements. On the episode "London's Apprentice" of Disney sitcom The Suite Life on Deck, for example, cruise ship manager Marion Moseby reacts to the installation of a toilet in the middle of his ship's deck with the exclamation "This is a sky deck, not a poop deck!"

== See also ==
- Common names for decks
- Taffrail, the handrail around the poop deck
- Quarter gallery, a projecting area at the stern
- Puppis, a constellation

== Sources ==
- Kerchove, René de baron (1961). International Maritime Dictionary: An Encyclopedic Dictionary of Useful Maritime Terms and Phrases, Together with Equivalents in French and German (2nd ed.). New York: Van Nostrand Reinhold. p. 598. OCLC 9324405.
