= The Sail and Steam Navy List =

2004 British historical reference work

The Sail and Steam Navy List 1815-1889
- Rif Winfield and David Lyon (2004) The Sail and Steam Navy List, 1815 - 1889, London: Chatham
- Author: Rif Winfield and David Lyon
- Language: English
- Subject: Vessels of the Nineteenth Century Royal Navy
- Publisher: Chatham Publishing
- Publication date: 2004
- Pages: 352
- ISBN: 978-1-86176-032-6
- OCLC: 52620555
- Dewey Decimal: 623.825094109034 21
- LC Class: VA456 .L95 2004

The Sail and Steam Navy List: All the Ships of the Royal Navy 1815–1889 by Rif Winfield and David Lyon is a historical reference work providing details of all recorded ships in commission or intended to serve in the Royal Navy from 1815 to 1889. Where available in Admiralty records (from which all the data is sourced), it gives the location of construction, dates of construction (ordering, keel laying, launch and commissioning), principal dimensions and tonnage, armament, machinery (for steam vessels) and fate of every ship of the Royal Navy over the period.

David Lyon's The Sailing Navy List: All the Ships of the Royal Navy, Built, Purchased and Captured, 1688-1860 had been published in 1993, a ground-breaking study of the sailing vessels of the Royal Navy from the Glorious Revolution of 1688 until the close of the Age of Sail. He had planned a follow-up on the ships of the Royal Navy in the era of transition from sail to steam power, and began work in preparation for that volume. This was cut short by his death in a diving accident during 2000 in the Bahamas (he was an enthusiastic underwater archaeologist). Shortly after his death, his colleague Rif Winfield, author of the best-selling Fifty Gun Ship, and subsequently the author of a series of volumes under the heading British Warships in the Age of Sail, took over David's accumulated notes, added them to his own extensive research on Royal Naval warships, and carried on this work to produce what the Journal for Maritime Research described as

the most comprehensive and accurate work on all the ships built and projected for the Royal Navy between 1815 and 1889; indeed up until now there was no single, comprehensive listing of the ships of this period and their essential characteristics

— Journal for Maritime Research

The book is a valuable reference work and the only complete single-volume published record for ships of the late Georgian era (1714–1837) and of the early (1837–1860) and middle (1860–1889) Victorian Royal Navy. Rif Winfield's subsequent four-volume British Warships in the Age of Sail series has expanded this material to incorporate all vessels of the British (before 1704, English) Navy between 1603 and 1863, and incorporated the results of extra research since the publication of their Sail and Steam Navy List.

== See also ==
- List of Royal Navy ships
