= Newfoundland Royal Naval Reserve =

- Active: 1900-1921
- Country: Newfoundland Colony (1900-1907); Dominion of Newfoundland (1907-1921)
- Type: military reserve force
- Role: naval
- Part of: Royal Naval Reserve
- Garrison/HQ: St. John's

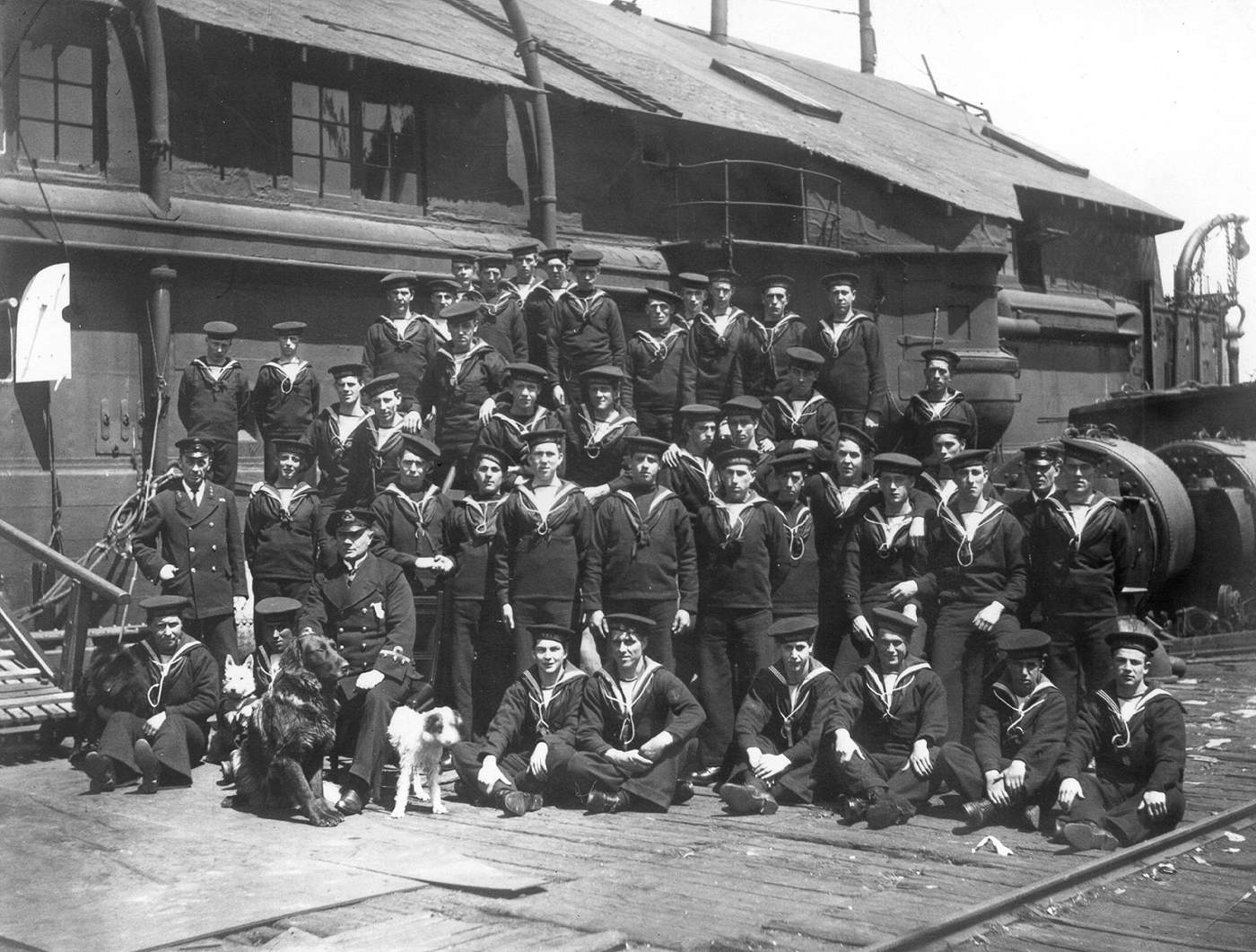
Members of the Newfoundland Royal Naval Reserve in front of their ship, HMS Calypso, wharfside at St. Johns.

The Newfoundland Royal Naval Reserve was a military reserve force founded in 1900 in what was then the Newfoundland Colony, a part of the British Empire. From 1900 to 1902, approximately 50 members of the reserve trained each winter with the North American and West Indies squadron of the Royal Navy until a steam and sail powered training ship, HMS Calypso, was provided by the United Kingdom in 1902 for local drills before at-sea training with the NA and WI squadron. The reserve had 375 members by late 1903 and then between five and six hundred reservists until the start of World War I, growing to over 1000 in 1915. 1,964 Newfoundlanders served with the Naval Reserve in World War I, suffering 192 fatalities. The Reserve disbanded in 1920-1921. Calypso, having been renamed HMS Briton, was sold as a storage hulk and was burned for salvage near Lewisporte, Newfoundland and Labrador.

== Establishment of the Reserve ==
The Naval Reserve was established in 1900 with the government paying for the expenses of men who came to St. John's for 28 days of training on board HMS Calypso. The vessel was to have been berthed at Argentia, but Sir Cavendish Boyle, the governor, suggested that most people, crew and citizens alike, would appreciate having the ship docked in St. John's. After their training, the men were to be available for service for five years. Similar Reserves were formed in other countries and colonies of the British Empire.

== Contributions during World War I ==
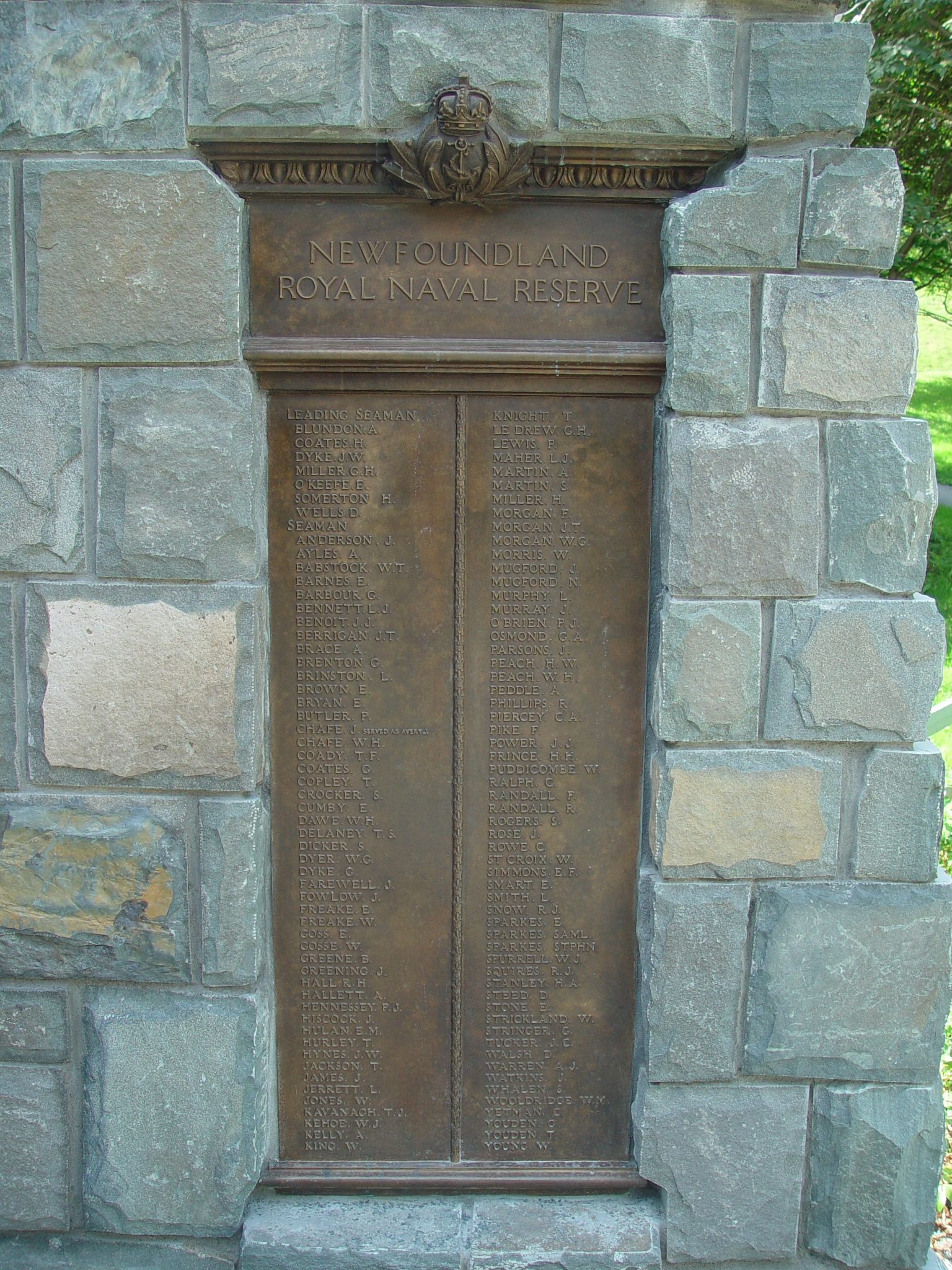
A plaque listing the names of the members of the Newfoundland Royal Naval Reserve who died during World War I and have no known grave.

When World War I began Walter Edward Davidson, the governor of Newfoundland, committed to increasing the Reserve to 1000 men, and to do so relaxed some of the age and health requirements for joining. In less than a year that number was exceeded. Unlike the Royal Newfoundland Regiment, which served as an intact unit, the men of the Naval Reserve were dispersed throughout the Royal Navy. A list of those who served with the Naval Reserve between 1914 and 1918 is available on-line. The members of the Naval Reserve are represented by a sailor holding a spyglass on the west wing of the Newfoundland National War Memorial in St. John's. Members of the Reserve who died during the war are honoured at the Beaumont-Hamel Newfoundland Memorial in France. Sir Winston Churchill remarked that the Newfoundlanders were "the best small boat men in the world".
