= Torpedo carriage =

Naval weapon

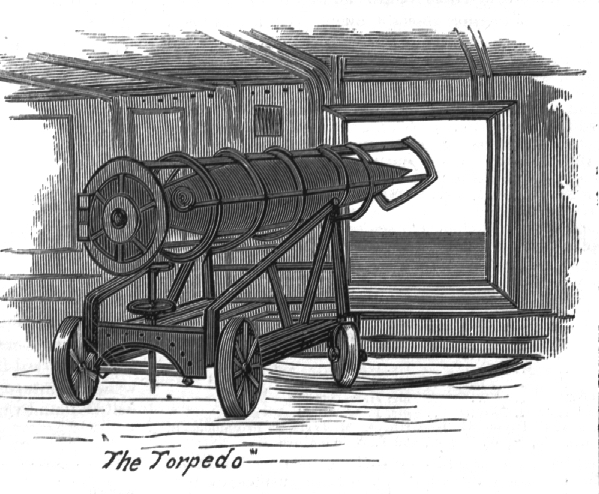
Engraving of a torpedo carriage and torpedo port onboard HMS Inconstant in 1884

The torpedo carriage was a torpedo launcher used during the late 19th century. The carriage was mounted onto the deck of warships, often cruisers, to efficiently launch torpedoes without damage. Compared to torpedo tubes which had little mobility, a torpedo carriage could easily be moved and fired out of torpedo ports on opposite sides of a warship.

== History ==
When the Whitehead torpedo began to be equipped to warships, a method was needed to launch the weapon. Initial methods of dropping the torpedo into the water were unsatisfactory as the impact with the water's surface damaged the internal mechanisms, which caused the torpedo to have an erratic and unpredictable course. The torpedo carriage was intended to solve this issue. It initially used compressed air to propel a rod that launched a torpedo overboard. However, this solution had similar issues as the rod's impact had a tendence to damage the rudders and propeller, and later iterations used gunpowder. The carriage was mounted on a ball joint, allowing a wide arc of fire out of specially designed torpedo ports instead of gun ports. Carriages could be moved across the deck, and were commonly situated to be swung to either side of the ship. The Royal Navy during the Victorian era equipped torpedo cruisers and small cruisers with torpedo carriages on the deck and fixed torpedo tubes under the waterline.
