= RML 64-pounder gun =

RML 64-pounder gun denotes one of several British rifled muzzle-loading artillery pieces which fired a 64-pound projectile.

Guns of this type differ by their weight, expressed in hundredweight (cwt), and whether they were built from scratch or converted from existing smoothbore guns. They include:

- RML 64-pounder 58 cwt, a gun for land use converted from the smoothbore 32 pounder 58 cwt gun
- RML 64-pounder 64 cwt gun, a gun for land and naval use, scratch-built rather than converted from a smoothbore
- RML 64-pounder 71 cwt gun, a gun for land and naval use converted from the smoothbore ML 8-inch shell gun
