= Quarter gallery =

Feature of sailing ships

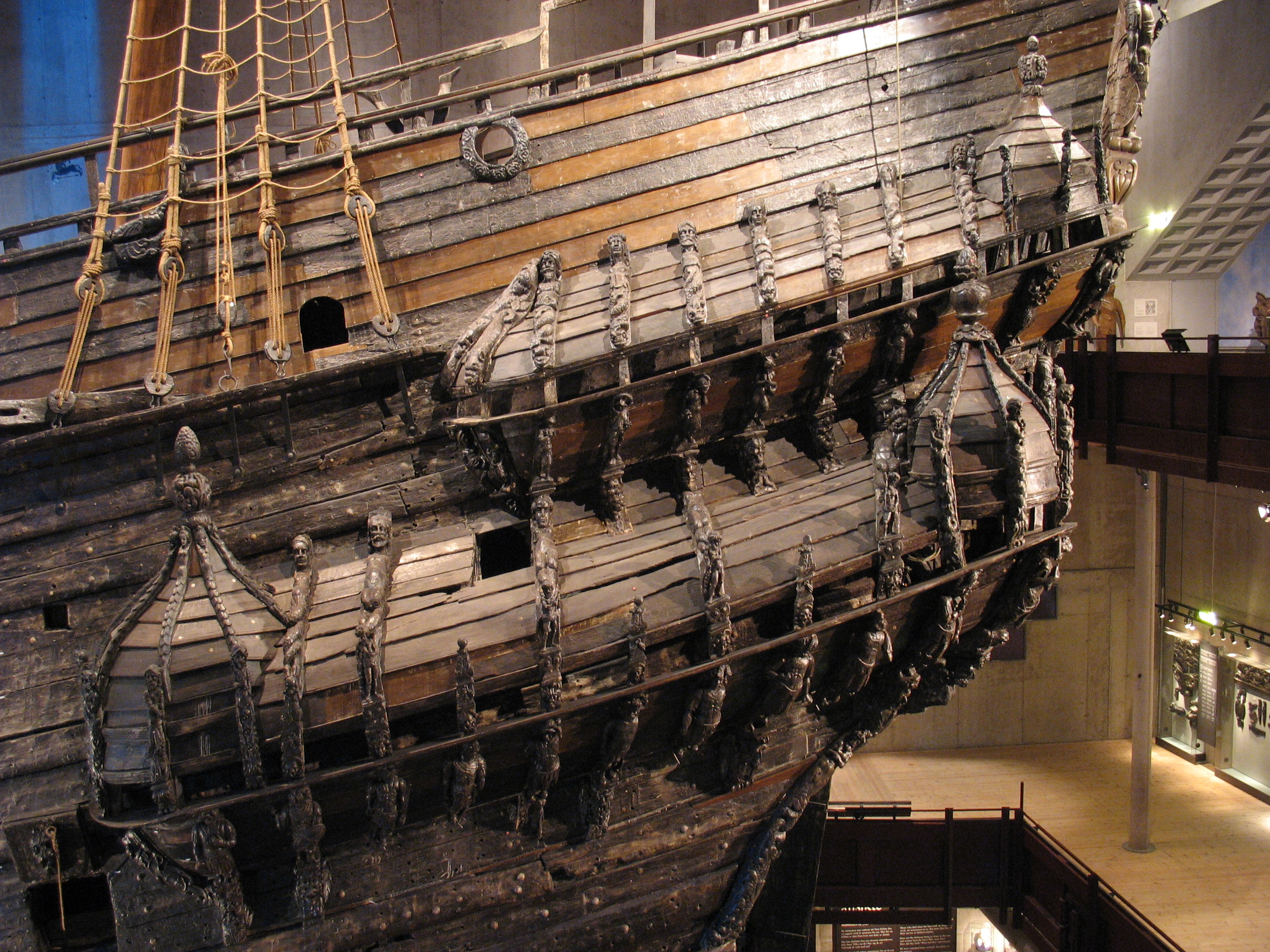
The port quarter galleries of the 17th century warship Vasa. The galleries alone have over 70 highly ornate wooden sculptures of varying themes and size, all of which were originally painted in bright, vivid colors.

A quarter gallery is an architectural feature of the stern of a sailing ship from around the 16th to the 19th century. Quarter galleries are a kind of balcony, typically placed on the sides of the sterncastle, the high, tower-like structure at the back of a ship that housed the officer's quarters. They functioned primarily as latrines for the ship's officers, and in inclement weather they also afforded those officers a view of the forward sails of the ship without having to go outside. On certain vessels and under certain conditions, the quarter galleries could serve as a firing platform for the ship's marines and sharpshooters during boarding actions. The galleries also provided a structure that was ideally suited for attaching decoration and often bore carved wooden sculptures, particularly in the 17th century.

As small, wing-like extensions of the stern, the quarter galleries were difficult to secure to the hull and in rough weather were sometimes torn from it completely. Quarter galleries were only fitted on vessels of war.
