= William Oswald Story =

Royal Navy and Royal Canadian Navy Admiral (1859–1938)

Admiral William Story CBE
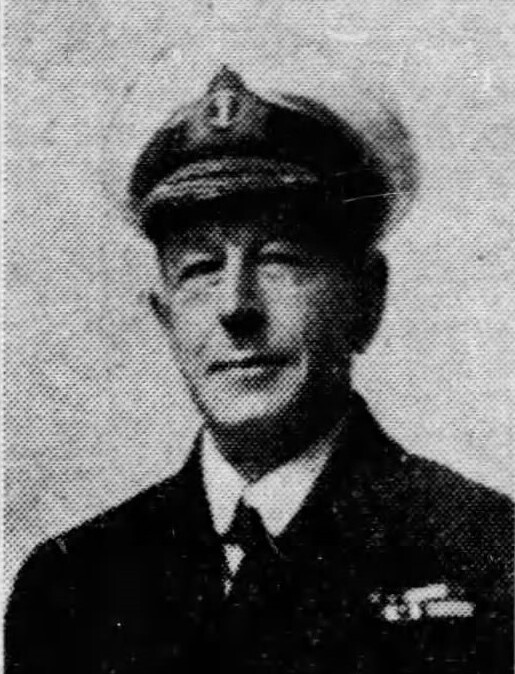
- Born: 18 April 1859; Bingfield, County Cavan
- Died: 14 January 1938 (aged 78); Montreal
- Burial place: Notre Dame des Neiges Cemetery
- Spouse: Olave Baldwin (m. 1891)
- Military career
- Allegiance: United Kingdom
- Branch: Royal Navy; Royal Canadian Navy
- Service years: 1872–1912 (RN); 1914–1919 (RCN)
- Commands: HMS Hearty; HMS Narcissus; HMS Grafton; HMS Cumberland; HMS London; HMS Canopus; Eastern Coast Guard District; Esquimalt Dockyard; West Coast; Halifax Dockyard
- Conflicts: Perak Expedition; Anglo-Egyptian War; Suakin Expedition; First World War
- Awards: Legion of Honour (France); Order of the Rising Sun (Japan); Order of Naval Merit (Spain)

Admiral William Oswald Story CBE (18 April 1859 – 14 January 1938) was a senior Royal Navy and Royal Canadian Navy officer.

== Biography ==
The son of Joseph Story, of Bingfield, County Cavan, William Oswald Story joined the Royal Navy in 1872, joining the Britannia as a cadet. As a midshipman in HMS Modeste, he took part in the Perak Expedition of 1875–76. He then took part in the Anglo-Egyptian War of 1882 as a sub-lieutenant on the gunboat HMS Mosquito and commanded a landing party at Chalof, for which he was specially commended in despatches and specially promoted to lieutenant the same year. He again saw service in the Suakin Expedition of 1884, as a lieutenant on HMS Dryad.

Promoted to commander in 1896 and captain in 1902, Story successively commanded HMS Hearty from 1900 to 1902, HMS Narcissus from 1903 to 1905, HMS Grafton from 1905 to 1906, HMS Cumberland from 1906 to 1907, HMS London from 1907 to 1908, and HMS Canopus from 1908 to 1909. He was Rear-Admiral-in-Charge of the Eastern Coast Guard District from 1909 to 1911. He was promoted to rear-admiral in 1911 and retired at his own request in 1912, settling in Guelph, Ontario.

On the outbreak of the First World War in 1914, Story offered his services and was appointed Admiral-Superintendent, Esquimalt Dockyard, in the Royal Canadian Navy, as well as Senior Naval Officer West Coast. From 1918 to 1919, he was Admiral-Superintendent, Halifax Dockyard. He was promoted to vice-admiral on the Retired List in 1917 and admiral on the Retired List in 1919. For his service during the war, Story was appointed a CBE in 1920. He also received the French Legion of Honour, the Japanese Order of the Rising Sun, and the Spanish Order of Naval Merit.

In retirement, Story, the only full admiral living in Canada, eventually settled in Montreal, and was involved in various patriotic organisations until his death in 1938.

== Family ==
Story married Olave Janet Baldwin, daughter of Captain Baldwin of Dunedin, New Zealand, in 1891; they had three sons and seven daughters. One daughter, Mary Caroline Story, served in the United States Army during World War I as a telephone operator.
