= HMS Warspite (1884) =

Ship, 1886

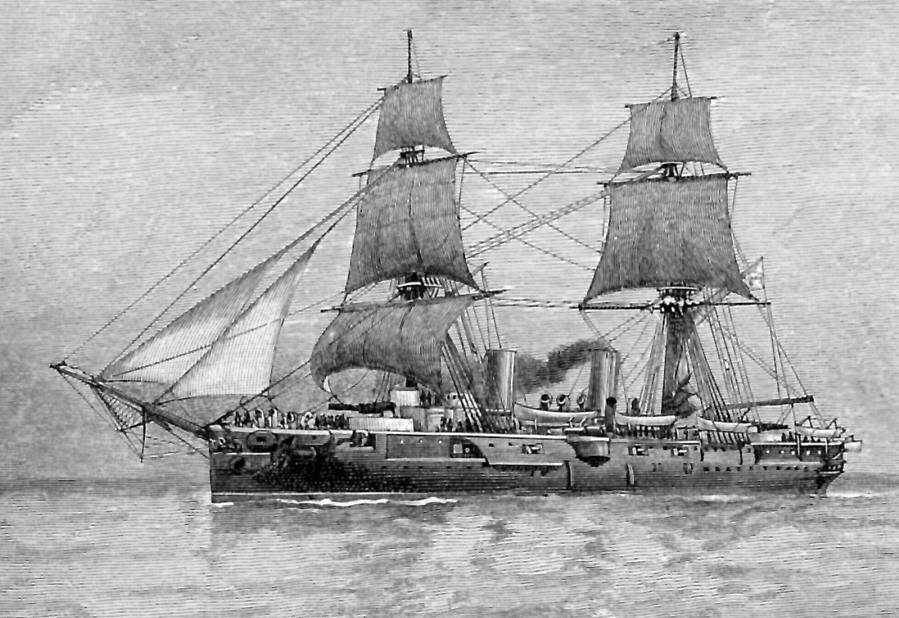
- HMS Warspite, about 1885, with her original 2 brig masts

History

United Kingdom
- Name: HMS Warspite
- Builder: Chatham Dockyard
- Laid down: 25 October 1881
- Launched: 29 January 1884
- Commissioned: 1886
- Fate: Sold for breaking up 4 April 1905

General characteristics
- Class & type: Imperieuse-class armoured cruiser
- Displacement: 8,400 long tons (8,500 t)
- Length: 315 ft (96 m) pp
- Beam: 62 ft (19 m)
- Draught: 26 ft 9 in (8.15 m)
- Propulsion: 2 Shaft Penn engine
- Speed: 16.75 knots (31.02 km/h)
- Complement: 555
- Armament: 4 × BL 9.2-inch (233.7 mm) Mk III guns; 6 × BL 6-inch (152.4 mm) guns; 6 × torpedo tubes
- Armour: Belt: 10 in (250 mm)

HMS Warspite was an Imperieuse-class first-class armoured cruiser, launched on 29 January 1884 and commissioned in 1886.

== Construction ==
Morris states that Warspite had her sailing rig removed while building. The illustration of her with masts therefore shows her on trials, or is conjectural.

== Service history ==
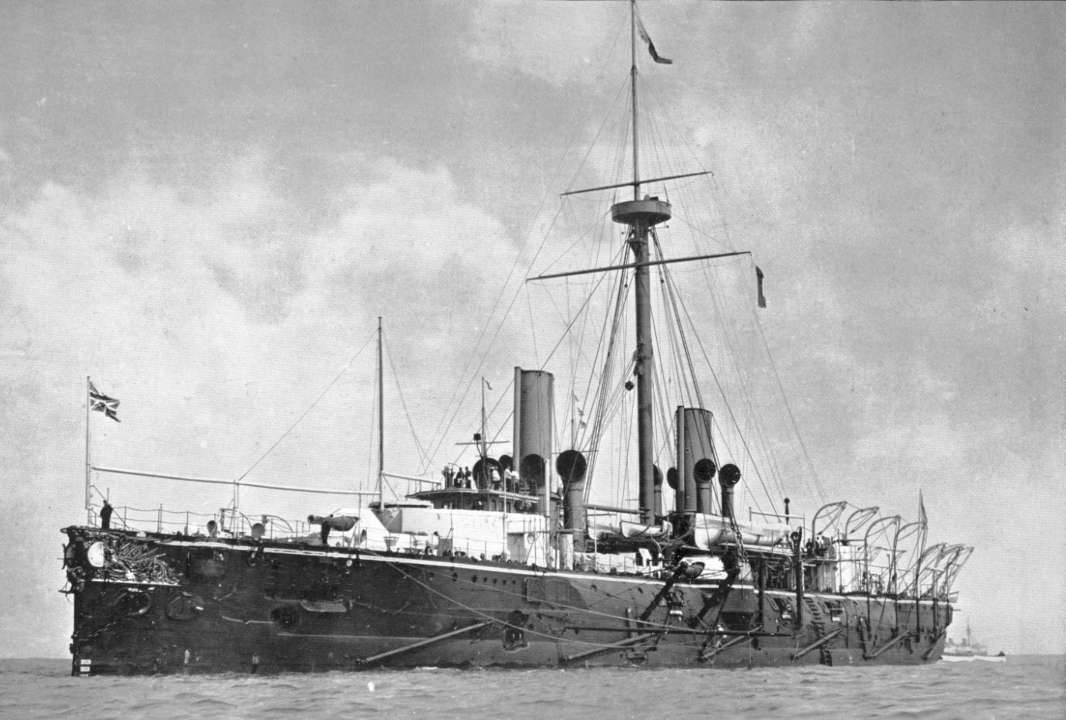
Warspite as she appeared later in her career, with a single military mast and sailing rig removed

Warspite was the flagship on the Pacific Station between 1890 and 1893, then a port guard ship at Queenstown until 1896. From 1896 until 1902 she again served as the flagship of the Pacific Station. Captain Thomas Philip Walker was appointed in command in March 1899, when Rear-Admiral Henry Palliser was Commander-in-Chief of the station. In June 1899 she became the flagship of Rear-Admiral Lewis Beaumont, who kept Captain Walker as flag captain. The ship visited Coquimbo in March 1900. From late 1900 she was the flagship of Rear-Admiral Andrew Bickford, with Captain Colin Richard Keppel as flag captain in command of the ship. In late March 1902, Rear-Admiral Bickford transferred his flag to the newly arrived HMS Grafton, and was joined by Captain Keppel. Warspite returned home under the command of Captain John Locke Marx (who had arrived on Grafton), stopping at Bahia and São Vicente, Cape Verde on the way. She arrived at Plymouth on 28 May 1902, and paid off at Chatham on 1 July, when she was placed in the D Division of the Dockyard reserve and prepared for emergency service.

She was sold on 4 April 1904 to Thos. W. Ward of Preston. She arrived on the River Mersey on 3 October 1905 and then travelled on to Preston for breaking up.

== Memorial ==
The Warspite Monument is a four-metre Celtic cross erected between 1891 and 1894 near Esquimalt Harbour, British Columbia. Made of granite believed to have been quarried in England, it served as a prominent landmark for vessels entering the harbour and appears on early nautical maps.

The monument commemorates four Royal Navy midshipmen from HMS Warspite:Ralph Caldwell, A. Alberic de Montmorency, Percival A. H. Brown, and Douglas C. Johnstone. The four were lost in a canoeing accident near Albert Head in July 1891 while on shore leave. The memorial was erected by their parents, and an additional plaque honoring the midshipmen is located in St. Ann’s Chapel in Portsmouth, England.

The monument is located on Esquimalt Graving Dock property and is not accessible to the public.
