= HMS Galatea (1887) =

Cruiser of the Royal Navy

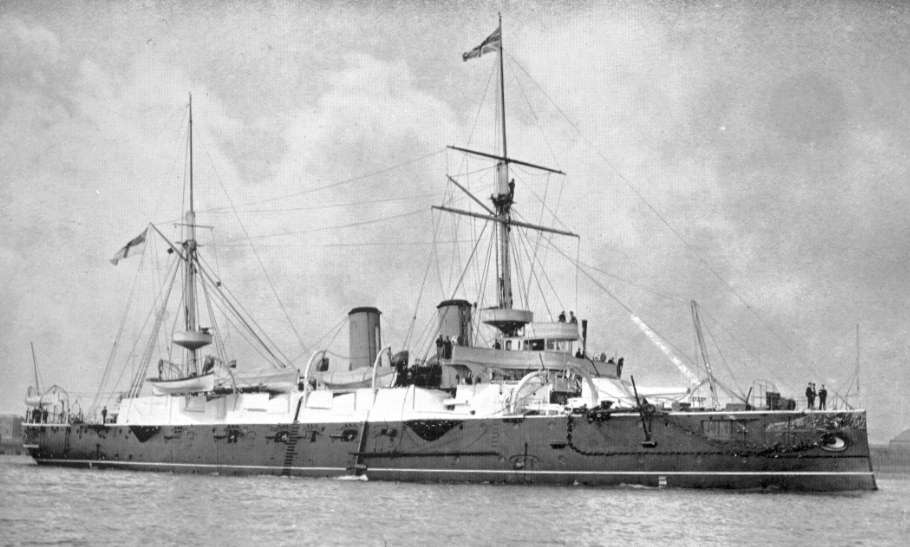

History

United Kingdom
- Name: HMS Galatea
- Builder: Robert Napier and Sons, Govan
- Laid down: 21 April 1885
- Launched: 10 March 1887
- Fate: Sold for breaking up 4 April 1905

General characteristics
- Class & type: Orlando-class armoured cruiser
- Displacement: 5,535 long tons (5,624 t)
- Length: 300 ft (91.4 m) (p/p)
- Beam: 56 ft (17.1 m)
- Draught: 24 ft (7.3 m)
- Installed power: 8,500 ihp (6,300 kW); 4 × boilers
- Propulsion: 2 shafts; 2 × Triple-expansion steam engines
- Speed: 18 kn (33 km/h; 21 mph)
- Range: 8,000 nmi (15,000 km; 9,200 mi) at 10 knots (19 km/h; 12 mph)
- Complement: 484
- Armament: 2 × single BL 9.2-inch (234 mm) Mk V guns; 10 × single BL 6-inch (152 mm) guns; 6 × single QF 6-pounder (57 mm) Hotchkiss guns; 10 × single QF 3-pounder (47 mm) Hotchkiss guns; 6 × 18-inch (450 mm) torpedo tubes
- Armour: Waterline belt: 10 in (254 mm); Deck: 2–3 in (51–76 mm); Conning tower: 12 in (305 mm); Bulkheads: 16 in (406 mm)

HMS Galatea was one of seven Orlando-class armoured cruisers built for the Royal Navy in the mid-1880s. She was sold for scrap on 5 April 1905.

== Design and description ==
Galatea had a length between perpendiculars of 300 feet (91.4 m), a beam of 56 feet (17.1 m) and a draught of 24 feet (7.3 m). Designed to displace 5,040 long tons (5,120 t), all of the Orlando-class ships proved to be overweight and displaced approximately 5,535 long tons (5,624 t). The ship was powered by a pair of three-cylinder triple-expansion steam engines, each driving one shaft, which were designed to produce a total of 8,500 indicated horsepower (6,300 kW) and a maximum speed of 18 knots (33 km/h; 21 mph) using steam provided by four boilers with forced draught. The ship carried a maximum of 900 long tons (910 t) of coal which was designed to give her a range of 8,000 nautical miles (15,000 km; 9,200 mi) at a speed of 10 knots (19 km/h; 12 mph). The ship's complement was 484 officers and ratings.

Galatea's main armament consisted of two breech-loading (BL) 9.2-inch (234 mm) Mk V guns, one gun fore and aft of the superstructure on pivot mounts. Her secondary armament was ten BL 6-inch (152 mm) guns, five on each broadside. Protection against torpedo boats was provided by six quick-firing (QF) 6-pounder Hotchkiss guns and ten QF 3-pounder Hotchkiss guns, most of which were mounted on the main deck in broadside positions. The ship was also armed with six 18-inch (457 mm) torpedo tubes: four on the broadside above water and one each in the bow and stern below water.

The ship was protected by a waterline compound armour belt 10 inches (254 mm) thick. It covered the middle 200 feet (61.0 m) of the ship and was 5 feet 6 inches (1.7 m) high. Because the ship was overweight, the top of the armour belt was 2 feet (0.61 m) below the waterline when she was fully loaded. The ends of the armour belt were closed off by transverse bulkheads 16 inches (406 mm). The lower deck was 2–3 inches (51–76 mm) thick over the full length of the hull. The conning tower was protected by 12 inches (305 mm) of armour.

== Construction and service ==
Galatea, named for the eponymous figure from Greek legend, was laid down on 21 April 1885 by Robert Napier and Sons at their shipyard in Govan, Glasgow. The ship was launched on 10 March 1887, and completed in March 1889.

She held a continuous commission as coast guard ship at Humber district based at Hull from 3 May 1893 until February 1903. On 12 May 1894, a six-pounder blank round exploded when Galatea was saluting ships of the German fleet at Firth of Forth. One of the ship's crew was killed and another badly injured, having to have an arm amputated. On the night of 10/11 February 1898, Galatea was at anchor on the Humber when the steamer Marbella, carrying a cargo of racehorses, collided with the cruiser. The steamer sank within ten minutes, but Marbella's crew and the single passenger safely evacuated to Galatea before the steamer sank, although all the racehorses were lost. Captain Charles Henry Cross was appointed in command in September 1898, and was briefly succeeded by Captain Richard William White in March–April 1900, during which she escorted the royal yacht Victoria and Albert with Queen Victoria on a visit to Ireland. From April that year Captain Robert Dalrymple Barwick Bruce was in command. She was under the command of Captain Robert Stevenson Dalton Cuming from February 1902 until February 1903, during which she took part in the fleet review held at Spithead on 16 August 1902 for the coronation of King Edward VII, and visited Copenhagen the following month. Captain Cuming paid her off at Chatham on 10 February 1903, when she was placed in the D Division of the Dockyard Reserve.
