= HMS Imperieuse (1883) =

Cruiser of the Royal Navy

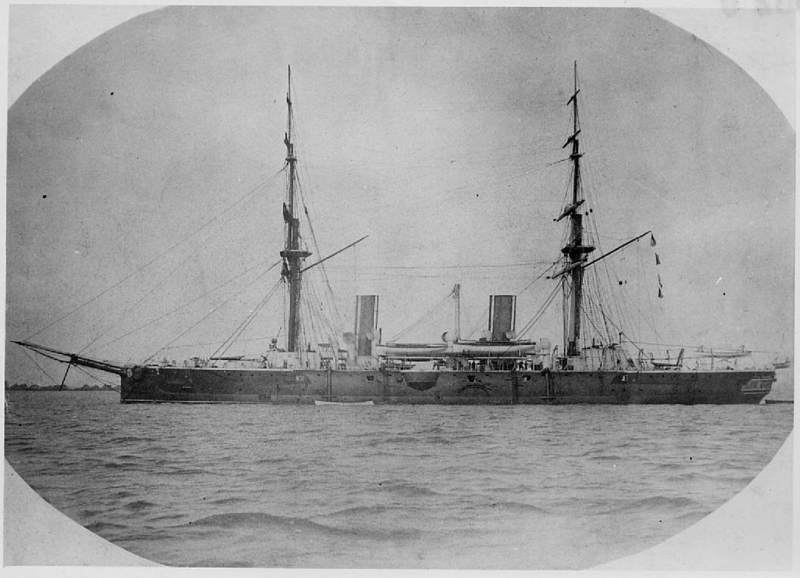
- HMS Imperieuse as commissioned

History

United Kingdom
- Name: HMS Imperieuse
- Builder: Portsmouth Royal Dockyard
- Laid down: 10 August 1881
- Launched: 18 December 1883
- Renamed: Sapphire II, February 1905; Imperieuse, June 1909
- Reclassified: Depot ship, February 1905
- Fate: Sold for scrap, 24 September 1913

General characteristics (after masts were removed)
- Class & type: Imperieuse-class armoured cruiser
- Displacement: 8,500 long tons (8,600 t)
- Length: 315 ft (96 m)
- Beam: 62 ft (19 m)
- Draught: 25 ft 9 in (7.8 m)
- Propulsion: 2 shafts, 2 compound-expansion steam engines
- Speed: 16 knots (30 km/h; 18 mph)
- Complement: 555
- Armament: 4 × BL 9.2-inch (233.7 mm) Mk III guns; 6 × BL 6-inch (152.4 mm) guns; 4 × torpedo tubes
- Armour: Belt: 10 in (254 mm)

HMS Imperieuse was the lead ship of her class of two armoured cruisers built for the Royal Navy in the 1880s. She was sold for scrap in 1913.

== Design and description ==
The Imperieuse-class ships were designed as enlarged and improved versions of the Nelson-class to counter the threat of enemy armoured ships encountered abroad. The ships had a length between perpendiculars of 315 feet (96.0 m), a beam of 62 feet (18.9 m) and a deep draught of 27 feet 3 inches (8.3 m). The ships were designed to displace 7,390 long tons (7,510 t), but displaced 8,500 long tons (8,600 t) as built, an increase of over 1,000 long tons (1,000 t). The steel-hulled ships were fitted with a ram and their hulls were sheathed in teak which was covered in copper to reduce biofouling. Their crew numbered approximately 555 officers and other ranks.

The ship had two 3-cylinder, inverted compound steam engines, each driving a single propeller, using steam provided by a dozen oval and cylindrical boilers. The engines produced 10,000 indicated horsepower (7,500 kW) used forced draught and Imperieuse reached 16.75 knots (31.02 km/h; 19.28 mph) on her sea trials. The Imperieuse-class ships carried a maximum of 1,130 long tons (1,150 t) of coal which gave them an economical range of 7,000 nautical miles (13,000 km; 8,100 mi) at a speed of 10 knots (19 km/h; 12 mph). The ship was initially brig-rigged with two masts, but these were replaced by a single military mast amidships shortly after completion as she proved to have very poor sailing qualities during her trials and to reduce weight by 100 long tons (102 t).

== Construction and career ==
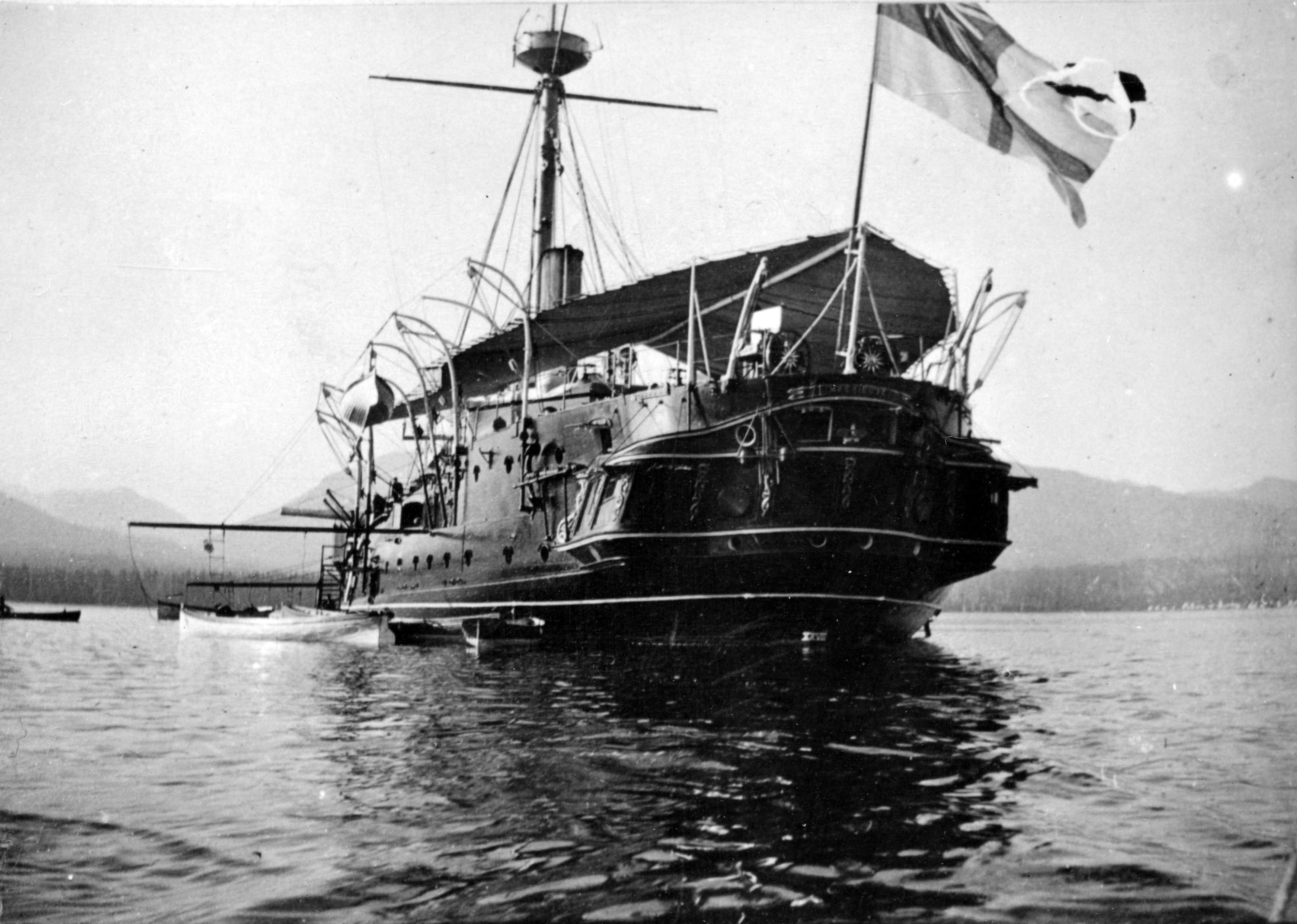
HMS Imperieuse at Vancouver.

Imperieuse was laid down at Portsmouth Royal Dockyard on 10 August 1881, launched on 18 December 1883, and completed in September 1886. She was the flagship of the China Station from 1889 to 1894 and the Pacific Station from 1896 to 1899. She underwent extensive repairs at Chatham in early 1900.

Imperieuse was renamed Sapphire II in February 1905 and reclassified as a depot ship for destroyers at Portland. Her name was reverted to Imperieuse in June 1909. She was sold on 24 September 1913 to Thos. W. Ward of Morecambe for breaking up.
