= HMS Undaunted (1886) =

Cruiser of the Royal Navy

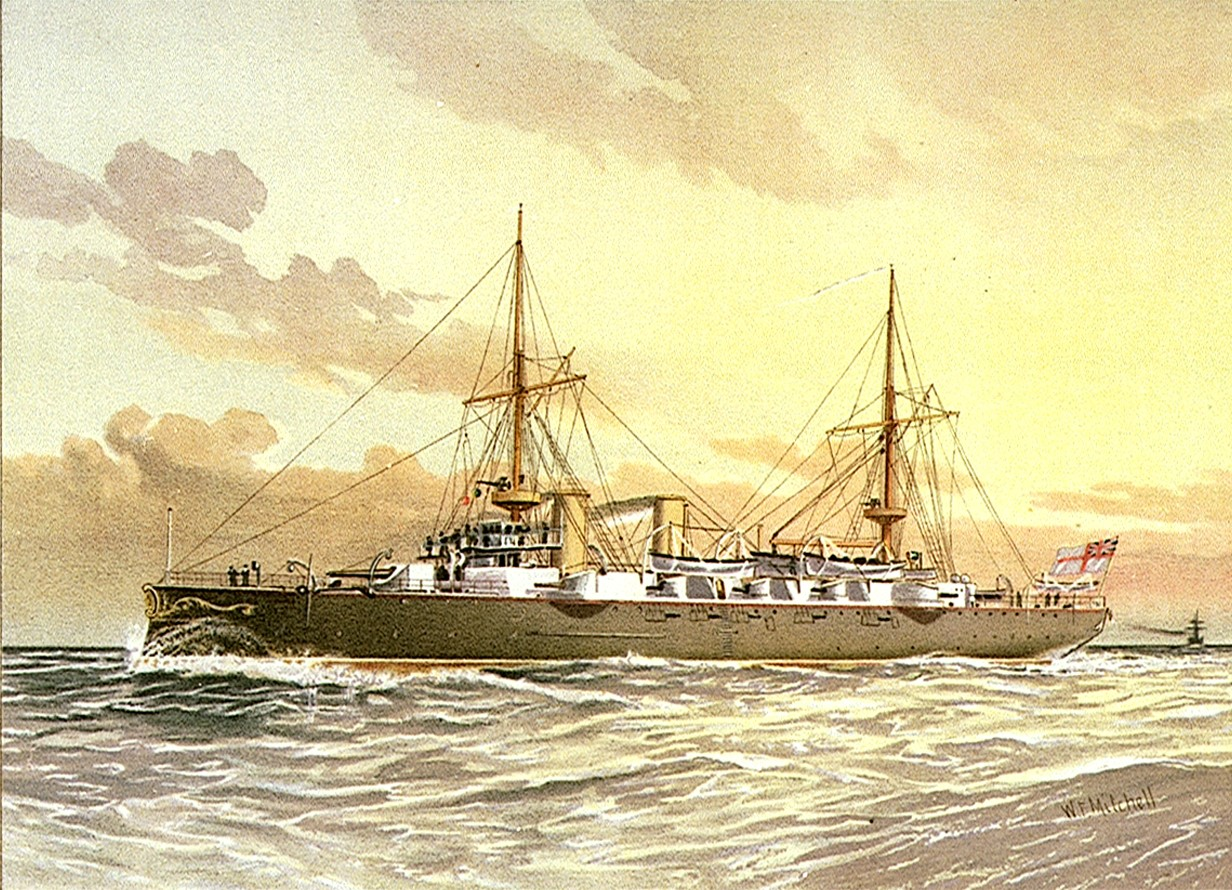
- HMS Undaunted

History

United Kingdom
- Name: HMS Undaunted
- Builder: Palmers Shipbuilding and Iron Company, Jarrow
- Laid down: 23 April 1885
- Launched: 25 November 1886
- Fate: Sold for breaking up 9 April 1907

General characteristics
- Class & type: Orlando-class armoured cruiser
- Displacement: 5,535 long tons (5,624 t)
- Length: 300 ft (91.4 m) (p/p)
- Beam: 56 ft (17.1 m)
- Draught: 24 ft (7.3 m)
- Installed power: 8,500 ihp (6,300 kW); 4 × boilers
- Propulsion: 2 shafts; 2 × Triple-expansion steam engines
- Speed: 18 kn (33 km/h; 21 mph)
- Range: 8,000 nmi (15,000 km; 9,200 mi) at 10 knots (19 km/h; 12 mph)
- Complement: 484
- Armament: 2 × single BL 9.2-inch (234 mm) Mk V guns; 10 × single BL 6-inch (152 mm) guns; 6 × single QF 6-pounder (57 mm) Hotchkiss guns; 10 × single QF 3-pounder (47 mm) Hotchkiss guns; 6 × 18-inch (450 mm) torpedo tubes
- Armour: Waterline belt: 10 in (254 mm); Deck: 2–3 in (51–76 mm); Conning tower: 12 in (305 mm); Bulkheads: 16 in (406 mm)

HMS Undaunted was one of seven Orlando-class armoured cruisers built for the Royal Navy in the mid-1880s.

== Design and description ==
Undaunted had a length between perpendiculars of 300 feet (91.4 m), a beam of 56 feet (17.1 m) and a draught of 24 feet (7.3 m). Designed to displace 5,040 long tons (5,120 t), all of the Orlando-class ships proved to be overweight and displaced approximately 5,535 long tons (5,624 t). The ship was powered by a pair of three-cylinder triple-expansion steam engines, each driving one shaft, which were designed to produce a total of 8,500 indicated horsepower (6,300 kW) and a maximum speed of 18 knots (33 km/h; 21 mph) using steam provided by four boilers with forced draught. During her sea trials, Undaunted reached 19.4 knots (35.9 km/h; 22.3 mph). The ship carried a maximum of 900 long tons (910 t) of coal which was designed to give her a range of 8,000 nautical miles (15,000 km; 9,200 mi) at a speed of 10 knots (19 km/h; 12 mph). The ship's complement was 484 officers and ratings.

Undaunted's main armament consisted of two breech-loading (BL) 9.2-inch (234 mm) Mk V guns, one gun fore and aft of the superstructure on pivot mounts. Her secondary armament was ten BL 6-inch (152 mm) guns, five on each broadside. Protection against torpedo boats was provided by six quick-firing (QF) 6-pounder Hotchkiss guns and ten QF 3-pounder Hotchkiss guns, most of which were mounted on the main deck in broadside positions. The ship was also armed with six 18-inch (457 mm) torpedo tubes: four on the broadside above water and one each in the bow and stern below water.

The ship was protected by a waterline compound armour belt 10 inches (254 mm) thick. It covered the middle 200 feet (61.0 m) of the ship and was 5 feet 6 inches (1.7 m) high. Because the ship was overweight, the top of the armour belt was 2 feet (0.61 m) below the waterline when she was fully loaded. The ends of the armour belt were closed off by transverse bulkheads 16 inches (406 mm). The lower deck was 2–3 inches (51–76 mm) thick over the full length of the hull. The conning tower was protected by 12 inches (305 mm) of armour.

== Construction and service ==
Undaunted was laid down on 23 April 1885 by Palmers at their shipyard in Jarrow. The ship was launched on 25 November 1886, and completed on 18 September 1890. It was under the command of Captain Lord Charles Bereford, his first command. She served with the Mediterranean fleet under overall command of Sir George Tryon.

On 21 March 1893, Undaunted, under the command of the then Rear Admiral Lord Charles Beresford struck rocks on leaving Alexandria harbour, owing to an error by the ship's navigation officer, who gave the order to turn to Port instead of Starboard. The ship received minor underwater damage in the impact.

She served two commissions on the China Station. On 25 April 1901, she was paid off at Devonport and placed in the Fleet Reserve, where she stayed for a year, until she was prepared to be commissioned as tender to HMS Cambridge, gunnery school ship at the dockyard. Captain Frederick Alexander Warden was appointed in command on her commission as tender on 26 August 1902. She was sold for scrapping on 9 April 1907 to Harris of Bristol.
