= HMS Aurora (1887) =

British Orlando-class armoured cruisers

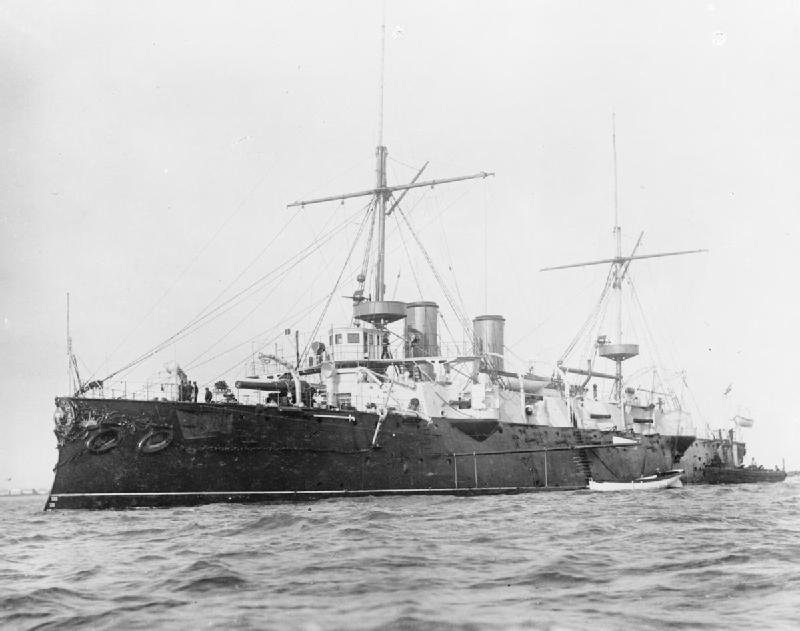
- Aurora at anchor

History

United Kingdom
- Name: HMS Aurora
- Builder: Pembroke Dockyard
- Laid down: 1 February 1886
- Launched: 28 October 1887
- Completed: July 1889
- Out of service: 1905
- Fate: Sold for scrap, 2 October 1907

General characteristics
- Class & type: Orlando-class armoured cruiser
- Displacement: 5,535 long tons (5,624 t)
- Length: 300 ft (91.4 m) (p/p)
- Beam: 56 ft (17.1 m)
- Draught: 24 ft (7.3 m)
- Installed power: 8,500 ihp (6,300 kW); 4 × boilers
- Propulsion: 2 shafts; 2 × Triple-expansion steam engines
- Speed: 18 kn (33 km/h; 21 mph)
- Range: 8,000 nmi (15,000 km; 9,200 mi) at 10 knots (19 km/h; 12 mph)
- Complement: 484
- Armament: 2 × single BL 9.2-inch (234 mm) Mk V guns; 10 × single BL 6-inch (152 mm) guns; 6 × single QF 6-pounder (57 mm) Hotchkiss guns; 10 × single QF 3-pounder (47 mm) Hotchkiss guns; 6 × 18-inch (450 mm) torpedo tubes
- Armour: Waterline belt: 10 in (254 mm); Deck: 2–3 in (51–76 mm); Conning tower: 12 in (305 mm); Bulkheads: 16 in (406 mm)

HMS Aurora was one of seven Orlando-class armoured cruisers built for the Royal Navy in the mid-1880s. The ship spent a brief time in reserve before she was assigned to the Channel Squadron for two years in 1890. In 1893 Aurora became a coast guard ship in Ireland for two years before she was placed in reserve again. The ship recommissioned in 1899 for service on the China Station and some of her crew participated in the Battle of Tientsin in 1900 during the Boxer Rebellion. Aurora returned home two years later and was again reduced to reserve. She was taken out of service in 1905 and sold for scrap on 2 October 1907.

== Design and description ==
The Orlando-class cruisers were enlarged versions of the Mersey class with more armour and a more powerful armament. Like their predecessors, they were intended to protect British shipping. Aurora had a length between perpendiculars of 300 feet (91.4 m), a beam of 56 feet (17.1 m) and a draught of 24 feet (7.3 m). Designed to displace 5,040 long tons (5,120 t), all of the Orlando-class ships proved to be overweight and displaced approximately 5,535 long tons (5,624 t). The ships were powered by a pair of three-cylinder triple-expansion steam engines, each driving one shaft, which were designed to produce a total of 8,500 indicated horsepower (6,300 kW) and a maximum speed of 18 knots (33 km/h; 21 mph) using steam provided by four boilers with forced draught. The ship carried a maximum of 900 long tons (910 t) of coal which was designed to give her a range of 8,000 nautical miles (15,000 km; 9,200 mi) at a speed of 10 knots (19 km/h; 12 mph). The ship's complement was 484 officers and ratings.

Aurora's main armament consisted of two breech-loading (BL) 9.2-inch (234 mm) Mk V guns, one gun fore and aft of the superstructure on pivot mounts. Her secondary armament was ten BL 6-inch (152 mm) guns, five on each broadside. Protection against torpedo boats was provided by six quick-firing (QF) 6-pounder Hotchkiss guns and ten QF 3-pounder Hotchkiss guns, most of which were mounted on the main deck in broadside positions. The ship was also armed with six 18-inch (457 mm) torpedo tubes: four on the broadside above water and one each in the bow and stern below water.

The ship was protected by a waterline compound armour belt 10 inches (254 mm) thick. It covered the middle 200 feet (61.0 m) of the ship and was 5 feet 6 inches (1.7 m) high. Because the ship was overweight, the top of the armour belt was 2 feet (0.61 m) below the waterline when she was fully loaded. The ends of the armour belt were closed off by transverse bulkheads 16 inches (406 mm). The lower deck was 2–3 inches (51–76 mm) thick over the full length of the hull. The conning tower was protected by 12 inches (305 mm) of armour.

== Construction and service ==
Aurora, named for the eponymous Roman goddess of the dawn, was the eighth ship of her name to serve in the Royal Navy. She was laid down on 1 February 1886 by Pembroke Dockyard. The ship was launched on 28 October 1887 by Mrs. Sophia Morant, wife of Captain George Morant, Captain-Superintendent of the dockyard and completed in July 1889 at a cost of £258,390.

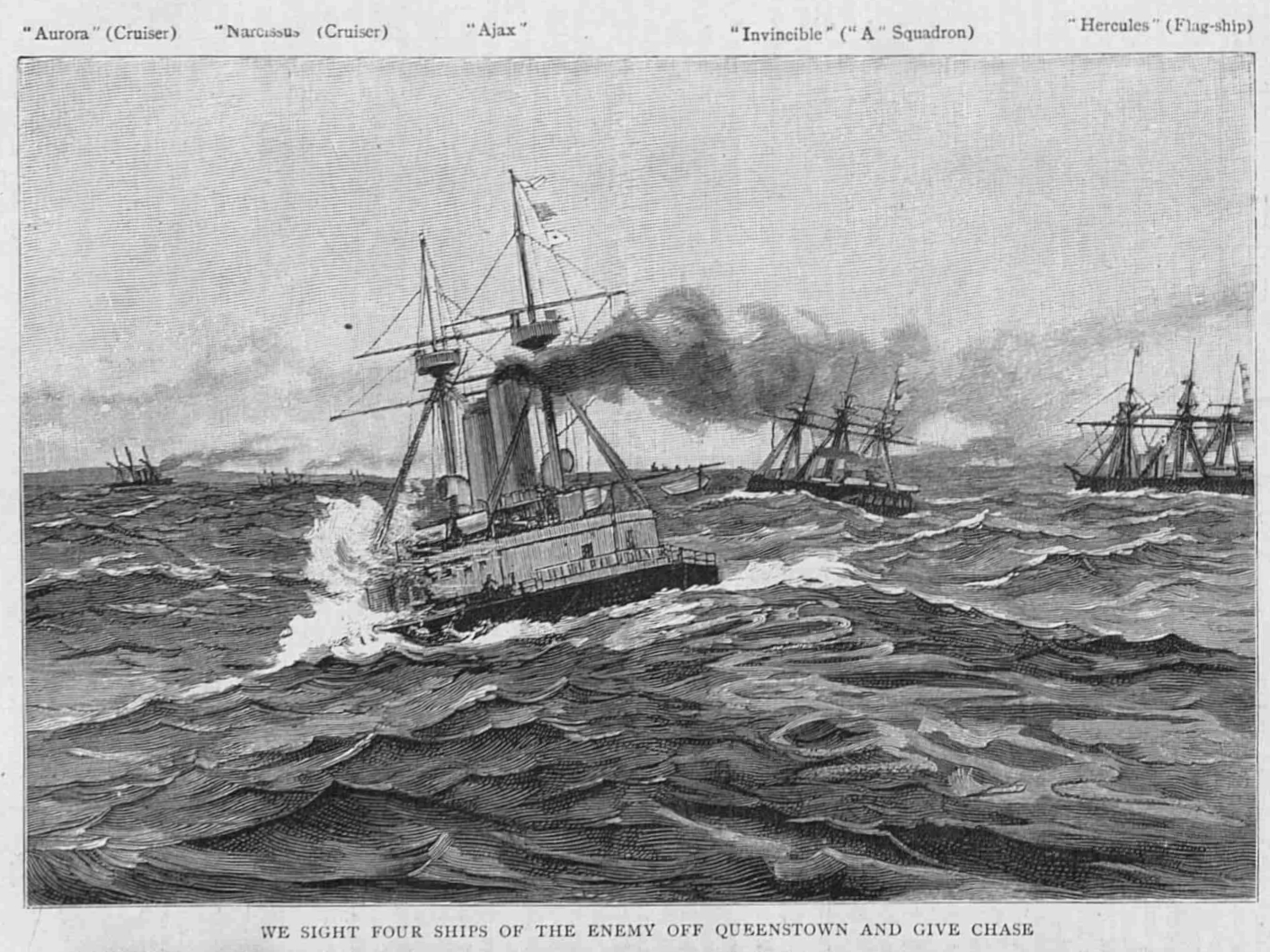
Aurora was at the August 1889 Naval Manoeuvres, in the Irish Sea, off Queenstown. The Graphic

Aurora went straight into reserve at Devonport after completion, but was commissioned for service with the Channel Squadron in 1890–92. She was transferred to Bantry, Ireland, in 1893 to serve as the local coastguard ship until 1895. That year the ship was reassigned to the Devonport Reserve and remained there until 1899. Aurora participated in Queen Victoria's Diamond Jubilee Fleet review on 26 June 1897 at Spithead.

Aurora was recommissioned for service in the Far East in 1899 under the command of Captain Edward Bayly and some of her crew, including Bayly, took part in the Battle of Tientsin in July 1900 during the Boxer Rebellion. In early February 1902 she was ordered to leave, homebound, arriving at Aden on 3 March, at Malta 17 March, and at Plymouth on 26 March. Officers and crew received the China War Medal (1900) on 15 April, before she paid off at Devonport two days later. Upon her return, Aurora left in August 1902 for Clydebank to be refitted, and was placed in Devonport Reserve in 1904 before she was taken out of service the following year. The ship was sold for scrap to Payton, of Milford Haven, Wales, on 2 October 1907 for £12,700.
