= Sackville Carden =

Royal Navy Admiral (1857–1930)

Admiral Sir Sackville Carden KCMG
- Born: Sackville Hamilton Carden; 3 May 1857; Templemore, Ireland
- Died: 6 May 1930 (aged 73); Lymington, England
- Military career
- Allegiance: United Kingdom
- Branch: Royal Navy
- Service years: 1870–1917
- Rank: Admiral
- Commands: Eastern Mediterranean Squadron; Malta Dockyard; HMS Immortalité; HMS Magnificent
- Conflicts: Anglo-Egyptian War; Mahdist War; Benin Expedition of 1897; First World War
- Awards: Knight Commander of the Order of St Michael and St George

Admiral Sir Sackville Hamilton Carden, KCMG (3 May 1857 – 6 May 1930) was a senior Royal Navy officer. He is chiefly remembered for his failure to force the Turkish defences in the Dardanelles during the First World War, which led to the launch of the ill-fated Gallipoli campaign.

== Early life and career ==
Carden was born in Barnane near Templemore in County Tipperary, Ireland, the third son of Captain Andrew Carden of the 60th Rifles and Anne Berkeley, eldest daughter of Lieutenant-General Sackville Hamilton Berkeley. Although both his father and grandfather had served in the British Army, he elected for a naval career and joined the Royal Navy in 1870.

Carden's early career was marked by service in Egypt and the Sudan and later, under Harry Rawson, in the Benin Expedition of 1897. He was promoted to captain in December 1899, and in May 1901 was commissioned in command of HMS Immortalité, seagoing tender to the Wildfire, flagship at Sheerness. He was on 16 October 1902 appointed in command of the battleship HMS Magnificent, serving as flagship to rear-admiral Assheton Curzon-Howe, second in command of the Channel Squadron, and took her to visit Gibraltar and Tetuan the following week. In 1908, he was promoted rear admiral.

After two years on half-pay, he was assigned to the Atlantic Fleet, and raised his flag aboard HMS London for one year. Following his return to London, he was posted to the Admiralty until August 1912, at which point he was appointed Admiral Superintendent of Malta Dockyard.

== First World War ==
In September 1914, he was appointed Commander of the Eastern Mediterranean Squadron operating in the Mediterranean, under the leadership of a French admiral. Following the Ottoman Empire's entry into the war on the side of the Central Powers in November 1914, Carden was asked by the British Admiralty to develop a strategy to force open the Dardanelles (Canakkale Bogazi) in January of the following year.

Carden's plan called for the systematic destruction of Turkish fortifications along the Dardanelles while advancing slowly up the strait, in addition to extensive minesweeping operations. Initially commander-in-chief of British naval forces during the Dardanelles campaign, Carden was successful in early offensives against Turkish defences from 19 February until early March, when he was relieved of command owing to his failing health and strain of anxiety which proved too much for him causing a nervous breakdown and was replaced by Admiral John de Robeck.

Resigning from the Royal Navy two years later with the rank of admiral, Carden lived in retirement until his death in 1930.

== Notes ==
Military offices
| Preceded by Ernest Simons | Admiral Superintendent, Malta Dockyard; 1912–1914 | Succeeded by Arthur Limpus |
