= HMS Narcissus (1886) =

Cruiser of the Royal Navy

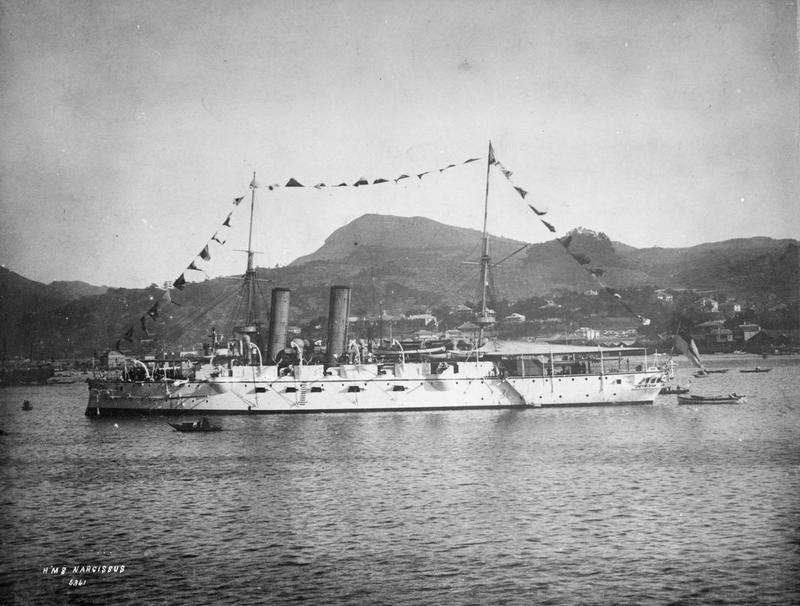

History

United Kingdom
- Name: HMS Narcissus
- Builder: Earle's Shipbuilding, Hull
- Laid down: 27 April 1885
- Launched: 15 December 1886
- Fate: Sold for breaking up, 11 September 1906

General characteristics
- Class & type: Orlando-class armoured cruiser
- Displacement: 5,535 long tons (5,624 t)
- Length: 300 ft (91.4 m) (p/p)
- Beam: 56 ft (17.1 m)
- Draught: 24 ft (7.3 m)
- Installed power: 8,500 ihp (6,300 kW); 4 × boilers
- Propulsion: 2 shafts; 2 × Triple-expansion steam engines
- Speed: 18 kn (33 km/h; 21 mph)
- Range: 8,000 nmi (15,000 km; 9,200 mi) at 10 knots (19 km/h; 12 mph)
- Complement: 484
- Armament: 2 × single BL 9.2-inch (234 mm) Mk V guns; 10 × single BL 6-inch (152 mm) guns; 6 × single QF 6 pounder (57 mm) Hotchkiss guns; 10 × single QF 3 pounder (47 mm) Hotchkiss guns; 6 × 18-inch (450 mm) torpedo tubes
- Armour: Waterline belt: 10 in (254 mm); Deck: 2–3 in (51–76 mm); Conning tower: 12 in (305 mm); Bulkheads: 16 in (406 mm)

HMS Narcissus was one of seven Orlando-class armoured cruisers built for the Royal Navy in the mid-1880s. Future Admiral Ernest Gaunt served aboard her in 1896 as First Lieutenant. She was sold for scrapping on 11 September 1906.

== Design and description ==
Narcissus had a length between perpendiculars of 300 feet (91.4 m), a beam of 56 feet (17.1 m) and a draught of 24 feet (7.3 m). Designed to displace 5,040 long tons (5,120 t), all of the Orlando-class ships proved to be overweight and displaced approximately 5,535 long tons (5,624 t). The ship was powered by a pair of three-cylinder triple-expansion steam engines, each driving one shaft, which were designed to produce a total of 8,500 indicated horsepower (6,300 kW) and a maximum speed of 18 knots (33 km/h; 21 mph) using steam provided by four boilers with forced draught. The ship carried a maximum of 900 long tons (910 t) of coal which was designed to give her a range of 8,000 nautical miles (15,000 km; 9,200 mi) at a speed of 10 knots (19 km/h; 12 mph). The ship's complement was 484 officers and ratings.

Narcissus's main armament consisted of two breech-loading (BL) 9.2-inch (234 mm) Mk V guns, one gun fore and aft of the superstructure on pivot mounts. Her secondary armament was ten BL 6-inch (152 mm) guns, five on each broadside. Protection against torpedo boats was provided by six quick-firing (QF) 6-pounder Hotchkiss guns and ten QF 3-pounder Hotchkiss guns, most of which were mounted on the main deck in broadside positions. The ship was also armed with six 18-inch (457 mm) torpedo tubes: four on the broadside above water and one each in the bow and stern below water.

The ship was protected by a waterline compound armour belt 10 inches (254 mm) thick. It covered the middle 200 feet (61.0 m) of the ship and was 5 feet 6 inches (1.7 m) high. Because the ship was overweight, the top of the armour belt was 2 feet (0.61 m) below the waterline when she was fully loaded. The ends of the armour belt were closed off by transverse bulkheads 16 inches (406 mm). The lower deck was 2–3 inches (51–76 mm) thick over the full length of the hull. The conning tower was protected by 12 inches (305 mm) of armour.

== Construction and service ==
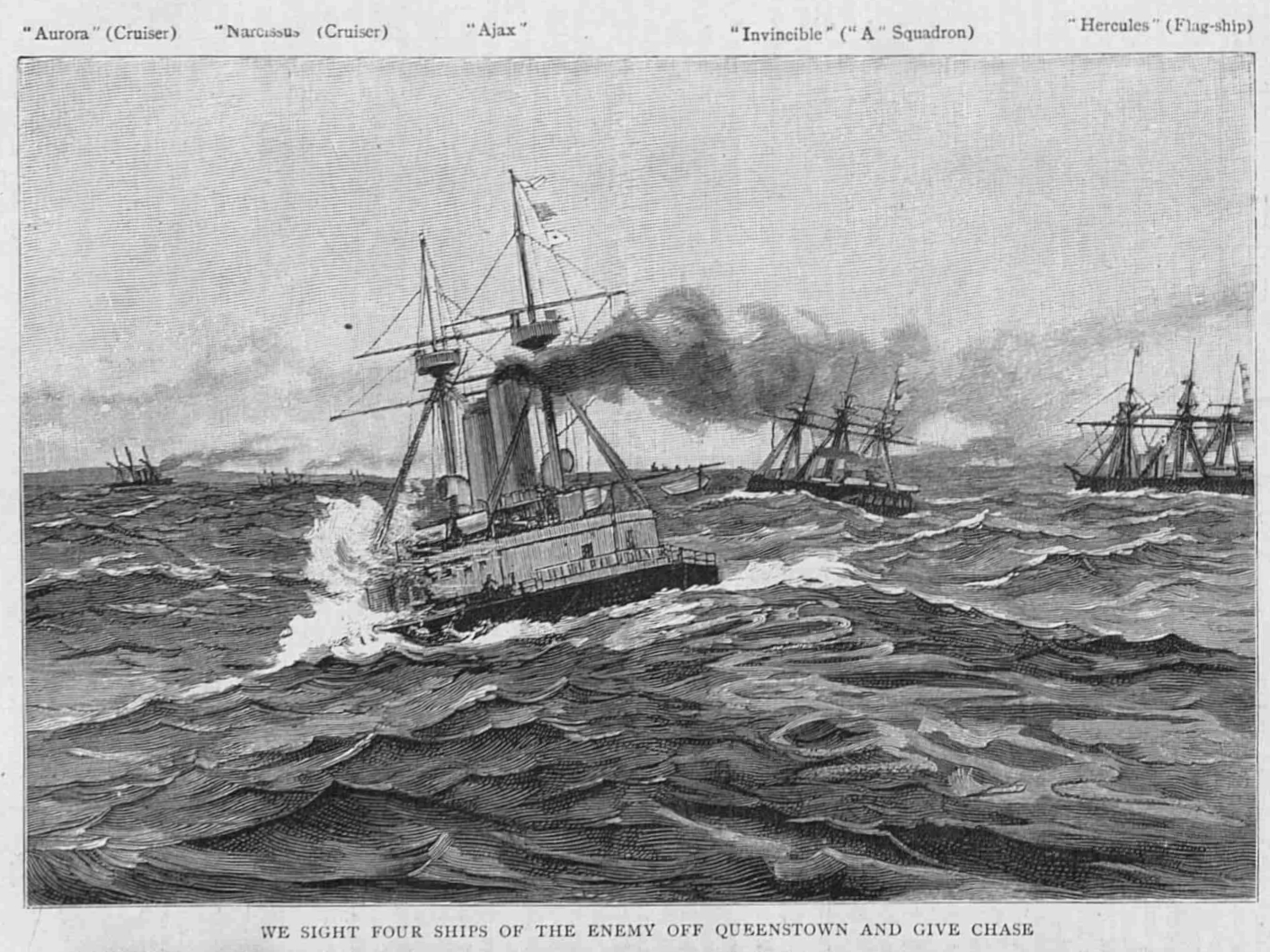
Narcissus was at the 1889 Naval Manoeuvres, in the Irish Sea, off Queenstown. The Graphic

Narcissus, named for the eponymous figure from Greek legend, was laid down on 27 April 1885 by Earle's Shipbuilding at their shipyard in Hull. The ship was launched on 15 December 1886, and completed in July 1890.

In 1901 she was rearmed and refitted to serve as instructional tender to the Excellent gunnery school, and in late May 1901 was passed into the Fleet Reserve at Portsmouth for this service. She took part in the fleet review held at Spithead on 16 August 1902 for the coronation of King Edward VII, and on 1 September that year became flagship of the Admiral-superintendent of Portsmouth, when Rear-Admiral Reginald Friend Hannam Henderson hoisted his flag on taking up that position.

Narcissus was sold for scrap on 11 September 1906 and broken up by Thos. W. Ward.
