= Orlando-class cruiser =

1887 class of British armored cruisers

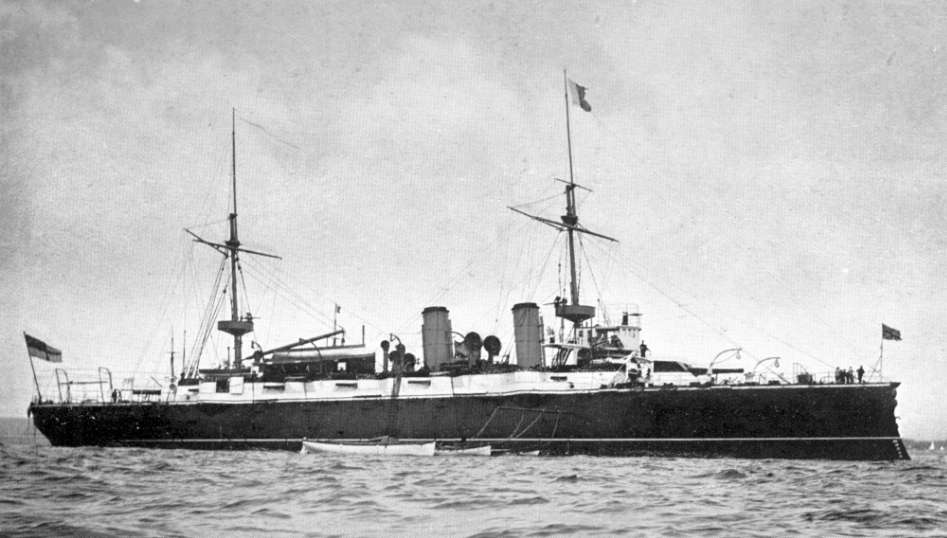
- HMS Orlando

Class overview
- Name: Orlando class
- Operators: Royal Navy
- Preceded by: Imperieuse class
- Succeeded by: Blake class
- Built: 1885–1889
- In commission: 1887–1906
- Completed: 7
- Retired: 7

General characteristics
- Type: First class armoured cruiser
- Displacement: 5,600 tonnes (5,500 long tons)
- Length: 300 ft (91 m)
- Beam: 56 ft (17 m)
- Draught: 22.5 ft (6.9 m)
- Installed power: 5,500 hp (4,100 kW); 8,500 hp (6,300 kW) forced-draught
- Propulsion: 3-cylinder triple-extension steam engines; two shafts; 4 double-ended boilers
- Speed: 17 knots (31 km/h) natural draught; 18 knots (33 km/h) forced draught
- Range: 10,000 nautical miles (19,000 km) at 10 knots (19 km/h)
- Complement: 484
- Armament: 2 × BL 9.2-inch (233.7 mm) Mk V or VI guns (2 x 1); 10 × BL 6-inch (152.4 mm) guns (10 x 1); 6 × QF 6-pounder (57 mm) guns (6 × 1); 10 × QF 3-pounder (47 mm) Hotchkiss guns (10 × 1); 6 × 18-inch (450-mm) torpedo tubes (4 above water broadside, 1 bow and 1 stern submerged)
- Armour: Belt: 10 in (250 mm); Conning tower: 12 in (300 mm)

The Orlando class was a seven-ship class of Royal Navy armoured cruisers completed between 1888 and 1889.

== Building Programme ==
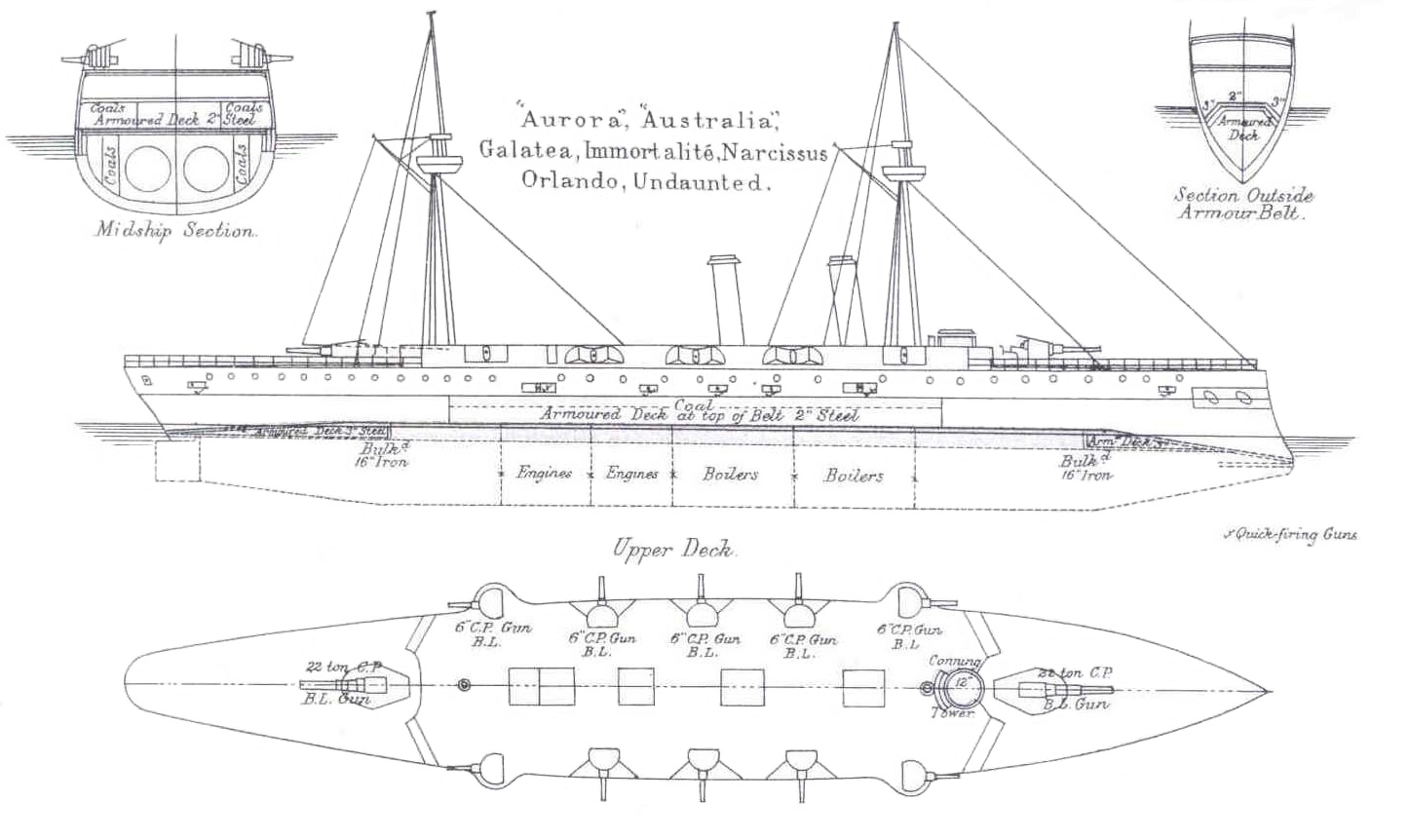
Right elevation and deck plan as depicted in Brassey's naval annual 1888

On 2 December 1884, the Secretary to the Admiralty stated, "The present Board have been gradually developing, and, as I would venture to say, in an effective manner, our resources for the protection of commerce. The late Board of Admiralty laid down an admirable type for the purpose in the Leander class. We have followed in their footsteps by producing the Mersey type, and we now propose to go a step further in the same direction, by laying down vessels of the Mersey class, but protected by a belt in lieu of an armoured deck. The belt will, I think, be approved by my hon. Friend who sits behind me (Sir Edward J. Reed)." These belted cruisers were the Orlando class.

The following table gives the build details and purchase cost of the members of the Orlando class. Standard British practice at that time was for these costs to exclude armament and stores. In the table:

- Machinery meant "propelling machinery".
- Hull included "hydraulic machinery, gun mountings, etc."

Ship	Builder	Maker of Engines	Date of			Cost according to			
Ship	Builder	Maker of Engines	Laid Down	Launch	Completion	(BNA 1895)			(BNA 1903)
Ship	Builder	Maker of Engines	Laid Down	Launch	Completion	Hull	Machinery	Total excluding armament	(BNA 1903)
Orlando	Palmers, Jarrow		23 Apr 1885	3 Aug 1886	June 1888	£206,647	£60,165	£266,812	£303,065
Aurora	Pembroke Dockyard	J&G Thompson	1 Feb 1886	28 Oct 1887	July 1889	£220,550	£64,000	£284,550	£326,110
Australia	Fairfield Shipbuilding and Engineering, Govan	C & W Earle	21 Apr 1885	25 Nov 1886	October 1888	£195,390	£63,000	£258,390	£299,027
Galatea	Robert Napier and Sons, Govan		21 Apr 1885	10 Mar 1887	March 1889	£195,390	£63,000	£258,390	£291,803
Immortalite	Chatham Dockyard	C & W Earle	18 Jan 1886	7 Jul 1887	July 1889	£221,500	£57,000	£278,500	£332,359
Narcissus	C & W Earle, Hull		27 Apr 1885	15 Dec 1886	July 1889	£195,890	£61,500	£257,390	£300,149
Undaunted	Palmers, Jarrow		23 Apr 1885	25 Nov 1886	July 1889	£195,890	£60,165	£256,055	£300,863

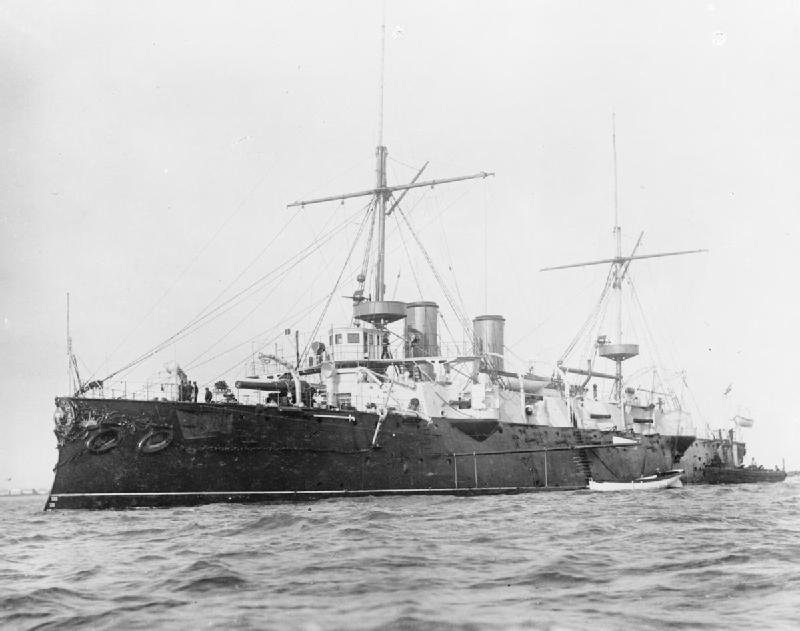
HMS Aurora

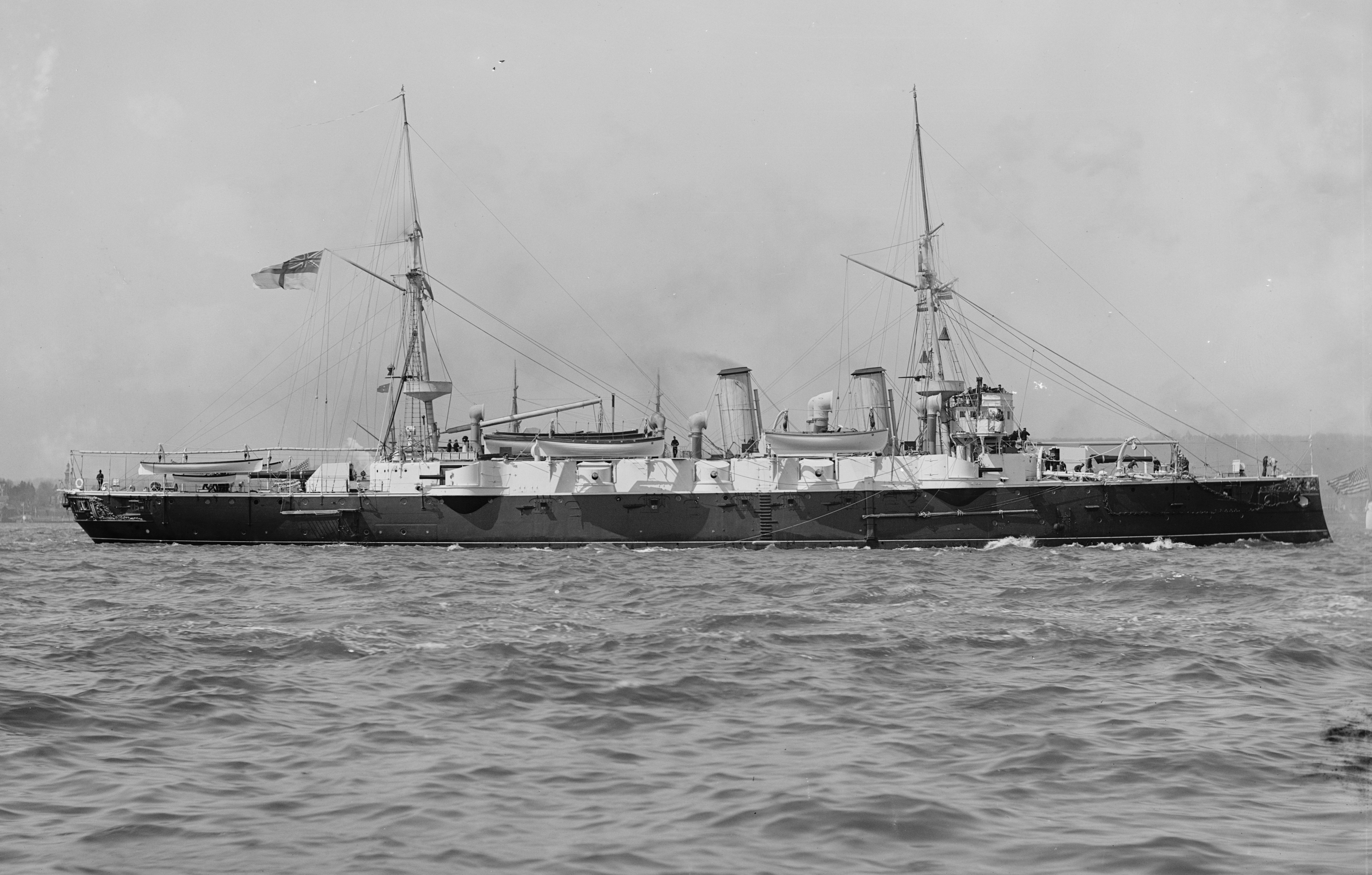
HMS Australia

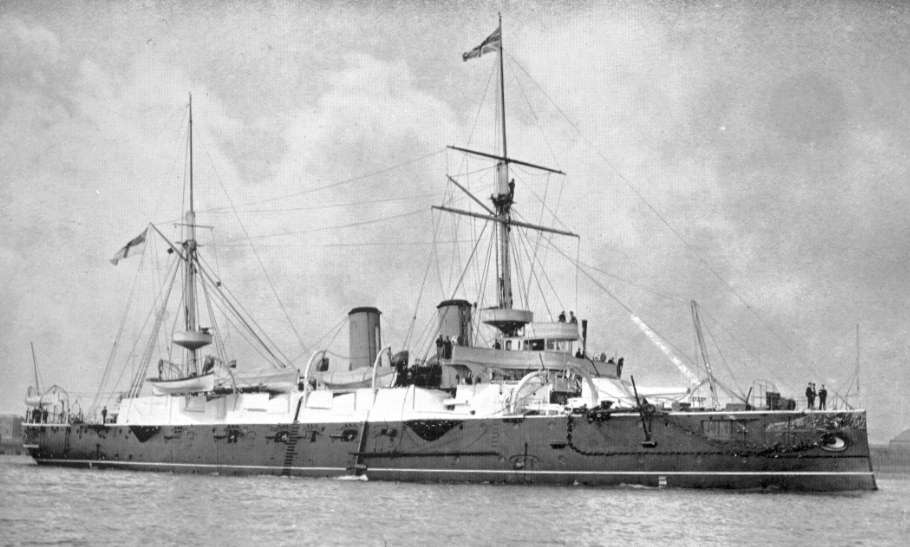
HMS Galatea

== See also ==
- Infanta Maria Teresa-class cruiser: a spanish class armored cruiser inspired design by Orlando class
