= Imperieuse-class cruiser =

1886 class of British armored cruisers

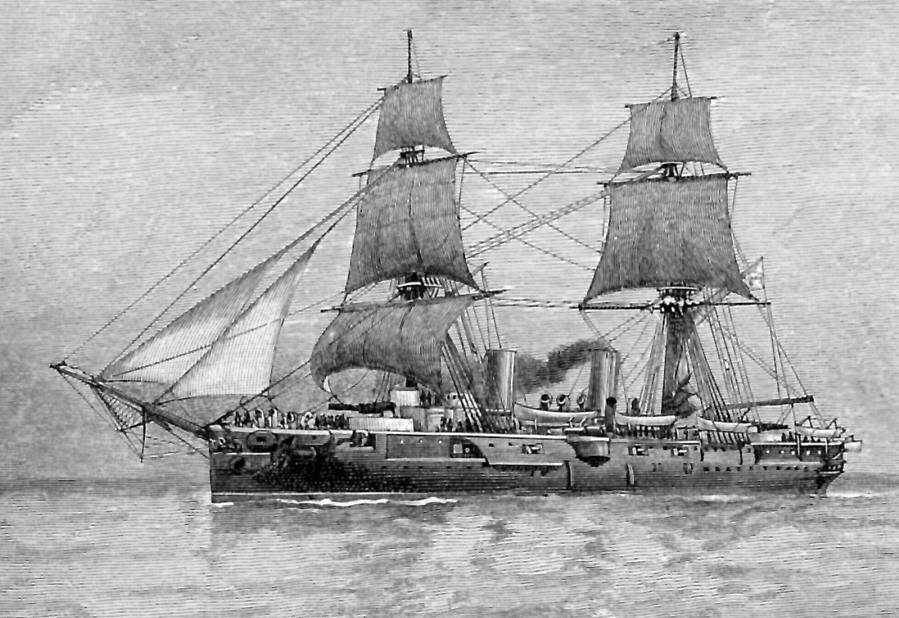
- HMS Warspite

Class overview
- Name: Imperieuse class
- Operators: Royal Navy
- Preceded by: Nelson class
- Succeeded by: Orlando class
- Built: 1881–1886
- In commission: 1886–1905
- Completed: 2
- Scrapped: 2

General characteristics
- Type: Armoured cruiser
- Displacement: 8,400 tons
- Length: 315 ft (96 m)
- Beam: 62 ft (19 m)
- Draught: 26 ft 9 in (8.15 m)
- Installed power: 8,000 indicated horsepower (6,000 kW)
- Propulsion: Coal-fired steam, twelve boilers.; Two shafts with three-cylinder inverted compound reciprocating engines.
- Speed: 16 knots (30 km/h)
- Range: 6,500 nautical miles (12,000 km) at 10 kn (19 km/h)
- Complement: 555
- Armament: 4 × BL 9.2-inch (234 mm) Mk III guns; 6 × 6-inch (152 mm) guns; 6 × 18-inch (450mm) torpedo tubes
- Armour: Compound armour; Waterline belt: 10 in (250 mm); Bulkheads: 9 in (230 mm); Barbettes: 8 in (200 mm); Decks: 2–4 in (51–102 mm); Gun shields: 2 in (51 mm); Conning tower: 9 in (230 mm)

The Imperieuse-class cruiser was a class of two armoured cruisers launched between 1883 and 1884 for the Royal Navy.

== Description ==
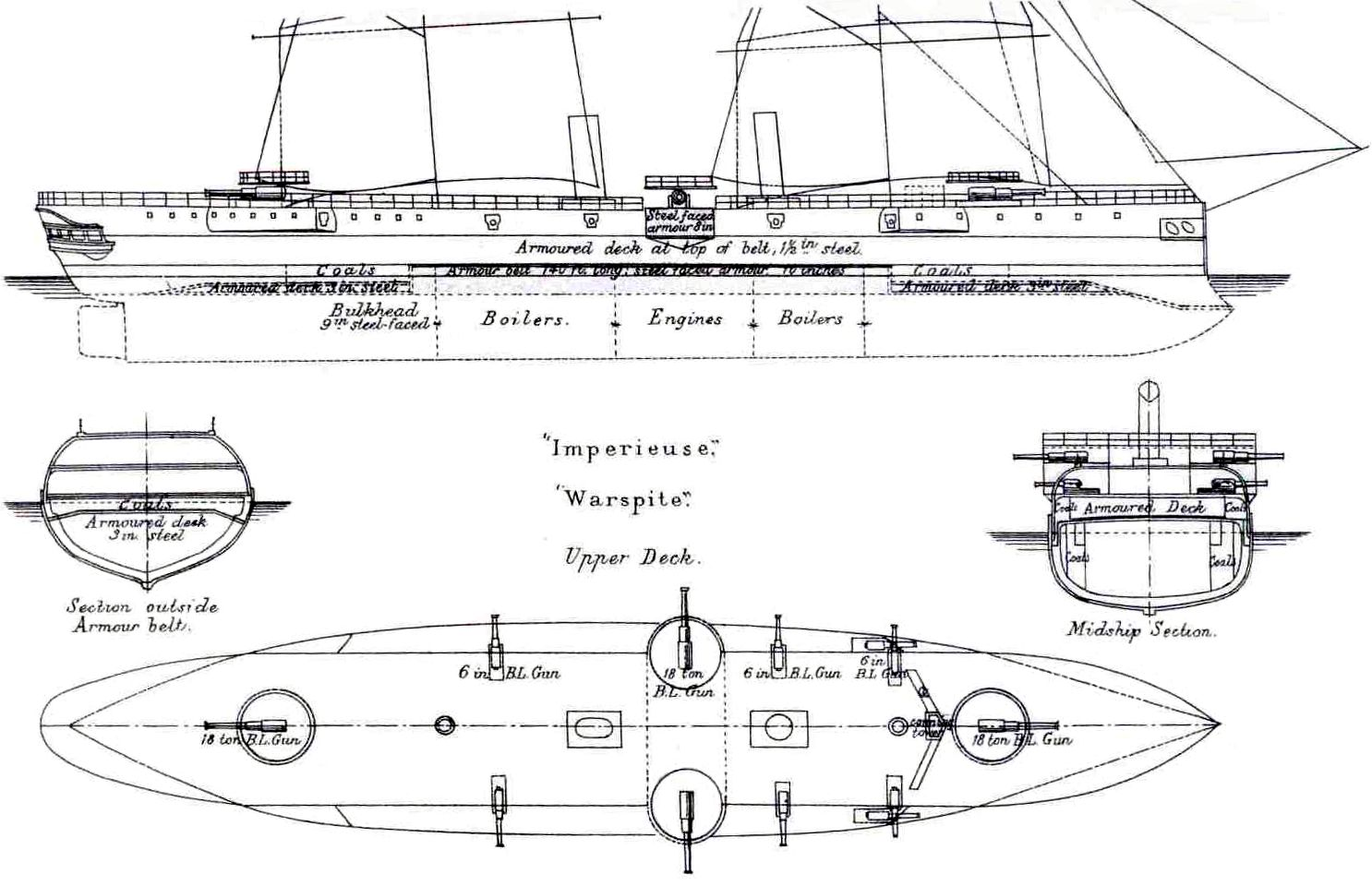
Starboard elevation and deck plan, from Brassey's naval annual 1888-9

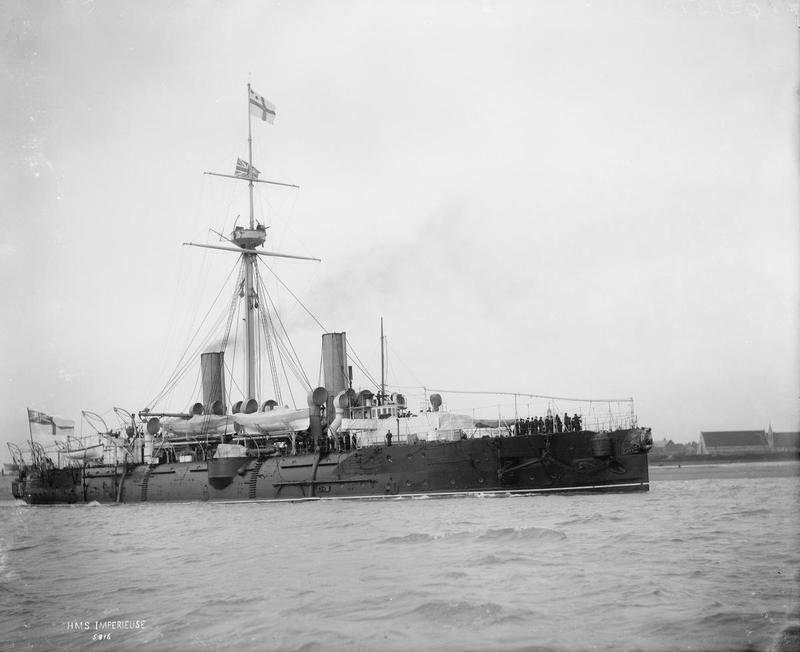
HMS Imperieuse in 1896 showing the later single central pole mast

In an 1886 magazine article, Sir Edward Reed complained that these ships did not deserve to be called "armoured", as they were not armoured at bow or stern, only along the middle 140 feet (43 m) of each side. This armour belt was additionally only 8 feet (2.4 m) wide, and as designed would have extended 3 feet 3 inches (0.99 m) above the waterline. As completed, the two ships were overweight, with the result that the belt was completely submerged, leaving them armoured in name only.

The layout of the main armament was unusual for the time, having one gun each forward and aft, and another gun mounted on either beam – in a lozenge arrangement similar to that employed by the French. The original secondary battery comprised ten 6-inch (152mm) guns, but the overweight condition of these ships forced the elimination of four of these weapons.

Intended for prolonged deployments on distant foreign stations, the ships were sheathed with wood and copper to prevent marine growth on the hull, and were originally fitted with a brig sailing rig to economize on coal. After trials showed them to be sluggish under sail, the masts and yards were removed and replaced by a single pole mast between the funnels. This reduction in rig and the weight saved thereby allowed the reinstallation of two 6-inch guns, for a total of eight.

== Ships ==
- Imperieuse – launched in 1883, converted to a depot ship in 1905 and renamed Sapphire II, later reverted to Imperieuse in 1909, and sold in 1913.
- Warspite – launched in 1884, scrapped 1906. One of Warspite's 9.2-inch breech-blocks is/was held at the Royal Military College of Science (RMCS) at Shrivenham.

== Building programme ==
The following table gives the build details and purchase cost of the members of the Imperieuse class. Standard British practice at that time was for these costs to exclude armament and stores. In the table:

- Machinery meant "propelling machinery".
- Hull included "hydraulic machinery, gun mountings, etc."

Ship	Builder	Maker of Engines	Date of			Cost according to				
Ship	Builder	Maker of Engines	Laid Down	Launch	Completion	(BNA 1895)			(BNA 1903)	Parkes
Ship	Builder	Maker of Engines	Laid Down	Launch	Completion	Hull	Machinery	Total excluding armament	(BNA 1903)	Parkes
Imperieuse	Portsmouth Dockyard	Maudslay	10 Aug 1881	18 Dec 1883	Sep 1886	£417,437	£113,377	£530,814	Details of cost incomplete	£543,758
Warspite	Chatham Dockyard	Penn	25 Oct 1881	29 Jan 1884	Jun 1888	£415,546	£113,786	£529,332	£653,072	£538,797
