= HMS Hearty (1885) =

British survey and guard vessel

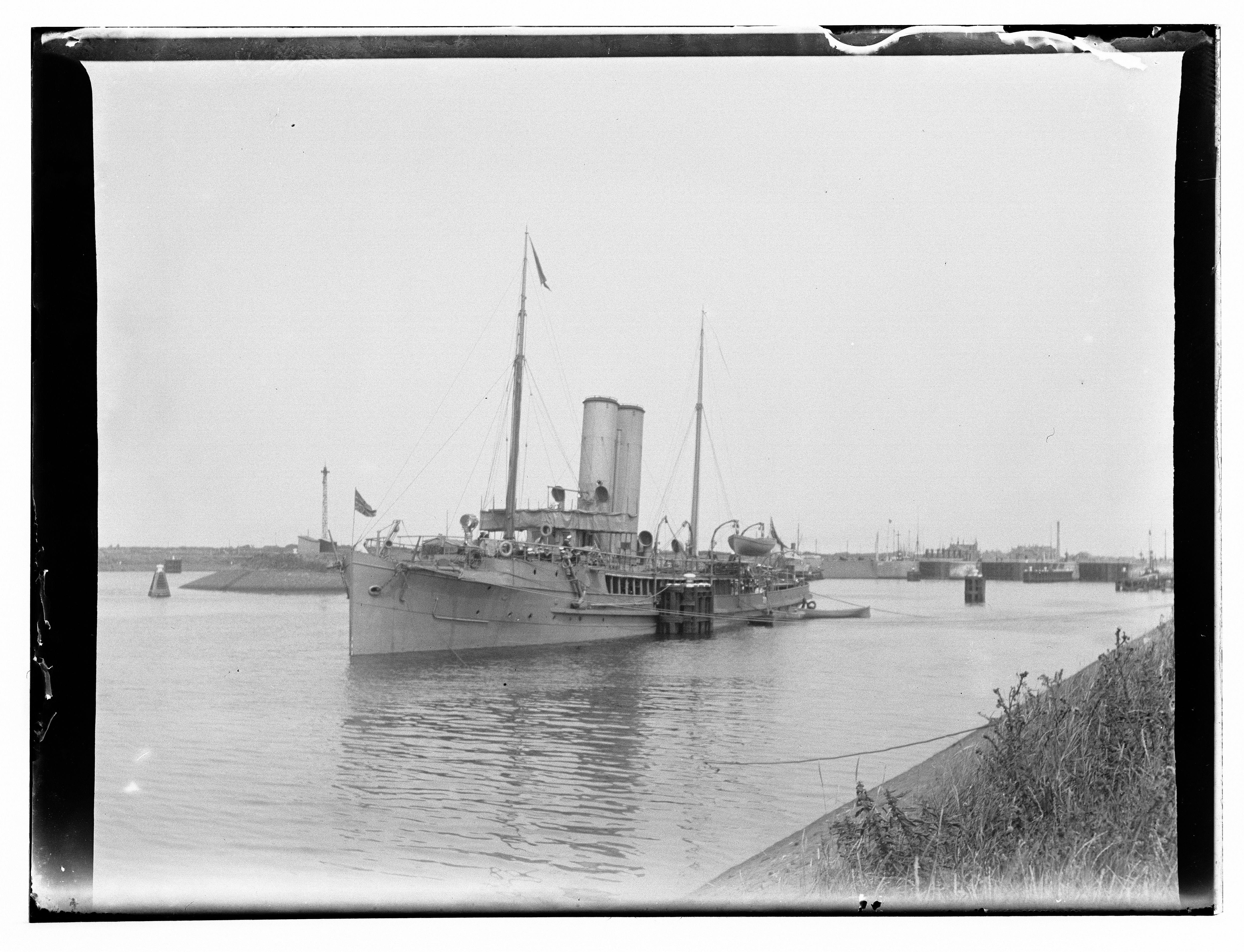
- Hearty in Ijmuiden harbour, 1903

History

United Kingdom
- Name: HMS Hearty
- Builder: W B Thomson, Dundee
- Launched: 18 April 1885
- Acquired: Purchased 1885
- Fate: Sold 6 November 1920 as salvage vessel

General characteristics
- Tonnage: 719 GRT
- Displacement: 1,300 long tons (1,300 t)
- Length: 212 ft 0 in (64.62 m)
- Beam: 30 ft 0 in (9.14 m)
- Draught: 13 ft 5 in (4.09 m)
- Installed power: 2,400 ihp (1,800 kW)
- Propulsion: 2 ×2-cylinder Compound steam engine; 2 screws
- Speed: 14 kn (16 mph; 26 km/h)
- Armament: 2 × 4 in (102 mm) BL; 2 × 12 pdr BL

HMS Hearty was a fishery protection vessel and survey ship of the British Royal Navy. Built by the Scottish shipbuilder W. B. Thompson as the tug Indra, the ship was launched in 1885 and purchased by the Royal Navy. Hearty was sold in 1920 for use as a salvage vessel. She was renamed Dalhousie in 1921, and was sold for scrap in 1930, being scrapped in 1935.

== Description ==
In 1885, the Royal Navy purchased the tug Indra, which was under construction by the shipbuilder W. B. Thomson at their Dundee shipyard for service at Calcutta in India. The tug was launched on 18 April 1885 as Yard number 65.

The ship was 212 ft 0 in (64.62 m) long overall, with a beam of 30 feet 0 inches (9.14 m) and a draught of 13 ft 5 in (4.09 m). Displacement was 1,300 long tons (1,321 t), with a tonnage of 719 GRT and 156 NRT. The ship was powered by two 2-cylinder Compound steam engines, rated at 2,400 indicated horsepower (1,800 kW), driving two propeller shafts. This gave a speed of 14 kn (16 mph; 26 km/h). Armament was two 4 inch (102 mm) BL and two 12 pdr (76 mm) BL guns. (Note: Dittmar and Colledge and Colledge and Warlow give an armament of four 3-pounder (47 mm) guns.)

== Service ==
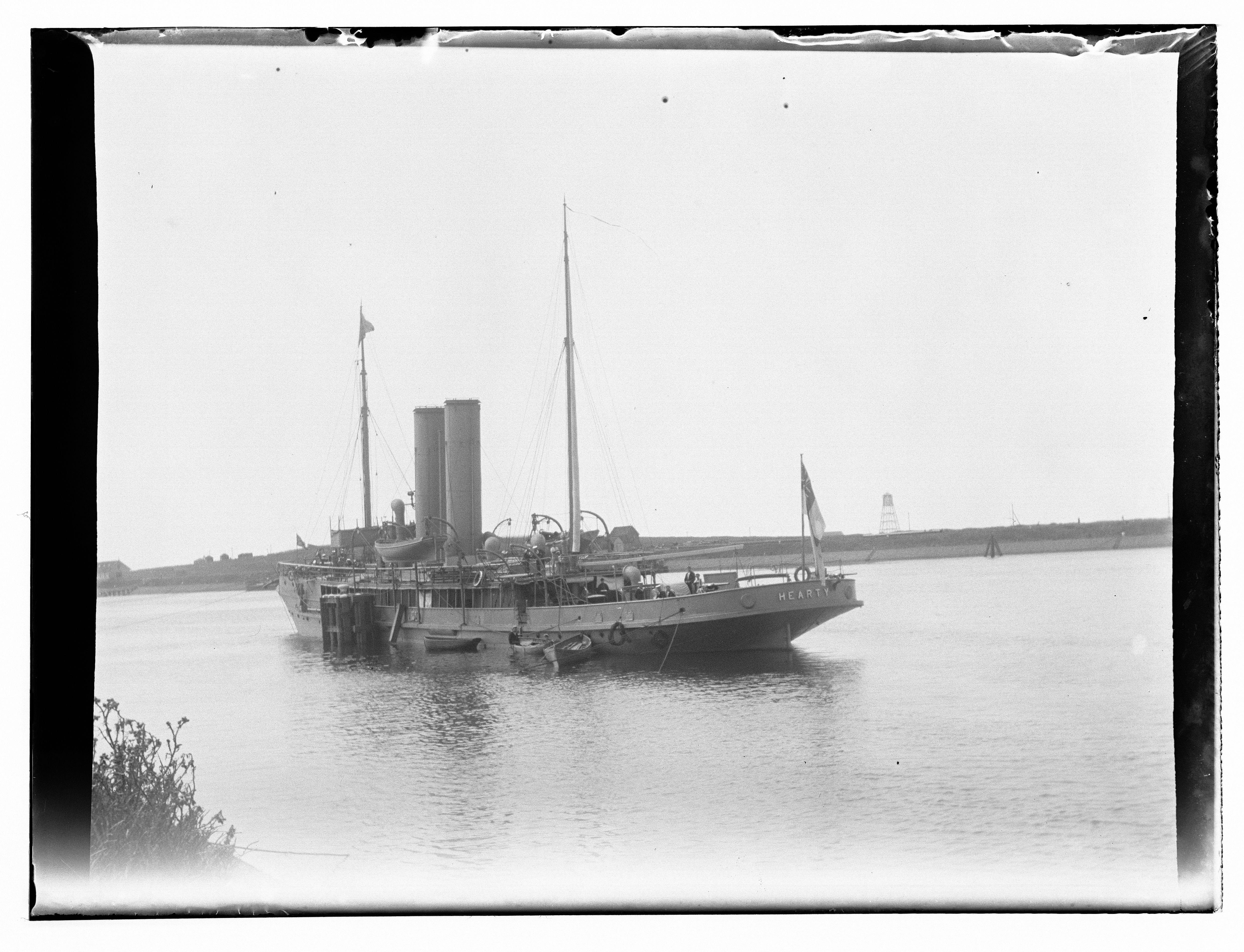

The ship underwent builders sea trials from June 1886, with acceptance trials completed in August that year, and sailing from Dundee to Chatham Dockyard on 5 September 1885. The ship was renamed to HMS Hearty on 7 December 1885. She was commissioned in September 1886, serving as a Special Service Vessel, employed on Fishery Protection duties in the North Sea and as a tug, and later was employed for harbour service at Chatham and Sheerness.

On 11 November 1907, Hearty was carrying a cargo of lifejackets between Chatham and Sheerness when she encountered heavy fog, which caused the journey to be aborted. When the fog lifted later in the day, she attempted the journey again, only to collide with and sink a barge and then run aground. In September 1908 she was employed, together with the battleship Victorious and the repair ship Cyclops, in towing targets for the Nore division of the Home Fleet for battle practice in Moray Firth. She was recommissioned as a survey ship in 1910, and was based at Dover for a series of deep tidal surveys of the English Channel, before being assigned to survey duties in the North Sea. In 1912, she was assisted by the surveying trawler Esther in her North Sea surveying duties. She continued on survey duties based at the Nore during the First World War.

== Salvage vessel ==
In April 1920, she was listed for sale, and she was sold to M.S. Hilton for use as a salvage vessel on 6 November 1920. She was renamed Dalhousie in 1921, and on 12 May 1922 was transferred to the Ocean Salvage Co Ltd of London, being employed in the Baltic. She was registered to the Ocean Salvage & Towage Co Ltd of London on 15 November 1922. In 1930, she was sold to the Swedish shipbreaker Karlshamns Skepsvarv, and she was scrapped in 1935.
