= List of cruiser classes of the Royal Navy =

This is a list of cruisers of the Royal Navy of the United Kingdom from 1877 (when the category was created by amalgamating the two previous categories of frigate and corvette) until the last cruiser was decommissioned more than a century later. There are no longer any cruisers in the Royal Navy.

== First class cruisers ==
Armoured cruisers were protected by a belt of side armour and an armoured deck. In the Royal Navy this classification was not actually used, the term first class cruiser being used instead for both armoured cruisers and large protected cruisers. Thus, the first class cruisers built between the Orlando class (1886) and the Cressy class (1897) were, strictly speaking, protected cruisers as they lacked an armoured belt. The first class cruiser was succeeded by the battlecruiser in the Royal Navy.

- Shannon first class armoured cruiser, (1875) 5,670 tons, 2×10in, 7×9inch
  - Shannon (1875) – Sold 1899
- Nelson class first class armoured cruiser, 7,473 tons, 4×10-inch, 6×9-inch
  - Nelson (1876) – Sold 1910
  - Northampton (1876) – Sold 1905
- Imperieuse class first class armoured cruiser, 8,500 tons, 4×9.2inch, 10×6inch
  - Imperieuse (1883) – Sold 1913
  - Warspite (1884) – Sold 1905
- Orlando class first class armoured cruiser, 5,600 tons, 2×9.2-inch, 10×6-inch
  - Orlando (1886) – Sold 1905
  - Australia (1886) – Sold 1905
  - Undaunted (1886) – Sold 1907
  - Narcissus (1886) – Sold 1906
  - Galatea (1887) – Sold 1905
  - Immortalite (1887) – Sold 1907
  - Aurora (1887) – Sold 1907
- Blake class first class protected cruiser, 9,150 tons, 2 × 9.2-inch, 10 × 6-inch
  - Blake (1889) – Sold 1922
  - Blenheim (1890) – Sold 1926
- Edgar class first class protected cruiser, 7,700 tons, 2× 9.2-inch, 10×6-inch
  - Edgar (1890) – Sold 1921
  - Hawke (1891) – Torpedoed 1914
  - Endymion (1891) – Sold 1920
  - Royal Arthur (1891) – Sold 1921
  - Gibraltar (1892) – Sold 1923
  - Grafton (1892) – Sold 1920
  - St George (1892) – Sold 1920
  - Theseus (1892) – Sold 1921
  - Crescent (1892) – Sold 1921
- Powerful class first class protected cruiser, 14,200 tons, 2×9.2-inch, 12× 6-inch
  - Powerful (1895) – Sold 1929
  - Terrible (1895) – Sold 1932
- Diadem class first class protected cruiser, 11,000 tons, 16× 6-inch
  - Diadem (1896) – Sold 1921
  - Niobe (1897) – To Canada as HMCS Niobe, BU 1922
  - Europa (1897) – Sold 1920
  - Andromeda (1897) – Sold 1956
  - Amphitrite (1898) – Sold 1920
  - Argonaut (1898) – Sold 1920
  - Ariadne (1898) – Torpedoed 1917
  - Spartiate (1898) – Sold 1932
- Cressy class first class armoured cruiser, 12,000 tons, 2×9.2-inch, 12×6-in
  - Cressy (1899) – Torpedoed 1914
  - Sutlej (1899) – Sold 1924
  - Aboukir (1900) – Torpedoed 1914
  - Hogue (1900) – Torpedoed 1914
  - Bacchante (1901) – Sold 1920
  - Euryalus (1901) – Sold 1920
- Drake class first class armoured cruiser, 14,150 tons, 2× 9.2-inch, 16×-6-inch
  - Drake (1901) – Torpedoed 1917
  - Good Hope (ex-Africa) (1901) – Sunk during the Battle of Coronel, 1914
  - King Alfred (1901) – Sold 1920
  - Leviathan (1901) – Sold 1920
- Monmouth class first class armoured cruiser, 9,800 tons, 14× 6-inch
  - Monmouth (1901) – Sunk during the Battle of Coronel, 1914
  - Bedford (1901) – Wrecked on 21 August 1910 off Quelport Island in the China Sea
  - Essex (1901) – Sold 1921
  - Kent (1901) – Sold 1920
  - Berwick (1902) – Sold 1920
  - Cornwall (1902) – Sold 1920
  - Cumberland (1902) – Sold 1921
  - Donegal (1902) – Sold 1920
  - Lancaster (1902) – Sold 1920
  - Suffolk (1903) – Sold 1920
- Devonshire class first class armoured cruiser, 10,850 tons, 4× 7.5-inch, 6× 6-inch
  - Devonshire (1904) – Sold 1921
  - Hampshire (1903) – Mined 1916
  - Carnarvon (1903) – Sold 1921
  - Antrim (1903) – Sold 1922
  - Roxburgh (1904) – Sold 1921
  - Argyll (1904) – Wrecked 1915
- Duke of Edinburgh group first class armoured cruiser
  - Duke of Edinburgh class 13,550 tons, 6× 9.2-inch, 10× 6-inch
    - Duke of Edinburgh (1904) – Sold 1920
    - Black Prince (1904) – Sunk at the Battle of Jutland, 1916
  - Warrior class 13,550 tons, 6x 9.2-in, 4x 7.5-in
    - Warrior (1905) – Sunk at the Battle of Jutland, 1916
    - Cochrane (1905) – Wrecked 1918
    - Achilles (1905) – Sold 1921
    - Natal (1905) – Explosion 1915
- Minotaur class first class armoured cruiser, 14,600 tons, 4× 9.2-inch, 10× 7.5-inch
  - Minotaur (1906) – Sold 1920
  - Shannon (1906) – Sold 1922
  - Defence (1907) – Sunk at the Battle of Jutland, 1916

== Protected cruisers ==
Protected cruisers were so-called because their vital machinery spaces were protected by an armoured deck and the arrangement of coal bunkers. The ships below are all protected cruisers, but were rated as second and third class cruisers by the Royal Navy. The third class cruiser was not expected to operate with the fleet, was substantially smaller than the second class and lacked the watertight double-bottom of the latter. With the advent of turbine machinery, oil firing and better armour plate the protected cruiser became obsolete and was succeeded by the light cruiser.

- Iris class second class cruiser, 3,730 tons, 10 × 64-pdr
  - Iris (1877) – Sold 1905
  - Mercury (1878) – Hulked 1914, sold 1919
- Comus class third class cruiser, 2,380 tons (Constance 2,590 tons), 2 × 7 in + 12 × 64-pdr (except Comus 4 × 6 in + 8 × 64-pdr; Canada & Cordelia 10 × 6 in)
  - Comus (1878) – Sold 1904
  - Curacoa (1878) – Sold 1904
  - Champion (1878) – Sold 1919
  - Cleopatra (1878) – Sold 1931
  - Carysfort (1878) – Sold 1899
  - Conquest (1878) – Sold 1899
  - Constance (1880) – Sold 1899
  - Canada (1881) – Sold 1897
  - Cordelia (1881) – Sold 1904
- Leander class second class cruiser, 4,300 tons, 10 × 6 in
  - Leander (1882) – Sold 1920
  - Arethusa (1882) – Sold 1905
  - Phaeton (1883) – Sold 1947
  - Amphion (1883) – Sold 1906
- Calypso class third class cruiser, 2,770 tons, 4 × 6 in + 12 × 5 in
  - Calypso (1883) – Sold 1922
  - Calliope (1884) – Sold 1951 (drill ship from 1907)
- Surprise class third class cruiser, 1,700 tons, 4 × 5 in
  - Surprise (1885) – Sold 1919
  - Alacrity (1885) – Sold 1913
- Mersey class second class cruiser, 4,050 tons, 2 × 8 in, 10 × 6 in
  - Mersey (1885) – Sold 1905
  - Severn (1885) – Sold 1905
  - Thames (1885) – Renamed General Botha, scuttled 1947
  - Forth (1886) – Sold 1921
- Scout class third class torpedo cruiser, 1,580 tons, 4 × 5 in
  - Scout (1885) – Sold 1904
  - Fearless (1886) – Sold 1905
- Archer class third class torpedo cruiser, 1,770 tons, 6 × 6 in
  - Archer (1885) – Sold 1905
  - Mohawk (1886) – Sold 1905
  - Brisk (1886) – Sold 1906
  - Porpoise (1886) – Sold 1905
  - Cossack (1886) – Sold 1905
  - Tartar (1886) – Sold 1906
  - Serpent (1887) – Wrecked 1890
  - Racoon (1887) – Sold 1905
- Marathon class second class cruiser, 2,850 tons, 6 × 6 in
  - Magicienne (1888) – Sold 1905
  - Medea (1888) – Sold 1914
  - Medusa (1888) – Sold 1920
  - Marathon (1888) – Sold 1905
  - Melpomene (1888) – Sold 1905
- Barracouta class third class cruiser, 1,580 tons, 6 × 4.7 in
  - Barracouta (1889) – Sold 1905
  - Barrosa (1889) – Sold 1905
  - Blanche (1889) – Sold 1905
  - Blonde (1889) – Sold 1905
- Barham class third class cruiser, 1,830 tons, 6 × 4.7 in
  - Barham (1889) – Sold 1914
  - Bellona (1890) – Sold 1906
- Pearl class third class cruiser, 2,575 tons, 8 × 4.7 in
  - Pandora (1889) – Sold 1906
  - Psyche (1889) – Sold 1906
  - Phoenix (1889) – Sold 1906
  - Pelorus (1889) – Sold 1906
  - Persian (1890) – Sold 1920
  - Pallas (1890) – Sold 1906
  - Phoebe (1890) – Sold 1906
  - Pearl (1890) – Sold 1906
  - Philomel (1890) – Sold 1947, scuttled 1949
- Apollo class second class cruiser, 3,400 tons, 2 × 6 in, 6 × 4.7 in
  - Latona (1890) – Sold 1920
  - Melampus (1890) – Sold 1910
  - Andromache (1890) – Sold 1920
  - Sirius (1890) – Scuttled 1918
  - Terpsichore (1890) – Sold 1914
  - Naiad (1890) – Sold 1922
  - Pique (1890) – Sold 1911
  - Thetis (1890) – Scuttled 1918
  - Sybille (1890) – Wrecked 1901
  - Apollo (1891) – Sold 1920
  - Tribune (1891) – Sold 1911
  - Spartan (1891) – Renamed Defiance 1921, sold 1931
  - Indefatigable (1891) – Sold 1913
  - Rainbow (1891) – To Canada as HMCS Rainbow 1910; sold 1920
  - Sappho (1891) – Sold 1921
  - Intrepid (1891) – Scuttled 1918
  - Brilliant (1891) – Scuttled 1918
  - Retribution (1891) – Sold 1911
  - Scylla (1891) – Sold 1914
  - Aeolus (1891) – Sold 1914
  - Iphigenia (1891) – Scuttled 1918
- Astraea class second class cruiser, 4,360 tons, 2 × 6 in, 8 × 4.7 in
  - Bonaventure (1892) – Sold 1920
  - Cambrian (1893) – Sold 1923
  - Astraea (1893) – Sold 1920
  - Charybdis (1893) – Sold 1922
  - Fox (1893) – Sold 1920
  - Hermione (1893) – Renamed Warspite, sold 1940
  - Flora (1893) – Renamed Indus II, sold 1922
  - Forte (1893) – Sold 1914
- Eclipse class second class cruiser, 5,600 tons, 5 × 6 in, 6 × 4.7 in
  - Eclipse (1894) – Sold 1921
  - Talbot (1895) – Sold 1921
  - Venus (1895) – Sold 1921
  - Minerva (1895) – Sold 1920
  - Juno (1895) – Sold 1920
  - Diana (1895) – Sold 1920
  - Doris (1896) – Sold 1919
  - Dido (1896) – Sold 1926
  - Isis (1896) – Sold 1920
- Arrogant class second class cruiser, 5,750 tons, 4 × 6 in, 6 × 4.7 in
  - Arrogant (1896) – Sold 1923
  - Furious (1896) – Renamed Forte 1915, sold 1923
  - Gladiator (1896) – Collision 1908, refloated, sold 1909
  - Vindictive (1897) – Scuttled 1918
- Pelorus class third class cruiser, 2,135 tons, 8 × 4 in
  - Proserpine (1896) – Sold 1919
  - Pelorus (1896) – Sold 1920
  - Pactolus (1896) – Sold 1921
  - Pegasus (1897) – Sunk 1914
  - Perseus (1897) – Sold 1914
  - Pomone (1897) – Sold 1922
  - Pyramus (1897) – Sold 1920
  - Psyche (1898) – To Australia 1915; sold 1922; sank 1940
  - Prometheus (1898) – Sold 1914
  - Pioneer (1899) – To Australia 1912, scuttled 1931
  - Pandora (1900) – Sold 1913
- Highflyer class second class cruiser, 5,650 tons, 11 × 6 in
  - Hermes (1898) – Torpedoed 1914
  - Highflyer (1898) – Sold 1921
  - Hyacinth (1898) – Sold 1923
- Challenger class second class cruiser, 5,880 tons, 11 × 6 in
  - Challenger (1902) – Sold 1920
  - Encounter (1902) – To Australia 1912 as HMAS Encounter, renamed Penguin 1923, scuttled 1932
- Topaze class third class cruiser, 3,000 tons, 12 × 4 in
  - Topaze (1903) – Sold 1921
  - Amethyst (1903) – Sold 1920
  - Diamond (1904) – Sold 1921
  - Sapphire (1904) – Sold 1921

== Scout cruisers ==
The scout cruiser was a smaller, faster, more lightly armed and armoured cruiser than the protected cruiser, intended for fleet scouting duties and acting as a flotilla leader. Essentially there were two distinct groups – the eight vessels all ordered under the 1903 Programme, and the seven later vessels ordered under the 1907-1910 Programmes. The advent of better machinery and larger, faster destroyers and light cruisers effectively made them obsolete.

- Sentinel class 2,880 tons, 10 × 12-pdr
  - Sentinel (1904) – Sold 1923
  - Skirmisher (1905) – Sold 1920
- Adventure class 2,640 tons, 10 × 12-pdr
  - Adventure (1904) – Sold 1920
  - Attentive (1904) – Sold 1920
- Forward class 2,860 tons, 10 × 12-pdr
  - Forward (1904) – Sold 1921
  - Foresight (1904) – Sold 1920
- Pathfinder class 2,900 tons, 10 × 12-pdr
  - Pathfinder (1904) – Torpedoed 1914
  - Patrol (1904) – Sold 1920
- Boadicea class 3,300 tons, 6 × 4in
  - Boadicea (1908) – Sold 1926
  - Bellona (1909) – Sold 1921
- Blonde class 3,350 tons, 10 × 4in
  - Blonde (1910) – Sold 1920
  - Blanche (1909) – Sold 1921
- Active class 3,440 tons, 10 × 4in
  - Active (1911) – Sold 1920
  - Amphion (1911) – Sunk 1914
  - Fearless (1912) – Sold 1921

== Light cruisers ==
The light armoured cruiser – light cruiser – succeeded the protected cruiser; improvements in machinery and armour rendering the latter obsolete. The Town class of 1910 were rated as second-class protected cruisers, but were effectively light armoured cruisers with mixed coal and oil firing. The Arethusa class of 1913 were the first oil-only fired class. This meant that the arrangement of coal bunkers in the hull could no longer be relied upon as protection and the adoption of destroyer-type machinery resulted in a higher speed. This makes the Arethusas the first "true example" of the warship that came to be recognised as the light cruiser. In the London Naval Treaty of 1930, light cruisers were officially defined as cruisers having guns of 6.1 inches (155 mm) calibre or less, with a displacement not exceeding 10,000 tons.

- Town class
  - Bristol group 4,800 tons, two 6-in & ten 4-in guns
    - Bristol (1910) – sold 1921
    - Glasgow (1910) – sold 1927
    - Gloucester (1910) – sold 1921
    - Liverpool (1910) – sold 1921
    - Newcastle (1910) – sold 1921
  - Weymouth group 5,250 tons, eight 6-in guns
    - Weymouth (1911) – sold 1928
    - Dartmouth (1911) – sold 1930
    - Falmouth (1911) – sunk 1916
    - Yarmouth (1912) – sold 1929
  - Chatham group 5,400 tons, eight 6-in guns
    - Chatham (1912) – sold 1926
    - Dublin (1913) – sold 1926
    - Southampton (1912) – sold 1926
    - HMAS Brisbane (1916) – sold 1936
    - HMAS Melbourne (1913) – sold 1929
    - HMAS Sydney (1913) – scrapped 1929
  - Birmingham group 5,440 tons, nine 6-in guns
    - Birmingham (1914) – sold 1931
    - Lowestoft (1914) – sold 1931
    - Nottingham (1914) – sunk 1916
    - HMAS Adelaide (1922) – sold 1949
  - Birkenhead group 5,185 tons, ten 5.5-in guns
    - Birkenhead (1915) – sold 1921
    - Chester (1916) – sold 1921
- Arethusa class, 3,750 tons, two 6-in & six 4-in guns
  - Arethusa (1914) – wrecked 1916
  - Aurora (1914) – to Canada 1920; sold 1927
  - Galatea (1914) – sold 1921
  - Inconstant (1915) – sold 1922
  - Penelope (1914) – sold 1924
  - Phaeton (1915) – sold 1923
  - Royalist (1915) – sold 1922
  - Undaunted (1914) – sold 1923
- C class
  - Caroline group 4,219 tons, two 6-in & eight 4-in guns
    - Caroline (1914) – museum ship 2016
    - Carysfort (1914) – sold 1931
    - Cleopatra (1915) – sold 1931
    - Comus (1914) – sold 1934
    - Conquest (1915) – sold 1930
    - Cordelia (1914) – sold 1923
  - Calliope group 4,228 tons, two 6-in & eight 4-in guns
    - Calliope (1914) – sold 1931
    - Champion (1915) – sold 1934
  - Cambrian group 4,320 tons, two 6-in & eight 4-in guns
    - Cambrian (1916) – sold 1934
    - Canterbury (1915) – sold 1934
    - Castor (1915) – sold 1936
    - Constance (1915) – sold 1936
  - Centaur group 4,165 tons, five 6-in guns
    - Centaur (1916) – sold 1934
    - Concord (1916) – sold 1935
  - Caledon group 4,180 tons, five 6-in guns
    - Caledon (1916) – sold 1948
    - Calypso (1917) – torpedoed 1940
    - Cassandra (1916) – struck a mine 1918
    - Caradoc (1916) – sold 1946
  - Ceres group 4,190 tons, five 6-in guns
    - Cardiff (1917) – sold 1946
    - Ceres (1917) – scrapped 1946
    - Coventry (1917) – sunk 1942
    - Curacoa (1917) – sunk in collision 1942
    - Curlew (1917) – bombed 1940
  - Carlisle group 4,290 tons, five 6-in guns
    - Cairo (1918) – torpedoed 1942
    - Calcutta (1919) – bombed in 1941
    - Capetown (1919) – sold 1946
    - Carlisle (1918) – scrapped 1949
    - Colombo (1918) – sold 1948
- Danae class 4,850 tons, six 6-in guns
  - Danae (1918) – scrapped 1948
  - Dauntless (1918) – scrapped 1946
  - Dragon (1918) – scuttled 1944
  - Delhi (1919) – sold 1948
  - Dunedin (1919) – torpedoed 1941
  - Durban (1921) – scuttled 1944
  - Despatch (1922) – sold 1946
  - Diomede (1922) – sold 1946
- Emerald class 7,580 tons, seven 6-in guns
  - Emerald (1926) – sunk as target 1947; scrapped 1948
  - Enterprise (1926) – sold 1946
- Leander class
  - Leander group 7,200 tons, eight 6-in guns
    - HMNZS Achilles (1933) – to the Indian Navy 1948 as the INS Delhi; scrapped 1978
    - Ajax (1935) – scrapped 1949
    - HMNZS Leander (1933) – sold 1949
    - Neptune (1934) – struck a mine 1941
    - Orion (1934) – sold 1949
  - Amphion group 6,900 tons, eight 6-in guns
    - Amphion (1936) – to Royal Australian Navy 1939 as HMAS Perth – torpedoed 1942
    - Apollo (1936) – to RAN 1938 as HMAS Hobart; sold 1962
    - Phaeton (1935) – to RAN 1935 as HMAS Sydney – sunk 1941
- Arethusa class 5,220 tons, six 6-in guns
  - Arethusa (1935) – scrapped 1950
  - Aurora (1937) – Sold to Republic of China Navy 1948; to People's Republic of China 1949; sunk 1949
  - Galatea (1935) – torpedoed 1941
  - Penelope (1936) – torpedoed 1944
- Town class
  - Southampton group 9,100 tons, 12 6-in guns
    - Southampton (1937) – sunk 1941
    - Birmingham (1937) – scrapped 1960
    - Glasgow (1937) – sold 1958
    - Newcastle (1937) – sold 1959
    - Sheffield (1937) – scrapped 1967
  - Gloucester group 9,400 tons, 12 6-in guns
    - Gloucester (1939) – bombed 1941
    - Liverpool (1938) – sold 1958
    - Manchester (1938) – sunk 1942
  - Edinburgh group 10,565 tons, 12 6-in guns
    - Edinburgh (1939) – sunk 1942
    - Belfast (1939) – Currently a museum ship in London
- Dido class
  - Dido group 5,600 tons, ten 5.25-in guns
    - Bonaventure (1940) – torpedoed 1941
    - Dido (1940) – scrapped 1957
    - Hermione (1941) – torpedoed 1942
    - Naiad (1940) – torpedoed 1942
    - Phoebe (1940) – scrapped 1956
    - Euryalus (1941) – scrapped 1959
    - Sirius (1942) – scrapped 1956
    - Charybdis (1941) – torpedoed 1943
    - Cleopatra (1941) – scrapped 1958
    - Scylla (1942) – scrapped 1950
    - Argonaut (1942) – scrapped 1955
  - Bellona group 5,770 tons, eight 5.25-in guns
    - Bellona (1943) – to Royal New Zealand Navy 1946; scrapped 1959
    - Black Prince (1943) – to Royal New Zealand Navy 1946; scrapped 1962
    - Diadem (1943) – to Pakistani Navy 1956 as PNS Babur; scrapped 1985
    - Royalist (1943) – to Royal New Zealand Navy 1956; scrapped 1967
    - Spartan (1943) – bombed 1944
- Fiji class
  - Fiji group 8,525 tons, 12 6-in guns
    - Bermuda (1942) – scrapped 1965
    - Fiji (1940) – bombed 1941
    - Gambia (1942) – scrapped 1968
    - Jamaica (1942) – sold 1960
    - Kenya (1940) – scrapped 1955
    - Mauritius (1941) – scrapped 1962
    - Nigeria (1940) – to Indian Navy as INS Mysore 1957; scrapped 1986
    - Trinidad (1941) – bombed 1942
  - Ceylon group 8,875 tons, nine 6-in guns
    - Ceylon (1943) – to Peruvian Navy as BAP Coronel Bolognesi 1960; scrapped 1985
    - Newfoundland (1943) – to Peruvian Navy as BAP Capitán Quiñones 1959; scrapped 1979
    - Uganda (1943) – scrapped 1955 Royal Canadian Navy as HMCS Quebec 1944; scrapped 1961
- Minotaur class 8,800 tons, nine 6-in guns
  - Swiftsure (1944) – scrapped 1962
  - Minotaur (1945) – to Royal Canadian Navy 1945 as Ontario 1944; scrapped 1960
  - Superb (1945)– scrapped 1960
- Tiger class 11,700 tons, four 6-in & six 3-in guns. Laid down during World War II as Minotaur-class ships
  - Tiger (1959) – scrapped 1986
  - Lion (1960) – sold 1975
  - Blake (1961) – sold 1982

== Heavy cruisers ==
The heavy cruiser was defined in the London Naval Treaty of 1930 as a cruiser with a main gun calibre more than 6 inches but not exceeding 8 inches. The earlier Hawkins class were therefore retrospectively classified as such, although they had been initially built as "improved light cruisers". The County were built as light cruisers with most of them in service at the time of the Treaty of London, after which they were also redesignated as heavy cruisers. A further three Countys were cancelled. The York class was a reduced version of the County to build more ships within tonnage limits.

- Hawkins class (also known as Cavendish) or 9,860 tons, 7x 7.5-inch
  - Cavendish (1918) – completed as aircraft carrier Vindictive, converted to cruiser in 1925, to training ship 1937; scrapped 1946
  - Hawkins (1919) – scrapped 1947
  - Raleigh (1920) – wrecked 1922
  - Frobisher (1924) – scrapped 1949
  - Effingham (1925) – wrecked 1940
- County class, 8x 8-inch
  - Kent group 10,570 tons
    - Cumberland (1928) – scrapped 1959
    - Berwick (1928) – scrapped 1948
    - Cornwall (1928) – bombed 1942
    - Suffolk (1928) – scrapped 1948
    - Kent (1928) – scrapped 1948
    - Australia (1928) – Royal Australian Navy, scrapped 1955
    - Canberra (1928) – Royal Australian Navy, torpedoed 1942
  - London group 9,830 tons
    - London (1929) – scrapped 1950
    - Devonshire (1929) – scrapped 1954
    - Shropshire (1929) – to Royal Australian Navy 1943, scrapped 1955
    - Sussex (1929) – scrapped 1950
  - Norfolk group 10,300 tons
    - Norfolk (1930) – scrapped 1950
    - Dorsetshire (1930) – sunk by dive bombers in Far East 1942
- York class modified County design 8,250 tons, 6x 8-inch
  - York (1930) – damaged by explosive motor boats, salvage abandoned and wrecked 1941, scrapped 1952
  - Exeter (1931) – sunk 1942, Far East

== Large light cruisers ==
The "large light cruisers" were a pet project of Admiral Fisher to operate in shallow Baltic Sea waters and they are often classed as a form of battlecruiser.

- Courageous or Glorious class
  - Glorious group 19,320 tons, 4 × 15 in, 18 × 4 in
    - Glorious (77) (1916) – converted to aircraft carrier 1924–1930; sunk 1940
    - Courageous (50) (1916) – converted to aircraft carrier 1924–1928; sunk 1939
  - Furious 19,513 tons, 2 × 18 in, 11 × 5.5 in
    - Furious (47) (1917) – completed as aircraft carrier; sold 1948

== Minelaying cruisers ==
These "minelaying cruisers" were the only purpose-built oceangoing minelayers of the Royal Navy. The Abdiel class could reach 38 knots and in practice were used as fast transports to supply isolated garrisons, such as those at Malta and Tobruk.

- Adventure 6,740 tons, 4 × 4.7 in
  - Adventure (M23) (1926) – converted to repair ship 1944, scrapped 1947
- Abdiel class
  - 1938 group 2,650 tons, 6 × 4 in
    - Abdiel (M39) (1941) – sunk in Taranto Bay 1943
    - Latona (M76) (1941) – sunk off Libya 1941
    - Manxman (M70) (1941) – scrapped 1972
    - Welshman (M84) (1941) – sunk off Crete 1943
  - Wartime Emergency Programme group 2,650 tons, 4 × 4 in
    - Ariadne (M65) (1944) – scrapped 1965
    - Apollo (M01) (1944) – scrapped 1962

== Helicopter cruisers ==
Two ships of the Tiger-class were rebuilt to each operate four helicopters. Tiger (C20) and Blake (C99) served for part of the 1970s before they were withdrawn from service.

== Through-deck cruisers ==
Although at times called "through-deck cruisers", the Invincible class of the 1980s were small aircraft carriers.

== See also ==
- List of cruisers
