= Ernest Gaunt =

Royal Navy Admiral; Commander-in-Chief, Western Approaches (1865–1940)

Admiral Sir Ernest Gaunt KCB KBE CMG
- Born: Ernest Frederick Augustus Gaunt; 25 March 1865; Beechworth, Victoria
- Died: 20 April 1940; Westminster Hospital, London
- Military career
- Allegiance: United Kingdom
- Branch: Royal Navy
- Service years: 1878–1925
- Rank: Admiral
- Commands: 1st Battle Squadron; Commander-in-Chief, East Indies; Western Approaches
- Conflicts: Boxer Rebellion; World War I

Admiral Sir Ernest Frederick Augustus Gaunt, KCB, KBE, CMG (25 March 1865 – 20 April 1940) was an Australian-born Royal Navy officer who went on to be Commander-in-Chief, Western Approaches.

== Naval career ==
Gaunt was born in Beechworth, Victoria, Australia, the son of William Henry Gaunt and Elizabeth Mary Palmer. Gaunt joined the Royal Navy in 1878 at the age of 13.

In 1881, he was a midshipman in HMS Wolverine, by 1891 he was a lieutenant on Belleisle, and by 1896 he was 1st Lieutenant on the armoured cruiser HMS Narcissus. Promoted to Commander on 30 June 1898, Gaunt was, in 1898 and 1899, 1st Commissioner for Weihawei and Administrator for Liukungtao, China. In 1900, he was Commissioner and Superintending transport officer Weihawei, China, at the time of the Boxer Rebellion.

He was appointed a Companion of the Order of St Michael and St George (CMG) in the 1902 Coronation Honours list on 26 June 1902 for his services during the rebellion. In August 1901, he was appointed in command of the cruiser HMS Scout, which served with the Mediterranean Fleet and in June 1902 replaced HMS Harrier as special service vessel at Constantinople. The vessel visited Constanța, the main seaport of Romania, in October 1902, then travelled on the Danube to Galați.

He transferred to HMS Mohawk in February 1903, as she replaced Scout at Constantinople. In December 1903, he commanded a landing party from Mohawk at Durbo, on the coast of Italian Somaliland, where he was wounded. In 1905, as commander of HMS Cambrian, he took possession of the Ashmore Islands in the Indian Ocean on behalf of the United Kingdom.

In 1913, he became Commodore of the Royal Naval Barracks, Chatham, England, and in 1913 and 1914, he was aide-de-camp to King George V. In 1916, during World War I, he served as second-in-command of the 1st Battle Squadron at the Battle of Jutland as Rear Admiral; his flagship was Colossus. From 1917 to 1919 he was Commander-in-Chief, East Indies, and from 1921 to 1922 he was Commander-in-Chief, Western Approaches. In 1925 he retired, and was knighted. He died in Chelsea, London.

== Family ==
In 1899, he married Louise Geraldine Martyn of Gregans Castle, near Ballyvaughan in County Clare, Ireland.

His brother, Guy Gaunt, was also an Admiral of the Royal Navy, and later became a Conservative Member of Parliament. Their sister, Mary Gaunt, was a well-known author in Australia and wrote several travel books.

Military offices
| Preceded by Sir Rosslyn Wemyss | Commander-in-Chief, East Indies; 1917–1919 | Succeeded by Sir Hugh Tothill |
| Preceded by Sir Reginald Tupper | Commander-in-Chief, Western Approaches; 1921–1922 | Post disestablished |
