= HMS Serpent (1887) =

Cruiser of the Royal Navy

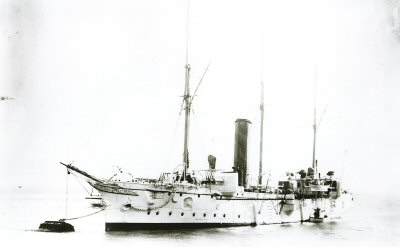

History

United Kingdom
- Name: HMS Serpent
- Builder: Devonport Dockyard
- Laid down: 9 November 1885
- Launched: 10 March 1887
- Completed: March 1888
- Fate: Wrecked 10 November 1890

General characteristics
- Class & type: Archer-class torpedo cruiser
- Displacement: 1,770 long tons (1,800 t) normal, 1,950 long tons (1,980 t) full load
- Length: 240 ft (73.15 m) oa
- Beam: 36 ft (10.97 m)
- Draught: 14 ft 6 in (4.42 m)
- Installed power: 4,500 ihp (3,400 kW)
- Propulsion: Twin 2-cylinder compound steam engines; Four boilers; Twin screws
- Speed: 17.5 kn (32.4 km/h)
- Range: 7,000 nmi (13,000 km)
- Complement: 176 men
- Armament: 6× 6-inch (5 ton) guns; 8 × 3-pounder QF guns; 2 × machine guns; 3 × 14-inch torpedo tubes
- Armour: 3/8 in (10 mm) deck; 1 inch (25 mm) gunshields; 3 in (76 mm) conning tower

HMS Serpent, was an Archer-class torpedo cruiser of the Royal Navy. Serpent was built at Devonport Dockyard, entering service in 1888. She was lost when she ran aground off Cape Vilan in northwest Spain with the loss of 173 people out of 176 in her crew.

== Construction ==
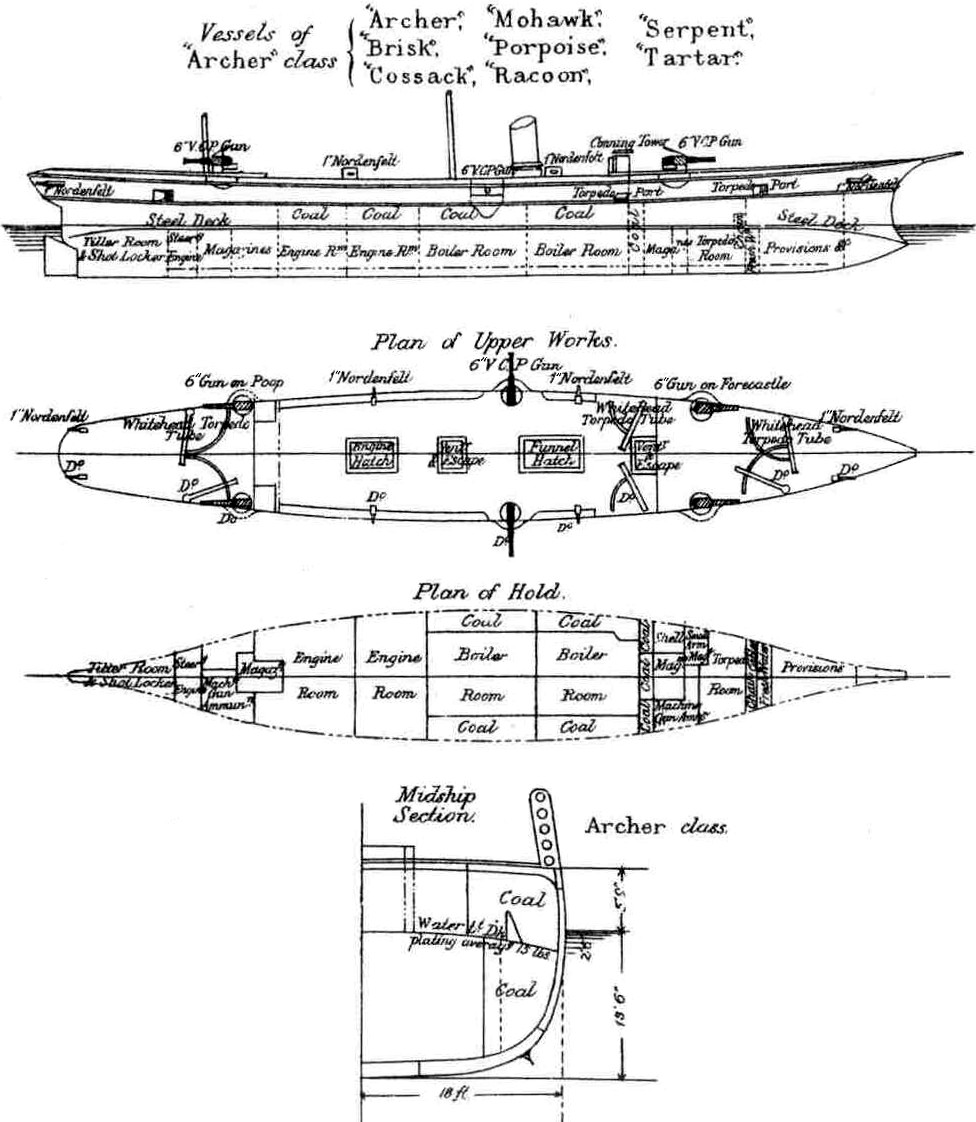
Plans of Archer-class torpedo cruiser

Serpent was laid down at Devonport Dockyard on 9 November 1885 as a member of the Archer-class of torpedo cruisers, was launched on 10 March 1887 and completed in March 1888.

Torpedo cruisers were small, relatively fast, ships intended to defend the fleet against attacks by hostile torpedo boats, while themselves being capable of attacking hostile fleets with torpedoes. The Archer class were enlarged derivatives of the earlier Scout-class, which carried a heavier armament.

Serpent was 240-foot (73.15 m) long overall and 225-foot (68.58 m) between perpendiculars, with a beam of 36-foot (10.97 m) and a draught of 14-foot-6-inch (4.42 m). Displacement was 1,770 long tons (1,800 t) normal and 1,950 long tons (1,980 t) full load. The ship's machinery, built by Harland & Wolff, consisted of two horizontal compound steam engines rated at 4,500 indicated horsepower (3,400 kW), which were fed by four boilers and drove two shafts for a speed of 17.5 knots (32.4 km/h; 20.1 mph). 475 tons of coal were carried, sufficient to give a range of 7,000 nautical miles (13,000 km; 8,100 mi), and three masts were fitted.

Armament consisted of six 6-inch (5 ton) guns, backed up by eight 3-pounder QF guns and two machine guns. Three 14-inch torpedo tubes completed the ship's armament. Armour consisted of a 3/8 inch (10 mm) deck, with 1 inch (25 mm) gunshields and 3 inches (76 mm) protecting the ship's conning tower. The ship had a complement of 176 officers and ratings.

== Service ==
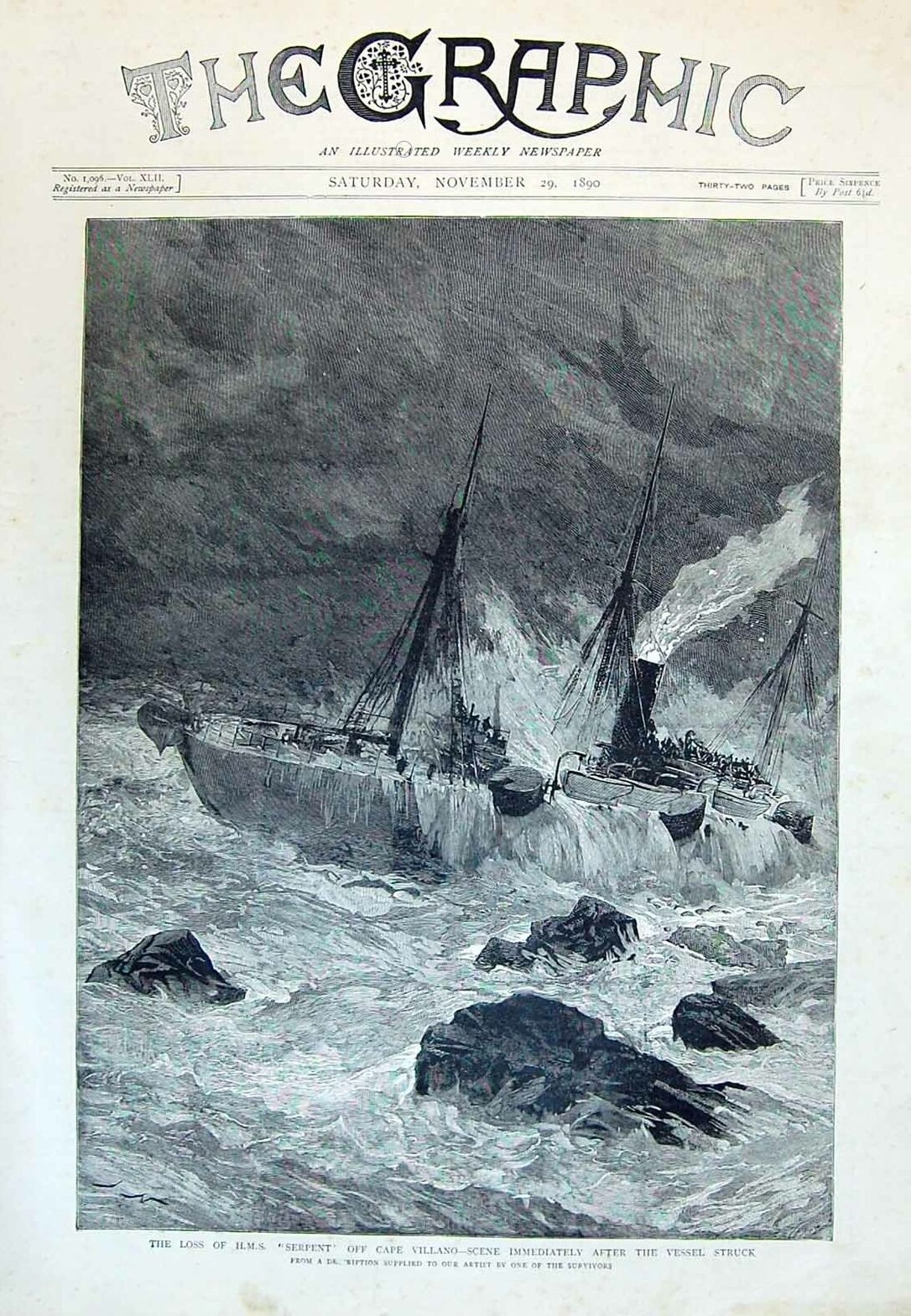
The loss of the Serpent off Cape Villano, the scene immediately after the vessel struck. The Graphic, 1890

Serpent took part in the 1888 Fleet manoeuvres, where her machinery proved unreliable, and in the 1889 manoeuvres. On 8 November 1890, Serpent left Devonport to relieve the sloop Acorn on the West African Station. On the night of 10 November, Serpent was caught in a heavy storm in the Bay of Biscay and attempted to reach shelter, but ran aground on Cape Vilan near the village of Camariñas in Galicia, northwest Spain. All but three of her crew were killed. The resulting court martial investigating the cause of the loss of Serpent concluded that the ship had been lost as a result of a navigation error.

The dead are buried where they were washed ashore at the English cemetery, Costa da Morte, Galicia. 43.122°N 9.192°W

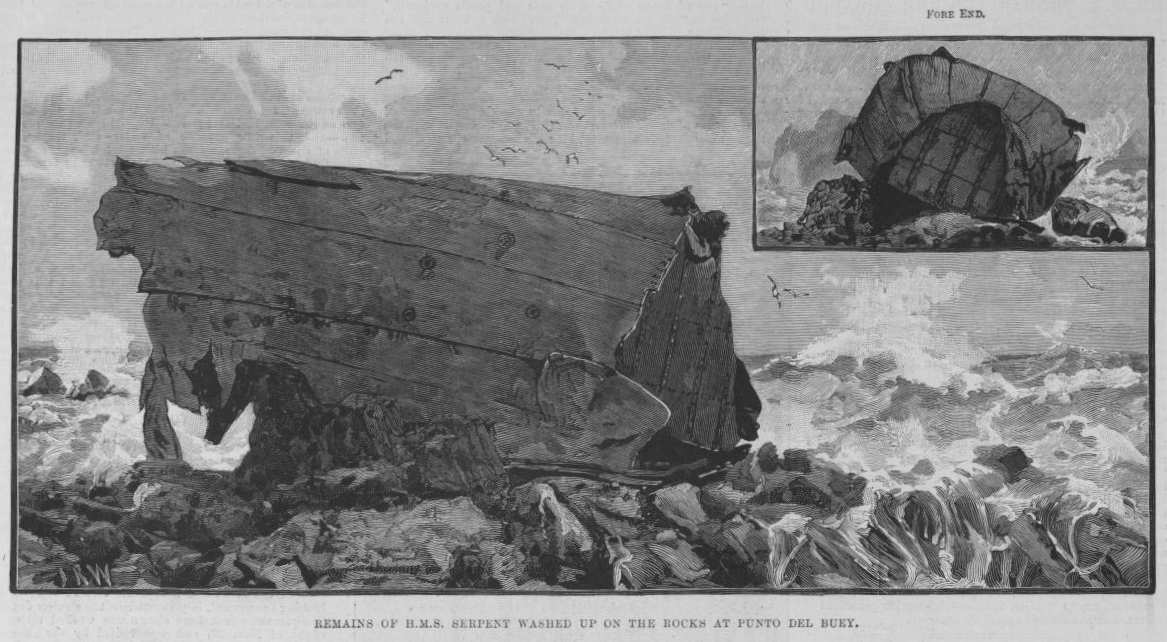
The remains of the Serpent washed up on the rocks at Punto del Buey. Illustrated London News, 1890

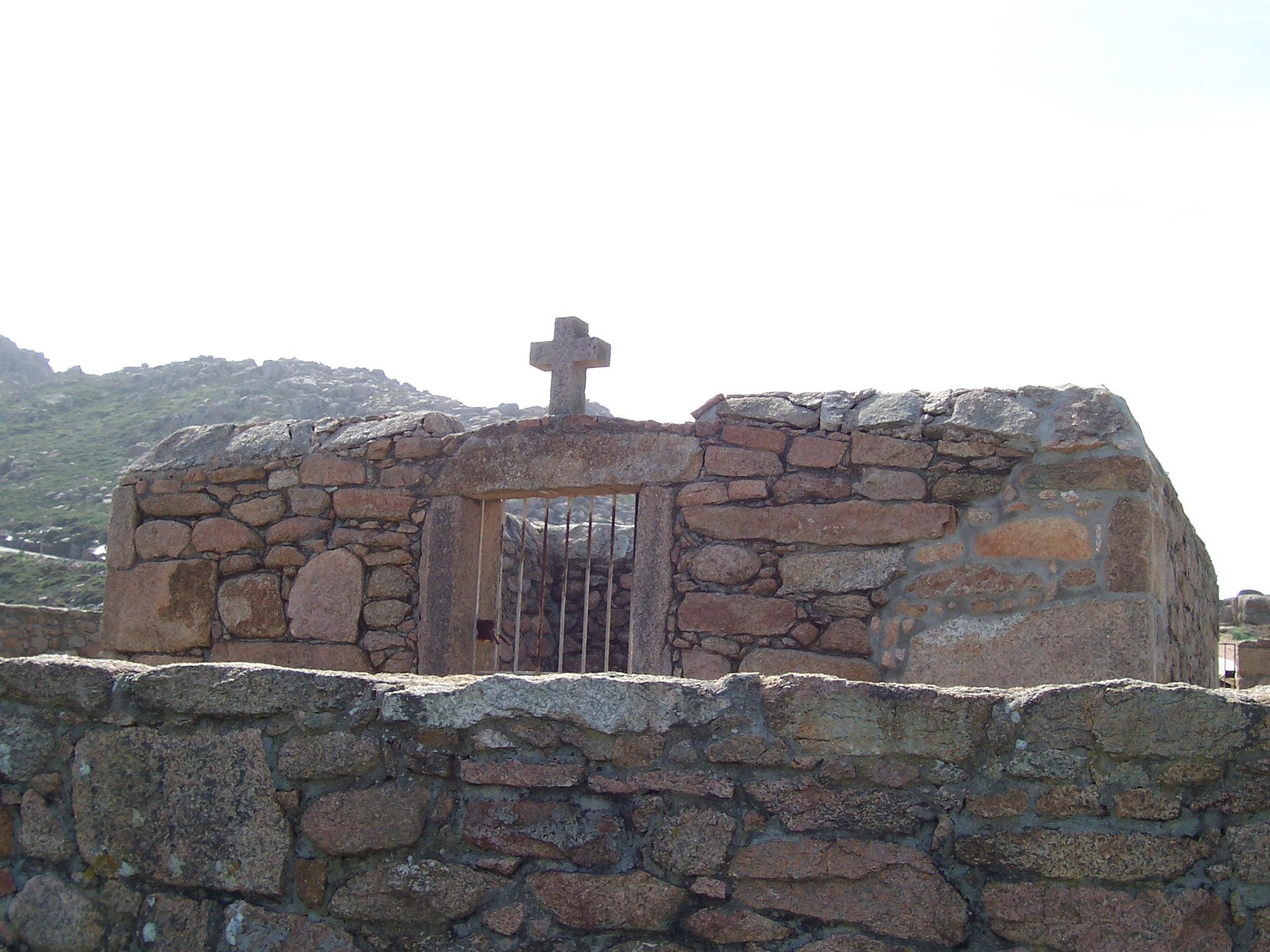
Cemiterio dos ingleses (English cemetery in Galician language), in Camariñas, built for the victims of this shipwreck.

== Anchor ==
The anchor was located in 2024 adorning a house in Muxía (La Coruña), though it was recovered from the sea about 25 years previously.

== See also ==
- HMS Captain: another Royal Navy ship sunk off the Galician coast in 1870
