= HMS Tartar (1886) =

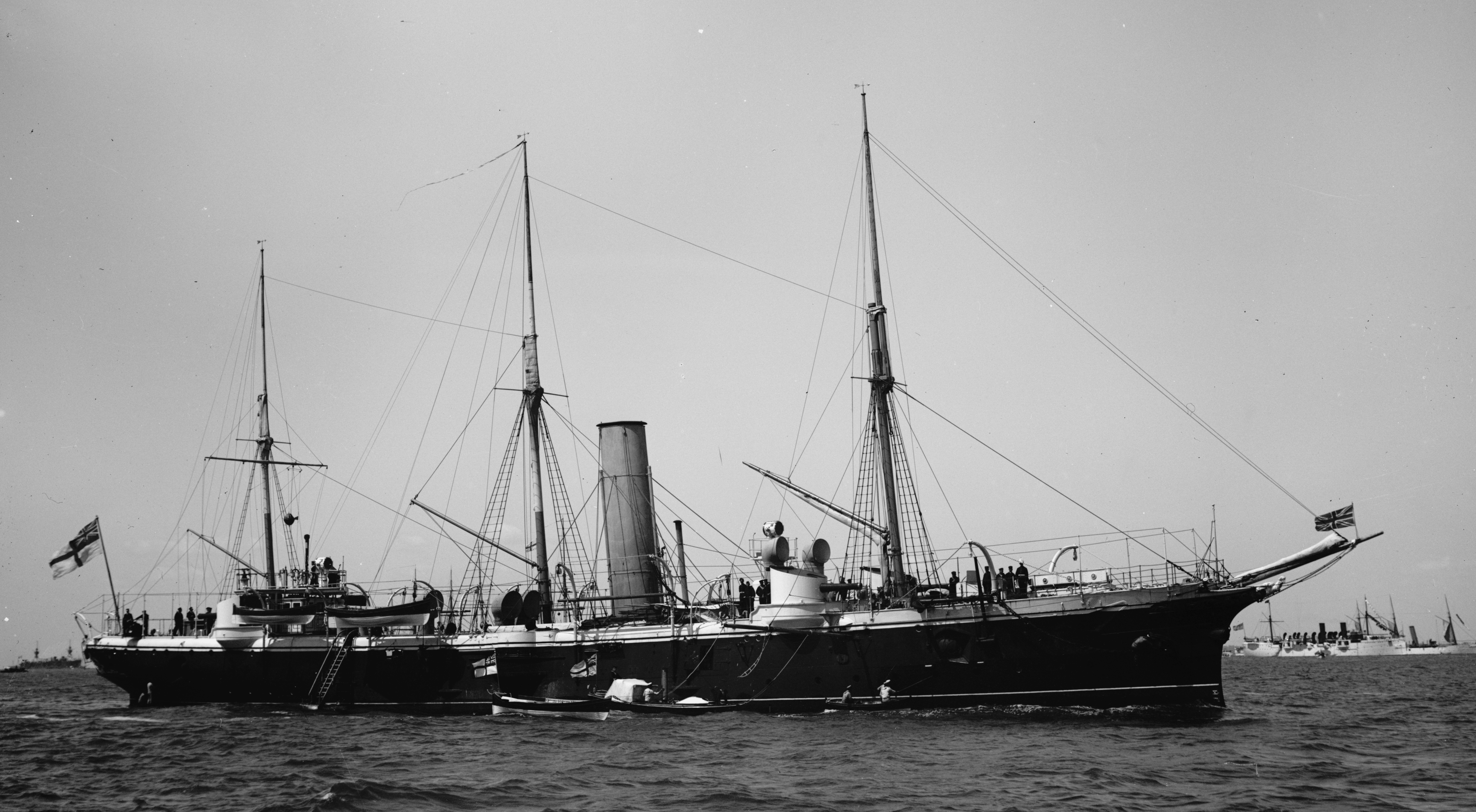

History

United Kingdom
- Name: HMS Tartar
- Builder: J. & G. Thompson, Glasgow
- Launched: 28 October 1886
- Fate: Sold on 3 April 1906

General characteristics
- Class & type: Archer-class torpedo cruiser

HMS Tartar was an Archer-class torpedo cruiser of the Royal Navy, built by J. & G. Thompson at Glasgow and launched on 28 October 1886.

In 1899, a small naval brigade with a 7-pounder gun from the Tartar saw service in the Second Boer War.

She was one of twelve vessels sold at auction at Chatham Dockyard on 3 April 1906 and was sold for £5,450.
