= HMS Royalist (1883) =

Royal Navy ship

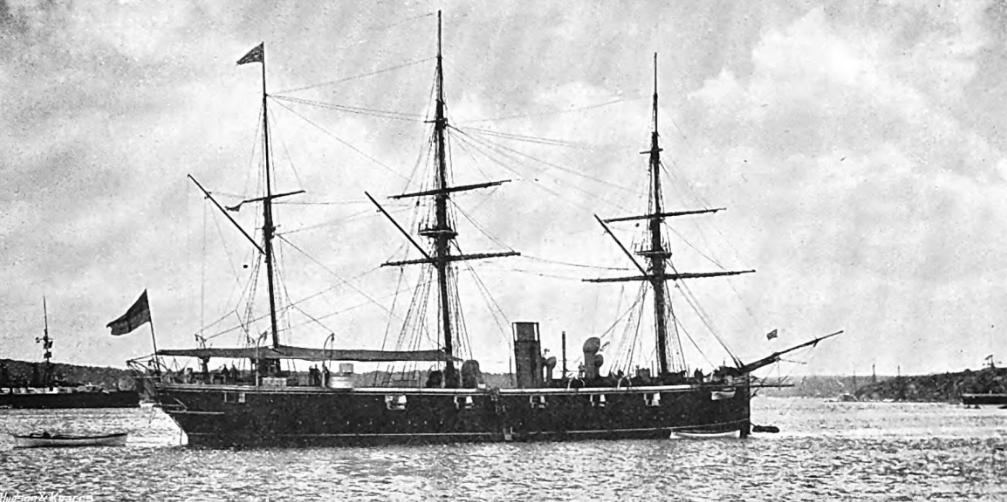
- Royalist c.1898

History

United Kingdom
- Name: HMS Royalist
- Namesake: Royalists (Cavaliers)
- Builder: Devonport Dockyard
- Cost: £52,134 (hull); £16,039 (machinery)
- Laid down: 27 April 1881
- Launched: 7 March 1883
- Commissioned: 14 April 1886
- Renamed: Colleen on 1 December 1913
- Fate: Depot ship at Queenstown, Ireland from 1900; Transferred to the Irish Free State on 19 February 1923.

Irish Free State
- Name: Colleen
- Namesake: Irish cailín, "girl"
- Fate: Broken up in 1950

General characteristics
- Class & type: Satellite-class sloop (corvette from 1884)
- Displacement: 1,420 tons
- Length: 200 ft (61 m) pp
- Beam: 38 ft (12 m)
- Draught: 15 ft 9 in (4.80 m)
- Installed power: 1,470 ihp (1,096 kW)
- Propulsion: Single horizontal compound-expansion steam engine; Single screw
- Sail plan: Barque-rigged
- Speed: 13 kn (24 km/h)
- Range: Approximately 6,000 nmi (11,000 km) at 10 kn (19 km/h)
- Complement: 170–200
- Armament: 8 × BL 6-inch/100-pounder (81cwt) Mk II guns; 1 × light gun; 4 × machine guns
- Armour: Internal steel deck over machinery and magazines

HMS Royalist was a Satellite-class composite screw sloop of the Royal Navy, built in 1883 and hulked as a depot ship in 1900. She was renamed Colleen in 1913, transferred to the Irish Free State in 1923 and broken up in 1950.

== Construction ==
Royalist was ordered from Devonport Dockyard and laid down on 27 April 1881. She was launched on 7 March 1883 and reclassified as a corvette in 1884 before being commissioned for the first time on 14 April 1886.

She was built of an iron frame with wooden planking (hence "composite") and her class was unique in being the only wooden or composite ships of the Royal Navy to be fitted with an armoured deck. She was fitted with a horizontal compound-expansion steam engine by Maudslay, Sons and Field. This engine produced 1,470 indicated horsepower (1,096 kW) and drove a single screw. Masts and spars were provided for a barque rig.

Although four of her sister ships were armed with two 6-inch and ten 5-inch breech-loading guns, Royalist, in common with Heroine and Hyacinth, received a homogenous outfit of eight BL 6-inch/100-pounder (81cwt) Mk II guns, complemented with a light gun and 4 machine guns.

== Royal Navy service ==
Initially on service with the Cape of Good Hope Station, she commenced service on the Australia Station in May 1888. Ships on the Australia Station were active in the Pacific in the management of British colonies and protectorates.

Under the command of Captain Edward Davis, Royalist conducted a survey in 1891-92, visiting: Vanuatu and New Caledonia (10 December 1889 to 18 June 1891); Papua New Guinea and Solomon Islands (18 June 1891 to 9 April 1892); and Gilbert Islands, Marshall Islands and Ellice Islands (14 April 1892 to 30 August 1892).

In September 1891, several Kalikoqu tribesmen killed a European trader operating on Uki Island named Fred Howard. In response, Royalist launched a punitive expedition against the village responsible, killing several of the tribesmen who were involved in the murder along with burning the village and destroying several of its canoes. On 27 May 1892, Captain Davis proclaimed the Gilbert Islands to be a British Protectorate. On Tarawa, this proclamation averted a massacre of a local faction, the House of Auatubu, badly beaten in battle the day before by their enemies, the House of Teabike.

During the visit of the Royalist each of the Ellice Islands in 1892, Captain Davis reported on trading activities and traders on each of the islands visited. He reported that the islanders wanted him to hoist the British flag on the islands, however Captain Davis did not have any orders regarding such a formal act.

During the Samoan civil unrest in 1899, Royalist took part in operations with HMS Porpoise and HMS Tauranga. She left the Australia Station in June 1899.

In February 1900 she was hulked and used for harbour service, she was renamed Colleen on 1 December 1913. The Antarctic explorer Tom Crean, who had been part of both Captain Scott's and Ernest Shackleton's expeditions, served in Colleen as a boatswain during the later years of World War I.

== Irish service ==
Colleen was transferred to the Irish Free State on 19 February 1923 and broken up in 1950.
