= HMS Mohawk (1886) =

Cruiser of the Royal Navy

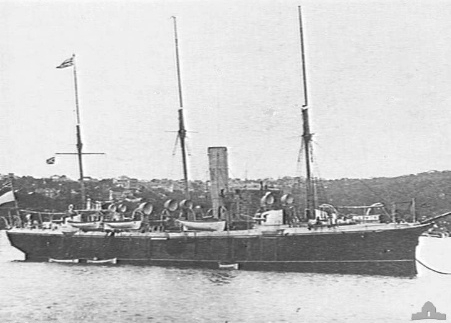
- HMS Mohawk anchored in Sydney Harbour in 1897

History

United Kingdom
- Name: HMS Mohawk
- Builder: J. & G. Thompson, Glasgow
- Laid down: 2 March 1885
- Launched: 6 February 1886
- Fate: Sold to Garnham for breaking up at Chatham on 4 April 1905

General characteristics
- Class & type: Archer-class torpedo cruiser
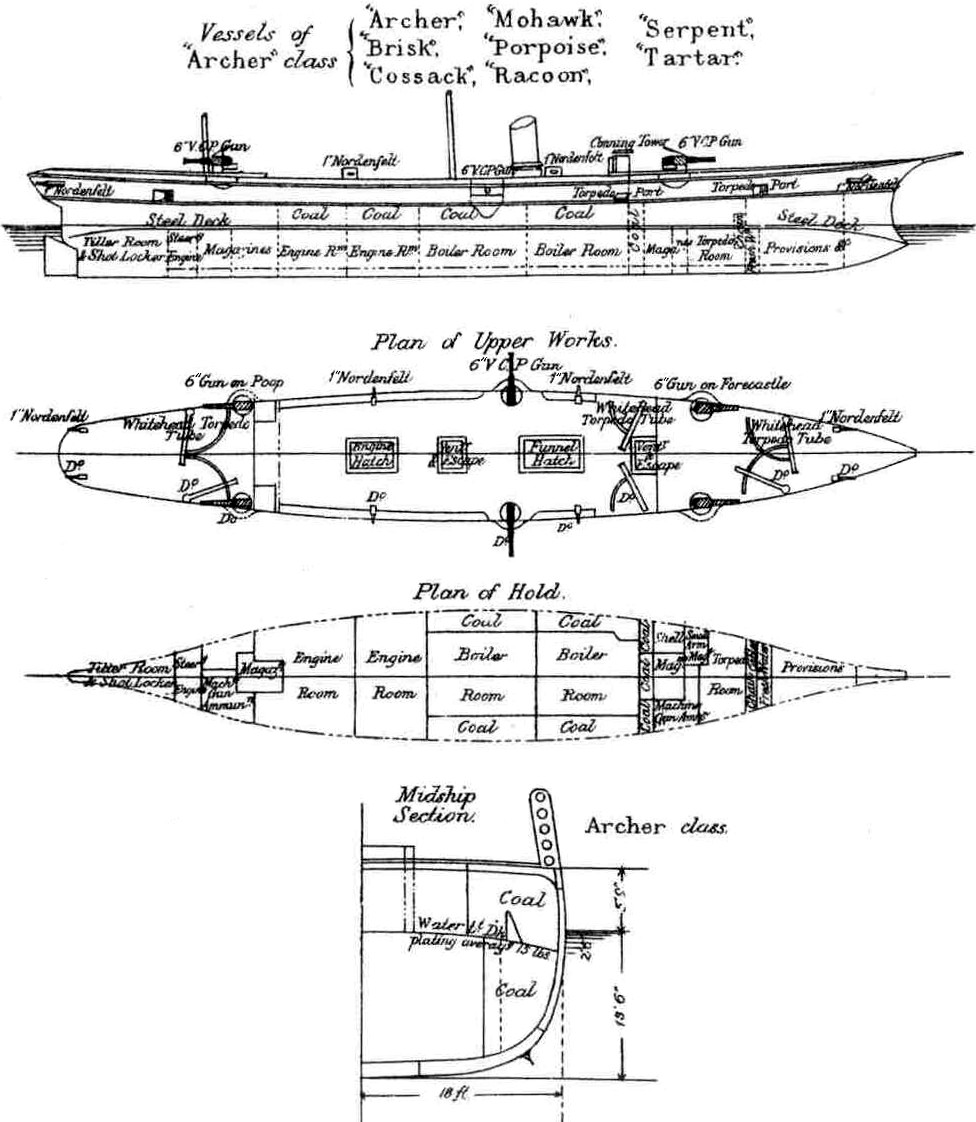
- Notes

HMS Mohawk was an Archer-class torpedo cruiser of the Royal Navy, built by J. & G. Thompson at Glasgow and launched on 6 February 1886.

Her first service was on the Cape Station between 1890 and 1892. In 1893, Mohawk was serving on the North America and West Indies Station when civil disorder broke out on the island of Dominica. A party of Marines and sailors were landed to assist the local police in stopping the rioting. Four rioters were killed and several injured on both sides, including the commanding officer of Mohawk, Commander Edward Henry Bayley, before order was restored.

Mohawk commenced service on the Australia Station in December 1897. During the Boxer Rebellion in China, she escorted the New South Wales Naval Brigade to Peking before commencing service on the China Station. On 24 April 1901 she was paid off into the Fleet Reserve at Chatham.

She was recommissioned on 8 January 1903 by Commander Edward G. Wright Davy to replace the Scout as special service vessel at Constantinople, as part of the Mediterranean Station, with Commander Ernest Gaunt transferring from that ship to be in command as she arrived at Constantinople the following month. In April 1904 she saw service during the Dervish war, including supplying men for the landing party that stormed and captured the forts at Illig. She returned to England in 1905, and on 4 April that year was sold to Garnham for £4,850 for breaking up at Chatham.
