= HMS Porpoise (1886) =

Cruiser of the Royal Navy

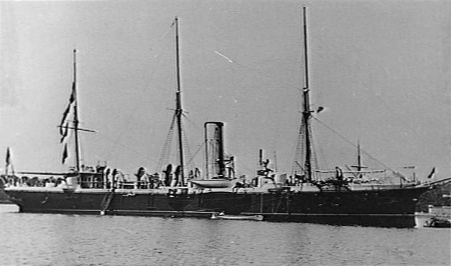
- HMS Porpoise anchored in Sydney Harbour in 1900.

History

United Kingdom
- Name: HMS Porpoise
- Builder: J. & G. Thompson, Glasgow
- Launched: 7 May 1886
- Fate: Sold on 10 February 1905 for breaking up at Bombay.

General characteristics
- Class & type: Archer-class torpedo cruiser
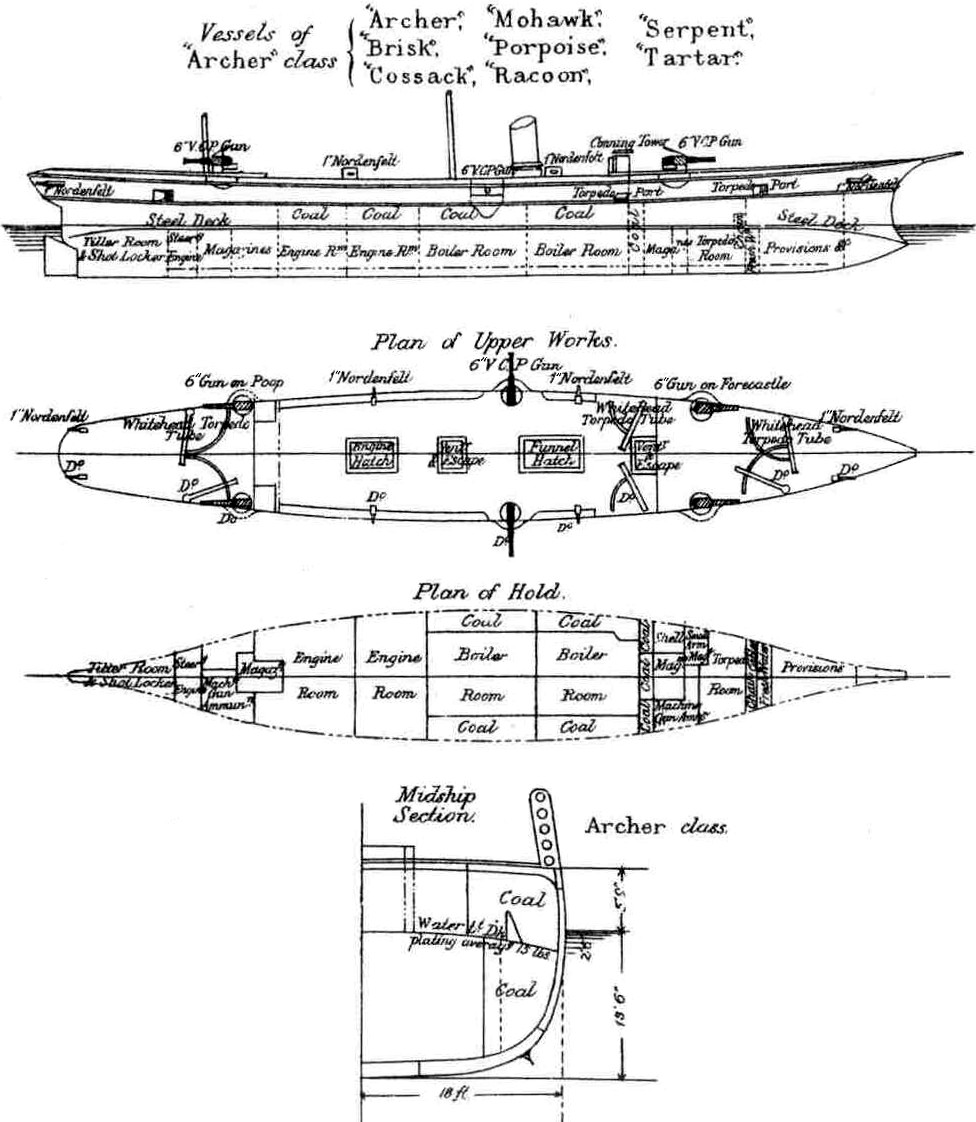
- Notes

HMS Porpoise was an Archer-class torpedo cruiser of the Royal Navy, built by J. & G. Thompson at Glasgow and launched on 7 May 1886.

Commenced service on the Australia Station in December 1897. During the Samoan civil unrest in 1899, she took part in operations with HMS Royalist and HMS Tauranga. She left the Australia Station and was paid off at Portsmouth 20 May 1901. After a refit at Sheerness, she joined the A Division of the Medway Fleet Reserve in February 1903. She was sold at Bombay on 10 February 1905.

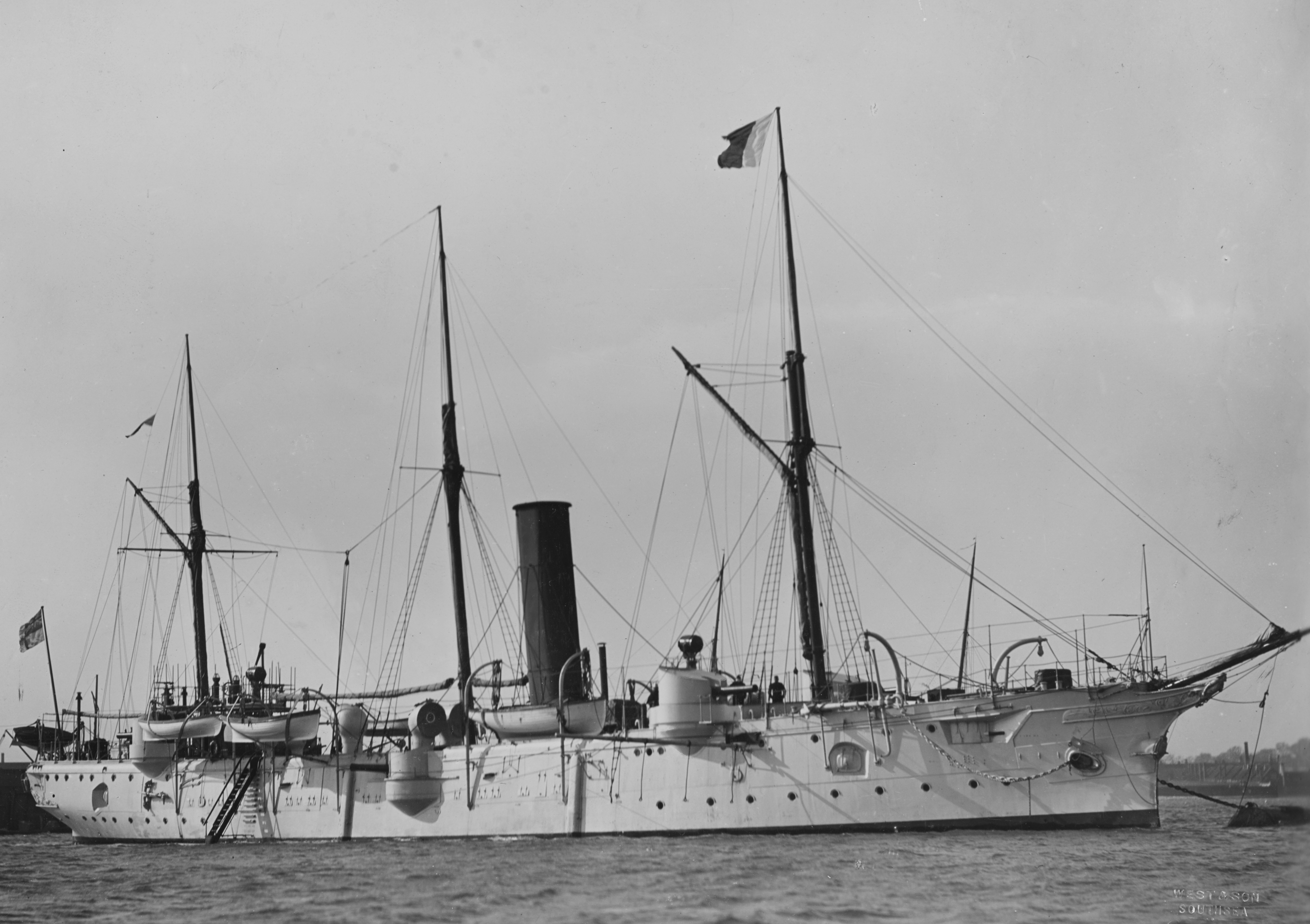
HMS Porpoise, date of photo unknown
