= Kalikoqu =

The Kalikoqu are an ethnic Melanesian tribe who are concentrated in the New Georgia island of the Solomon Islands. Prior to European colonization, they resided in the eastern side of the western Roviana lagoon and established the concept of the right to property by interlinking it with marriage. Before, during and after the British Empire's establishment of the Solomon Islands Protectorate in the late Victorian era, the Kalikoqu were greatly expanded by neighboring Melanesian tribes immigrating to the Solomon Islands interior.

== History ==
There were several distinct Melanesian tribes which inhabited the Roviana lagoon region and the coast of the New Georgia island during the nineteenth century, consisting of the Taghosaghe, Lio Zuzuloqo, Vuragare, and Koloi people respectively. In September 1891, several Kalikoqu tribesmen killed a European trader operating on Uki Island named Fred Howard. In response, the Royal Navy warship HMS Royalist launched a punitive expedition against the village responsible, killing several of the tribesmen who were involved in the murder along with burning the village and destroying several of its canoes. Though tribes in the region had been immigrating eastwards beforehand toward the Roviana lagoon, this process accelerated after the punitive expedition. In the following decades, British colonial administrators, missionaries, and traders exchanged European goods, such as foodstuffs, weapons, and ornaments with the Kalikoqu to established levels of influence with their chiefs. In return, the Kalikoqu exchanged valuable goods such as rings (which they called poata) with the British.

Additionally, another newly emerged Saikile tribe comprised Nusa Roviana settlers, Roviana-Kazukuru, Kalena Bay, Hoava, Hoeze, Taghosaghe, and Marovo people that inhabited the eastern side of the Roviana Lagoon until the late nineteenth century.

Christian missions are another important factors altering the traditional beliefs and the tenure pragmatics of Saikile and Kalikoqu people in Roviana. Roviana inhabitants mostly believe in the Christian Fellowship Church (CFC) that was established in 1961 as the first independent church of the Solomon Islands. This plays a role in an indigenous religious secessionist movement and became mixed with traditional beliefs. The church runs its own schools and works on projects to exploit logging and cocoa plantations.

== Society ==
For a long time, these groups shared kinship and established the rules of each chief through tribal intermarriage between the inland groups of Kazukuru, Taghosaghe, Lio Zuzuloqo and Hoava with the coastal groups of Vuragare and Koloi. In pre-colonial time, tribal movements of the Roviana polity empowered chiefs called bangara and gave them great authority over land and sea territories. The chief could have direct “ownership” of these territories by means of entitlements for resource. To avoid future conflicts, the chief made a responsible for shared land and sea with trusteeship called kinopu. Each of his three grandchildren was apportioned an entitlement domain in order to exploit forested land, the reefs, and islands.

Today, in spite of the loss of the intermarriage to exchange lineages for identifying each tribe, the Kalikoque and Saikle polities still have socio-political dominance over land and sea in New Georgia Island and the lagoon barrier islands. These two systems historically remain the centralization of chiefly power and the composition of the Roviana kinship system. The Roviana kinship system still connects individuals to multiple kin groups in order to allow the advantages of land and sea entitlements.

The significant portions of people between land and sea territories entrusts chiefs with trusteeship or kinopu. This enables fishers to have chiefly access to different sea territories and join with competing groups to utilize their tenure rights for territorial extension.

Moreover, the CFC church also can persuade chiefs to barter with the church for valuable objects, such as shell rings, by controlling its members in terms of resource management (1999, p. 437). This prevailing exchange system causes chiefs to monopolize economic and political power.

== See also ==
- Tomako
