= HMS Archer (1885) =

Cruiser of the Royal Navy

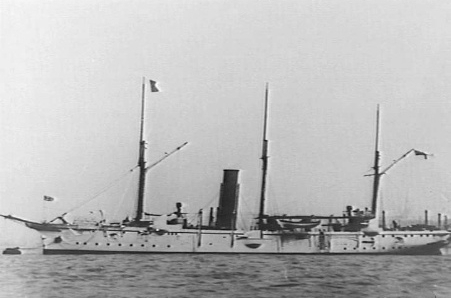
- HMS Archer c.1888

History

United Kingdom
- Name: HMS Archer
- Builder: J & G Thomson, Glasgow
- Yard number: 226
- Launched: 23 December 1885
- Fate: Sold in April 1905 for scrapping

General characteristics
- Class & type: Archer-class torpedo cruiser
- Displacement: 1770 tons
- Length: 240 ft (73 m)
- Beam: 36 ft (11 m)
- Draught: 13.5 ft (4.1 m)
- Installed power: 2500 ihp (increased to 4,500 with forced draught)
- Propulsion: Twin 2-cylinder compound steam engines; Four boilers; Twin screws
- Speed: 17.5 kn (32.4 km/h)
- Range: 7,000 nmi (13,000 km) at 10 kn (19 km/h)
- Complement: 176 men
- Armament: Six 6-inch (5 ton) guns; Eight 3-pounder QF guns; Two machine guns; One light gun; One 14-inch torpedo tube; Four torpedo carriages
- Armour: 3/8-inch deck; 1-inch gunshields; 3-inch conning tower

HMS Archer was an Archer-class torpedo cruiser of the British Royal Navy which was built by the Glasgow shipbuilder J & G Thomson between 1885 and 1888. She served on overseas stations, including operations off Africa, China and Australia. She was sold for scrap in 1905.

== Construction ==
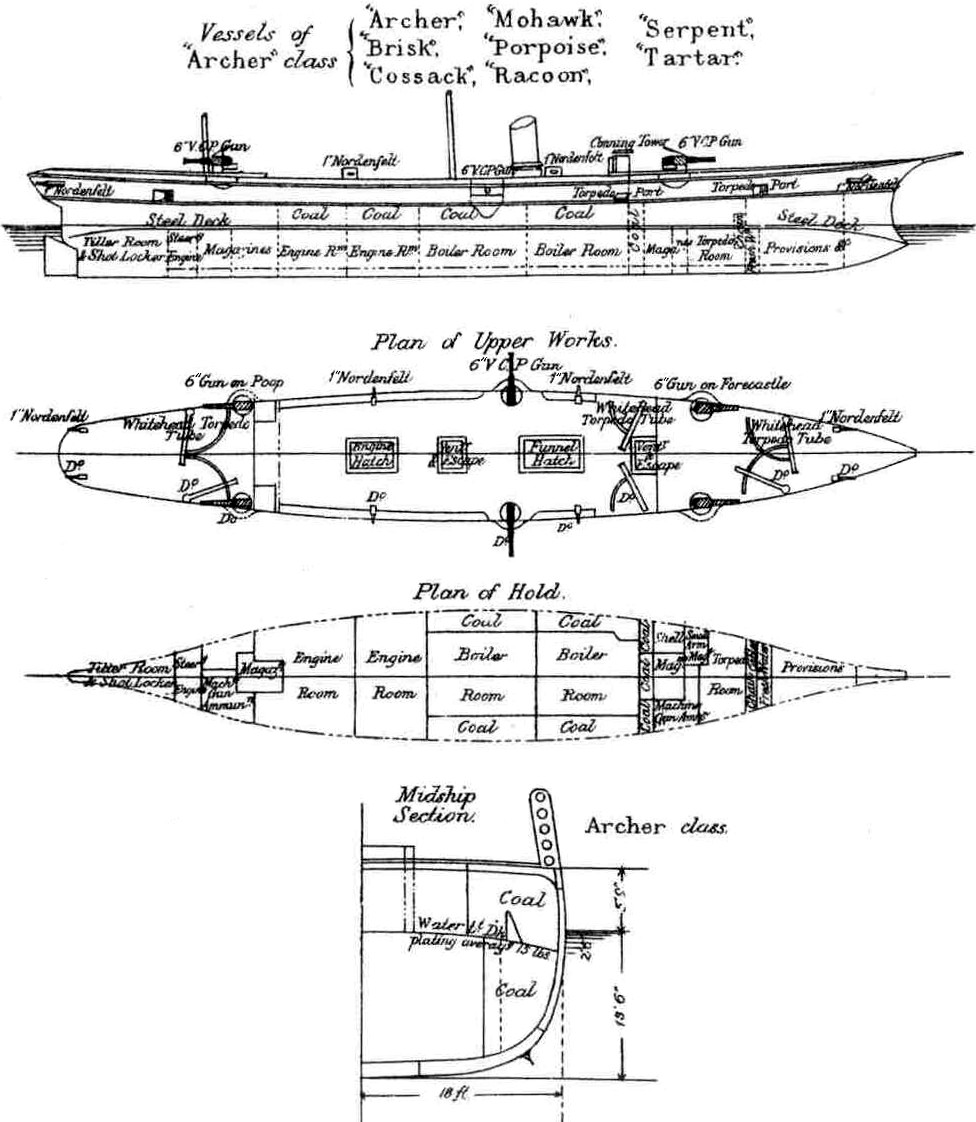
Plans of Archer-class torpedo cruiser

Archer was laid down at J & G Thomson's Clydebank shipyard on 2 March 1885 as the lead ship of her class of torpedo cruisers, was launched on 23 December that year and completed by Commander John Ferris on 11 December 1888 in Devonport.

Torpedo cruisers were small, relatively fast, ships intended to defend the fleet against attacks by hostile torpedo boats, while themselves being capable of attacking hostile fleets with torpedoes. The Archer class were enlarged derivatives of the earlier Scout-class, and carried a heavier armament than the previous class.

Archer was 240-foot (73.15 m) long overall and 225-foot (68.58 m) between perpendiculars, with a beam of 36-foot (10.97 m) and a draught of 14-foot-6-inch (4.42 m). Displacement was 1,770 long tons (1,800 t) normal and 1,950 long tons (1,980 t) full load. The ship's machinery consisted of two horizontal compound steam engines rated at 2,500 indicated horsepower (1,900 kW) under natural draught and 3,500 indicated horsepower (2,600 kW), which were fed by four boilers and drove two shafts for a speed of 16.5 knots (30.6 km/h; 19.0 mph). 475 tons of coal were carried, sufficient to give a range of 7,000 nautical miles (13,000 km; 8,100 mi) at 10 knots (12 mph; 19 km/h), and three masts were fitted.

Armament consisted of six 6-inch (5 ton) guns, backed up by eight 3-pounder QF guns and two machine guns. Three 14-inch torpedo tubes completed the ship's armament. Armour consisted of a 3/8 inch (10 mm) deck, with 1 inch (25 mm) gunshields and 3 inches (76 mm) protecting the ship's conning tower. The ship had a complement of 176 officers and ratings.

== Service ==
Archer served on the Cape of Good Hope and West Coast of Africa Station from 1889 to 1890.

Archer was serving on the China Station in July 1894, when on the eve of the First Sino-Japanese War, Japanese Forces surrounded Seoul. Archer landed an armed party to protect the British Consul-General after a confrontation between him and Japanese troops.

She served on the Australia Station from 7 September 1900 until 5 December 1903(?), under Commander John Philip Rolleston.

During Australian geologist's Sir Douglas Mawson's first major independent geological field trip to the New Hebrides (now Vanuatu) from April to September 1903 aboard the Ysabel, Archer was also made available to the expedition, under the auspices of the British Deputy Commissioner of the New Hebrides, Captain Ernest Rason. (Note: AKA British resident commissioner, 1902-1907)

Archer was decommissioned in 1905 and sold in April 1905 for £4,800 to Forrester, Swansea, for scrap.

== Citations ==
=== Sources ===
- Bastock, John (1988), Ships on the Australia Station, Child & Associates Publishing Pty Ltd; Frenchs Forest, Australia. ISBN 0-86777-348-0
- Chesneau, Roger; Kolesnik, Eugene M, eds. (1979). Conway's All The World's Fighting Ships 1860–1905. London: Conway Maritime Press. ISBN 0-85177-133-5.
- Clowes, William Laird (1903). The Royal Navy: A History From the Earliest Times to the Death of Queen Victoria: Volume VII. Sampson Low, Marston and Company.
