= HMS Racoon (1887) =

Cruiser of the Royal Navy

History

United Kingdom
- Name: HMS Racoon
- Ordered: 1885
- Builder: Devonport Dockyard
- Cost: Hull: £60,600; Machinery: £31,000
- Laid down: 1 February 1886
- Launched: 6 May 1887
- Commissioned: 1 March 1888
- Decommissioned: 1 January 1905
- Fate: Sold to G Cohen on 4 April 1905

General characteristics
- Class & type: Archer-class torpedo cruiser
- Displacement: 1770 tons
- Length: 140 ft (43 m)
- Beam: 36 ft (11 m)
- Draught: 13.5 ft (4.1 m)
- Installed power: 2,500 ihp (1,900 kW); 4,500 ihp (3,400 kW) forced draught
- Propulsion: Twin 2-cylinder compound steam engines; Four boilers; Twin screws
- Speed: 17.5 kn (32.4 km/h)
- Range: 7,000 nmi (13,000 km) at 10 kn (19 km/h)
- Complement: 176 men
- Armament: Six 6-inch (152 mm) guns; Eight 3-pounder (47 mm) QF guns; Two machine guns; One light gun; One 14-inch (356 mm) torpedo tube; Four torpedo carriages
- Armour: deck: .375 in (9.5 mm); Gunshields: 1 in (25 mm); Conning tower: 3 in (76 mm)

HMS Racoon, sometimes spelled HMS Raccoon, was an Archer-class torpedo cruiser of the Royal Navy. Racoon was laid down on 1 February 1886 and came into service on 1 March 1888. She served on the East Indies Station where, on 27 August 1896, she was involved in the bombardment of Sultan Khalid's palace during the 40 minute Anglo–Zanzibar War.

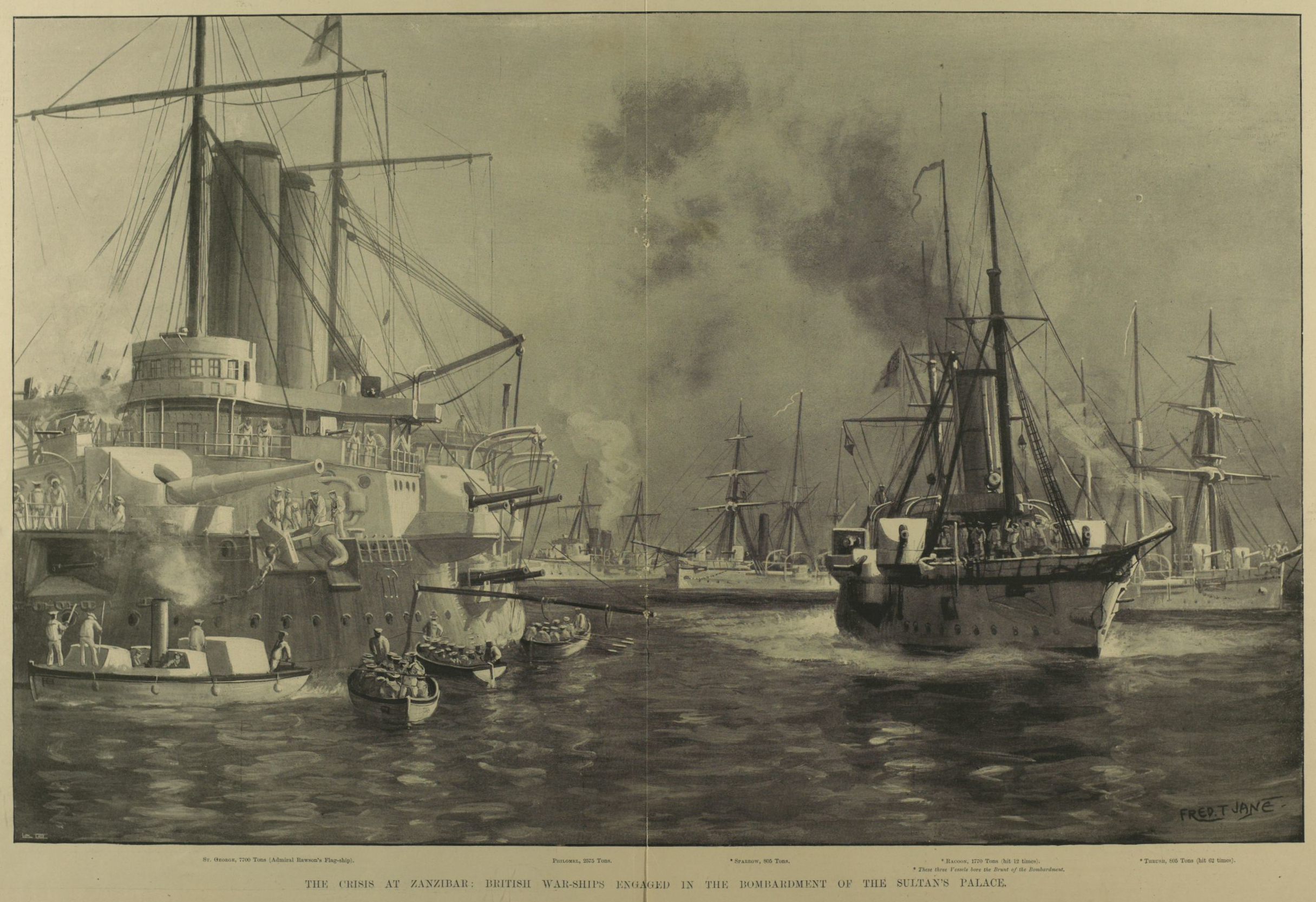
The Crisis at Zanzibar, British War-Ships engaged in the Bombardment of the Sultan's Palace, Racoon (right side, foreground)

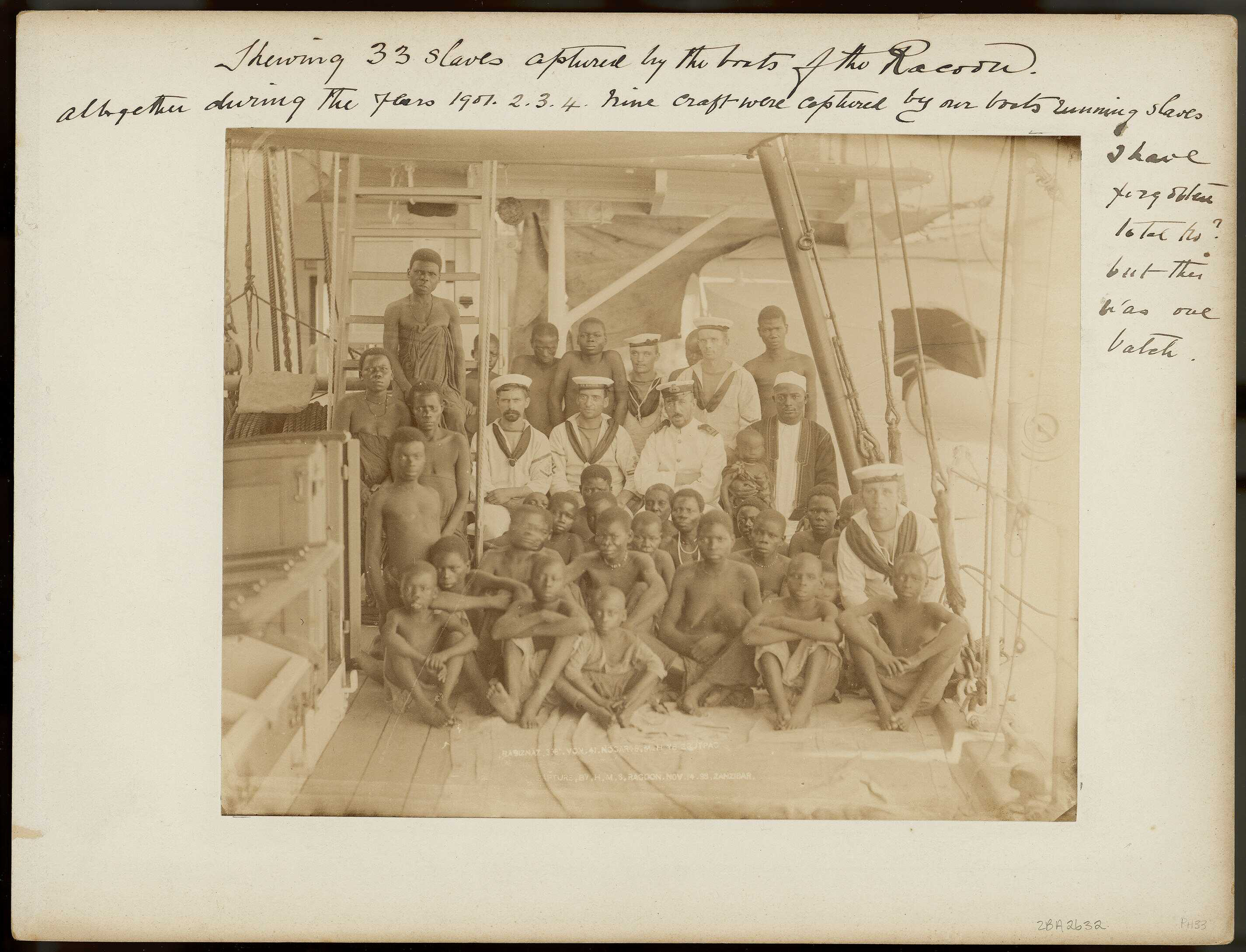
Showing 33 slaves captured by the boats of the Racoon in 1901

In early May 1901 Racoon returned to the United Kingdom, and was paid off at Sheerness on 6 July 1901.

She was decommissioned on 1 January 1905 and sold for scrap.
