= HMS Tauranga =

Pearl-class cruiser

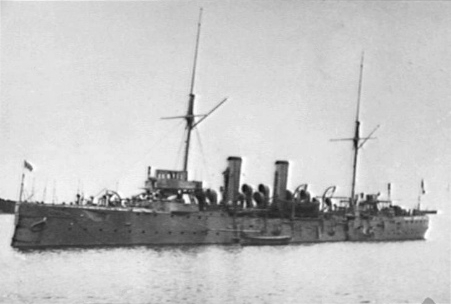
- HMS Tauranga, Tasmania in 1902.

History

United Kingdom
- Name: HMS Phoenix
- Builder: J & G Thomson, Glasgow
- Launched: 28 October 1889
- Renamed: Tauranga, 1890
- Fate: Sold in July 1906 for breaking up.

General characteristics
- Class & type: Pearl-class cruiser
- Displacement: 2,575 tons
- Length: 278 ft (85 m) oa; 256 ft (78 m) pp
- Beam: 41 ft (12 m)
- Draught: 15 ft 6 in (4.72 m)
- Installed power: 7,500 ihp (5,600 kW) on forced draught
- Propulsion: 2 × 3-cylinder triple-expansion steam engines; 4 × double-ended cylindrical boilers; 2 screws
- Speed: 19 knots (35 km/h; 22 mph)
- Complement: 217
- Armament: 8 × QF 4.7 inch (120 mm) guns; 8 × 3-pounder guns; 4 × machine guns; 2 × 14-inch (356 mm) torpedo tubes
- Armour: Deck: 1–2 in (25–51 mm); Gunshields: 2 in (51 mm); Conning tower: 3 in (76 mm)

HMS Tauranga was a Pearl-class cruiser of the Royal Navy. The vessel was originally named Phoenix and built by J & G Thomson, Glasgow. She was launched on 28 October 1889. Renamed on 2 April 1890, as Tauranga as part of the Auxiliary Squadron of the Australia Station. She arrived in Sydney with the squadron on 5 September 1891. During the Samoan civil unrest in 1899, she took part in operations with HMS Porpoise and HMS Royalist. Spending between 1901 and 1903 in reserve at Sydney before being assigned to the New Zealand division of the Australia Station. She left the Australia Station on 14 December 1904. She was sold for £8500 in July 1906 to Thomas Ward for breaking up.

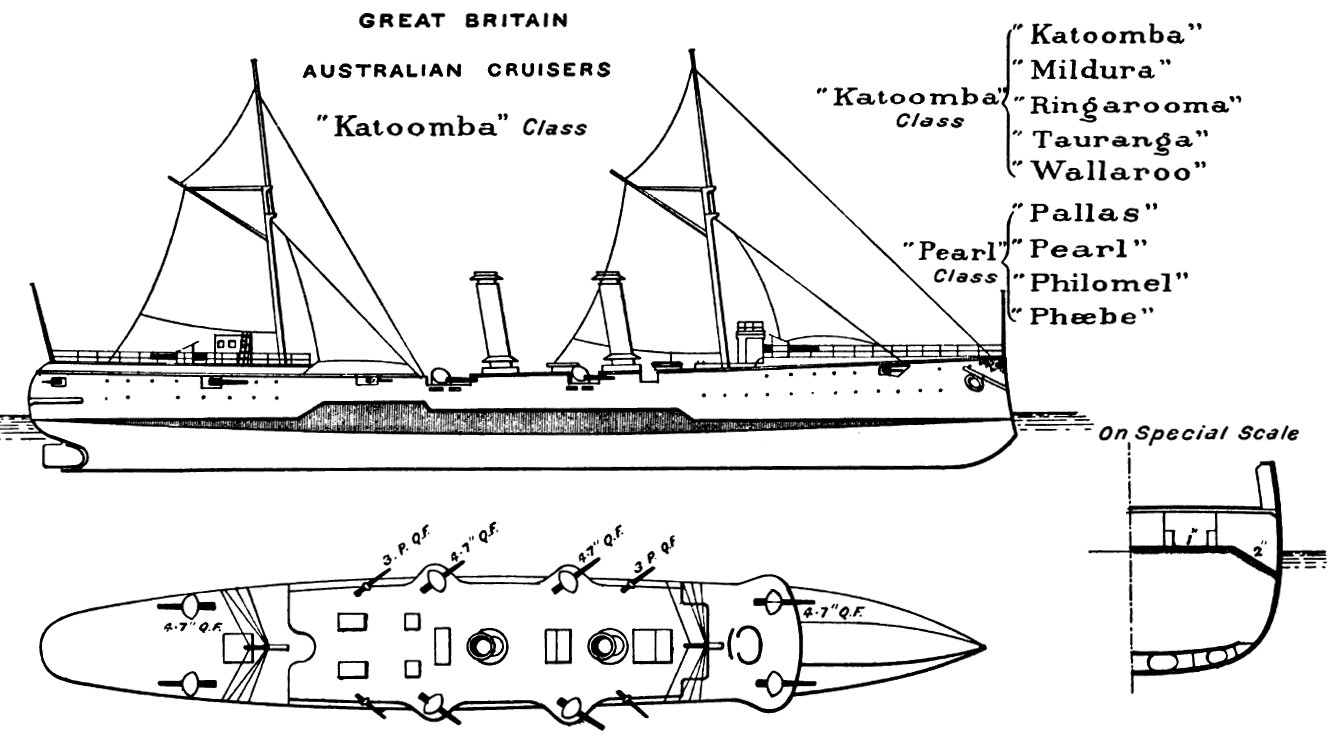
A Pearl-class cruiser from Brassey's Naval Annual, 1897

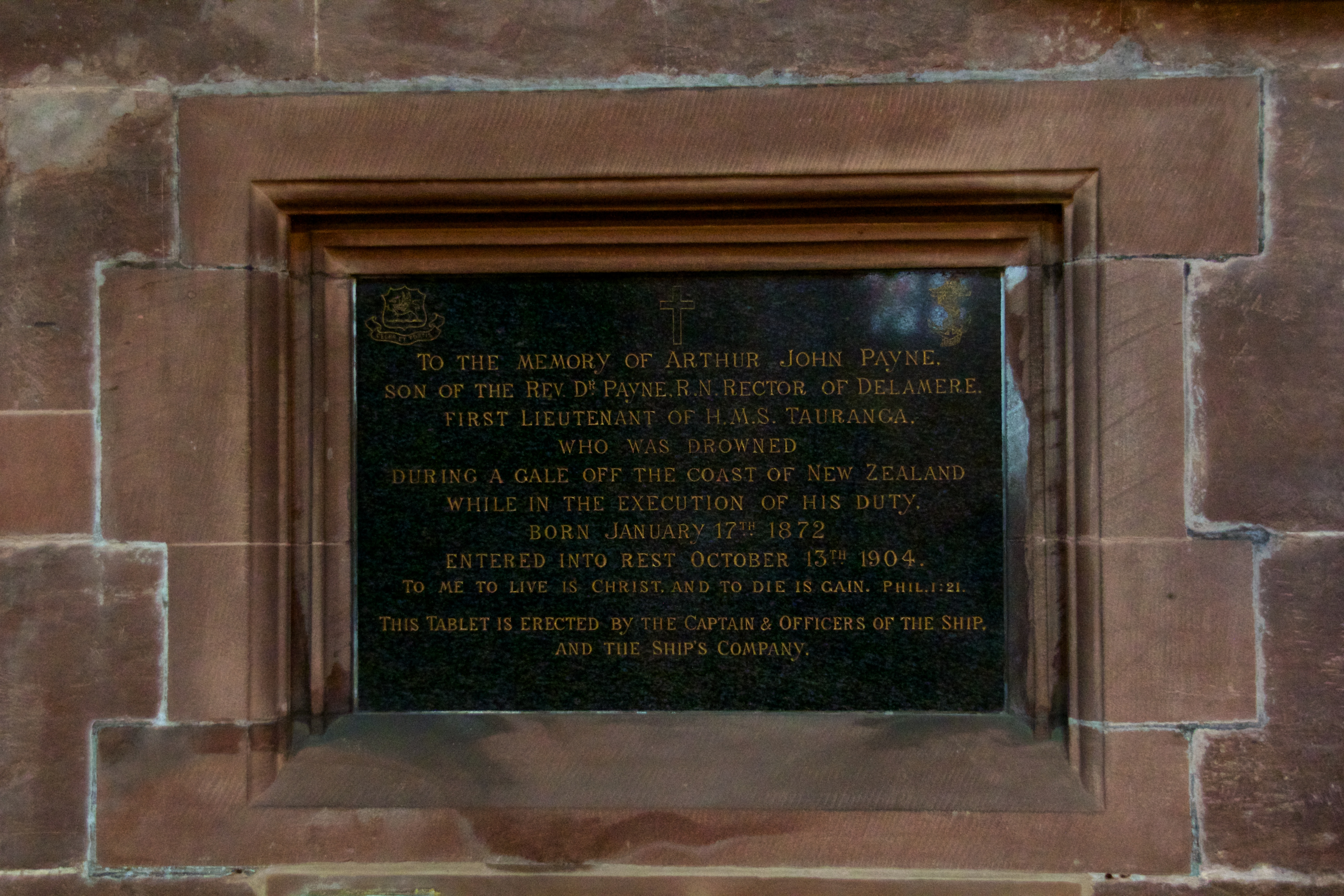
Memorial to Payne, First Lieutenant of H.M.S. Tauranga, in Chester Cathedral

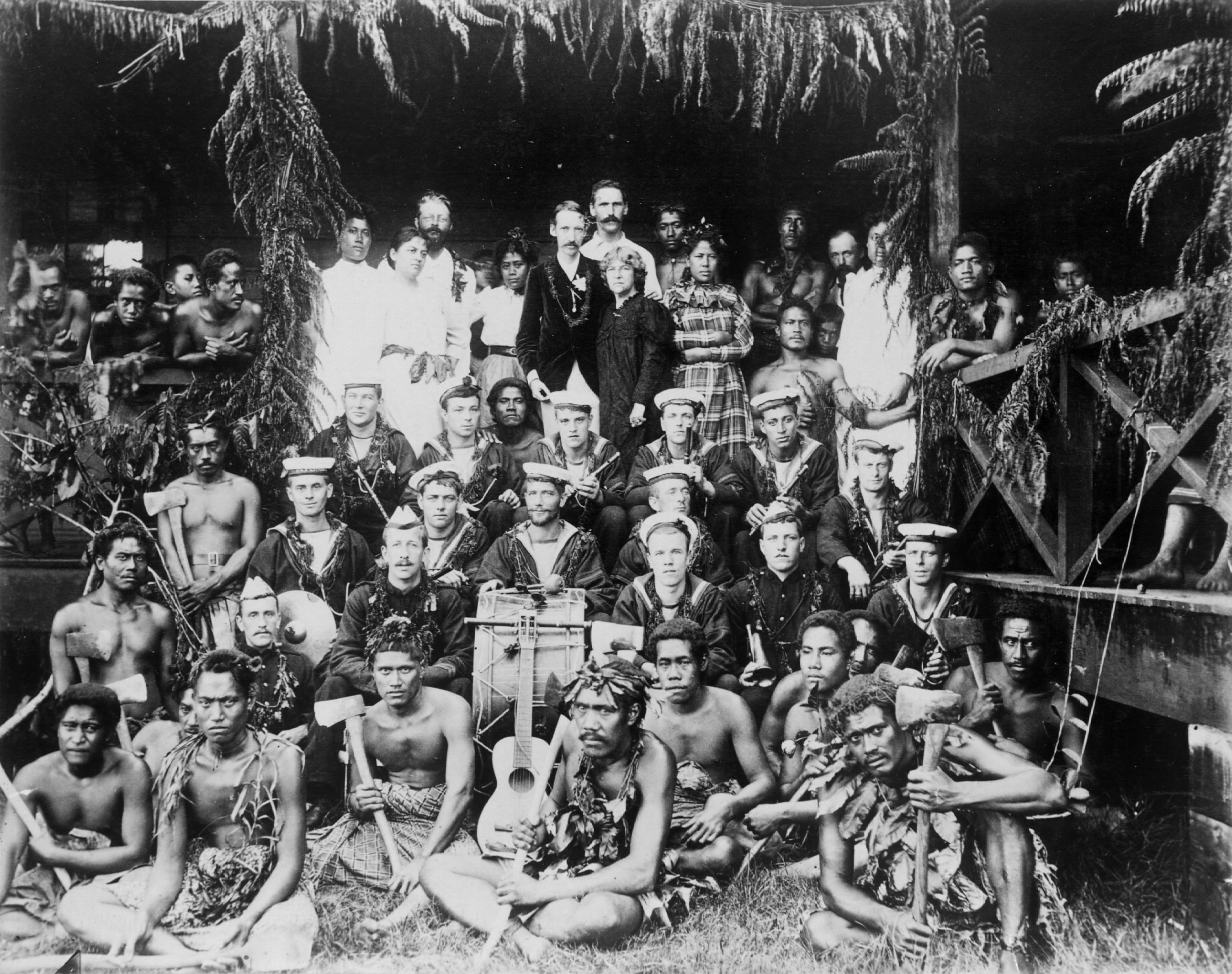
Robert Louis Stevenson, his family and Samoans, and the band of HMS Tauranga at Vailima (Samoa) (photo by Alfred James Tattersall).
