= Archer-class cruiser =

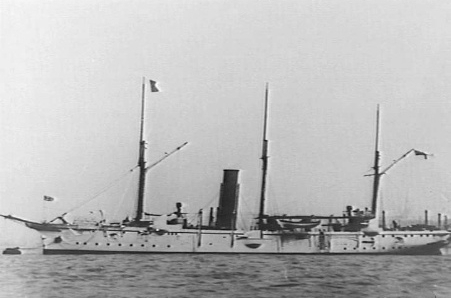
- HMS Archer circa 1888

Class overview
- Name: Archer class
- Builders: J & G Thomson, Glasgow; Devonport Dockyard
- Operators: Royal Navy
- Preceded by: Scout class
- Succeeded by: Barracouta class
- Built: 1885–1886
- In commission: 1890–1906
- Completed: 8
- Lost: 1
- Retired: 7

General characteristics
- Type: 3rd class torpedo cruiser
- Displacement: 1,770 long tons (1,798 t)
- Length: 240 ft (73 m) overall; 225 ft (69 m) between perpendiculars
- Beam: 36 ft (11 m)
- Draught: 14 ft 6 in (4.42 m)
- Installed power: 4,500 hp (3,400 kW) at forced draught
- Propulsion: 2 cyl HDACE, 4 boiler
- Speed: 17.5 knots (32.4 km/h; 20.1 mph) at forced draught
- Range: 7,000 nmi (13,000 km; 8,100 mi) at 10 knots (19 km/h; 12 mph)
- Complement: 176
- Armament: 6 × 6 in (152.4 mm) guns; 6 × 3-pounder gun; 2 × machine guns; Torpedo tubes (all above water): 1 × 14 in (360 mm) bow; 2 × twin 14 in side-launching
- Armour: 0.375 in (9.5 mm) deck; 25 mm (0.98 in) gunshield; 75 mm (3.0 in) conning tower

The Archer class was a class of eight torpedo cruisers of the Royal Navy. They were envisaged from 1883 onwards by Admiral Sir Astley Cooper Key to replace existing sloops as ancillaries for working with the British Fleet and also for trade protection; a total of twenty such ships were planned by him, but only eight were built. Six ships were ordered under the 1884 Programme and built by J & G Thomson at Clydebank in Glasgow. A further two ships were ordered under the 1885 Programme, and these were built at the Devonport Dockyard with all ships completed between 1887 and 1888. These ships mainly served in the British Empire's foreign fleets being on various stations throughout the north Atlantic, Pacific, and Indian oceans. Throughout their careers they were involved in a number of local conflicts including the Anglo-Zanzibar War, First Sino-Japanese War, and the Boxer Rebellion.

== Design ==
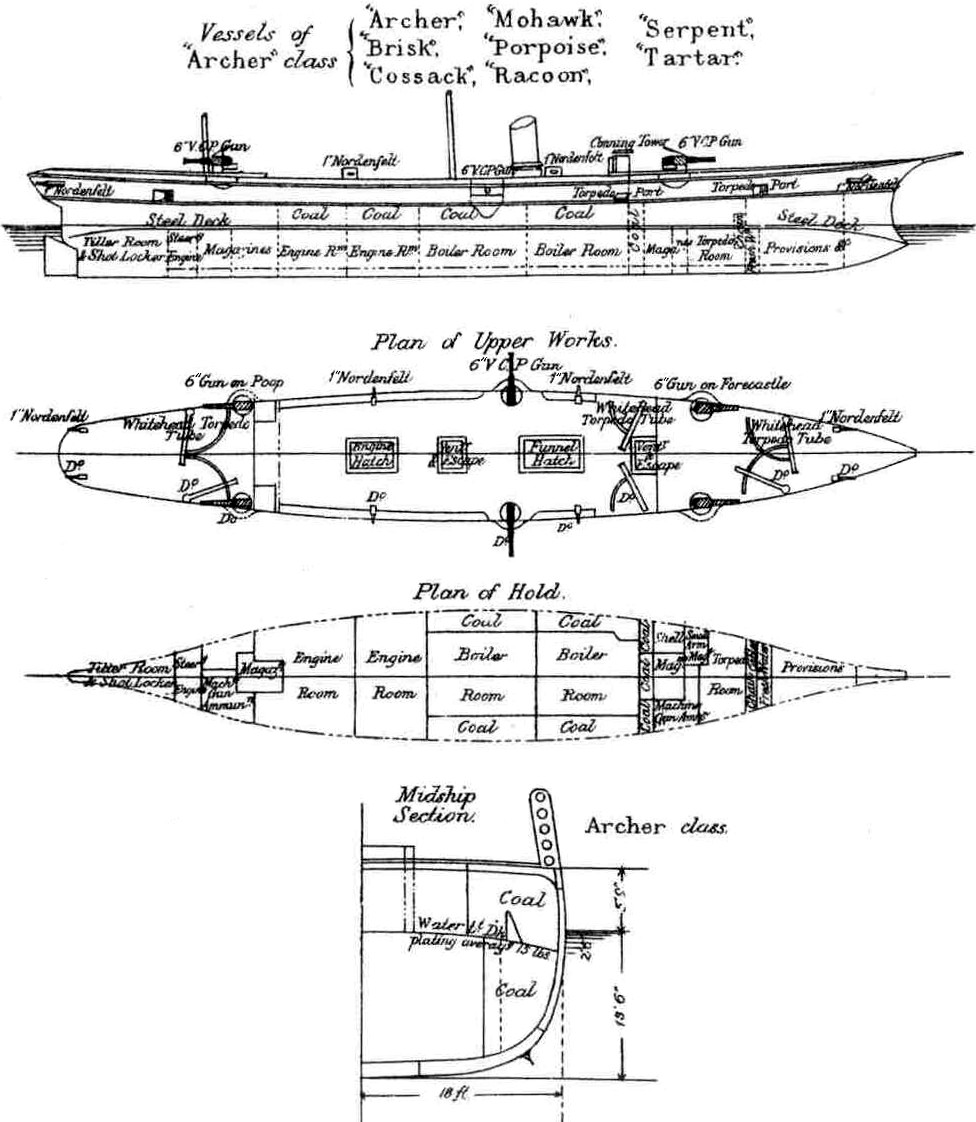
Design for the class

These third class cruisers of the Royal Navy were also known as torpedo cruisers. They were designed to meet and defeat smaller torpedo boats while also being able to strike larger vessels with their own torpedoes. To this end they filled the role that would be soon taken over by early destroyer designs.

The Archer class were enlarged derivatives of the earlier Scout class. They carried their six 6-inch guns in single mounts, three on each beam, mounted on sponsons with one pair immediately aft of the foremast, one pair between the single funnel and the mainmast, and one pair immediately forward of the mizzenmast. The ships were built with three masts (for which sails were provided), but the mainmast was subsequently removed from most ships during refits between 1897 and 1900. Eventually eight torpedo tubes were fitted, with a total of 12 torpedoes carried.

== Cost ==
The six ships of the 1884 Programme were all contracted to Thomson as a fixed price of £55,916 each, plus £31,667 each for machinery. The two further vessels were built at Devonport Dockyard at a cost of £60,606 each for the hulls; their machinery was contracted from Harland & Wolff at a cost of £31,000 each.

== Ships ==
| Name | Builder | Laid down | Launched | Completed | Commissioned | Fate |
|---|---|---|---|---|---|---|
| Archer | Thomson | 2 March 1885 | 23 December 1885 | July 1887 | 11 December 1888 | Sold 4 April 1905 |
| Mohawk | Thomson | 2 March 1885 | 6 February 1886 | July 1887 | 16 December 1890 | Sold 4 April 1905 |
| Brisk | Thomson | 2 March 1885 | 8 April 1886 | 23 March 1888 | 20 March 1888 | Sold May 1906 |
| Porpoise | Thomson | 2 March 1885 | 7 May 1886 | 12 February 1888 | 15 February 1888 | Sold February 1905 |
| Cossack | Thomson | 2 March 1885 | 2 June 1886 | July 1888 | 1 January 1889 | Sold 4 April 1905 |
| Tartar | Thompson | 2 March 1885 | 28 October 1886 | 30 June 1888 | 30 June 1891 | Sold 3 April 1906 |
| Serpent | Devonport | 9 November 1885 | 10 March 1887 | March 1888 | 15 July 1889 | Wrecked 10 November 1890 |
| Racoon | Devonport | 1 February 1886 | 6 May 1887 | July 1888 | 4 July 1888 | Sold April 1905 |

== Fate ==
On 10 November 1890, HMS Serpent was caught in heavy storm off the northwest coast of Spain. The ship attempted to reach shelter but ran aground near Camariñas on the treacherous Costa da Morte of Galicia. All but three of her crew were killed. The resulting court martial investigating the loss of Serpent concluded that the ship had been lost as a result of a navigation error.

The seven other ships of the Archer class would quickly lose their usefulness to the Royal Navy as shipbuilding and design moved at a rapid pace around the turn of the century. All seven ships would be sold for scrap in 1905 and 1906.
