= Scout-class cruiser =

British torpedo cruisers

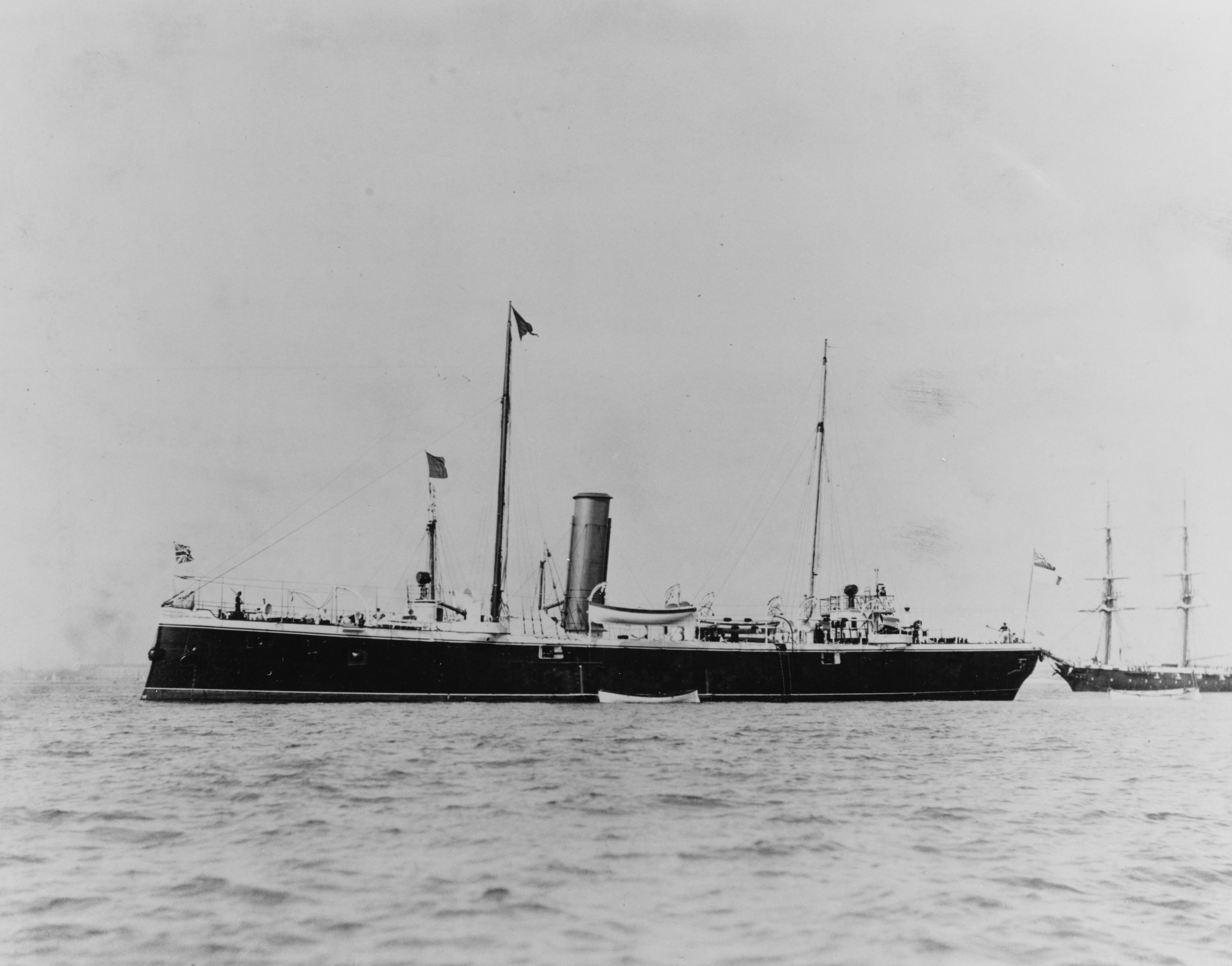
- HMS Fearless, second and last of the class

Class overview
- Name: Scout class
- Builders: George Thomson & Co; Barrow Shipbuilding Company
- Operators: Royal Navy
- Succeeded by: Archer-class cruiser
- Built: 1884–1887
- In commission: 1885–1905
- Completed: 2
- Retired: 2

General characteristics
- Type: Torpedo cruiser
- Displacement: 1,580 tons
- Length: 220 feet (67 m) lbp; 225 feet (69 m) wl
- Beam: 34.3 feet (10.44 m)
- Draught: 14.5 feet (4.42 m)
- Installed power: 3,200 ihp (2,400 kW)
- Propulsion: 4 boilers; 2-cylinder steam engines; 2 propellers
- Sail plan: 3 masts with sails and a jib
- Speed: 17 knots (31 km/h; 20 mph) (planned)
- Complement: 147
- Armament: 4 × 5 in (13 cm) Mk III guns (as built); 8 × 3 lb (1.4 kg) QF guns; 2 × 5-barrel 0.45 in (1.1 cm) Nordenfelt organ guns; 4 × Torpedo carriages; 3 × Torpedo tubes
- Armour: 3/8 inch (0.95 cm) deck; 1 inch (2.5 cm) at torpedo ports; 3/8 inch (0.95 cm) gunshields

The Scout class was a pair of torpedo cruisers operated by the Royal Navy between 1885 and 1905. The ships, Scout and Fearless, were some of the first of their kind with the Navy and were ordered to counteract similar French ships. While the ships were intended to serve with a fleet, they were too slow to do so and instead operated independently for the next two decades. Both ships were sold off by 1905, although the design served as the basis for further British cruisers.

== Development and design ==
During the early 1880s, the Royal Navy worked to develop a new type of warship, known as the torpedo cruiser. Later designated as third-class cruisers, these vessels had the speed, size, and maneuverability to serve as a vanguard for ocean-going fleets of ironclads. In combat, doctrine called for the cruisers to sail ahead and engage enemy vessels, primarily torpedo boats, with their guns and torpedo tubes. The Scout class was one of the first iterations of the design, developed in 1883 as a scaled down protected cruiser with the speed and weaponry expected of a gun vessel or dispatch ship. The design was developed in response to the French Navy laying down the Condor-class torpedo cruisers in 1882.

The ships had a displacement of 1,580 tons, length between perpendiculars of 220 ft (67 m), waterline length of 225 ft (69 m), beam of 34.3 ft (10.44 m), draught of 14.5 ft (4.42 m), and a complement of 147. The ships were equipped with 450 tons of coal that fed four boilers and two-cylinder Hathorn Davey steam engines which turned two propellers. They were rated to produce 3,200 indicated horsepower (2,400 kW) and a top speed of 17 knots (31 km/h; 20 mph), although Scout achieved 17.6 knots (32.6 km/h; 20.3 mph) during her engine trials. The ships were initially armed with four Mk III 5 in (13 cm) guns, eight quick fire 3 lb (1.4 kg) guns, two five-barreled 0.45 in (1.1 cm) Nordenfelt organ guns, four torpedo carriages, and three torpedo tubes. Twenty torpedoes were carried in total, with one torpedo tube on the bow, one on the stern, and one underwater tube near the bow. The ships were rigged with three sails and a jib. The ships also featured a 3/8 inch (0.95 cm) steel deck below the waterline, 1 inch (2.5 cm) around the torpedo ports, and 3/8 inch (0.95 cm) gunshields.

Before the ships had even been launched, the design served as the basis for the slightly larger Archer-class cruiser, which featured a different arrangement of torpedo tubes, stronger ram, and a main armament of 6 in (15 cm) guns.

== Service history ==
Two ships in the class were ordered as part of the Navy's 1883-84 fiscal program, which were named Scout and Fearless and built by the firm of George Thomson and Barrow Shipbuilding Company, respectively. Both ships were completed by 1885, but the Navy was disappointed by their performance. They performed poorly at sea and were too slow to sail with a fleet, and were instead assigned to operate independently. In 1899, the 5 in (13 cm) guns were swapped for four 4.7 in (12 cm) quickfire guns, and later modifications added a breakwater and two gaffs to each. Scout was sold off in 1904, and Fearless in 1905.

== Ships in class ==
Data
Name	Builder	Laid down	Launched	Completed	Fate
Scout	George Thomson & Co	8 January 1884	30 July 1885	20 August 1885	Sold, 1904
Fearless	Barrow Shipbuilding Company	22 September 1884	20 March 1886	July 1887	Sold, 1905
