= Torpedo cruiser =

Warship type

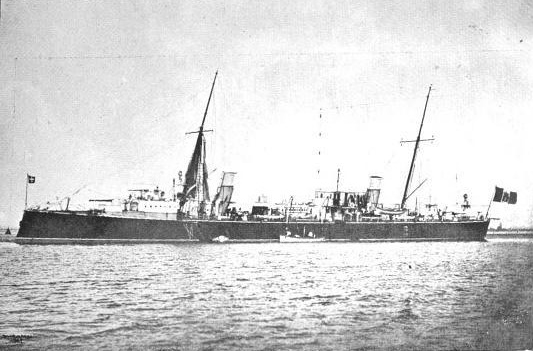
The Italian cruiser Partenope in 1895

A torpedo cruiser is a type of warship that is armed primarily with torpedoes. The major navies began building torpedo cruisers shortly after the invention of the locomotive Whitehead torpedo in the 1860s. The development of the torpedo gave rise to the Jeune École doctrine, which held that small warships armed with torpedoes could effectively and cheaply defeat much larger battleships. Torpedo cruisers fell out of favor in most of the great power navies in the 1890s, though many other navies continued to acquire them into the early 1900s.

The Imperial Japanese Navy rebuilt two Kuma-class light cruisers into torpedo cruisers during World War II. Unlike the earlier vessels, these ships were intended to launch their Type 93 torpedo oxygen torpedoes at extreme range at night to surprise enemy warships. They never saw action in their intended role, however, and were quickly converted into troop transports as well as a Kaiten (suicide torpedo) carrier.

== History ==
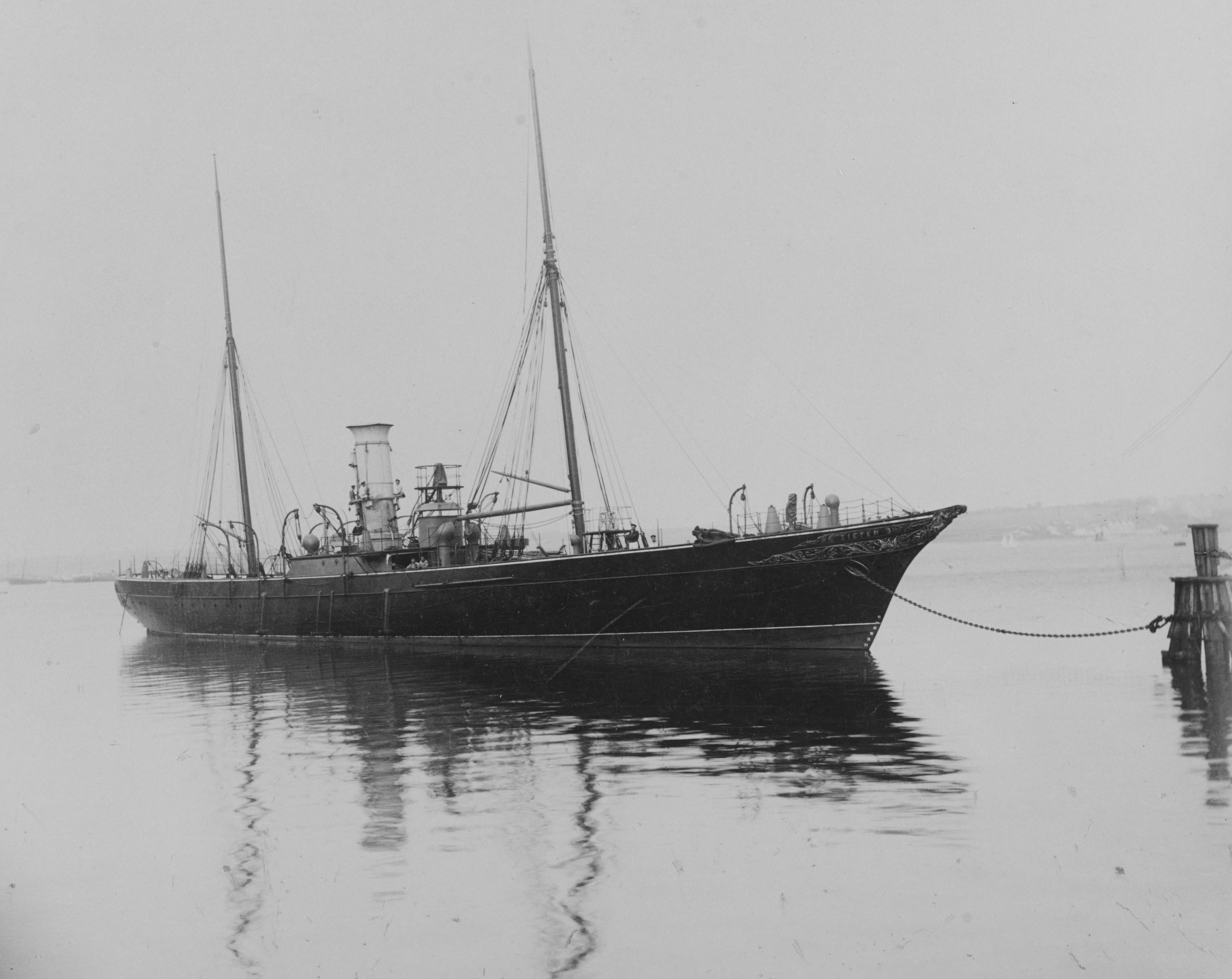
Zieten, one of the first torpedo cruisers

The torpedo cruiser emerged from the Jeune École, a strategic naval concept that argued that the large ironclad battleships then being built in Europe could be easily—and more importantly, cheaply—defeated by small torpedo-armed warships. In newly unified Germany, the new torpedo cruiser was embraced as a powerful weapon for a new navy which had no real blue-water traditions of shipbuilding or seafaring. Early German torpedo vessels were classified as avisos, the first being SMS Zieten, launched in 1876. She was initially armed with just two 380-millimetre (15 in) torpedo tubes, supplemented in 1878 by two 120 mm (4.7 in) guns and six machine guns.

The enthusiasm of the German Kaiserliche Admiralität (Imperial Admiralty) was particularly marked during the tenure of General Leo von Caprivi: a total of eight vessels were built, designed to serve with flotillas of smaller torpedo boats, and integrated into a defensive system of minefields and coastal artillery. The typical German torpedokreuzer came to be armed with a salvo of three torpedo tubes, one fixed in the bows and two on rotating mounts on either side of the hull. Their gun armament was relatively modest, with two medium-calibre weapons mounted fore and aft, and a number of smaller broadside guns in sponsons, designed primarily to defend against smaller attackers such as torpedo boats.

Concurrently with the German procurement of Zieten, the Italian Regia Marina laid down the small cruiser Pietro Micca in 1875, which was armed with a single torpedo tube and two machine guns. The Regia Marina built a further seventeen torpedo cruisers over five classes over the course of the following twenty years. Starting in 1879, the French Navy also began experimenting with the type, first with the cruiser Milan, before building a series of smaller torpedo avisos similar to Zieten. The Austro-Hungarian Navy adopted a similar organization for the confined waters of the Adriatic Sea, with flotillas of torpedo boats grouped with torpedo cruisers, which were intended to defeat enemy battleships attacking the Austro-Hungarian coast.

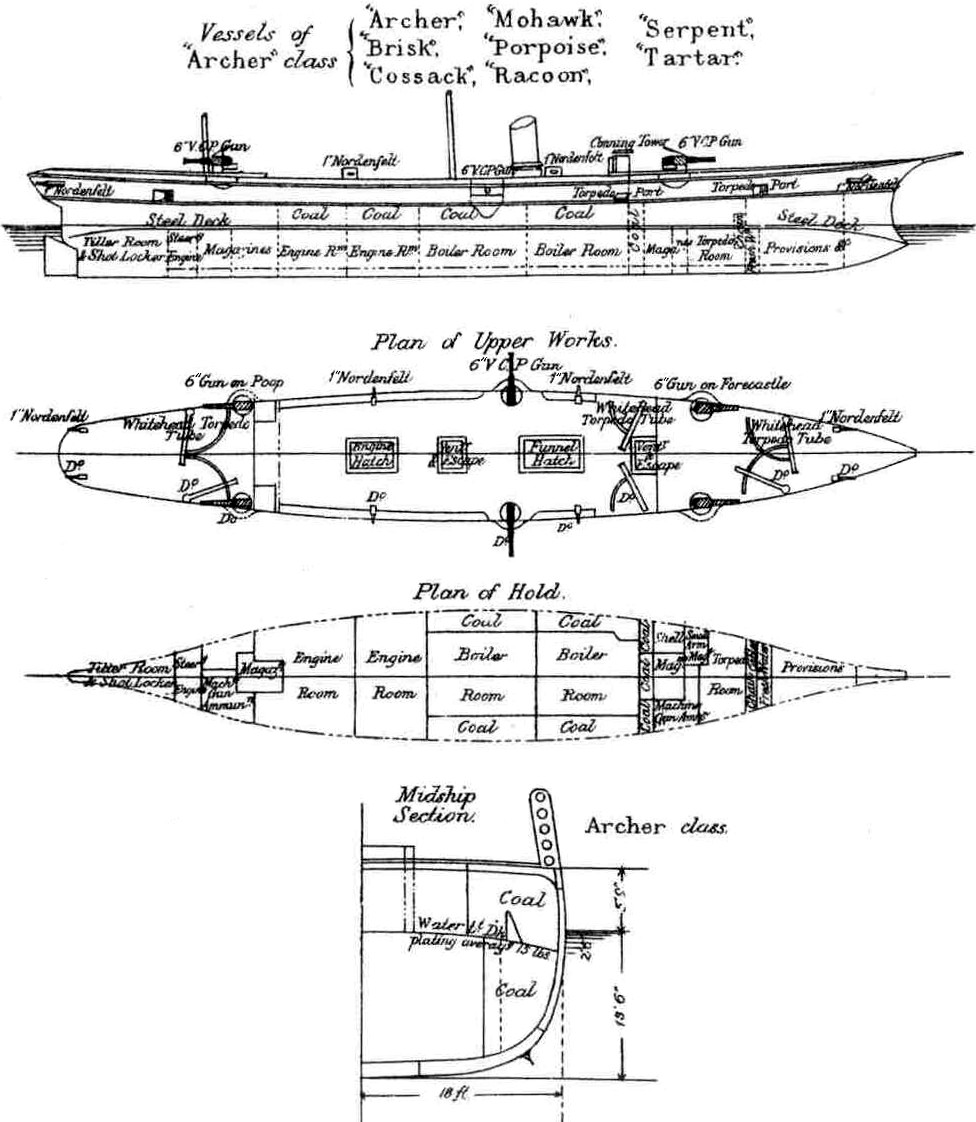
The plans of the British torpedo cruiser HMS Archer

Two of the Austro-Hungarian torpedo cruisers, Panther and Leopard, were designed by the English naval architect Sir William White, in the mid-1880s, when there was also a period of intense enthusiasm for the type at the British Admiralty. The one-off HMS Rattlesnake and the two ships of the Scout class were promptly followed by numerous torpedo gunboats, two Curlew-class torpedo gunvessels, and the larger ships of the Archer class. The torpedo cruiser was seen as a ship which had the potential to become the worldwide mainstay of the fleet, combining the utility of the gunboat, the speed of a dispatch vessel, and an attacking potential comparable to a larger ironclad - "valuable during peace, and invaluable during war". However, the Archer class were badly over-gunned, which compromised their seaworthiness, and this damaged the type's reputation in Britain: the total order for the class was reduced from twenty ships to eight, and the Royal Navy promptly abandoned the "torpedo cruiser" designation completely. This may have been an overreaction: sea-officers and ship-designers alike had urged the high command to simply reduce the gun armament, and White continued to produce what were effectively torpedo cruisers under different designations, the "third-class cruisers" of the Barracouta class and the larger Medea class, designated as "second-class protected cruisers".

Torpedo cruisers were also procured early by a South American navy. The Chilean Navy ordered in the late 1880s, at the Laird Brothers shipyard, two Almirante Lynch-class torpedo gunboats, Almirante Lynch and Almirante Condell, considered torpedo cruisers by some sources. These two ships would have a notable military success during the Chilean Civil War of 1891, when they attacked and sunk the ironclad Blanco Encalada at the Battle of Caldera Bay. Then in 1896 she acquired Almirante Simpson. The United States Navy was perhaps the only world navy which did not acquire any torpedo cruisers during this period - their procurement process for "Torpedo Cruiser No. 1" faltered due to unrealistically ambitious demands for high performance at low cost.

By this point, however, the type was falling into disfavor. The publication of Alfred Thayer Mahan's seminal work, The Influence of Sea Power upon History, in 1890 persuaded many experts to abandon the Jeune École theory in favor of a fleet centered on powerful battleships. Simultaneously, the first modern light cruisers began to emerge. These ships, such as the German Gazelle class, had the speed and torpedo armament of the earlier torpedo cruiser, but had a bigger hull which also allowed them to carry the gun armament and armor of a larger protected cruisers. Reflecting the change in thinking, Gazelle was designed as an enlarged torpedokreuzer, combining the standard salvo of three torpedo tubes with a stronger gun armament, but the later ships of the same class were completed with just one fixed tube on either broadside, designed for line of battle tactics.

Another new type which threatened to usurp the torpedo cruiser's role was the "torpedo-boat destroyer", soon simply known as the destroyer. The concept was influenced by the Spanish torpedo cruiser Destructor launched in 1886, but the subsequent British type pioneered in 1892 was smaller and faster, and was quickly adopted by all the great power navies of the 1890s.

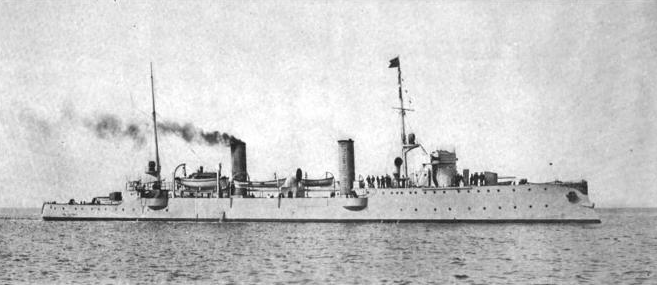
One of the two Peyk-i Şevket-class cruisers

However, ships of the German torpedokreuzer type continued to be built for a number of navies outside the great powers. The five vessels of the Swedish Örnen class, which were built in the late 1890s, continued in service for many decades. German shipyards also produced a number of torpedo cruisers for export to various foreign clients, with Krupp building three for the Brazilian Navy, one for the National Navy of Uruguay, and two for the Ottoman Navy Peyk-i Şevket class, which were completed in 1907.

One great power battlefleet which continued to utilize the torpedo cruiser was the Imperial Russian Navy. They had employed torpedo-armed warships since the 1870s, using "torpedo cutters" successfully against the Ottomans in the 1870s, and launched the large "torpedo vessel" Vzryv in 1877, but their first ship specifically designated as a torpedo cruiser was Leytenant Ilyin of 1886, followed by one sister ship in 1889, and in the 1890s by the six ships of the Kazarskiy class and the more heavily armed Abrek. These coexisted with conventional destroyers of the British type, and the onset of the Russo-Japanese War in 1904 prompted the construction of another twenty-four ships of the type - they were distinguished from contemporary destroyers by being slightly slower, but larger, more heavily-armed and more seaworthy. In order to accelerate production, most of them were built in collaboration with German shipyards, although the Leytenant Shestakov class were an entirely domestic design. All were similar in size and capabilities, typically with a speed of around 25 knots (46 km/h; 29 mph), three 457 mm (18.0 in) torpedo tubes, two 75 mm (3.0 in) guns, and four 57 mm (2.2 in) guns, and in a departure from the high-freeboard hullform of earlier torpedo cruisers, they were low-freeboard ships with a high forecastle: this style of hull had originated with late-nineteenth century cruisers, but was coming to be associated with destroyers (such as the British River class), and in 1907, as part of the review of naval thinking after the Battle of Tsushima, the Russians opted to reclassify all their torpedo cruisers as part of the destroyer fleet.

=== World War II ===
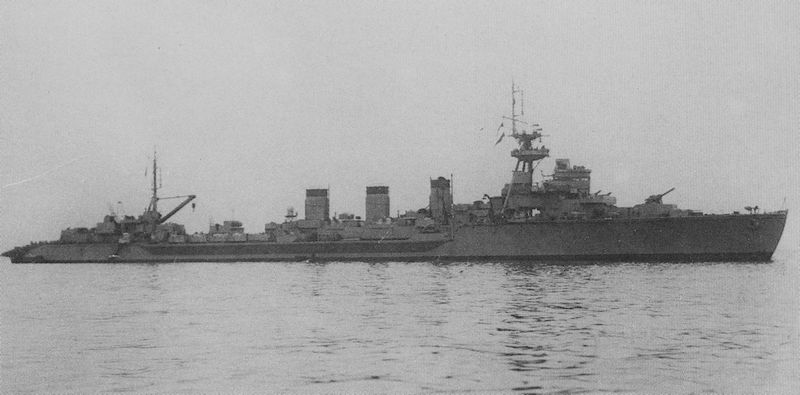
Kitakami on 20 January 1945 at Sasebo Naval Arsenal.

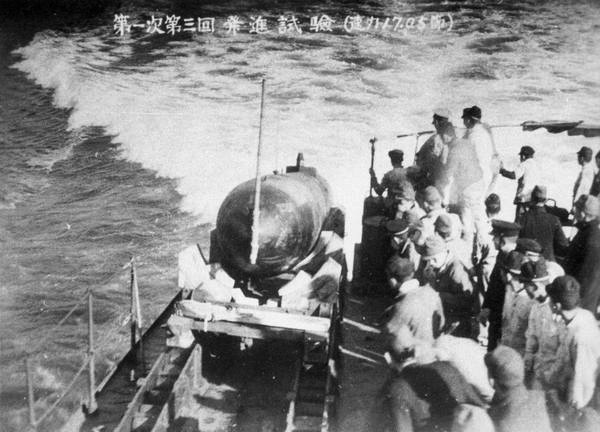
Kaiten Type 1 being first trial launched from Kitakami.

The Imperial Japanese Navy faced a numerical disadvantage against the United States Navy, and prior to the Pacific War, they formulated a strategy of attacking the American fleets through ambush tactics, with heavy reliance on torpedoes. This plan principally emphasized submarines, but with the development of the type 93 torpedo, there was a need for surface vessels that could accommodate such weapons. Three vessels of the Kuma class of light cruisers were appointed for renovation, namely Kitakami, Ōi and Kiso. Renovation of Ōi and Kitakami began in 1941, with large-scale expansion of the hull, enlargement of the bridge, and removal of main and secondary artillery armaments. 610 mm (24 in) quadruple torpedo tubes were mounted on the vessel, with 5 mounts and 20 bays on each side, adding to a total of 10 mounts and 40 bays. Kiso was planned for modification, however the renovations never took place. Kitakami and Ōi served only briefly in this new role, but were not used operationally before being converted into high speed troop transports in 1942, and with then Kitakami converted into a Kaiten (suicide torpedo) carrier in the later stages of the war.

== See also ==
- Torpedo gunboat
- List of torpedo cruisers of Italy
