= List of ship launches in 1882 =

The list of ship launches in 1882 includes a chronological list of some ships launched in 1882.

Date	Ship	Class / type	Builder	Location	Country	Notes
1 January	Cumbria	Steam yacht	Messrs. C. Mitchell & Co.	Newcastle upon Tyne	United Kingdom	For Earl of Lonsdale.
1 January	Inchibora	Steamship	Messrs. C. Mitchell & Co.	Newcastle upon Tyne	United Kingdom	For Messrs. Harrison, Fraser & Co.
4 January	Inversnaid	East Indiaman	Messrs. Robert Steele & Co.	Greenock	United Kingdom	For Messrs. John McGregor & Son.
5 January	Sunrise	Steamship	Messrs. Richardson, Duck & Co.	South Stockton	United Kingdom	For Messrs. Cammell, Woolf, and Haigh.
7 January	Garfield	Sailing ship	Harland & Wolff	Belfast	United Kingdom	For North Western Shipping Co, or White Star Line.
7 January	Wicklow	Steamship	Messrs. Robert Steele & Co.	Greenock	United Kingdom	For Clyde Shipping Company.
9 January	James A. Garfield	Steamship	Messrs. William Hamilton & Co.	Port Glasgow	United Kingdom	For President Line.
10 January	Ville de Pernambuco	Steamship	Forges et Chantiers de la Méditerranée	La Seyne	France	For Compagnie Maritime des Chargeurs Réunis.
15 January	John Readhead	Steamship	Messrs. John Readhead & Co.	South Shields	United Kingdom	For Messrs. Franz Rahtkens, Olsen & Co.
16 January	Bandeeth	Barque	Messrs. Russell & Co.	Port Glasgow	United Kingdom	For Messrs. W. & J. Lockett.
18 January	Garvel	Lightship	Messrs. Blackwood & Gordon	Port Glasgow	United Kingdom	For Clyde Light Trust.
18 January	Saltholmen	Steamship	Motala Verkstad	Lindholmens	Sweden	For Det Forenede Dampskib Selskab.
19 January	Bengeo	Steamship	Whitehaven Shipbuilding Company	Whitehaven	United Kingdom	For Joseph Hoult.
19 January	Cloncaird	Barque	Messrs. John Reid & Co.	Port Glasgow	United Kingdom	For Messrs. John Kerr & Co.
19 January	Grassendale	Full-rigged ship	Messrs. Williamson & Son	Workington	United Kingdom	For private owner.
19 January	Kansas	Steamship	Messrs. Charles Connell & Co.	Scotstoun	United Kingdom	For Messrs. George Warren & Co.
19 January	Mastiff	Steamship	Messrs. R. Thompson & Sons	Southwick	United Kingdom	For Messrs. R. Thompson & Co.
19 January	Nymphæa	Steamship	Tyne Iron Shipbuilding Company (Limited)	Willington Quay	United Kingdom	For Messrs. Joseph Robinson & Co.
20 January	Asernoy	Steamship	Motala Verkstad	Norrköping	Sweden	For Imperial Russian Government.
20 January	Benhope	Steamship	Messrs. Caird & Purdie	Barrow-in-Furness	United Kingdom	For Joseph Hoult.
20 January	Congo	Steamship	Messrs. Cunliffe & Dunlop	Port Glasgow	United Kingdom	For British and African Steam Navigation Company.
21 January	Frankistan	Merchantman	Messrs. Oswald, Mordaunt & Co.	Southampton	United Kingdom	For British and Eastern Shipping Company.
21 January	Friary	Steamship	James Laing	Deptford	United Kingdom	For Messrs. Jones, Brothers & Co.
21 January	Ho-Nam	Paddle steamer	Messrs. A. & J. Inglis	Pointhouse	United Kingdom	For Hong Kong, Canton & Macao Steamboat Company.
21 January	Macalister	Steamship	Messrs. Blackwood & Gordon	Port Glasgow	United Kingdom	For Messrs. E. M'Allister & Co.
21 January	Matthew Bedlington	Steamship	Whitehall Shipbuilding Company	Whitby	United Kingdom	For Messrs. T. Turnbull & Co.
21 January	Pollie Whittaker	Schooner	Paul Rodgers	Carrickfergus	United Kingdom	For Wyre Shipping Company.
21 January	Rover	Steam yacht	Messrs. Ramage & Ferguson	Leith	United Kingdom	For Earl of Eglinton.
21 January	Stirling Castle	Steamship	Messrs John Elder & Co.	Fairfield	United Kingdom	For Messrs. Thomas Skinner & Co.
23 January	Pioneer	Fishing boat	James Duncan	Kingston-on-Spey	United Kingdom	For John Murray.
24 January	Hawarden	Steamship	Messrs. W. Gray & Co.	West Hartlepool	United Kingdom	For T. S. Hudson.
24 January	Mylomene	Merchantman	Messrs. W. H. Potter & Sons	Liverpool	United Kingdom	For Messrs. Henry Fernie & Sons.
25 January	Orialla	Merchantman	Messrs. Thomas Royden & Sons	Liverpool	United Kingdom	For Messrs. Sandbach, Parker & Co.
26 January	Murmansky	Steamship	Messrs. William Chrichton & Co	Åbo	(Russian Empire) Grand Duchy of Finland	For private owner.
28 January	Drachenfels	Steamship	Sunderland Shipbuilding Company, Limited	Sunderland	United Kingdom	For Deutsche Dampfschiffahrts-Gesellschaft Hansa.
29 January	Birmania	Steamship	Messrs. Orlando Bros.	Livorno	Italy	For Messrs. Rubatino & Co.
31 January	City of Bristol	Steamship	Messrs. Edward Withy & Co.	Middleton	United Kingdom	For Messrs. Palgrave, Murphy & Co.
31 January	Hecuba	Steamship	Messrs. Scott & Co.	Greenock	United Kingdom	For Messrs. Alfred Holt & Co.
31 January	Lolland	Steamship	Messrs. H. M'Intyre & Co.	Merksworth	United Kingdom	For Det Lollandske-Engelske Dampskibsselskad.
31 January	Oslo	Steamship	Kockums Mekaniska Werskslads Aktie Bolag	Malmö	United Kingdom	For Kristiania Dampskibskelskab.
January	Benisaf	Steamship	Schlesinger, Davis & Co.	Wallsend	United Kingdom	For Jules Mesnier.
January	Dan	Steamship	Messrs. Lobnitz & Co.	Renfrew	United Kingdom	For private owner.
1 February	Norodom	Steamship	Messrs. Scott & Co.	Cartsdyke	United Kingdom	For Messageries Fluvials de Cochinchine.
1 February	Paolo	Steamship	S. P. Austin & Son	Sunderland	United Kingdom	For A. C. de Freitas & Co.
2 February	Birksgate	Steamship	Messrs. David & William Henderson & Co.	Partick	United Kingdom	For Messrs. William Simpson & Co.
2 February	Joseph Arbib	Steamship	Messrs. Raylton Dixon & Co.	Middlesbrough	United Kingdom	For Messrs. J. Arbib & Co.
2 February	Mary E. Wadham	Steamship	Messrs. M'Ilwaine & Lewis	Belfast	United Kingdom	For Messrs. George Bargate & Co.
2 February	Socrates	Steamship	Messrs. C. S. Swan & Hunter	Wallsend	United Kingdom	For private owner.
4 February	British Prince	Passenger ship	Harland & Wolff	Belfast	United Kingdom	For British Shipowners Ltd.
4 February	Ealing	Steamship	Messrs. Hodgson & Soulsby	Blyth	United Kingdom	For Messrs. Watts, Ward & Co.
4 February	Elvira	Barque	Messrs. Alexander Hall & Co.	Aberdeen	United Kingdom	For Henry F. Watt.
4 February	Esk	Fishing smack	Whitby and Robin Hood's Bay Shipbuilding and Graving Dock Company	Whitby	United Kingdom	For private owner.
4 February	Inflexible	Steamship	Short Bros.	Sunderland	United Kingdom	For Messrs. Anderson, Horan & Co.
4 February	Salerno	Steamship	Osbourne, Graham & Co.	Sunderland	United Kingdom	For R. W. Jones & Co.
4 February	Treneglos	Steamship	John Readhead & Sons	South Shields	United Kingdom	For Edward Hain and Son.
5 February	Dupuy de Lûme	Steamship	Forges et Chantiers de la Méditerranée	Le Havre	France	For Compagnie Commerciale de Transports à Vapeur Français.
6 February	Boston City	Steamship	Messrs. William Gray & Co.	West Hartlepool	United Kingdom	For Messrs. Thomas Furness & Co.
6 February	Coban	Collier	William Doxford & Sons	Sunderland	United Kingdom	For Black Diamond Steamship Co. of Montreal Ltd.
6 February	Haidar-Pasha	Steamship	Messrs. Samuda Bros.	Cubitt Town	United Kingdom	For W. J. Alt.
6 February	Lady Longden	Steamship	Messrs. Forrestt & Sons	Millwall	United Kingdom	For T. A. Tambayah.
6 February	Pelican	Steamship	Messrs. Barclay, Curle & Co.	Whiteinch	United Kingdom	For Messrs. Slater, White & Co.
7 February	Alora	Steamship	Messrs. Henry Murray	Port Glasgow	United Kingdom	For Messrs. Goodyear & Co.
7 February	Glenogle	Steamship	London & Glasgow Shipbuilding & Engineering Company	Glasgow	United Kingdom	For Messrs. M'Gregor, Gow & Co, the Glen Line.
7 February	Hesperia	Steamship	Barrow Ship Building Co. Ltd.	Barrow-in-Furness	United Kingdom	For Barrow Steam Ship Co Ltd.
9 February	Eastward	Steam fishing cutter	Earle's Shipbuilding and Engineering Company (Limited)	Hull	United Kingdom	For Great Northern Steamship Fishing Company (Limited).
16 February	Dodona	Steamship	Joseph L. Thompson & Sons	Sunderland	United Kingdom	For Thomas E. Hick and partners.
16 February	Henry Swayne	Barque	Messrs. Russell & Co.	Port Glasgow	United Kingdom	For Messrs. W. & J. Lockett.
16 February	Onoko	Lake freighter	Globe Iron Works Company	Cleveland, Ohio	United States	For Philip Minch.
18 February	C. S. Parnell	Schooner	Messrs. Stephen & Forbes	Peterhead	United Kingdom	For private owner.
18 February	Dordogne	Steamship	Messrs. C. S. Swan & Hunter	Wallsend	United Kingdom	For Cardiff Steam Shipping Company.
18 February	Howards	Steamship	Robert Thompson & Sons	Southwick	United Kingdom	For J. F. Marshall.
18 February	Pensher	Steamship	Short Bros.	Sunderland	United Kingdom	For J. S. Barwick.
18 February	Sherbro	Steamship	Messrs. John Elder & Co.	Fairfield	United Kingdom	For British and African Steam Navigation Company.
18 February	Vendòme	Steamship	D. Baxter & Co.	Sunderland	United Kingdom	For Dansey & Robinson.
19 February	Mentmore	Steamship	Messrs. J. Key & Sons	Kinghorn	United Kingdom	For private owner.
20 February	Alexandra	Hopper dredger	Messrs. William Simons & Co.	Renfrew	United Kingdom	For Manchester, Sheffield and Lincolnshire Railway.
20 February	China	Steamship	Messrs. Palmer's	Newcastle upon Tyne	United Kingdom	For Messrs. R. Rubattino & Co.
20 February	Earl of Powis	Steamship	Messrs. Robert Duncan & Co.	Port Glasgow	United Kingdom	For Shropshire Union Railways and Canal Company.
20 February	Falls of Afton	East Indiaman	Messrs. Russell & Co.	Cartsdyke	United Kingdom	For Messrs. Breckinridge & Co.
20 February	George Heaton	Steamship	Tyne Iron Shipbuilding Company (Limited)	Willington Quay-on-Tyne	United Kingdom	For Messrs. Charles Tully & Co.
20 February	Jeanie	Steamship	Messrs. Edward Withy & Co.	Middleton	United Kingdom	For Messrs. Coverdale, Todd & Co.
20 February	Marion Lee	Steamship	Whitehaven Shipbuilding Company	Whitehaven	United Kingdom	For Mr. Gambles.
20 February	Turquoise	Steamship	Richardson, Duck & Co.	South Stockton	United Kingdom	For C. O. Young & Christie.
21 February	Arracan	Steamship	Messrs. Robert Duncan & Co.	Port Glasgow	United Kingdom	For British & Burmese Steam Navigation Co.
21 February	Boskenna Bay	Steamship	Schlesinger Davis & Co.	Wallsend	United Kingdom	For Mount's Bay Steam Ship Company.
21 February	Casino	Steamship	Messrs. Gourlay Bros. & Company	Dundee	United Kingdom	For B. B. Nicoll.
21 February	Clan Macdonald	Steamship	Messrs. Scott & Co.	Cartsdyke	United Kingdom	For Clan Line.
21 February	Helen Nicoll	Steamship	Messrs. Gourlay Bros. & Co.	Dundee	United Kingdom	For B. B. Nicoll.
21 February	Recta	Steamship	Joseph L. Thompson & Sons	Sunderland	United Kingdom	For Gordon & Stamp.
21 February	Sweetheart	Steam yacht	Messrs. D. & W. Henderson	Partick	United Kingdom	For William Hutcheson.
22 February	Clan Buchanan	Steamship	Messrs. A. M'Millan & Son	Dumbarton	United Kingdom	For Clan Line.
22 February	Clan Cameron	Steamship	Messrs. Alexander Stephen & Sons	Linthouse	United Kingdom	For Clan Line.
22 February	Deer Hill	Steamship	Messrs. William Gray & Co.	West Hartlepool	United Kingdom	For Messrs. J. H. Murrell & Co.
22 February	Middlesbrough	Steamship	Messrs. Raylton Dixon & Co.	Middlesbrough	United Kingdom	For Messrs. Hogg & Henderson.
22 February	Prins Frederick	Steamship	Messrs. John Elder & Co.	Govan	United Kingdom	For Stoomvaart Maatschappij Nederland.
22 February	Sebenico	Zara-class cruiser	Pola Naval Arsenal	Pola	Austria-Hungary	For Austro-Hungarian Navy.
February	Excellensen Posse	Steamship	Oskarshamn Engineering Works	Oskarshamn	Sweden	For "Steam Navigation Company Kontinenten".
February	Glenshee	Barque	Messrs. Alexander Stephen & Sons	Dundee	United Kingdom	For Messrs. W. O. Taylor & Co.
February	Geok-Tepé	Warship		location	Russia	For Imperial Russian Navy.
February	Scobeleff	Warship		Caspian Sea	Russia	For Imperial Russian Navy.
February	Vera	Steamship	Campbeltown Shipbuilding Company	Campbeltown	United Kingdom	For Messrs. Rodoeanachi, Sons, & Co.
4 March	Aviemore	Steamship	W. B. Thompson	Dundee	United Kingdom	For private owner.
4 March	Highgate	Steamship	Messrs. Turnbull & Sons	Whitby	United Kingdom	For Messrs. Turnbull, Scott & Co.
4 March	Mareca	Steamship	Palmer's Shipbuilding and Iron Company (Limited)	Jarrow	United Kingdom	For Messrs. Porteous & Senior.
6 March	Langdon	Steamship	Messrs. John Readhead & Co.	Southj Shields	United Kingdom	For Messrs. John Fenwick & Son.
7 March	Benacre	Steamship	Messrs. Caird & Purdie	Barrow-in-Furness	United Kingdom	For Joseph Holt. Holed on being launched and sank.
7 March	Ehrenfels	Steamship	Messrs. Wigham, Richardson & Co.	Low Walker	United Kingdom	For Deutsche Dampfschiffs-Gesellschaft Hansa.
7 March	Glanwern	Steamship	William Doxford & Sons	Sunderland	United Kingdom	For J. Francis, or Messrs. John Francis & Thomas H. Jones.
7 March	Goorkha	Steamship	Messrs. William Denny & Brothers	Dumbarton	United Kingdom	For British India Steam Navigation Company.
7 March	Hildegarde	Steamship	Palmer's Shipbuilding and Iron Company (Limited)	Howden	United Kingdom	For Hildegarde Steamship Company (Limited), or Messr. J. & R. Bovey.
7 March	Mercurius	Tanker	Motala Verkstad	Lindholmens	Sweden	For Mr. Merkulljeff.
7 March	Monkstown	Paddle steamer	Messrs. MacIlwain & Lewis	Belfast	United Kingdom	For Cork, Blackrock and Passage Railway.
7 March	The Squirrel	Ketch	Mr. Carver	Bridgwater	United Kingdom	For James Ware.
7 March	Windsor Park	Merchantman	Messrs. T. Royden & Sons	Liverpool	United Kingdom	For A. Howden & Co.
8 March	Gidion	Steamship	Messrs. M'Intyre	Paisley	United Kingdom	For Messrs Pile & Co.
8 March	Australia	Steam fishing cutter	Earle's Shipbuilding and Engineering Company	Hull	United Kingdom	For Hull Steam Fishing and Ice Company (Limited).
11 March	Lymington	Steamship	Messrs. Edwards & Symes	Cubitt Town	United Kingdom	For Messrs. Pile & Co.
11 March	Valencia	Steamship	William Cramp & Sons	Philadelphia, Pennsylvania	United States	For Red D Line.
17 March	Ingerid	Steamship	Messrs. H. Murray & Co.	Port Glasgow	United Kingdom	For Messrs. D. Burgher & Son.
18 March	Abergeldie	Steamship	Sunderland Shipbuilding Company, Limited	Sunderland	United Kingdom	For Adam Bros. & Co.
18 March	Ashton	Steamship	Messrs. E. Withy & Co.	Middleton	United Kingdom	For William Lamplough, or Williamson Lamplough.
18 March	Castlehill	Steamship	Messrs. Hodgson & Soulsby	Blyth	United Kingdom	For Messrs. Thomlinson, Thomson & Co.
18 March	Edinburgh	Colossus-class battleship	Pembroke Dockyard	Pembroke	United Kingdom	For Royal Navy. Ran aground on being launched and was severely damaged.
18 March	Engineer	Steamship	Messrs. Aitken & Mansel	Whiteinch	United Kingdom	For Messrs. John & James Thomson, or Messrs. Thomas & James Harrison.
18 March	Longueil	Steamship	William Pickersgill & Sons	Sunderland	United Kingdom	For Morel Bros.
18 March	Mandingo	Steamship	Harland & Wolff	Belfast	United Kingdom	For African Steamship Co.
18 March	Maulkins Tower'	Steamship	John Blumer & Co.	Sunderland	United Kingdom	For Stumore, Weston & Co.
18 March	Plutos	Steamship	T. E. Smith	North Shields	United Kingdom	For Messrs Thomas Kish & Co.
18 March	Rhosina	Steamship	James Laing	Sunderland	United Kingdom	For Atlantic Line.
18 March	Straits of Dover	Steamship	Robert Thompson & Sons	Sunderland	United Kingdom	For N. McLean & Co, or Messrs. Neil McLean and partners.
18 March	Yeoman	Steamship	Messrs. Campbell, Mackintosh, & Bowstead	Scotswood	United Kingdom	For W. Lund.
19 March	Parana	Steamship	Forges et Chantiers de la Méditerranée	Le HAvre	France	For Chargeurs Réunis.
20 March	Amphitrite	Merchantman	Messrs. Robert Duncan & Co.	Port Glasgow	United Kingdom	For Colin S. Caird.
20 March	New Resolute	Passenger ship	Messrs. Scoble & Davies	Falmouth	United Kingdom	For Messrs. Benny & Co.
20 March	Venitienne	Steamship	Penarth Shipbuilding and Shiprepairing Company (Limited)	Penarth	United Kingdom	For Messrs. Cuthbert, Hancock & Co.
21 March	Clan Graham	Steamship	Messrs. Napier, Shanks & Bell	Yoker	United Kingdom	For Clan Line.
21 March	Colossus	Colossus-class battleship	Portsmouth Dockyard	Portsmouth	United Kingdom	For Royal Navy
21 March	East Anglian	Steamship	Messrs. John Fullarton & Co.	Merksworth	United Kingdom	For East Coast Steamship Company (Limited).
21 March	Guildford	Steamship	Palmer's Shipbuilding and Iron Company	Jarrow	United Kingdom	For Messrs. J. Temperley & Son.
21 March	Hanoverian	Steamship	William Doxford & Sons	Sunderland	United Kingdom	For J. & A. Allen.
21 March	Posang	Steamship	London and Glasgow Shipbuilding Company	Glasgow	United Kingdom	For Messrs. Jardine, Mathieson & Co.
22 March	Durham City	Steamship	Messrs. William Gray & Co.	West Hartlepool	United Kingdom	For Messrs. Thomas Furness & Co.
22 March	Empress	Steamship	Short Bros.	Sunderland	United Kingdom	For Taylor & Sanderson Steam Shipping Co.
23 March	Muncaster Castle	Merchantman	Messrs. W. H. Potter & Co.	Liverpool	United Kingdom	For Lancaster Shipowners Company.
24 March	Abana	Steamship	Messrs. M. Pearse & Co.	Stockton-on-Tees	United Kingdom	For private owner.
24 March	Juno	Steamship	Earle's Engineering and Shipbuilding Company	Hull	United Kingdom	For Wilson Line.
24 March	Lamport	Steamship	Messrs. C. S. Swan & Hunter	Wallsend-on-Tyne	United Kingdom	For Messrs. Arthur Holland & Co.
25 March	Ganges	Barque	Osbourne, Graham & Co Ltd	Sunderland	United Kingdom	For Nourse Line.
25 March	Leicester Castle	Steamship	Messrs. Oswald, Mordaunt & Co.	Southampton	United Kingdom	For John Coupland.
29 March	Earl of Dumfries	Paddle tug	Messrs. Elliot & Jeffrey	Cardiff	United Kingdom	For private owner.
1 April	Sarah	Steamship	Messrs. J. Readhead & Sons	South Shields	United Kingdom	For Messrs. R. Harrowing & Co. Also reported as 4 May.
3 April	Heimdal	Steamship	Messrs. Dobie & Co.	Govan	United Kingdom	For Messrs. Henderson & Co., or Dampskibs Selskabet "Freja".
3 April	Werneth Hall	Steamship	Messrs. Charles Connell & Co.	Scotstoun	United Kingdom	For Messrs. Alexander & Radcliffe.
4 April	Essex	Steamship	Messrs. Raylton Dixon & Co.	Middlesbrough	United Kingdom	For Messrs. Money, Wigram & (Limited).
4 April	Mudela	Steamship	Messrs. Alexander Stephens & Sons	Linthouse	United Kingdom	For Señor Martinez de les Rivas.
5 April	Beechville	Steamship	Messrs. William Gray & Co.	West Hartlepool	United Kingdom	For Messrs. R. Shadford & Co.
5 April	Corinna	Steamship	Messrs. David & William Henderson & Co.	Partick	United Kingdom	For Tasmanian Steam Navigation Company.
5 April	Invicta	Paddle steamer	Thames Ironworks and Shipbuilding Company	Leamouth	United Kingdom	For London, Chatham and Dover Railway.
5 April	Memeline III	Steam fishing vessel	Messrs. D. Allan & Co	Granton	United Kingdom	For Messrs. Mercader & Sons.
5 April	Port Glasgow	Barque	Messrs. Russell & Co	Port Glasgow	United Kingdom	For Messrs. Crawford & Rowat.
5 April	Tagliafero	Steamship	Messrs. Schlesinger, Davis & Co.	Wallsend	United Kingdom	For Trading Steam Ship Company (Limited).
6 April	Gitana	Steam yacht	Messrs. Ramage & Ferguson	Leith	United Kingdom	For Henry Jameson.
6 April	Glanworth	Steamship	Messrs. John Key & Sons	Kirkcaldy	United Kingdom	For Australian Steam Navigation Company.
6 April	Tana	Steamship	S. P. Austin & Son	Sunderland	United Kingdom	For Christian Salvesen & Co.
13 April	Robert Wallace	Bulk carrier	William H. Radcliffe	Cleveland, Ohio	United States	For David Wallace.
15 April	Flora	Steamship	Earle's Shipbuilding Company	Hull	United Kingdom	For William Bailey.
15 April	Basilic	Wheeled aviso	Chantiers et Ateliers Augustin Normand	Le Havre	France	For French Navy
15 April	Kong Ring	Steamship	Kockums Engineering Works	Malmö	Sweden	For Söndefjeldske-Norske Damskibskelskab.
17 April	Almirante Barroso	Cruiser	Arsenal de Marinha do Rio de Janeiro	Rio de Janeiro	Brazil	For Imperial Brazilian Navy.
17 April	Everilda	Steamship	Messrs. Turnbull & Son	Whitby	United Kingdom	For Messrs. Turnbull Bros.
17 April	Katherine Clark	Steamship	Messrs. Robert Duncan & Co.	Port Glasgow	United Kingdom	For Messrs. James Little & Co.
18 April	Wendouree	Collier	S. & H. Morton & Co.	Leith	United Kingdom	For Huddard Parker & Co. Pty. Ltd.
19 April	Dora Tully	Steamship	Tyne Iron Shipbuilding Company	Newcastle upon Tyne	United Kingdom	For Messrs. Charles Tully & Co.
19 April	Falls of Dee	Full-rigged ship	Messrs. Russell & Co.	Greenock	United Kingdom	For Messrs. Wright & Breakenridge.
19 April	Firefly	Steamship	Messrs. T. B. Seath & Co.	Rutherglen	United Kingdom	For Messrs. James Ewing & Co.
19 April	Maipo	Steamship	Messrs. John Reid & Co.	Port Glasgow	United Kingdom	For Campania Sud Americana de Vapores.
19 April	Remembrance	Steamship	Short Bros.	Sunderland	United Kingdom	For T. Freear.
19 April	Rewa	Steamship	Messrs. A. & J. Inglis	Pointhouse	United Kingdom	For British India Association.
19 April	Rougemont	Steamship	Messrs. Edward Finch & Co. (Limited)	Chepstow	United Kingdom	For Messrs. John Cory & Sons.
19 April	Starling	Banterer-class gunboat	Samuda Brothers	Poplar	United Kingdom	For Royal Navy.
19 April	Thor	Steamship	Messrs. M. Pearse & Co.	Stockton-on-Tees	United Kingdom	For Richard J. Kay.
20 April	Clan Mackenzie	Steamship	Messrs. Ramage & Ferguson	Leith	United Kingdom	For Clan Line.
20 April	Duke of Westminster	Steamship	Barrow Ship Building Co. Ltd.	Barrow-in-Furness	United Kingdom	For Eastern Steam Ship Co. Ltd., or Ducal Line.
20 April	Omapere	Steamship	Messrs. William Denny & Bros.	Dumbarton	United Kingdom	For Union Steamship Company of New Zealand.
20 April	R. P. Rithet	Sternwheeler	Alexander Watson	Victoria	Canada	For John Irving.
21 April	Arendahl	Steamship	Motala Verkstad	Lindholmens	Sweden	For Arendahls Dampskib Skelskab.
21 April	Tibor	Steamship	Messrs. William Burrell & Son	Dumbarton	United Kingdom	For Adria-Hungarian Steam Navigation Company.
22 April	Bonnie Princess	Paddle steamer	Messrs. T. B. Seath & Co.	Rutherglen	United Kingdom	For Liverpool, Llandudno and Welsh Coast Steamboat Company (Limited).
22 April	Clapet I	Hopper barge	Messrs. Lobnitz & Co.	Renfrew	United Kingdom	For Panama Canal Company.
22 April	La Capital	Steamship	Messrs. Edwards & Symes	Cubitt Town	United Kingdom	For Argentine Government.
22 April	Nutford	Steamship	Joseph L. Thompson & Sons	Sunderland	United Kingdom	For Thompson, Wrightson & Co.
22 April	Patria	Steamship	Messrs. Murdoch & Murray	Port Glasgow	United Kingdom	For "Wasa North Sea Steam Navigation Company".
26 April	Stern	Steamship	Flensburger Schiffbau-Gesellschaft	Flensburg	Germany	For Messrs. Holm & Molzen.
27 April	Foudroyant	Dévastation-class ironclad		Toulon	France	For French Navy.
27 April	Wardleys	Tug	Messrs. Murdoch & Murray	Port Glasgow	United Kingdom	For Messrs. Hebron & Ramsden, or Lancashire and Yorkshire Railway.
29 April	Lord Downshire	Barque	Harland & Wolff	Belfast	United Kingdom	For Thomas Dixon & Sons.
April	Chaloupe I	Hopper barge	Messrs. Lobnitz & Co.	Renfrew	United Kingdom	For Panama Canal Company.
April	Intrepid	Ketch	C. Burt & Sons	Falmouth	United Kingdom	For Charles Domallie.
April	Kasi	Paddle tug	Messrs. D. J. Dunlop & Co.	Port Glasgow	United Kingdom	For Oude and Rohilkund Railway.
April	Mitford	Steamship	Messrs. J. L. Thompson & Sons	Sunderland	United Kingdom	For Standard Steamship Company.
1 May	Henry James	Barque	Messrs. Dobie & Co.	Govan	United Kingdom	For North British Shipping Company.
1 May	Insulinde	Steamship	Messrs. John Elder & Co.	Fairfield	United Kingdom	For Stoomvaart Maatschappij Nederland.
1 May	Napthlion	Steamship	Messrs. H. M'Intyre & Co.	Merksworth	United Kingdom	For D. P. Gudi.
1 May	Scaramanga	Steamship	Messrs. C. S. Swan & Hunter	Wallsend-on-Tyne	United Kingdom	For Messrs. Scaramanga & Co.
2 May	Beny	Steamship		Whitehaven	United Kingdom	For J. Hoult.
2 May	Dabulamanzi	Steamship	Messrs. Hall, Russell & Co.	Aberdeen	United Kingdom	For Messrs. J. T. Rennie & Sons.
2 May	Dandelion	Cutter	Messrs. Camper & Nicholson	Gosport	United Kingdom	For R. H. Baillie.
3 May	Kenmore	Barque	Messrs. John Reid & Co.	Port Glasgow	United Kingdom	For R. B. Finlay, or Messrs. Campbell, Finlay & Co.
3 May	Marsala	Steamship	Messrs. Alexander Stephen & Sons	Linthouse	United Kingdom	For Messrs. Robert M. Sloman & Co.
3 May	Roehampton	Steamship	Messrs. Edward Withy & Co.	Middleton	United Kingdom	For Messrs. Steel, Young & Co.
3 May	Welbury	Steamship	Messrs. William Gray & Co.	West Hartlepool	United Kingdom	For Messrs. Joseph Merryweather & Co.
3 May	Zaandam	Passenger ship	Fijenoord	Schiedam	Netherlands	For Nederlandsch-Amerikaansche Stoomvaartmaatschappij.
4 May	Glendower	Steamship	Messrs. Palmer's Shipbuilding and Iron Company	Howden	United Kingdom	For Messrs. Lindsay Gracie & Co.
4 May	Mallard	Steamship	Messrs. Gourlay Brothers & Co.	Dundee	United Kingdom	For General Steam Navigation Company.
4 May	Skuzzy	Sternwheeler	Andrew Onderdonk	Spuzzum	Canada	For Andrew Onderdonk.
4 May	Snark	Steam yacht	Messrs. William Denny & Brothers	Dumbarton	United Kingdom	For Messrs. William Denny & Brothers.
5 May	Cuxhaven	Steamship	William Thompson	Dundee	United Kingdom	For Yorkshire Coal & Steamship Co.
5 May	Gaviota	Steam yacht	Messrs. John Fullarton & Sons	Merksworth	United Kingdom	For Don Thomas de Heridia.
5 May	River Forth	Steamship	Messrs. Workman, Clark & Co.	Belfast	United Kingdom	For James Little & Co.
5 May	Unnamed	Steamship	Messrs. William Swan & Co.	Kelvindock	United Kingdom	For Messrs. Morris, Munro & Co.
6 May	Etta	Steamship	William Gray & Co.	West Hartlepool	United Kingdom	For Messrs. Thomas Appleby & Co.
6 May	Grecian Monarch	Steamship	Messrs. Earle's Shipbuilding and Engineering Company (Limited)	Hull	United Kingdom	For Royal Exchange Shipping Company.
6 May	Justicia	Steamship	Barrow Ship Building Co. Ltd.	Barrow-in-Furness	United Kingdom	For Barrow Steamship Co., or Anchor Line.
6 May	Morning Star	Steamship	Messrs. Irvine & Co.	West Hartlepool	United Kingdom	For Messrs. Johnson Bros. & Co.
6 May	Norrtelje	Steamship	Lindberg Works	Stockholm	Sweden	For Roslagen Company.
6 May	Stratheden	Steamship	Messrs. Henry Murray & Co.	Dumbarton	United Kingdom	For Messrs. James Hay & Sons.
6 May	Venetian	Steamship	Messrs. Palmer & Co.	Jarrow	United Kingdom	For Messrs. Frederick Leyland & Co.
6 May	Woolston	Steamship	Messrs. Oswald, Mordaunt & Co.	Southampton	United Kingdom	For private owner.
9 May	Charlotte Kilner	Ketch	George Outwin	Goole	United Kingdom	For private owner.
16 May	Cambodia	Steamship	Robert Thompson & Sons	Sunderland	United Kingdom	For Crow, Bogart & Rudolf.
16 May	Mona's Isle	Paddle steamer	Caird & Co.	Greenock	United Kingdom	For Isle of Man Steam Packet Company.
17 May	Boadicea	Steam yacht	Mesrs John Elder & Co.	Govan	United Kingdom	For William Pearce.
17 May	Inverarnan	Merchantman	Messrs. Barclay, Curle & Co.	Whiteinch	United Kingdom	For Messrs. J. Macgregor & Son.
17 May	Ischia	Steamship	Messrs. David & William Henderson & Co.	Partick	United Kingdom	For Anchor Line.
17 May	Wairarapa	Steamship	Messrs. William Denny & Bros.	Dumbarton	United Kingdom	For Union Steamship Company of New Zealand (Limited).
17 May	Warwick	Steamship	Wigham, Richardson & Co.	Newcastle upon Tyne	United Kingdom	For Great Western Steamship Company.
18 May	Jumbo	Paddle steamer	Robert J. Blyth	Southtown	United Kingdom	For Robert J. Blyth.
18 May	Lenore	Schooner	Messrs. Workman, Clark & Co.	Belfast	United Kingdom	For George Smith.
18 May	Raven	Banterer-class gunboat	Samuda Brothers	Poplar	United Kingdom	For Royal Navy.
18 May	Scrivia	Steamship	Messrs Raylton Dixon & Co.	Middlesbrough	United Kingdom	For Messrs. Raggio & Co.
18 May	Teviotdale	Steamship	Messrs. R. Steele & Co.	Greenock	United Kingdom	For Messrs. R. Mackill & Co.
18 May	Wild Rose	Tug	Messrs. Edward Find & Co. (Limited)	Chepstow	United Kingdom	For Messrs. D. Guy & Son.
19 May	Christabel	Yacht	Messrs. J. & J. Cooper	Pill	United Kingdom	For T. Culverwell.
19 May	Little Pet	Cutter	Mr. Robertson	Ipswich	United Kingdom	For Mr. Robertson.
19 May	Lucero	Steamship	Osbourne, Graham & Co	North Hylton	United Kingdom	For F. de Carranza.
19 May	Raven	Banterer-class gunboat	Samuda Brothers	Poplar	United Kingdom	For Royal Navy.
19 May	Stork	Banterer-class gunboat	Samuda Brothers	Poplar	United Kingdom	For Royal Navy.
20 May	Arisaig	Steamship	Messrs. Blackwood & Gordon	Greenock	United Kingdom	For Messrs. Bow, Maclachlan & Co., or Messrs. Gardiner & Co.
20 May	Cephalonia	Steamship	Messrs. Laird Bros.	Birkenhead	United Kingdom	For Cunard Steamship Company.
20 May	Gwenllian Thomas	Steamship	Palmer's Shipbuilding Company	Jarrow	United Kingdom	For E. Thomas.
20 May	Lilburn Tower	Steamship	William Doxford & Sons	Sunderland	United Kingdom	For Stumore, Weston & Co.
20 May	Nessmore	Steamship	Barrow Ship Building Co. Ltd.	Barrow-in-Furness	United Kingdom	For S.S. Nessmore Ltd.
20 May	Romania	Steamship	William Pickersgill & Sons	Sunderland	United Kingdom	For J. Russell, Son & Co.
20 May	Unnamed	Steamship	Messrs Edwards & Symes	Cubitt Town	United Kingdom	For Argentine Government.
22 May	Clan Drummond	Steamship	Messrs. A. M'Millan & Son	Dumbarton	United Kingdom	For Clan Line.
23 May	Fellus	Steamship	Motala Verkstad	Norrköping	Sweden	For Stockholms Angfartygs Rederi Bolag.
23 May	Sutherlandshire	Barque	Messrs. Russell & Co.	Greenock	United Kingdom	For Messrs. Thomas Law & Co.
24 May	Admiral Rooke	Steamship	Messrs. Raylton Dixon & Co.	Middlesbrough	United Kingdom	For Messrs. Smith, Imossi & Co.
24 May	Navarra	Steamship	Messrs. Henry Murray & Co.	Port Glasgow	United Kingdom	For Messrs. Henry Lamont & Co.
27 May	George Dittman	Steamship	Flensburger Schiffbau-Gesellschaft	Flensburg	Germany	For Flensburge Schiffbau-Gesellschaft.
27 May	Sardomene	Merchantman	Messrs. Oswald, Mordaunt & Co.	Woolston	United Kingdom	For Messrs. H. Fernie & Sons, or White Star Line.
27 May	Unnamed	Ferry	Messrs. Edwards & Symes	Cubitt Town	United Kingdom	For Argentine Government.
29 May	Chung King	Steamship	Messrs. Scott & Co	Cartsdyke	United Kingdom	For Messrs. John Swire & Sons.
29 May	Countess of Bredalbane	Steamship	Messrs. Hanna, Donald & Wilson	Paisley / Loch Awe	United Kingdom	For Loch Awe Steamboat Company.
30 May	Wans Fell	Steamship	Messrs. H. McIntyre & Co	Merksworth	United Kingdom	For Fell Line.
31 May	Atlas	Steamship	Messrs. Aitken & Mansel	Kelvinhaugh	United Kingdom	For Atlas Steamship Company.
31 May	Brittany	Paddle steamer	Messrs. John Elder & Co.	Govan	United Kingdom	For London, Brighton and South Coast Railway and Chemins de Fer de l'Ouest.
31 May	Firth of Clyde	Full-rigged ship	Dobie & Co.	Govan	United Kingdom	For Firth Line, or Messrs. James Spencer & Co.
May	Albano	Steamship	Messrs. Aitken & Mansel	Whiteinch	United Kingdom	For Atlas Steamship Company.
May	Clapet II	Hopper barge	Messrs. Lobnitz & Co.	Renfrew	United Kingdom	For Panama Canal Company.
May	Germaine	Yawl	Messrs. Camper & Nicholson	Gosport	United Kingdom	For Francis W. Popham.
May	Gertrude	Yawl	Alfred Payne & Sons	Northam	United Kingdom	For Colonel Sandeman.
May	Kadoc	Paddle steamer	Messrs. Seath & Co.	Rutherglen	United Kingdom	For Irrawaddy Flotilla Company.
May	Kara	Yacht		Wivenhoe	United Kingdom	For Henry Gore-Booth.
May	Lilly Heaps	Mersey Flat	John Brundrit	Runcorn	United Kingdom	For James Heaps.
May	Mayflower	Steamship	Messrs. William Swan & Co.	Maryhill	United Kingdom	For Messrs. James Ferguson & Sons.
May	Mersey	Coaster	W. Allsup & Sons	Preston	United Kingdom	For A Cook.
May	Schnetz	Torpedo boat	AG Weser	Bremen	Germany	For Kaiserliche Marine.
May	Silver Star	Cutter	Inman & Son	Lymington	United Kingdom	For M. B. Murray.
1 June	Carn Brea	Steamship	Tyne Iron Shipbuilding Company (Limited)	Willington Quay-on-Tyne	United Kingdom	For Edmund Handcock.
1 June	Ville de Para	Steamship	Messrs. Schlesinger, Davis & Co.	Wallsend	United Kingdom	For Société Postale Française de l'Atlantique.
2 June	Hypatia	Steamship	Messrs. Edward Withyt & Co	Middleton	United Kingdom	For T. Herskind.
2 June	Sokrates	Tanker	Motala Verkstad	Lindholmens	Sweden	For private owner.
3 June	B. Granger	Steamship	Messrs. Turnbull & Son	Whitby	United Kingdom	For Messrs. Robinson & Rowland.
3 June	Brooklands	Steamship	Messrs. William Gray & Co.	Hartlepool	United Kingdom	For Messrs. Hardy, Wilson & Co.
3 June	Caffila	Steamship	Bartram, Haswell & Co.	Sunderland	United Kingdom	For C. J. Hay & Co.
3 June	Flying Fish	Paddle tug	Messrs. Eltringham & Co.	South Shields	United Kingdom	For Mr. Siddall.
3 June	Nonpareil	Yawl	Messrs. Camper & Nicholson	Gosport	United Kingdom	For Major Hanmer.
3 June	Pavonia	Steamship	Messrs. J. & G. Thompson	Clydebank	United Kingdom	For Cunard Company (Limited).
3 June	Pembrokeshire	Steamship	London and Glasgow Shipbuilding Company	Govan	United Kingdom	For Messrs. Jenkins & Co.
3 June	Shamrock	Steamboat	London Steamboat Company	Battersea	United Kingdom	For London Steamboat Company.
3 June	Storra Lee	Steamship	Messrs. William Gray & Co.	West Hartlepool	United Kingdom	For Messrs. J. H. Murrell & Co.
3 June	Wilberforce	Steamship	Messrs. John Readhead & Sons	South Shields	United Kingdom	For Messrs. Robert Harrowing & Co.
3 June	Unnamed	Steamship	Messrs. C. S. Swan & Hunter	Wallsend	United Kingdom	For R. B. Avery.
5 June	Chandernagor	Steamship	William Denny & Bros.	location	United Kingdom	For Compagnie Nationale de Navigation.
5 June	Clan Campbell	Steamship	Messrs. Alexander Stephens & Sons	Kelvinside	United Kingdom	For Clan Line.
5 June	James Williamson	Schooner	Messrs. Nicholson & Marsh	Glasson Dock	United Kingdom	For Messrs. John Bradshaw & Co.
5 June	Kovno	Steamship	Messrs. Earle's	Hull	United Kingdom	For Messrs. Thomas Wilson, Sons & Co.
5 June	Loch Ness	Steamship	Messrs. John Elder & Co.	Fairfield	United Kingdom	For Dundee Loch Line Steamship Company.
6 June	A. M. Brundrit	Schooner	Brundrit & Co.	Runcorn	United Kingdom	For J. Brundrit & Co.
7 June	Albertina	Steamship	D. Baxter & Co.	Monkwearmouth	United Kingdom	For Messrs. Fisher, Renwick & Co. Ran into the quayside on being launched and was damaged.
7 June	River Lagan	Steamship	Messrs. Robert Duncan & Co.	Port Glasgow	United Kingdom	For Messrs. James Little & Co.
7 June	Van Speyk	Atjeh-class cruiser	Rijkswerf	Amsterdam	Netherlands	For Royal Netherlands Navy.
10 June	Volana	Steamship	Messrs. Charles Hill & Sons	Bristol	United Kingdom	For Messrs. Cuthbert, Hancock & Co.
12 June	Break of Day	Pilot cutter	Messrs. Davies & Plain	Cardiff	United Kingdom	For Thomas Jewitt.
13 June		Merchantman	Short Bros.	Pallion	United Kingdom	For
13 June	Horton	Steamship	builder	location	United Kingdom	For J. S. Barwick.
13 June	Zuruhan	Steamship	Messrs. William Crichton & Co.	Åbo	(Russian Empire) Grand Duchy of Finland	For private owner.
14 June	Nesta	Steamship	Messrs. R. & J. Evans & Co.	Liverpool	United Kingdom	For Messrs. Richards, Tweedy & Co.
15 June	Aberdeenshire	Barque	Messrs. Alexander Stephesn & Sons	Govan	United Kingdom	For Messrs. Thomas Law & Co.
15 June	Chigwell	Steamship	Robert Thompson & Sons	Sunderland	United Kingdom	For A. Suart.
15 June	City of Oxford	Steamship	Messrs. Barclay, Curle & Co.	Whiteinch	United Kingdom	For City Line.
15 June	Elfrida	Steam yacht	Messrs. Ramage & Ferguson	Leith	United Kingdom	For W. F. Burnley.
15 June	General Miles	Schooner			United States	For Ilwaco Steam Navigation Company.
15 June	Mary Beatrice	Paddle steamer	Messrs. Samuda Brothers	Poplar	United Kingdom	For South Eastern Railway.
15 June	Yucatan	Cargo ship	Harland & Wolff	Belfast	United Kingdom	For West India Shipping Co., or West India & Pacific Steamship Company.
17 June	Altnacraig	Steamship	Sunderland Shipbuilding Company, Limited	Sunderland	United Kingdom	For Adam Bros. & Co.
17 June	Ascalon	Steamship	Messrs. Campbell, Macintosh & Bowstead	Scotswood	United Kingdom	For Messrs. W. Milburn & Co.
17 June	Bombay	Steamship	Messrs. C. Mitchell & Co.	Low Walker	United Kingdom	For Messrs. Nelson, Donkin & Co.
17 June	Countess Evelyne	Steamship	Messrs. S. Caird & Purdie	Barrow-in-Furness	United Kingdom	For Mr. Ware.
17 June	Dynomeme	Merchantman	Messrs. W. H. Potter & Sons	Liverpool	United Kingdom	For Messrs. Henry Furnie & Sons.
17 June	Moel-y-Don	Barque	William Doxford & Sons	Sunderland	United Kingdom	For Gwynedd Shipping Co.
17 June	Raffaele Rubattino	Steamship	Palmer Shipbuilding and Iron Company	Jarrow	United Kingdom	For Messrs. R. Rubattino & Co.
17 June	Rockton	Steamship	Messrs. Napier, Shanks & Bell	Yoker	United Kingdom	For Australasia Steam Navigation Company.
17 June	St. Olaf	Steamship	Messrs. Murdoch & Murray	Port Glasgow	United Kingdom	For North of Scotland & Orkney & Shetland Steam Navigation Company.
17 June	The Saucy Arethusa	Steam yacht	Mr. Rawstron	Freckleton	United Kingdom	For John Leyland Birley.
19 June	General Elliott	Steamship	Messrs. Raylton Dixon & Co.	Middlesbrough	United Kingdom	For Messrs. Smith, Imossi & Co.
19 June	James Jackson	Steam trawler	Mr. Jackson	South Shields	United Kingdom	For Mr. Jackson.
19 June	Massalia	Steamship	Messrs. Scott & Co.	Cartsdyke	United Kingdom	For Messrs. Cyprien, Fabre et Cie.
19 June	Minard Castle	Steamship	Messrs. John Fullarton & Co.	Merksworth	United Kingdom	For Lochfyne & Glasgow Steam Packet Company.
19 June	Talavera	Merchantman	Messrs. Birrell, Stenhouse & Co.	Dumbarton	United Kingdom	For Messrs. John Hardie & Co., and others.
20 June	Antonio Munoz	Steamship	Messrs. R. Napier & Sons	Govban	United Kingdom	For Messrs. Ker, Bolton & Co.
20 June	Portugalete	Steamship	Palmers Shipbuilding and Iron Company (Limited)	Howden	United Kingdom	For Messrs. Morel Bros. & Co.
21 June	Sylvia	Steam yacht	Messrs. Alexander Stephen & Sons	Linthouse	United Kingdom	For Alexander Stephen.
22 June	Maracas	Merchantman	Messrs. M'Millan & Son	Greenock	United Kingdom	For Messrs. William Kenneth & Co.
22 June	Matterhorn	Merchantman	Messrs. Russell & Co.	Greenock	United Kingdom	For James R. De Wolff.
22 June	Sylvia	Steam yacht	Messrs. Alexander Stephen & Sons	Linthouse	United Kingdom	For private owner.
23 June	Clyde	Dredger	Messrs. W. Simons & Co.	Renfrew	United Kingdom	For Clyde Lighthouse Trust.
23 June	Orpheus	Steamship	Campbeltown Shipbuilding Company	Campbeltown	United Kingdom	For Messrs. Robert Gilchrist & Co.
24 June	Leander	Yacht	Messrs. Inman & Son	Leamington	United Kingdom	For W. B. Forwood.
26 June	Glucksberg	Steamship	Flensburger Schiffbau-Gesellschaft	Flensburg	Germany	For Globus Co.
27 June	Restormel	Steamship	Messrs. Palmer & Company (Limited)	Jarrow-on-Tyne	United Kingdom	For Messrs. John Cory & Sons.
29 June	Lutka	Steamship	Messrs. C. S. Swan & Hunter	Wallsend-on-Tyne	United Kingdom	For Mr. T. Rodenacker.
29 June	Mount Tabor	Steamship	James Laing	Sunderland	United Kingdom	For John Smith & Co.
29 June	Newent	Steamship	Short Bros.	Sunderland	United Kingdom	For James Westoll.
29 June	Normandy	Paddle steamer	Messrs. John Elder & Co.	Govan	United Kingdom	For London, Brighton and South Coast Railway and Chemins de fer de l'Ouest.
30 June	Crœsus	Steamship	Kish, Boolds & Co.	Pallion	United Kingdom	For T. Kish & Co, or Thomas Kish & partners
30 June	Hermes	Steamship	Messrs. Aitken & Mansel	Whiteinch	United Kingdom	For Messrs. R. P. Houston & Co.
30 June	Sarnia	Steamship	Messrs. Charles Connell & Co.	Scotstoun	United Kingdom	For Mississippi & Dominion Steamship Company (Limited).
30 June	Wuchang	Steamship	Messrs. Scott & Co.	Cartsdyke	United Kingdom	For Messrs. Swire & Sons.
June	Alesia	Ocean liner	Thomas Royden and Sons	Liverpool	United Kingdom	For Fabre Line.
June	San Juan	Ocean liner	Delaware River Iron Ship Building and Engine Works	Chester, Pennsylvania	United States	For Pacific Mail Steamship Company.
June	Sympathy	Humber Keel	George Brown	Hull	United Kingdom	For George Oldfield.
1 July	Burns	Steamship	Messrs. Edward Withy & Co	Middleton	United Kingdom	For Messrs. Glover Bros.
1 July	Cedric	Steamship	Messrs. Murdoch & Murray	Port Glasgow	United Kingdom	For Messrs. George Hood & Co.
1 July	Loch Bredan	Barque	Messrs. Dobie & Co.	Govan	United Kingdom	For James Sproat.
1 July	Myrtle	Steamship	William Pickersgill & Co.	Southwick	United Kingdom	For Hopper & Crosby.
1 July	St. Andrew's Bay	Steamship	Messrs. Andrew Leslie & Co.	Hebburn	United Kingdom	For Messrs. Affleck & Gray & Partners.
3 July	Cholon	Steamship	Messrs. A. & J. Inglis	Pointhouse	United Kingdom	For Compagnie Nationale de Navigation.
3 July	Earl of Dumfries	Steamship	S. P. Austin & Sopn	Sunderland	United Kingdom	For Martin & Marquand.
4 July	Cloch	Steamship	Messrs. W. Simons & Co.	Renfrew	United Kingdom	For Clyde Lighthouse Trust.
4 July	Poo-Chi	Steamship	Messrs. Aitken & Mansel	Whiteinch	United Kingdom	For China Merchants Steam Navigation Company.
4 July	Werra	Steamship	Messrs. John Elder & Co.	Fairfield	United Kingdom	For Norddeutsche Lloyd.
6 July	Walter H. Wilson	Barque	Harland & Wolff	Belfast	United Kingdom	For Samuel Lawther & Co.
4 July	Bolan	Merchantman	Messrs. Oswald, Mordaunt & Co.	Southampton	United Kingdom	For Messrs. T. & J. Brocklebank.
4 July	Oranmore	Steamship	Barrow Ship Building Co. Ltd.	Barrow-in-Furness	United Kingdom	For S.S. Oranmore Ltd.
5 July	Milo	Steamship	Messrs. William Gray & Co.	West Hartlepool	United Kingdom	For Messrs. Leask & Clark.
6 July	Grodno	Steamship	Earle's Shipbuilding and Engineering Company (Limited)	Hull	United Kingdom	For Messrs. Thomas Wilson, Sons, & Co.
8 July	Moreby	Merchantman		Whitehaven	United Kingdom	For private owner.
12 July	Lonsdale	Paddle steamer	Messrs. Robert Steele & Co.	Greenock	United Kingdom	For James Deane.
15 July	Ancient Briton	Steamship	Tyne Iron Shipbuilding Company (Limited)	Newcastle upon Tyne	United Kingdom	For Messrs, Gibbs & Lee.
15 July	Cheribon	Ocean liner	William Denny & Brothers	Dumbarton	United Kingdom	For Compagnie Nationale de Navigation.
15 July	Lady of the Lake	Steamboat	Messrs. Anderson & Lyall	Govan / Acharn	United Kingdom	For private owner.
15 July	Stephen Grey	Paddle tug	Edward Wales	Hull	United Kingdom	For Thomas Grey.
15 July	Toledo	Steamship	Joseph L. Thompson & Sons	Sunderland	United Kingdom	For John Tully & Co.
17 July	Leven Vale	Steamship	Messrs. Raylton Dixon & Co.	Middlesbrough	United Kingdom	For J. M. Lennard.
17 July	Llandaff	Steamship	Messrs. Richardson, Duck & Co.	South Stockton	United Kingdom	For Messrs. Charles Hill & Sons.
17 July	Olympia	Steamship	Messrs. M. Pearse & Co.	Stockton-on-Tees	United Kingdom	For F. Hirsking.
17 July	Preston	Steamship	Messrs. William Gray & Co.	West Hartlepool	United Kingdom	For Messrs. R. Ropner & Co.
18 July	Donau	Steamship	Robert Thompson & Sons	Sunderland	United Kingdom	For A. C. Mohr & Son.
18 July	Leader	Steamship	Bartram, Haswell, & Co.	Sunderland	United Kingdom	For Durham Steam Shipping Company.
18 July	Mameluke	Steamship	Messrs. C. Mitchell & Son	Low Walker	United Kingdom	For Bedouin Steam Navigation Company.
18 July	Sailor Prince	Steamship	Messrs. Hodgso & Soulsby	Blyth	United Kingdom	For James Knott.
19 July	Hudson Bay	Merchantman	Messrs. Russell & Co.	Port Glasgow	United Kingdom	For Messrs. Hatfield, Cameron & Co.
19 July	Newhaven	Steamship	Messrs. Workman, Clark & Co. (Limited)	Belfast	United Kingdom	For Messrs. Richard Mackie & Co.
19 July	Umsimkulu	Steamship	Abercorn Shipbuilding Co.	Paisley	United Kingdom	For Messrs Pollok, Clazy & Co.
20 July	Spinoza	Tanker	Motala Verkstad	Lindholmens	Sweden	For private owner.
20 July	Westfalia	Steamship	Messrs. William Hamilton & Co.	Port Glasgow	United Kingdom	For Messrs. Walker, Donald & Co.
29 July	Alcinous	East Indiaman	Messrs. Barclay, Curle & Co.	Whiteinch	United Kingdom	For Messrs. A. & J. H. Carmichael & Co.
29 July	Bancan	Steamship	Palmers's Shipbuilding and Iron Company	Howdon	United Kingdom	For D'Orbigny & Faustin, Fils.
29 July	Clan Macgregor	Steamship	Messrs. Ramage & Ferguson	Leith	United Kingdom	For Clan Line.
29 July	Moss Brow	Steamship	Messrs. Turnbull & Son	Whitby	United Kingdom	For Messrs Pyman Bros.
31 July	Amerigo Vespucci	Corvette	Venice Naval Yard	Venice	Italy	For Regia Marina.
31 July	El Dorado	Steamship	Messrs. T. & W. Smith	North Shields	United Kingdom	For Messrs. Scrutton & Co.
31 July	Taygete	Steamship	Barrow Shipbuilding Co.	Barrow-in-Furness	United Kingdom	For Compagnie Fraissinet.
July	Chaloupe V	Tug	Messrs. Lobnitz & Co.	Renfrew	United Kingdom	For Panama Canal Company.
July	Chaloupe VI	Tug	Messrs. Lobnitz & Co.	Renfrew	United Kingdom	For Panama Canal Company.
July	Ellen	Schoonner	Mr. Prosser	Bridgwater	United Kingdom	Purchased shortly after launch by Mr. Jobson.
July	Hilda	Steamship	Aitken & Mansel	Whiteinch	United Kingdom	For London and South Western Railway.
July	Hudson Bay	Merchantman	Messrs. Russell & Co.	Greenock	United Kingdom	For Messrs. Hatfield, Cameron & Co.
July	Sibylla	Steamboat	James Fenton	Loch Tay	United Kingdom	For private owner.
July	Sierra Parima	Merchantman	Messrs. John Reid & Co.	Port Glasgow	United Kingdom	For Messrs. Thomson, Anderson & Co.
July	Toward	Steamship	Messrs. William Simons & Co.	Renfrew	United Kingdom	For Clyde Lighthouse Trust.
July	Zulu	Steamship	Messrs. H. M'Intyre & Co.	Paisley	United Kingdom	For Messrs. William Ewing & Co.
1 August	Benwell Tower	Steamship	Messrs. Wigham, Richardson & Co.	Low Walker-on-Tyne	United Kingdom	For Tower Line.
1 August	Mexican	Steamship	James Laing	Deptford	United Kingdom	For Union Steamship Company.
1 August	Port Jackson	Merchantman		Aberdeen	United Kingdom	For Messrs. J. Duthie & Sons.
1 August	Prinses Wilhelmina	Steamship	Messrs. John Elder & Co.	Govan	United Kingdom	For Stoomvaart Maatschappij Nederland.
1 August	Resolven	Steamship	Messrs. Palmer & Co.	Jarrow-on-Tyne	United Kingdom	For Messrs. John Cory & Sons.
1 August	Troutbeck	Steamship	Messrs. Priestman & Co.	Sunderland	United Kingdom	For Fisher, Renwick & Co.
1 August	Ville de Ceara	Steamship	Messrs. Schlesinger, Davis & Co.	Wallsend	United Kingdom	For La Société Postale Française de l'Atlantique.
1 August	Wellfield	Steamship	Messrs. Edward Withy & Co.	Middleton	United Kingdom	For Messrs. R. Ropner & Co.
2 August	Advance	Steamship	Tyneside Engine Works Company (Limited)	Cardiff	United Kingdom	For Messrs. W. & H. R. Strong.
2 August	Ardancorrach	Steamship	Messrs. Blackwood & Gordon	Port Glasgow	United Kingdom	For Messrs. Mclaren, Crum & Co.
2 August	Glenorchy	Sailing ship	Sunderland Shipbuilding Company	Sunderland	United Kingdom	For Messrs. Macintyre & Co.
2 August	Rowan	Steamship	Messrs. H. M'Intyre & Co.	Paisley	United Kingdom	For Messrs. P. H. Dixon & Co.
2 August	Vito	Steamship	Messrs. Caird & Purdie	Barrow-in-Furness	United Kingdom	For Messrs. John Glyn & Sons.
3 August	Camma	Steamship	Messrs. M. Pearse & Co.	Stockton-on-Tees	United Kingdom	For F. Herkind.
3 August	Craighill	Steamship	Messrs. Dobson & Charles	Grangemouth	United Kingdom	For Messrs. Walker, Donald & Co.
3 August	Thornycroft	Steamship	Messrs. William Gray & Co.	West Hartlepool	United Kingdom	For Messrs. Murrell & Yeoman.
4 August	Kingdom	Steamship	William Doxford & Sons	Sunderland	United Kingdom	For William Thomas & Co.
5 August	Aigburth	Merchantman	Messrs. Williamson & Co.	Workington	United Kingdom	For Messrs. Leyland & Co.
5 August	Holderness	Steamship	Earle's Shipbuilding and Engineering Company	Hull	United Kingdom	For Holderness Steam Shipping Company.
5 August	Krasnowodsk	Paddle steamer	Messrs. William Crichton & Co.	Åbo	(Russian Empire) Grand Duchy of Finland	For Imperial Russian Government.
9 August	Albatross	Research vessel	Pusey & Jones	Wilmington, Delaware	United States	For United States Navy.
11 August	Ferry No. 7	Steamboat	W. S. Cumming	Monkland Canal	United Kingdom	For Clyde Trustees.
12 August	Ayrshire	Steamship	Messrs. Pearce & Co.	Dundee	United Kingdom	For Messrs. Smith & Sons.
12 August	Firth of Olna	Merchantman	Messrs. Dobie & Co.	Govan	United Kingdom	For Firth Line, or Messrs. James Spencer & Co.
14 August	Hypolite Worms	Steamship	Messrs. Lobnitz & Co.	Renfrew	United Kingdom	For Messrs. Worms, Josse & Co.
14 August	Klyde	Steamship	Messrs. C. S. Swan & Hunter	Wallsend	United Kingdom	For Klyde Steamship Company.
14 August	Lady Isabella	Merchantman	Messrs. A. M'Millan & Sons	Dumbarton	United Kingdom	For North British Shipping Company, or Messrs. Grierson & Co.
14 August	Noord-Brabant	Steamship	Messrs. Raylton Dixon & Co.	Middlesbrough	United Kingdom	For private owner.
15 August	Balgairn	Steamship	Messrs. Hall, Russell & Co.	Footdee	United Kingdom	For Messrs. J. & A. Davidson
15 August	City of Cambridge	Steamship	Messrs. Workman, Clark & Co.	Belfast	United Kingdom	For Messrs. George Smith & Sons.
15 August	Clan Forbes	Steamship	Messrs. Alexander Stephen & Sons	Linthouse	United Kingdom	For Clan Line.
15 August	Clan Sinclair	Steamship	Messrs. Napier, Shanks & Bell	Yoker	United Kingdom	For Clan Line.
15 August	Glen Dochart	Steamship	Messrs. Schlesinger, Davis & Co.	Wallsend	United Kingdom	For Thomas M'Nabb & W. M. Young.
15 August	Hatfield	Steamship	Messrs. W. Gray & Co.	West Hartlepool	United Kingdom	For T. S. Hudson.
15 August	Limpet	Steamship	Messrs. Barclay, Curle & Co.	Whiteinch	United Kingdom	For Messrs G. & J. Burns.
15 August	Nerissa	Steamship	Flensburger Schiffbau-Gesellschaft	Flensburg	Germany	For .
15 August	Sir Charles Whetham	Steam trawler	Castle Steel & Iron Works Company (Limited)	Milford Haven	United Kingdom	For S. Lake.
15 August	Victory	Steamship	Messrs. Richardson, Duck & Co.	South Stockton	United Kingdom	For Messrs. Macintyre Brothers & Co.
16 August	Constance	Paddle trawler	J. T. Eltringham	South Shields	United Kingdom	For Messrs. W. H. Shawcross & Co.
16 August	Glenochil	Steamship	Messrs. J. L. Thompson & Sons	Sunderland	United Kingdom	For Messrs. Lindsay, Gracie & Co.
16 August	Talisman	Steamship	William Watson	Greenocjk	United Kingdom	For Messrs. William M'Lachlan & Co.
18 August	Seraglio	Steamship	Messrs. Robert Steele & Co.	Greenock	United Kingdom	For Messrs. Raeburn & Veril.
24 August	Whampoa	Steamship	Messrs. Scott & Co.	Greenock	United Kingdom	For Messrs. Service & Sons.
26 August	Flaxman	Steamship	Messrs. Oswald, Mordaunt & Co.	Southampton	United Kingdom	For Messrs. Lamport & Holt.
27 August	Eureka	Steamship	The Strand Slipway Company	Sunderland	United Kingdom	For Eureka Steamship Co. Ltd.
28 August	Kaimon	Corvette	Yokosuka Naval Arsenal	Yokosuka	Japan	For Imperial Japanese Navy.
29 August	Drummuir	Merchantman	Messrs. W. H. Potter & Son	Liverpool	United Kingdom	For Messrs. Gillison & Chadwick.
29 August	Eureka		Strand Ship-building Yard	Sunderland	United Kingdom	For Messrs. Osborne and Wallis.
29 August	Helenslea	Barque	Messrs. Alexander Stephen & Sons	Dundee	United Kingdom	For Messrs. Alexander Stephen & Sons.
29 August	Hesleyside	Steamship	D. Baxter & Co.	Sunderland	United Kingdom	For Charlton, McAllum & Co.
29 August	Rive de Gier	Steamship	Palmer's Shipbuilding & Iron Company (Limited)	Howdon	United Kingdom	For D'Orbigny & Faustin, Fils.
29 August	Rivoli	Steamship	Tyne Iron Shipbuilding Company	Willington Quay	United Kingdom	For Messrs. Stephens & Mawson.
29 August	Wykeham	Steamship	Messrs. Turnbull	Whitby	United Kingdom	For Messrs. Robinson, Rowland & Marwood.
30 August	Albany	Steamship	Messrs. Alexander Stephen & Sons	Linthouse	United Kingdom	For Messrs. John Warrack & Co.
30 August	Ards	Steamship	MacIlwaine & Lewis	Belfast	United Kingdom	For Messrs. Walker, Sefton & Dunn.
30 August	Cumbrae	Steamship	Messrs. W. Simons & Co.	Renfrew	United Kingdom	For Clyde Lighthouse Trust, or Clyde Shipping Company.
30 August	Ecclefechan	Clipper	Messrs. Robert Duncah & Co.	Port Glasgow	United Kingdom	For Village Line.
30 August	Louise	Steamship	Abercorn Shipbuilding Company	Paisley	United Kingdom	For Douglas Steam Navigation Company (Limited).
30 August	Pixie	Steam barge	Messrs. MacIlwaine & Lewis	Belfast	United Kingdom	For Messrs. James Fairclough & Son.
30 August	Silksworth	Steamship	Messrs. Edward Withy & Co.	Middleton	United Kingdom	For Marquis of Londonderry.
30 August	Sumatra	Steamship	Messrs. John Elder & Co.	Govan	United Kingdom	For Stoomvaart Maatschappij Nederland.
30 August	Ville de Valence	Steamship	Robert Thompson & Sons	Sunderland	United Kingdom	For Compagnie Havraise Peninsulaire Navigation à Vapeur.
31 August	Ballaarat	Steamship	Messrs. Caird & Co.	Greenock	United Kingdom	For Peninsular and Oriental Steamship Company.
31 August	Hauroto	Steamship	Messrs. William Denny & Bros.	Dumbarton	United Kingdom	For Union Steamship Company of New Zealand (Limited).
31 August	Karaweera	Steamship	Messrs. Hodgson & Soulsby	Blyth	United Kingdom	For Messrs. Harrold Bros.
31 August	Norseman	Steamship	Messrs. Laird Bros.	Birkenhead	United Kingdom	For British and North Atlantic Steam Navigation Company (Limited).
31 August	Pixie	Steam barge	Messrs. M'Ilwaine & Lewis	Belfast	United Kingdom	For Messrs. James Fairclough & Sons.
31 August	Saltwick	Steamship	Joseph L. Thompson & Sons	Sunderland	United Kingdom	For John H. Barry & Co.
31 August	Waterloo	Steamship	Messrs. John Readhead & Co.	South Shields	United Kingdom	For W. D. C. Balls.
August	Kawatiro	Steamship	Messrs. H. M'Intyre & Co.	location	United Kingdom	For Westport Colliery Company.
August	Parahyba	Steamship	W. B. Thompson	Whiteinch	United Kingdom	For Messrs. Fry, Miers & Co.
August	William	Steamship	Messrs. Scott & Co.	Bowling	United Kingdom	For Messrs. J. Macfarlane.
1 September	Ballina	Steamship	Messrs. A. & J. Inglis	Pointhouse	United Kingdom	For Messrs. Gray, Dawes & Co.
2 September	Fannie	Steamship	Messrs. W. Gray & Co.	West Hartlepool	United Kingdom	For Messrs. C. Nielson & Co.
2 September	Henrietta	Paddle tender	Messrs. Raylton Dixon & Co.	Middlesbrough	United Kingdom	For Mr. Blacklin.
2 September	Rhymney	Steamship	Kish, Boolds & Co.	Pallion	United Kingdom	For Morel Bros & Co.
2 September	Skulda	Steamship	Messrs. S. H. Morton & Co.	Leith	United Kingdom	For Messrs. T. Salvesen & Co.
4 September	Eden	Steamship	Barrow Ship Building Co. Ltd.	Barrow-in-Furness	United Kingdom	For Royal Mail Steam Packet Company.
11 September	Ardour	Steamship	Palmer's Shipbuilding and Iron Company, Limited	Jarrow	United Kingdom	For D'Orbigny & Faustin, Fils.
11 September	City of Benares	East Indiaman	Messrs. Barclay, Curle & Co.	Whiteijnch	United Kingdom	For Messrs. George Smith & Sons.
12 September	Lero	Steamship	James Laing	Deptford	United Kingdom	For W. & J. W. Pinkney.
12 September	Union	East Indiaman	Messrs. Russell & Co.	Greenock	United Kingdom	For Antonio Dom Bordes.
13 September	Aston Hall	Steamship	Messrs. Gourlay Bros.	Dundee	United Kingdom	For Messrs. Alexander & Radcliffe.
13 September	Hammonia	Steamship	Messrs. James & George Thompson	Clydebank	United Kingdom	For Hamburg-Amerikanische Packetfahrt-Actien-Gesellschaft.
13 September	Nerissa	Steamship	Flensburger Schiffbau-Gesellschaft	Flensburg	Germany	For A. Kirsten.
13 September	Nubia	Steamship	Messrs. D. & W. Henderson & Co.	Meadowside	United Kingdom	For Anchor Line.
13 September	Pacaxo	Steamship	London and Glasgow Engineering Company	Govan	United Kingdom	For Brazil Steamship Company (Limited).
13 September	Spasabel	Steamship	Messrs. William Crichton & Co.	Åbo	(Russian Empire) Grand Duchy of Finland	For private owner.
13 September	Vanduara	Merchantman	Messrs. C. Connell & Co.	Scotstoun	United Kingdom	For J. D. Click and others.
13 September	Watlington	Steamship	William Gray & Co.	West Hartlepool	United Kingdom	For Messrs. R. Ropner & Co.
13 September	Woodside	Steamship	North of England Shipbuilding Company	Pallion	United Kingdom	For T. G. Greenwell.
14 September	Aréthuse	Cruiser	Arsenal de Toulon	Toulon	France	For French Navy.
14 September	Brier	Steamship	Messrs. David & William Henderson & Co.	Partick	United Kingdom	For Glasgow and Londonderry Steam Packet Company, or Messrs. A. A. Laird & Co.
14 September	Eppleton	Steamship	S. P. Austin & Co. Ltd.	Sunderland	United Kingdom	For Sharp & Co.
14 September	Florence	Steamship	Messrs. Thomas B. Seath & Co.	Rutherglen	United Kingdom	For Messrs. J. J. Mack & Co.
14 September	Gardepee	Steamship	William Pickersgill & Sons	Southwick	United Kingdom	For Morel Bros. & Co.
14 September	George Gordon	Merchantman	Messrs. Birrell, Stenhouse & Co.	Dumbarton	United Kingdom	For North British Shipping Company.
15 September	Beeswing	Steamship	Messrs. Dobson & Charles	Grangemouth	United Kingdom	For Universal Steam Shipping Company.
15 September	Gerarda	Steamship	Messrs. C. Mitchell & Co.	Newcastle upon Tyne	United Kingdom	For Joseph Fawcett.
15 September	Ruby	Steamship	Messrs. John Fullarton & Co.	Paisley	United Kingdom	For Messrs. Mitchell & Rae.
16 September	Bow Fell	Steamship	Messrs. Murdoch & Murray	Port Glasgow	United Kingdom	For Fell Line, or Messrs. Hume, Smith & Co.
16 September	Cornucopia	Steamship	Osbourne, Graham & Co.	North Hylton	United Kingdom	For Turnbull, Potts & Co.
16 September	Libau	Steamship	Messrs. Robert Napier & Sons	Govan	United Kingdom	For Compagnie Fraissinet.
16 September	Neto	Steamship	Messrs. Dobie & Co.	Govan	United Kingdom	For Messrs. Strong, Reid & Page.
18 September	Jeremiah	Fishing boat	James Duncan	Kingston-on-Spey	United Kingdom	For William Gardiner.
18 September	Miltonpark	East Indiaman	Messrs. A. M'Millan & Co.	Dumbarton	United Kingdom	For Messrs. Griersonn & Co.
26 September	Draco	Steamship	Earle's Shipbuilding and Engineering Company (Limited)	Hull	United Kingdom	For Thomas Wilson, Sons, & Co.
26 September	Lady Cathcart	Steamship	Messrs. Alexander Hall & Sons	Aberdeen	United Kingdom	For Aberdeen Lime Company.
27 September	Fuhnen	Corvette			Denmark	For Royal Danish Navy.
27 September	Ilala	Merchantman	Whitehaven Shipbuilding Company	Whitehaven	United Kingdom	For Messrs. Lowden, Edgar & Co.
27 September	Loire Inférieure	Steamship	Messrs. Pearce Brothers	Dundee	United Kingdom	For Compagnie Nantaise.
27 September	Malta	Steamship	Messrs. John Readhead & Sons	South Shields	United Kingdom	For William D. C. Balls.
27 September	Primauguet	Cruiser	Arsenal de Rochefort	Rochefort	France	For French Navy.
27 September	Samuel George Homfray	Pilot cutter	J. Williams	Newport	United Kingdom	For Mr. Evans.
27 September	Shap Fell	Steamship	Campbeltown Shipbuilding Company	Campbeltown	United Kingdom	For Messrs. Hume, Smith & Co.
27 September	Scorff	Allier-class transport	Arsenal de Lorient	Lorient	France	For French Navy
27 September	T. J. Robson	Steamship	Messrs. Schlesinger, Davis & Co.	Wallsend	United Kingdom	For Messrs. Ward & Holzapfel.
28 September	Brankelow	Steamship	Messrs. M. Pearse & Co.	Stockton-on-Tees	United Kingdom	For Messrs. W. Wheatley & Co.
28 September	Kiang-yu	Paddle steamer	Messrs. A. & J. Inglis	Pointhouse	United Kingdom	For China Merchants Steam Navigation Company.
28 September	Louise	Steamship	Messrs. Raylton Dixon & Co.	Middlesbrough	United Kingdom	For Messrs. Burdick & Cook.
28 September	Rennie	Steamship	Tyne Iron Shipbuilding Company	Wallsend	United Kingdom	For J. Watt & Partners.
28 September	Electricity	Electric boat	Electrical Power Storage Company	Millwall	United Kingdom	For Electrical Power Storage Company.
29 September	An Ding	Hopper dredger	Messrs. W. Simons & Co.	Renfrew	United Kingdom	For Imperial Chinese Government.
29 September	Craigton	Steamship	Messrs. Ramage & Ferguson	Leith	United Kingdom	For Glasgow Steamship Company (Limited).
29 September	Hye Leong	Steamship	Messrs. Blackwood & Gordon	Port Glasgow	United Kingdom	For Messrs MacNicoll & Smith, or Messrs. Martin, Turner & Co.
29 September	Ingram	Steamship	Messrs. E. Withy & Co	Middleton	United Kingdom	For Messrs. Steel, Young & Co.
29 September	Thomas Allen	Steamship	Bartram, Haswell, & Co.	Sunderland	United Kingdom	For John Allen.
30 September	Ceres	Steamship	Kockums Mekaniska Werkstads Aktie Bolag	Malmö	Sweden	For Sydsvenska Angfartygs Aktie Bolag.
30 September	Dilsberg	Steamship	Messrs. Murdoch & Murray	Port Glasgow	United Kingdom	For Messrs. Raeburn & Verel.
30 September	Lansdowne Tower	Steamship	Messrs. Wigham, Richardson & Co.	Low Walker	United Kingdom	For Messrs. Stumore, Weston & Co.
30 September	Leicester Castle	Merchantman	Messrs. Oswald, Mordaunt & Co.	Southampton	United Kingdom	For John Coupland.
30 September	Miniera	Steamship	Messrs. R. & J. Evans	Liverpool	United Kingdom	For Messrs. Richards, Mills & Co., and Messrs. Richards, Tweedy & Co.
30 September	Tarawera	Steamship	Messrs. Denny Bros.	Dumbarton	United Kingdom	For Union Steamship Company of New Zealand (Limited).
30 September	Violante	Steamship	Messrs. Edward Finch & Co., Limited	Chepstow	United Kingdom	For Messrs. Cuthbert & Hancock.
September	Dagmar	Steamship	Lemil Abrahamson	Gothenburg	Sweden	For private owner.
September	Monnica	Steamship	De Maas	Delfshaven	Netherlands	For Crofton Shipping Company Limited.
September	Nubia	Steamship	D. W. Henderson & Co.	Meadowside	United Kingdom	For Anchor Line.
September	Sarawera	Steamship	Messrs. William Denny & Bros.	Dumbarton	United Kingdom	For Union Steamship Company of New Zealand.
September	Woosung	Steamship	Messrs. Scott & Co.	Greenock	United Kingdom	For Messrs. John Swire & Sons.
3 October	Angers	Steamship	D. P. Garbutt	Hull	United Kingdom	For Messrs. Angiers Bros.
4 October	Taurus	Steamship	Messrs. A. M'Millan & Son	Dumbarton	United Kingdom	For Compagnie Fraissinet.
7 October	H. A. Hartmann	Steamship	Flensburger Schiffbau-Gesellschaft	Flensburg	Germany	For H. C. Clausen.
8 October	Allonby	Steamship	Robert Thompson & Sons	Sunderland	United Kingdom	For Peter Iredale & Son.
10 October	Empress	Steam yacht	Earle's Shipbuilding and Engineering Company	Hull	United Kingdom	For Andrew Barclay Walker.
11 October	Kelvinside	East Indiaman	Messrs. Barclay, Curle & Co	Whiteinch	United Kingdom	For Messrs. Walker, Duncan & Co.
12 October	Genista	Merchantman	Messrs. W. H. Potter & Son	Liverpool	United Kingdom	For Messrs. Tinne, Sandbach & Co.
12 October	Manuel L. Villaverde	Steamship	Messrs. Lobnitz & Co.	Renfrew	United Kingdom	For Compania Transatlantica.
12 October	Owain Tudur	Steamship	Messrs. Samuel Brothers	Llanelly	United Kingdom	For Messrs. Parry, Jones & Co.
12 October	Romanby	Steamship	Messrs. W. Gray & Co.	West Hartlepool	United Kingdom	For Messrs. Middleton & Co.
12 October	Skerryvore	Steamship	Messrs. Workman, Clake & Co.	Belfast	United Kingdom	For Clyde Shipping Company.
13 October	Dailo	Steamboat	Richard Smith	Preston	United Kingdom	For Messrs. Nelson & Sons.
14 October	Clyde	Paddle steamer	Messrs. T. & W. Toward	Newcastle upon Tyne	United Kingdom	For Britannia Steam Shipping Company.
14 October	Colonsay	Steamship	Messrs. William Hamilton & Co.	Port Glasgow	United Kingdom	For Messrs. John Allan & Co.
14 October	Dauntless	Steamship	Messrs. T. & W. Smith	North Shields	United Kingdom	For Messrs. Hall Bros.
14 October	Dundee	Barque	W. B. Thompson	Dundee	United Kingdom	For Charles Barrie.
14 October	Glenmore	Steamship	Messrs. Key & Sons	Kinghorn	United Kingdom	For private owner.
14 October	Roland	Villars-class cruiser	Arsenal de Cherbourg	Cherbourg	France	For French Navy.
14 October	Wordsworth	Steamship	Messrs. W. Gray & Co.	West Hartlepool	United Kingdom	For Messrs. Glover Bros.
16 October	Britannia	Steamship	Short Brothers	Sunderland	United Kingdom	For United Kingdom Steamship Co. Ltd.
16 October	Celtic	Steamship	Messrs. John Fullarton & Co.	Merksworth	United Kingdom	For Messrs. J. & J. Macfarlane.
17 October	Taiwan	Steamship	Messrs. Scott & Co.	Cartsdyke	United Kingdom	For Messrs. Swire & Sons.
18 October	Umberto Arbib	Steamship	Messrs. Oswald, Mordaunt & Co.	Southampton	United Kingdom	For Messrs. E. & E. Arbib.
20 October	Nigel	Steamship	Messrs. Robert Steele & Co.	Greenock	United Kingdom	For Messrs. George Hood & Co.
22 October	Vladimir Monomakh	Armoured cruiser	Baltic Shipyard	Saint Petersburg	Russia	For Imperial Russian Navy.
26 October	Alessandro	Steamship	Messrs. Pearce Brothers & Co.	Dundee	United Kingdom	For Messrs. John Thompson & Co.
26 October	Glenfyne	Barque	Messrs. A. Stephen & Sons	Dundee	United Kingdom	For Messrs. W. & O. Taylor & Co.
26 October	Henrietta	Steamship	Messrs. Turbull & Sons	Whitby	United Kingdom	For Messrs. Best, Ryley & Co.
26 October	Sumatra	Merchantman	Messrs. Russell & Co.	Greenock	United Kingdom	For Messrs. Peter Dennistoun & Co.
26 October	Trevose	Steamship	John Readhead & Sons	South Shields	United Kingdom	For Edward Hain and Son.
27 October	Chiapas	Steamship	Messrs. James & George Thompson	Clydebank	United Kingdom	For Direct Line, or Messrs. David Caw & Co.
28 October	Cedric	Steamship	Messrs. M. Pearse & Co.	Stockton-on-Tees	United Kingdom	For Richard J. Kay.
28 October	Gondola	Steamship	William Pickersgill & Sons	Southwick	United Kingdom	For J. P. Ninnes & Son.
28 October	Inchgarvie	Steamship	Messrs. C. Mitchell & Co.	Low Walker	United Kingdom	For Inch Line.
28 October	Leander	Cruiser	Messrs. Robert Napier & Sons	Glasgow	United Kingdom	For Royal Navy.
28 October	Newcastle City	Steamship	Messrs. Edward Withy & Co.	Middleton	United Kingdom	For C. Furness, or Furness Line.
28 October	Normandie	Steamship	Barrow Ship Building Co. Ltd.	Barrow-in-Furness	United Kingdom	For Compagnie Générale Transatlantique.
28 October	Pinmore	Merchantman	Messrs. J. Reid & Co.	Port Glasgow	United Kingdom	For Messrs. John Kerr & Co.
28 October	Sculptor	Steamship	Messrs. Raylton Dixon & Co.	Middlesbrough	United Kingdom	For Messrs. T. & J. Harrison.
28 October	Sir Garnet Wolseley	Steamship	Palmer's Shipbuilding and Iron Company	Jarrow	United Kingdom	For Messrs. Simpson & Page.
28 October	Tomki	Steamship	Messrs. R. & H. Green	Blackwall	United Kingdom	For Clarence and Richmond Rivers Steam Navigation Company.
30 October	Chirton	Steamship	Messrs. T. & W. Smith	North Shields	United Kingdom	For Messrs. Eskdale, Dodds & Co.
30 October	Gwendoline	Steamship	Palmer's Shipbuilding and Iron Company	Howdon	United Kingdom	For Messrs. John Wilson & Co.
30 October	Lizard	Tug	Messrs. Edward Finch & Co., Limited	Chepstow	United Kingdom	For private owner.
30 October	Norman Prince	Steamship	Messrs. Hodgson & Soulsby	Blyth, Northumberland	United Kingdom	For J. Knott.
30 October	Rhenania	Steamship	Messrs. Dobie & Co.	Govan	United Kingdom	For Messrs. William H. Müller & Co.
31 October	Newcomen	Steamship	Messrs. Robert Duncan & Co.	Port Glasgow	United Kingdom	For Messr Leitch & Muir.
October	Bellmore	Steamship	Messrs. H. M'Intyre & Co.	Merksworth	United Kingdom	For Messrs. Little & Co., or Messrs. Bell Brothers & MacLellan.
October	Balder	Steamship	Lindholmen Mekaniska Verkstad	Gothenburg	Sweden	For J. C. Gjertsent.
October	Investigator	Steamship	Messrs. D. & W. Henderson & Co.	Partick	United Kingdom	For Messrs. Spencers, Guck & Co., or Spencers Gulph Steamship Company.
October	Kristianstad	Steamship	Ljungren's Mekaniska Verkstad	Kristianstad	Sweden	For Kristianstads Iingbätaktiebolag.
October	Monica	Steamship		Delfshaven	Netherlands	For private owner.
1 November	Goya	Steamship	Messrs. W. B. Thompson & Co.	Dundee	United Kingdom	For private owner.
2 November	Dolcoath	Steamship	James Laing	Sunderland	United Kingdom	For Messrs. Osborne and Wallis.
7 November	Mereo	Steamship	Flensburger Schiffbau-Gesellschaft	Flensburg	Germany	For Messrs. H. Schuldt & Co.
8 November	Teviotdale	Merchantman	Messrs. Alexander Stephen & Sons	Linthouse	United Kingdom	For Messrs. J. & A. Roxburgh.
11 November	Bay of Aboukir	Steamship	Messrs. Wigham, Richardson & Co.	Newcastle upon Tyne	United Kingdom	For Messrs. W. W. Long & Taylor.
11 November	Carbis Bay	Steamship	Schlesinger, Davis and Co.	Wallsend	United Kingdom	For Carbis Bay Steamship Company.
11 November	Deerhound	Steamship	Messrs. W. Gray & Co.	West Hartlepool	United Kingdom	For Messrs. Callender, White & Hunter.
11 November	Ednyfed	Barque	William Doxford & Sons	Pallion	United Kingdom	For Messrs. Robert Thomas & Co.
11 November	Ensign	Steamship	Messrs. T. B. Seath & Co	Rutherglen	United Kingdom	For J. R. Currie.
11 November	Glen Tilt	Steamship	Messrs. Alexander Stephen & Sons	Aberdeen	United Kingdom	For private owner.
11 November	J. M. Lockwood	Steamship	William Gray & Co.	West Hartlepool	United Kingdom	For John Murrell & Co.
11 November	Kilbrannan	Merchantman	Messrs. Russell & Co.	Port Glasgow	United Kingdom	For Messrs. Kerr, Newton & Co.
11 November	King's Cross	Steamship	Palmer's Shipbuilding and Iron Co. (Limited)	Jarrow	United Kingdom	For Messrs. George Loram & Sons.
11 November	Kirby Hall	Steamship	London and Glasgow Shipbuilding and Engineering Company	Govan	United Kingdom	For Hall Line.
11 November	Parramatta	Steamship	Messrs. Caird & Co.	Greenock	United Kingdom	For Peninsular and Oriental Steam Navigation Company.
11 November	West Lothian	Merchantman	Messrs. Charles Connell & Co.	Scotstoun	United Kingdom	For James Boyd.
11 November	Westmeath	Steamship	Sunderland Shipbuilding Company, Limited	Sunderland	United Kingdom	For R. M. Hudson.
11 November	Unnamed	Steamship	Messrs. Richardson, Duck & Co.	Stockton-on-Tees	United Kingdom	For Messrs. T. Binnington & Co.
11 November	Unnamed	Steamship	Messrs. R. D. Ross	Inverkeithing	United Kingdom	For Messrs. W. G. Lochhead.
13 November	Cousins Arbib	Steamship	Messrs. Raylton Dixon & Co.	Middlesbrough	United Kingdom	For Messrs. E. & E. Arbib.
13 November	Monkseaton	Steamship	Messrs. C. S. Swan & Hunter	Wallsend	United Kingdom	For Messrs. Elliott, Lowrey & Durnford.
14 November	Ardanrigh	Steamship	Messrs. Napier, Shanks & Bell	Yoker	United Kingdom	For Messrs. Maclaren, Crum & Co.
14 November	Lauderdale	Steamship	W. B. Thompson	Whiteinch	United Kingdom	For Dale Line, or Messrs. R. MacKill & Co.
15 November	Clive	Troopship	Messrs. Laird Bros.	Birkenhead	United Kingdom	For Royal Indian Navy.
15 November	Fulda	Steamship	Messrs. John Elder & Co.	Fairfield	United Kingdom	For Norddeutsche Lloyd.
15 November	Golconda	Steamship	Messrs. A. J. Inglis	Pointhouse	United Kingdom	For British India Steam Navigation Company.
15 November	Polcevera	Steamship	Messrs. Blackwood & Gordon	Port Glasgow	United Kingdom	For Societa Italiana di Transporti Maritimi, Raggio e Cia, or Messrs. Carlo, Raggio e Cia.
16 November	Gogoburn	Barque	Messrs. Birrell, Stenhouse & Co.	Dumbarton	United Kingdom	For Burn Line. or Morris Carswell.
18 November	Changchow	Steamship	Messrs. Scott & Co.	Greenock	United Kingdom	For Messrs John Swire & Sons.
18 November	Rajore	Steamship	Messrs. Oswald, Mordaunt & Co.	Southampton	United Kingdom	For Messrs. Eyre, Evasnn & Co.
22 November	Biscaye	Steamship	John Blumer & Co.	Sunderland	United Kingdom	For Delmas Frères & Co.
22 November	Collingwood	Admiral-class battleship	Pembroke Dockyard	Pembroke	United Kingdom	For Royal Navy.
22 November	Daylesford	Steamship	Robert Thompson & Sons	Southwick-on-the-Wear	United Kingdom	For Burrell & Son.
22 November	Lady Ann	Steamship	S. P. Austin & Sons	Sunderland	United Kingdom	For H. T. Morton & Co.
22 November	Scorton	Steamship	Messrs. Readhead & Co.	South Shields	United Kingdom	For Messrs. Chapman & Miller.
23 November	Devonia	Steamship	Messrs. Murdoch & Murray	Port Glasgow	United Kingdom	For Messrs. Dunsmuir & Jackson, or Torquay Company (Limited), or London and South-West Coast Steamship Company, Limited.
24 November	Clan Ogilvie	Steamship	Messrs. Alexander Stephen & Sons	Linthouse	United Kingdom	For Clan Line.
25 November	Aberdare	Steamship	Palmer's Shipbuilding and Engineering Company (Limited)	Howdon	United Kingdom	For Messrs. Morel, Brothers & Co.
25 November	Cairo	Steamship	Messrs. Raylton Dixon & Co	Middlesbrough	United Kingdom	For Messrs. Raylton Dixon & Co.
25 November	Caroline	Satellite-class sloop		Sheerness Dockyard	United Kingdom	For Royal Navy.
25 November	Forth	Hopper dredger	Messrs. William Simons & Co.	Renfrew	United Kingdom	For Messrs. Lawson & Best.
25 November	Glengoil	Steamship	Joseph L. Thompson & Sons	Sunderland	United Kingdom	For Glengoil Steamship Co.
25 November	Hartburn	Steamship	Messrs. Edward Withy & Co	Middleton	United Kingdom	For Messrs. R. Ropner & Co.
25 November	Kalmia	Merchantman	Messrs. W. H. Potter & Co.	Liverpool	United Kingdom	For Messrs. Sandbach, Tinne & Co.
25 November	Liverpool	Merchantman	Messrs. Dobie & Co.	Govan	United Kingdom	For W. Price & Co.
25 November	Prince Llewellyn	Steamship	Messrs. Palmer's Shipbuilding and Iron Company	Jarrow-on-Tyne	United Kingdom	For Messrs. J. & R. Bovey.
25 November	Rengoil	Steamship	Messrs. Joseph L. Thompson & Sons	Sunderland	United Kingdom	For Messrs. Lindsay, Pracie & Co.
25 November	Waihora	Cargo liner	William Denny & Brothers	Dumbarton	United Kingdom	For Union Steamship Company of New Zealand.
25 November	William Hope	Steamship	Messrs. Hamilton & Co.	Leith	United Kingdom	For Messrs. William Hope & Sons.
27 November	Carina	Steamship	Messrs. M. Pearse & Co.	Stockton-on-Tees	United Kingdom	For H. Cloake.
27 November	Louie Bell	Merchantman	Paul Rodgers	Carrickfergus	United Kingdom	For Messrs. James Fisher & Sons.
27 November	Oread	Barque	Messrs. Thomas Royden & Sons	Liverpool	United Kingdom	For James Newton.
27 November	Saintonge	Steamship	John Blumer & Co.	Sunderland	United Kingdom	For Delmas Frères & Co.
28 November	Cintra	Steamship	Messrs. Napier, Shanks & Bell	Yoker	United Kingdom	For Australasian Steamship Navigation Company.
28 November	City of Madras	Merchantman	Messrs. Barclay, Curle & Co.	Whiteinch	United Kingdom	For Messrs. George Smith & Sons.
28 November	Imberhorne	Merchantman	Messrs. Archibald M'Millan & Son	Dumbarton	United Kingdom	For Messrs. W. R. Price & Co.
28 November	Kron Prinz	Steamship	Short Bros.	Sunderland	United Kingdom	For J. H. Lorentzen & Co.
28 November	Louie Bell	Merchantman	Paul Rodgers	Carrickfergus	United Kingdom	For Messrs. James Fisher & Son.
28 November	Mapocho	Steamship	Messrs. Laird Bros.	Birkenhead	United Kingdom	For Compania Sud Americana de Vapores.
28 November	Sphinx	Cruiser	Messrs. R. & H. Green	Blackwall	United Kingdom	For Royal Navy.
28 November	Zhenyuan	Turret ship	AG Vulcan Stettin	Stettin	Germany	For Beiyang Fleet, Imperial Chinese Navy.
29 November	Brinio	Steamship	Messrs. Murdoch & Murray	Port Glasgow	United Kingdom	For Messrs. D. Burger & Son.
29 November	Cairo	Steamship	Earle's Shipbuilding and Engineering Company, Limited	Hull	United Kingdom	For Messrs. Thomas Wilson, Sons, & Co.
29 November	Pengwern	East Indiaman	Messrs. Russell & Co.	Greenock	United Kingdom	For Messrs. D. W. Davies & Co.
November	Clan Mackenzie	East Indiaman	Messrs. R. Duncan & Co.	Port Glasgow	United Kingdom	For Messrs. Thomas Dunlop & Sons.
1 December	Edda	Gunboat		Karlskrona	Sweden	For Royal Swedish Navy.
6 December	Puritan	Puritan-class monitor	John Roach & Son	Chester, Pennsylvania	United States	For United States Navy.
7 December	Patricio	Steamship	London and Glasgow Engineering and Iron Shipbuilding Company	Glasgow	United Kingdom	For Brazil Steamship Company.
9 December	Castanos	Steamship	Messrs. Oswald, Mordaunt & Co	Southampton	United Kingdom	For Messrs. Morel Bros.
9 December	Dolphin	Sloop-of-war	Messrs. Raylton Dixon & Co	Middlesbrough	United Kingdom	For Royal Navy.
9 December	Lista	Steamship	W. B. Thomson	Dundee	United Kingdom	For Messrs. R. Macandrew & Co.
9 December	Veronica	Steamship	Messrs. Charles Hill & Sons	Cardiff	United Kingdom	For Messrs. Cuthbert, Hancock & Co.
11 December	Cairo	Steamship	Messrs. T. Turnbull & Son	Whitby	United Kingdom	For Messrs. T. Turnbull & Son.
11 December	Esk	Steamship	Barrow Ship Building Co. Ltd.	Barrow-in-Furness	United Kingdom	For Royal Mail Steam Packet Company.
11 December	Sacrobosco	Steamship	Bartram, Haswell, & Co.	Sunderland	United Kingdom	For Wilkie & Turnbull.
11 December	Santa Maria	Steam yacht	Messrs. John Elder & Co.	Govan	United Kingdom	For Lord Alfred Paget.
12 December	Castlegate	Steamship	Messrs. Hodgson & Soulsby	Blyth	United Kingdom	For Castle Line.
12 December	Embla	Steamship	Messrs. S. & H. Morton & Co.	Leith	United Kingdom	For Messrs. J. T. Salvesen & Co.
12 December	Esk	Steamship	Barrow Ship Building Company	Barrow-in-Furness	United Kingdom	For Royal Mail Steam Packet Company.
12 December	Loch Tay	Steamship	Messrs Gourlay Bros. & Co.	Dundee	United Kingdom	For Loch Line.
12 December	Rosslyn	Steamship	Messrs. Alexander Stephen & Sons	Linthouse	United Kingdom	For Messrs. John Warrach & Co.
12 December	Ville de Tarragone	Steamship	Robert Thompson & Sons	Sunderland	United Kingdom	For Compagnie Havraise Peninsulaire Navigation à Vapeur.
13 December	Anaurus	Merchantman	Messrs. Barclay, Curle & Co.	Whiteinch	United Kingdom	For Messrs. A. & J. H. Carmichael & Co.
13 December	Ashdale	Steamship	Messrs. Dobson & Charles	Grangemouth	United Kingdom	For Clydesdale Steamship Company (Limited).
13 December	Elsa	Steamship	Campbeltown Shipbuilding Company	Campbeltown	United Kingdom	For Steamship Elsa Company (Limited).
13 December	Fero	Steamship	Flensburger Schiffbau-Gesellschaft	Flensburg	Germany	For Messrs. Schuldt & Co.
14 December	British Princess	Passenger ship	Harland & Wolff	Belfast	United Kingdom	For British Shipowners Ltd.
14 December	C. W. Eborall	Steamship	Earle's Shipbuilding and Engineering Company	Hull	United Kingdom	For South Eastern Railway.
14 December	Eddlethorpe	Steamship	William Gray & Co.	West Hartlepool	United Kingdom	For Messrs. C. S. Todd & Co.
15 December	Brighton	Paddle steamer	T.B. Seath & Co.	Rutherglen	United Kingdom	For Port Jackson Steamship Company.
16 December	Mayrink	Steamship	Messrs. David J. Dunlop & Co.	Port Glasgow	United Kingdom	For Messrs. Jonas José dos Reis & Co.
16 December	Port Gordon	Barque	Messrs. Russell & Co.	Port Glasgow	United Kingdom	For Messrs. Crawford, Rowert & Co.
21 December	Count de Lesseps	Dredger		Philadelphia, Pennsylvania	United States	For Panama Canal Company.
22 December	Breslau	Steamship	Messrs. Robert Steele & Co.	Greenock	United Kingdom	For Messrs. James Currie & Co.
23 December	Abington	Steamship	William Doxford & Sons	Sunderland	United Kingdom	For Renton & Co.
23 December	Abrota	Steamship	Messrs. Short Bros.	Pallion	United Kingdom	For Messrs. Graham, Anderson & Co.
23 December	Acaster	Steamship	Priestman & Co.	Sunderland	United Kingdom	For Perry, Raimes & Co.,
23 December	Allie	Steamship	Messrs. Edward Withy & Co.	Middleton	United Kingdom	For Messrs. C. Nielsen & Son.
23 December	Alpha	Steamship	Messrs. Withy & Co.	Middleton	United Kingdom	For Messrs. C. Nielsen & Son.
23 December	Arethusa	Leander-class cruiser	Napier	Glasgow	United Kingdom	For Royal Navy.
23 December	Birch	Steamship	The Strand Slipway Company	Sunderland	United Kingdom	For Peacock Bros.
23 December	East Anglia	Steamship	Messrs. Schlesinger, Davis & Co.	Wallsend	United Kingdom	For Messrs. Ward & Holzapfel.
23 December	Frederick Morel	Steamship	Messrs. John Readhead & Co.	South Shields	United Kingdom	For Compagnie Générale des Bateaux à Vapeur.
23 December	Glenmorven	Steamship	Messrs. Palmer's Shipbuilding Company (Limited)	Jarrow	United Kingdom	For Messrs. Lindsay, Gracie & Co.
23 December	Loch Ard	Steamship	Messrs. Ramage & Ferguson	Leith	United Kingdom	For Dundee Loch Line Steamship Co.
23 December	Millicent	Steamship	Messrs. Kish, Boolds & Co	Pallion	United Kingdom	For Messrs. Fisher, Renwick & Co.
23 December	Mong-Kut	Steamship	Messrs. John Elder & Co.	Fairfield	United Kingdom	For Scottish Oriental Steamship Company.
23 December	Moorhen	Steamship	Messrs. Gray & Co.	West Hartlepool	United Kingdom	For Messrs. G. T. Pearson & Co.
23 December	Navarro	Steamship	Barrow Ship Building Co. Ltd.	Barrow-in-Furness	United Kingdom	For Atlantic & Eastern Steamship Co. Ltd.
23 December	Oregon	Steamship	Messrs. Charles Connell & Co.	Scotstoun	United Kingdom	For Dominion Line.
23 December	Porter	Steamship	Messrs. Irvine & Co	West Hartlepool	United Kingdom	For private owner.
23 December	Richmond Hill	Steamship	Messrs. Henry Murray & Co.	Dumbarton	United Kingdom	For Twin Screw Steamship Line.
23 December	St. Helier	Steamship	Messrs. William Burrell & Son	Dumbarton	United Kingdom	For Messrs. Hacquiel Bros.
23 December	Suffolk	Steamship	Messrs. Green	Blackwall	United Kingdom	For Messrs. Hooper & Co.
23 December	Sylvan	Steamship	Messrs. Murdoch & Murray	Port Glasgow	United Kingdom	For Mr. White.
23 December	Ybarra No. 4	Steamship	Messrs. Raylton Dixon & Co.	Stockton-on-Tees	United Kingdom	For Messrs. Ybarra, Hermanos & Co.
23 December	Ystad	Steamship	Oskarshamn Mekaniska Verkstad	Oskarshamn	Sweden	For private owners.
25 December	Glenogle	Barque	Messrs. Alexander Stephen & Sons	Dundee	United Kingdom	For Dundee Shipowners Association, Limited.
25 December	Kampokus	Steamship	Messrs. David & William Henderson & Co.	Meadowside	United Kingdom	For Messrs Alexander Slorach & Son.
25 December	Waroonga	Cargo liner	A. & J. Inglis	Pointhouse	United Kingdom	For Edwyn S. Dawes., or British India Association.
26 December	Aurania	Ocean liner	J. & G. Thomson & Co.	Glasgow	United Kingdom	For Cunard Line.
26 December	Balkan	Steamship	Messrs. A. M'Millan & Son	Dumbarton	United Kingdom	For Compagnie Fraissenet.
26 December	Cumbrae	Steamship	Messrs. Dobie & Co.	Govan	United Kingdom	For Clyde Shipping Company.
26 December	Isbergues	Steamship	Palmer's Shipbuilding and Iron Company	Howdon	United Kingdom	For D'Orbigny & Faustin Fils.
26 December	Karamania	Steamship	Messrs. A. M'Millan & Son	Dumbarton	United Kingdom	For Anchor Line.
26 December	Ville de Metz	Steamship	James Laing	Deptford	United Kingdom	For Compagnie Havraise Peninsulaire.
26 December	Winchester	Steamship	Palmer's Shipbuilding and Iron Company	Jarrow	United Kingdom	For Messrs. Blindell, Dale & Co.
27 December	Phra-Chom-Kiao	Steamship	Messrs. Caird & Co.	Greenock	United Kingdom	For W. Sinclair.
27 December	Queen	Steamship	Short Bros.	Pallion	United Kingdom	For Taylor & Sanderson.
28 December	Korsör	Paddle train ferry	Kockum Mekaniska Verkstad	Malmö	Sweden	For Danish Government.
30 December	Iolo Morganwg	Steamship	Messrs. Palmer & Co.'s Shipbuilding and Iron Company (Limited)	Jarrow	United Kingdom	For Evan Thomas.
31 December	George H. Warren	Schooner	Porter Keene	North Weymouth, Massachusetts	United States	For John Harry Jeffrey and J. O'Sullivan.
December	Kanysokus	Steamship	Messrs. A. M'Millan & Son	Dumbarton	United Kingdom	For Messrs. R. M. Slorach & Co.
Autumn	Grey Witch	Steam launch	J. Samuel White	Cowes	United Kingdom	For private owner.
Unknown date	Adowa	Merchantman	The Strand Slipway Company	Sunderland	United Kingdom	For Levan & Eastern Steam Navigation Co. Ltd.
Unknown date	Alexandru cel Bun	Minelayer	Thames Iron Works	Leamouth	United Kingdom	For Romanian Flotilla Corps.
Unknown date	Annding	Hopper dredger	Messrs.William Simons & Co.	Renfrew	United Kingdom	For Imperial Chinese Government.
Unknown date	Ardilla	Tug	W. Allsup & Sons	Preston	United Kingdom	For Compania Sud Americianade Vapores.
Unknown date	Bahtone	Barge	Messrs. R. Duncan & Co.	Port Glasgow	United Kingdom	For Irrawaddy Flotilla Company.
Unknown date	Balimba	Steamship	Messrs. A. & J. Inglis	Pointhouse	United Kingdom	For British India Association.
Unknown date	Balnacraig	Steamship	Messrs. Hall, Russell & Co.	Aberdeen	United Kingdom	For Messrs. J. & A. Davidson.
Unknown date	Boucau	Steamship	Palmer's Shipbuilding and Iron Company (Limited)	Jarrow	United Kingdom	For D'Orbigny & Faustin Fils.
Unknown date	Bulimba	Steamship	Messrs. A. & J. Inglis	Pointhouse	United Kingdom	For British India Association.
Unknown date	Burgundia	Steamship	Messrs. Thomas Royden & Sons	Liverpool	United Kingdom	For private owner.
Unknown date	Bygdo	Steamship	Kockums Mekaniska Verkstads Aktie Bolag	Malmö	Sweden	For Christiania Dampskibs Skelskab.
Unknown date	Caerloch	Merchantman	Priestman & Co	Sunderland	United Kingdom	For J. B. Nicol.
Unknown date	City of Newcastle	Steamship	Messrs. C. S. Swan & Hunter	Wallsend	United Kingdom	For Tyne and Wear Steamship Company, Limited.
Unknown date	Coniston Fell	Steamship		Liverpool	United Kingdom	For Messrs. Hume, Smith & Co.
Unknown date	Continental	Bulk carrier		Cleveland, Ohio	United States	For private owner.
Unknown date	Calon	Merchantman	The Strand Slipway Company	Sunderland	United Kingdom	For F. Vuente Duranona.
Unknown date	Cedar Grove	Merchanman	Osbourne, Graham & Co	Sunderland	United Kingdom	For T. A. Stewart.
Unknown date	Celynen	Merchantman	William Doxford & Sons	Sunderland	United Kingdom	For T. Benyon.
Unknown date	Dabulamanzi	Steamship	Hall, Russel & Co. Ltd.	Aberdeen	United Kingdom	For John T. Rennie & Co.
Unknown date	Clan Mackay	Steamship	Bartram, Haswell & Co.	Sunderland	United Kingdom	For Clan Line.
Unknown date	Collivaud	Merchantman	William Doxford & Sons	Sunderland	United Kingdom	For Morel Bros. & Co.
Unknown date	Comet	Steam lighter	Messrs. Scott & Co.	Bowling	United Kingdom	For Messrs. J. T. Salveson & Co.
Unknown date	Commentary	Merchantman	Osbourne, Graham & Co.	Sunderland	United Kingdom	For D'Orbigny & Faustin, Fils.
Unknown date	Danos	Merchantman	Joseph L. Thompson & Sons	Sunderland	United Kingdom	For Frederick Gordon & Co.
Unknown date	Dolcoath	Merchantman	James Laing	Sunderland	United Kingdom	For Osborn & Wallis.
Unknown date	Edmondsley	Merchantman	William Pickersgill & Sons	Sunderland	United Kingdom	For W. J. Branfoot.
Unknown date	El Almirante	Steam launch	Messrs. Cochran & Co.	Birkenhead	United Kingdom	For Messrs. Balfour, Williamson & Co.
Unknown date	Elirida	Steam yacht	Messrs. Ramage & Ferguson	Leith	United Kingdom	For F. Burnley.
Unknown date	Ellington	Merchantman	D. Baxter & Co.	Sunderland	United Kingdom	For Humble & Thompson.
Unknown date	Elysia	Steamship	Messrs. Thomas Royden & Sons	Liverpool	United Kingdom	For private owner.
Unknown date	Emperor	Tug	W. Allsup & Sons	Preston	United Kingdom	For Phillip Thomas.
Unknown date	Erie L. Hackley	Steamship	J. P. Arnold	Muskegon, Michigan	United States	For Henry Roberoy, E. T. Thorpe and Levi Joseph Vorous.
Unknown date	Erycina	Cutter	William Fife	Fairlie	United Kingdom	For Alexander Allen.
Unknown date	Falaba	Paddle steamer	Messrs. R. J. Evans & Co.	Liverpool	United Kingdom	For private owner.
Unknown date	Fayal	Steamship	Ross & Duncan	Govan	United Kingdom	For Portuguese Government.
Unknown date	Fei Lung	Merchantman	John Blumer and Company	Sunderland	United Kingdom	For W. Hewitt & Co.
Unknown date	Florence	Cutter	William Fife	Fairlie	United Kingdom	For J. G. Garrick Moore.
Unknown date	Forward	Revenue cutter	Pusey & Jones	Wilmington, Delaware	United States	For United States Revenue Cutter Service.
Unknown date	Foscolino	Steamship	William Pickersgill & Sons	Sunderland	United Kingdom	For Taylor and Sanderson Steam Shipping Company.
Unknown date	Gedeon	Steamship	Messrs. M'Intyre & Co	Paisley	United Kingdom	For Messrs. Pile & Co.
Unknown date	George A. Marsh	Schooner		Michigan City, Indiana	United States	For private owner.
Unknown date	George Smeed	Thames barge	Smeed-Dean & Co. Ltd.	Murston	United Kingdom	For Smeed-Dean & Co. Ltd.
Unknown date	George Wythes	Paddle steamer	W. Allsup & Sons	Preston	United Kingdom	For C. Morrison.
Unknown date	Georg Stage	Sailing ship	Burmeister & Wain	Copenhagen	Denmark	For private owner.
Unknown date	Gertrude	Merchantman	Joseph L. Thompson & Sons	Sunderland	United Kingdom	For Gordon & Stamp.
Unknown date	Glenfinlas	Merchantman	Sunderland Shipbuilding Company Limited	Sunderland	United Kingdom	For L. H. MacIntyre & Co.
Unknown date	Glenholme	Steamship	Messrs. Campbell, Mackintosh & Bowstead	Scotswood	United Kingdom	For Messrs. Culliford & Clark.
Unknown date	Glenorchy	Merchantman	Sunderland Shipbuilding Company, Limited	Sunderland	United Kingdom	For L. H. MacIntyre & Co.
Unknown date	Glenworth	Steamship	Messrs. Key & Son	Kinghorn	United Kingdom	For Australian Steam Navigation Company.
Unknown date	Godiva	Merchantman	Messrs. Thomas Royden & Sons	Liverpool	United Kingdom	For private owner.
Unknown date	Govino	Steamship	James Laing	Sunderland	United Kingdom	For D. G. Pinkney.
Unknown date	Grace Bailey	Schooner	Gilbert Smith	Patchogue, New York	United States	For Edwin Bailey.
Unknown date	Grassendale	Merchantman	Messrs. Williamson & Co.	Workington	United Kingdom	For Messrs. Leyland & Co.
Unknown date	Guyenne	Merchantman	John Blumer & Company	Sunderland	United Kingdom	For Delmas Frères & Co.
Unknown date	Handel	Merchantman	Bartram, Haswell, & Co.	Sunderland	United Kingdom	For Jenneson, Taylor & Co.
Unknown date	Hekla	Steamship	Kockums Mekaniska Werkstads Aktiebolag	Malmö	Sweden	For Dampskibs Selskabet Thingvalla.
Unknown date	Helmi II	Steam launch	Messrs. William Crichton & Co.	Åbo	(Russian Empire) Grand Duchy of Finland	For private owner.
Unknown date	Hercules	Tug	John H. Dialogue & Sons	Camden, New Jersey	United States	For private owner.
Unknown date	Highland Glen	Barque	Messrs. Ramage & Ferguson	Leith	United Kingdom	For Messrs. Crane, Colvill & Co.
Unknown date	Hopper No. 28	Hopper barge	The Strand Slipway Company	Sunderland	United Kingdom	For private owner.
Unknown date	Hopper No. 29	Hopper barge	The Strand Slipway Company	Sunderland	United Kingdom	For private owner.
Unknown date	Hopper No. 30	Hopper barge	The Strand Slipway Company	Sunderland	United Kingdom	For private owner.
Unknown date	Hopper No. 37	Hopper barge	The Strand Slipway Company	Sunderland	United Kingdom	For private owner.
Unknown date	Huelva	Merchantman	John Blumer & Co.	Sunderland	United Kingdom	For Scott Bros.
Unknown date	Hven	Steamship	Motala Verkstad	Lindholmens	Sweden	For Det Forenedi Dampskib Selskab.
Unknown date	Ilios	Merchantman	Short Bros.	Sunderland	United Kingdom	For Lumsdon, Byers & Co.
Unknown date	Isla de Luzon	Steamship	Messrs. Oswald, Mordaunt & Co.	Southampton	United Kingdom	For Compania General de Tabacos de Filipinas.
Unknown date	Jacamar	Steam yacht	Messrs. Barclay, Curle & Co.	Whiteinch	United Kingdom	For John Burns.
Unknown date	John M. Osborn	Steam barge	Morely & Hill	Marine City, Michigan	United States	For George F. Cleveland and Cleveland Mining Ore Company.
Unknown date	Kah-Byoo	Sternwheeler	Messrs. William Denny & Bros.	Dumbarton	United Kingdom	For Irrawaddy Flotilla Company.
Unknown date	Kahnee	Barge	Messrs. R. Duncan & Co.	Port Glasgow	United Kingdom	For Irrawaddy Flotilla Company.
Unknown date	Kairos	Merchantman	Joseph L. Thompson & Sons	Sunderland	United Kingdom	For Gordon & Stamp.
Unknown date	Kane	Paddle steamer	Messrs. D. J. Dunlop & Co.	Port Glasgow	United Kingdom	For National African Company (Limited).
Unknown date	Kawalirs	Steamship	Messrs. H. M'Intyre & Co.	Paisley	United Kingdom	For Westport Colliery Company.
Unknown date	Kirkmichael	Merchantman	William Doxford & Sons	Sunderland	United Kingdom	For J. Steel & Sons.
Unknown date	Kordoe	Paddle steamer	Messrs. T. B. Seath & Co.	Rutherg;en	United Kingdom	For Irrawaddy Flotilla Company.
Unknown date	Kronen	Steamship	Kockums Mekaniska Werkstad Aktiebolag	Malmö	Sweden	For Det Falster-Sjællandse Dampskibs-Skelskab.
Unknown date	Landwick	Thames barge	Peter Blaker	Crayford	United Kingdom	For Edward Rutter.
Unknown date	Lenore	Cutter	William Fife	Fairlie	United Kingdom	For James Grant.
Unknown date	Lily	Schooner	Dickie Bros	San Francisco, California	United States	For J. C. Hawley.
Unknown date	Linnæus	Tanker	Motala Verkstad	Lindholmens	Sweden	For Messrs. Nobel Bros.
Unknown date	Loch Bredan	Barque	Dobie & Co.	Govan	United Kingdom	For Sproat & Co.
Unknown date	Lockton	Steamship	Kish, Boolds & Co.	Pallion	United Kingdom	For J. B. Hick.
Unknown date	Lonsdale	Torpedo boat	John I. Thorneycroft & Company	Chiswick	United Kingdom	For Victorian Naval Forces.
Unknown date	Lyn	2.-class Torpedo boat			Norway	For Royal Norwegian Navy.
Unknown date	Madagascar	Merchantman	John Blumer & Co.	Sunderland	United Kingdom	For Cie Maurice Reunion.
Unknown date	Maine et Loire	Merchantman	William Doxford & Son	Sunderland	United Kingdom	For Cie Nantaise de Navigation à Vapeur.
Unknown date	Maritana	Merchantman	Joseph L. Thompson & Sons	Sunderland	United Kingdom	For Culliford & Clark.
Unknown date	Mararra	Paddle steamer	Messrs. W. Dickinson	Birkenhead	United Kingdom	For Messrs. H. Hershell & Co.
Unknown date	Mercuri	Steamship	Motala Verkstad	Lindholmens	Sweden	For Mr. Merkuhiff.
Unknown date	Meteor	Experimental steamship		Nyack, New York	United States	For private owner.
Unknown date	Meteor	Steam lighter	Messrs. Scott & Co.	Bowling	United Kingdom	For Messrs. J. T. Salveson & Co.
Unknown date	Mircea	Brig	Thames Iron Works	Leamouth	United Kingdom	For Romanian Flotilla Corps.
Unknown date	M.M. Drake	Steam barge	Union Dry Dock Company	Buffalo, New York	United States	For John Green.
Unknown date	Moowah	Barge	Messrs. R. Duncan & Co.	Port Glasgow	United Kingdom	For Irrawaddy Flotilla Company.
Unknown date	Montesano	Sternwheeler		Astoria, Oregon	United States	For Shoalwater Bay Transportation Company.
Unknown date	Moruca	Steamship	Messrs. J. & G. Thomson	Clydebank	United Kingdom	For Direct Line.
Unknown date	Mozart	Merchantman	North of England Shipbuilding Co.	Sunderland	United Kingdom	For J. Taylor.
Unknown date	Nepean	Torpedo boat	John I. Thorneycroft & Company	Chiswick	United Kingdom	For Victorian Naval Forces.
Unknown date	Neptune	Dredger	Messrs. William Simons & Co.	Renfrew	United Kingdom	For Lancashire and Yorkshire Railway.
Unknown date	Nerbudda	Steamship	Messrs. William Denny & Bros.	Dumbarton	United Kingdom	For British India Steam Navigation Company.
Unknown date	Obedient	Merchantman	Short Bros	Sunderland	United Kingdom	For James Westoll.
Unknown date	Olga	Tug	Messrs. William Crichton & Co.	Åbo	(Russian Empire) Grand Duchy of Finland	For private owner.
Unknown date	Orella	Merchantman	Messrs. Thomas Royden & Sons	Liverpool	United Kingdom	For private owner.
Unknown date	Oriental	Steamship	Messrs. A. & J. Inglis	Pointhouse	United Kingdom	For P. Mackinnon.
Unknown date	Orowaiti	Steamship	Messrs. H. M'Intyre & Co.	Paisley	United Kingdom	For Westport Colliery Company.
Unknown date	Orpington	Merchantman	Joseph L. Thompson & Sons	Sunderland	United Kingdom	For Frederick Gordon & Co.
Unknown date	Ousel	Steamship	Messrs. David Rollo & Sons	Liverpool	United Kingdom	For Cork Steamship Company.
Unknown date	Ozernoi	Steamship	Motala Verkstad	Norrköping	Sweden	For Imperial Russian Government.
Unknown date	Pacaxo	Steamship	London and Glasgow Shipbuilding Company	Glasgow	United Kingdom	For private owner.
Unknown date	Parabyba	Steamship	W. B. Thompson	Whiteinch	United Kingdom	For Messrs. Fry, Miers & Co.
Unknown date	Piqua	Steamship	Messrs. Thomas Roydon & Sons	Liverpool	United Kingdom	For private owner.
Unknown date	Port Pirrie	Steamship	Messrs. T. B. Seath & Co.	Rutherglen	United Kingdom	For A. Wilson.
Unknown date	Powa	Barge	Messrs. R. Duncan & Co.	Port Glasgow	United Kingdom	For Irrawaddy Flotilla Company.
Unknown date	Precursor	Steam fishing smack	Cook, Welton & Gemmell Ltd.	Hull	United Kingdom	For private owner.
Unknown date	Pologna	Barqge	Messrs. T. B. Seath & Co.	Rutherglen	United Kingdom	For Irrawaddy Flotilla Company.
Unknown date	President Garfield	Steamship	Messrs. W. Hamilton & Co.	Port Glasgow	United Kingdom	For private owner.
Unknown date	Prinz Albrecht	Merchantman	Short Bros.	Sunderland	United Kingdom	For Dampschiffahrts Gesellschaft Anglia.
Unknown date	Prinz Leopold	Merchantman	Short Bros.	Sunderland	United Kingdom	For Dampschiffahrts Gesellschaft Anglia.
Unknown date	Ranger	Motorboat	T. A. Scott Company	New London, Connecticut	United States	For private owner.
Unknown date	Ready	Steamship	Messrs. H. M'Intyre & Co	Paisley	United Kingdom	For Messrs. Pile & Co.
Unknown date	Rimpha	Merchantman	Sunderland Shipbuilding Company, Limited	Sunderland	United Kingdom	For R. Gordon & Co.
Unknown date	River Avon	Steamship	Messrs. H. M'Intyre & Co.	Paisley, Renfrewshire	United Kingdom	For Messrs. James Little & Co.
Unknown date	Roanoke	Cargo liner	Delaware River Iron Shipbuilding and Engine Works	Chester, Pennsylvania	United States	For Old Dominion Steamship Company.
Unknown date	Rugia	Steamship	AG Vulcan	Stettin	Germany	For Hamburg-Amerikanische Packetfahrt-Actien-Gesellschaft.
Unknown date	Salamanca	Merchantman	Joseph L. Thompson & Sons	Sunderland	United Kingdom	For Henry Scholefield & Son.
Unknown date	Sarthe	Merchantman	William Doxford & Sons	Sunderland	United Kingdom	For Cie Nantaise de Navigation à Vapeur.
Unknown date	Sedhat	Barge	Messrs. R. Duncan & Co.	Port Glasgow	United Kingdom	For Irrawaddy Flotilla Company.
Unknown date	Selembria	Merchantman	Robert Thompson & Sons	Sunderland	United Kingdom	For Crow, Rudolf & Co.
Unknown date	Sister	Tug			United States	For private owner.
Unknown date	S. J. Oteri	Steamship	Messrs. Raylton Dixon & Co.	Middlesbrough	United Kingdom	For Messrs. Oteri & Co.
Unknown date	Sophia	Steam yacht			United States	For private owner.
Unknown date	Spindrift	Yacht			United States	For private owner.
Unknown date	Star of the Sea	Schooner	Messrs. Ramage & Ferguson	Leith	United Kingdom	For Duke of Norfolk.
Unknown date	Strabing	Barge	Messrs. T. B. Seath & Co.	Rutherglen	United Kingdom	For Irrawaddy Flotilla Company.
Unknown date	Strathcarron	Steamship	Messrs. Dobson & Charles	Grangemouth	United Kingdom	For Messrs. James Hay & Sons.
Unknown date	Strathendrick	Merchantman	Troon Shipbuilding Company	Troon	United Kingdom	For Messrs. D. M'Gregor & Co.
Unknown date	Stronsa	Merchantman	Messrs. Thomas Royden & Sons	Liverpool	United Kingdom	For private owner.
Unknown date	St. Thomas	Steamship	W. B. Thompson	Whiteinch	United Kingdom	For Arbroath and London Steamship Company.
Unknown date	Sunbeam	Steamship	Messrs. Cochran & Co.	Birkenhead	United Kingdom	For Messrs. Richards, Power & Co.
Unknown date	Talavera	Merchantman	Messrs. Birrell, Stenhouse & Co.	Dumbarton	United Kingdom	For Messrs. John Hardy & Co.
Unknown date	Trignac	Merchantman	Osbourne, Graham & Co.	Sunderland	United Kingdom	For D'Orbigny & Faustin, Fils.
Unknown date	Troutbeck	Merchantman	Priestman & Co	Sunderland	United Kingdom	For Fisher, Renwick & Co.
Unknown date	Victoria	Merchantman	Short Bros.	Sunderland	United Kingdom	For J. W. Taylor.
Unknown date	Viking	Sealer	Nylands Verksted	Kristiania	Norway	For private owner.
Unknown date	Viking	Steamship	Lindholmen Mekaniska Verkstad	Gothenburg	Sweden	For J. C. Gjertsen.
Unknown date	Ville de Malaga	Steamship	John Blumer & Co.	Sunderland	United Kingdom	For Compagnie Havraise Peninsulaire Navigation à Vapeur.
Unknown date	Ville de Suances	Steam launch	Ross & Duncan	Glasgow	United Kingdom	For private owners.
Unknown date	Volta	Steamship	London and Glasgow Shipbuilding Company	Glasgow	United Kingdom	For private owner.
Unknown date	W. F. Babcock	Schooner	A Sewall & Co.	Bath, Maine	United States	For private owner.
Unknown date	X	Steam lighter	Messrs. Scott & Co.	Bowling	United Kingdom	For Messrs. James Currie & Co.
Unknown date	Y	Steam lighter	Messrs. Scott & Co.	Bowling	United Kingdom	For Messrs. James Currie & Co.
Unknown date	Yokah	Barge	Messrs. T. B. Seath & Co.	Rutherglen	United Kingdom	For Irrawaddy Flotilla Company.
Unknown date	Yone	Barge	Messrs. T. B. Seath & Co.	Rutherglen	United Kingdom	For Irrawaddy Flotilla Company.
Unknown date	Zakynthos	Merchantman	Robert Thompson & Sons	Sunderland	United Kingdom	For G. Stathopulo.
Unknown date	No. 216	Steam launch	Messrs. T. B. Seath & Co.	Rutherglen	United Kingdom	For Messrs. J. Finlay & Co.
Unknown date	No. 228	Steamship	London and Glasgow Shipbuilding Company	Glasgow	United Kingdom	For private owner.
Unknown date	Unnamed	Steamship	Campbeltown Shipbuilding Company	Campbeltown	United Kingdom	For Haytor Mining Company (Limited).
