= SS Norseman =

SS Norseman is the name of the following ships:

- SS Norseman (blockade runner), a blockade runner that struck the wreck of the blockade runner Georgiana and sank 19 May 1863
- SS Norseman (1864), launched 7 May 1864
- SS Norseman (1882), launched 31 August 1882
- SS Norseman (1883), launched November 1883, ran aground on 21 December 1916
- SS Norseman (1897), torpedoed by SM U-39 on 22 January 1916 and beached, subsequently scrapped

== See also ==
- HMS Norseman
- Norseman (disambiguation)
