= Norseman (disambiguation) =

A Norseman is a member of a North Germanic ethnolinguistic group of the Early Middle Ages.

Norseman may also refer to:

- Chrysler Norseman, a 1956 concept car, lost in the sinking of the Andrea Doria
- Norseman, Western Australia
  - Norseman Gold Mine, a gold mine in Western Australia
- Noorduyn Norseman, a piston-engine airplane
- Norseman triathlon, a long distance triathlon sports competition
- The Norseman, a 1978 American film starring Lee Majors
- The Norseman, a fictional device created by Alexei Volkoff in the TV series Chuck
- HMS Norseman, a Royal Navy destroyer
- SS Norseman, various steamships

Norsemen may also refer to:

- Norsemen (TV series), a 2016–2020 Norwegian comedy series
- Norsemen F.C., a football club based in Edmonton, England

== See also ==
- Norse (disambiguation)
- Northman (disambiguation)
- Northmen (disambiguation)
