= Northman =

Northman may refer to:

- Northman, a term for a Scandinavian or viking c.800 to c.1100
- Northman of Escomb (fl. 994), a Northumbrian earl
- Northman, son of Leofwine (died 1017), Mercian thegn
- Edith Northman, American architect
- Eric Northman, a character in The Southern Vampire Mysteries
- Pam Northman, better known as Pamela Swynford De Beaufort, a character in The Southern Vampire Mysteries
- The Northman, a 2022 American epic historical action drama film by Robert Eggers

== See also ==
- Norsemen
- Norseman (disambiguation)
- Northmen (disambiguation)
