= John Winspear =

Shipbuilder

John Winspear (1816 – 1874) was a ship builder in Hartlepool, England.

== Life and career ==
Born in Whitby in 1816 John Winspear set up his business in Hartlepool. Based in Middleton, Winspear's yard boasted a gridiron and patent slipway.

In an advertisement, Winspear described himself as a "shipwright, blacksmith", saying he was "always in readiness for raising sunken ships, and getting them off when stranded."

Winspear was known for his workmanship and he built five wooden sailing ships, mostly small vessels, the last being the 55.5ft schooner Ellis, launched in 1858.

Winspear was afflicted by poor mental health and died in 1874 in the County Asylum.
