= Northmen (disambiguation) =

Northmen or Norsemen are the group of people as a whole who speak one of the North Germanic languages as their native language.

Northmen may also refer to:

- Northmen (Middle-earth), a fictional people from J. R. R. Tolkien's Middle-earth
- Northmen (Dungeons & Dragons), a fictional people from Dungeons & Dragons
- Northmen: A Viking Saga, a 2014 film
- Quebec Nordiques, the English translation of Nordiques is Northmen

== See also ==
- Northman (disambiguation)
- Norseman (disambiguation)
