= SB George Smeed =

Thames sailing barge built in 1882

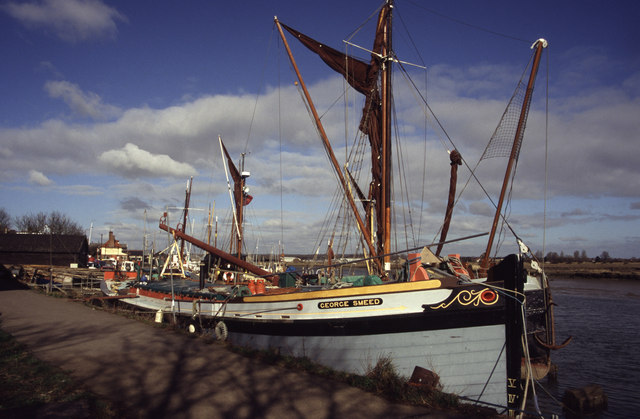
- George Smeed in Maldon in 2005

History

United Kingdom
- Name: George Smeed
- Builder: Smeed-Dean Co Ltd (Murston)
- Yard number: 83340
- Commissioned: 1882
- Status: Private use and private charter ship

General characteristics
- Tonnage: 59 rebuilt 64
- Propulsion: Sails and auxiliary diesel engine
- Crew: 2
- Notes: Wood

George Smeed is a Thames barge built in 1882 by Smeed Dean & Co. Ltd. in Murston.

== Name ==
The barge is named after the Sittingbourne entrepreneur, George Smeed (1812–1881) who began business in 1846 in Murston. The building of Victorian London created a vast demand for bricks. The yellow Kent Stock Brick which was cheaper to make than the more traditional red brick; Sittingbourne had the brickearth needed to make them, and easy access to the Swale and the London River. By 1860 he owned expanding brickfields, shipyards along the creek and barges. The business traded as Smeed-Dean Co Ltd until 1926 when it was sold.

== Owners ==
- 1882 Built for Smeed Dean & Co. Ltd.
- Passing to A.P.C.M.
- 1922 Rebuilt at 64 ton,
- Francis & Gilders
- Browns for lighterage.
- 1970s housebarge at Heybridge
- 1980 onwards Ken and Carol Greenhalgh for renovation
- 2017 Rebuilt and rerigged

Based at Maldon owned by Carol Greenhalgh.

== Description ==
She was built in 1881 [registered in 1882] in Murston Sittingbourne by Smeed Dean for their personal use. This meant she was a brick barge destined to take bricks from Sittingbourne or Snodland to London, and towns along the Kent and Essex coast. She was rated at 58 tons, and would carry a cargo of 110 GRT tons (the unit of volume). She was deep and did not have raised hatches or a raised cabin. She was steered with a tiller. Her compass was kept under the glass cabin hatch, so it could be seen from within and without. In 1922 she was rebuilt as a 64-ton vessel that could carry a 150 GRT tons cargo. However, she kept her original rigging and was under-canvased for this size of vessel, and very light headed, in that small corrections on the helm could cause large and unpredictable changes of course. By 1949 she was sailing with a crew of two, but earlier she had a skipper, a mate and a boy who acted as cook and tended the lamps. Her cabin was entered directly down a vertical ladder, though in later times, a wall was added to act as a vestible where the wet oilskins could be left. With a three-man crew, the cooking was done in the fo'castle where the boy had his berth. She was spritsail rigged and had a bowsprit that would be topped in the harbours or along the quays.

Although normally employed in the Thames, its estuary and adjoining rivers, she did venture further afield on occasions. Hedley Farrington recalls one voyage in the mid 1920s from Sittingbourne to Devonport in company with SB Gertrude May. They were loaded with cement. It was winter time and the voyage lasted three months.

== Typical passage ==
Hervey Benham describes a typical passage on board the George Smeed in 1949 from Colchester to Gravesend. The passage is reliant on the speed and direction of the wind, and the depth and flow of the tidal river. He leaves Colchester on a Saturday afternoon, and the barge is pulled into the River Colne by a small motor launch. The hatches are fixed and first sail to be raised is the topsail then their boat is attached to the davits; this is the difference between a coastal barge and an inland barge. This is all done before passing Wivenhoe. The mainsail is dropped and set by the Alresford Woods. The launch casts off and seeks another tow. About 4.00 pm, the sails are set for a starboard tack- then the bowsprit with the jib attached to the stay is dropped and secured, the jib topsail is now set. The stays have to trimmed to re-establish balance, and the foresail, jib and jib-topsail sheeted. It is approaching high water when George Smeed edges out of the Colne, under the lee of East Mersea Point with the Bradwell shore to windward, and heads for the Bench Head Buoy (Note: At the junction of the Rivers Colne and Blackwater) [51°44.61′N 01°01.50′E (Note: The banks and channels in the Thames estuary move, and the buoys are moved accordingly. The coordinates shown are those on cited charts, in 1949 they may have been in a slightly different position)]. As the wind was SSW, and they took the unmarked channel between the Knoll and the Whitaker- this was known as the West Spitway [51°42.50′N 01°08.05′E (Note: Now marked by the Wallet Spitway and Swin Spitway buoys)] in 1801, they lowered the leeboard to act as a watchdog as they sailed over this shallow water, if it had bumped the bottom a chain would create some noise. They passed into the darker water and thus deeper water of the Whitaker Channel. They prepared themselves for the night, by rounding her into the wind, brailed her mainsail and the foresail slid down the mast, fifteen fathoms of chain was paid out and the anchor bit into the sand. Close by was the Whitaker buoy[51°44.15′N 01°10.55′E] and to the south was the Swin and the Barrow Deep. The topsail sheet was let go, clewlines secured and the vang falls hardened on the quarter crab winches. The ebb flow finished and the rain arrived. All secured it was down to the cabin and the cooking stove.

In the morning, time was spent tidying up the rigging which had been displaced for the previous cargo of timber. The chains spanning the hold had to be shackled up- as they had been released; these prevent the hull from splaying Barges are designed to have a long hold which is a structural weakness if the hold is not kept in tension. In that time it had moved a full inch. Rather later than was wise, the anchor was raised; it was slack water and the George Smeed did not get the advantage of the ebb tide to pull her to windward so she was put on a starboard tack to get onto the Maplins to get away from the full tide in the main channel. She went over the Middle Deep, to within a couple of cables length from the Barrow [beacon at 51°37.15′N 01°07.15′E]. Round she came, as jib, jib topsail, and foresail were let fly; the moment is used to trim the jib topsail sheet and she set off south-westerly to the Sheers, (the point on the Maplin [Bank] where the Sheers lighthouse had stood [near 51°35.50′N 01°04.60′E]). She tacked three times by the Blacktail Spit [51°31.45′N 00°56.78′E] before joining the [Yantlet] channel. (Note: The main channel up the Thames) She passed the Nore, where the lightship had stood before being replaced by the forts. Medway was to windward and Southend to leeward. As the breeze strengthened, the topmast became whippy so the Jib topsail was dropped and stowed at the end of the bowsprit. She sailed all of Sea Reach, and a mile into the Gravesend Reach before anchoring for the night.

The Monday, the start was at 5 am, the anchor didn't come up easily, and the sails were set. This time the bowsprit was topped and the jib-topsail was rehanked to the stemhead becoming a staysail. There was still little wind. To come up to the tier, a boomie would anchor up wind and drift in, but the George Smeed came in under sail from the leeward and crept to the tier. The anchor is lowered. Then 'Down foresail', 'Down tops'l', which must be lowered before it is sheeted. The voyage was over and the George Smeed loaded its next cargo of potash.
