= SS Nubia (1882) =

History
- Name: Nubia
- Owner: Anchor Line, Glasgow
- Builder: D & W Henderson & Co Ltd, Meadowside, Clydeside, Glasgow (United Kingdom)
- Yard number: 232
- Launched: 1882
- Identification: 86709
- Fate: Acquired by Cia de Comercio e Navegacao, Rio De Janeiro, Brazil in 1906 and renamed SS São Luiz

History
- Name: SS São Luiz
- Owner: Cia de Comercio e Navegacao, Rio De Janeiro (Brazil)
- Acquired: 1906
- Fate: Ran aground and wrecked on 11 January 1911

General characteristics
- Type: Cargo ship
- Tonnage: 3,551 GRT
- Length: 112.4 m (369 ft)
- Beam: 12 m (39 ft)
- Draught: 8.7 m (29 ft)
- Installed power: 2-cylinder compound engine providing 480 horsepower (360 kW)
- Speed: 14 kn (26 km/h; 16 mph)

The Nubia was a cargo ship built in 1882 by D. & W. Henderson & Co. Ltd. of Meadowside, Clydeside, Glasgow and operated by Anchor Line Ltd of Glasgow. It measured 112.4 metres (369 ft) by 12 metres (39 ft) with a top speed of 14 knots. In 1906 it was sold to Cia de Comercio e Navegacao of Rio de Janeiro and renamed SS São Luiz. The ship ran aground on 10 January 1911 off the coast of Rio Grande do Norte in Brazil.
