= Middleton, Hartlepool =

Area of Hartlepool, County Durham, England

Coordinates: 54.693°N 1.1954°W

Middleton
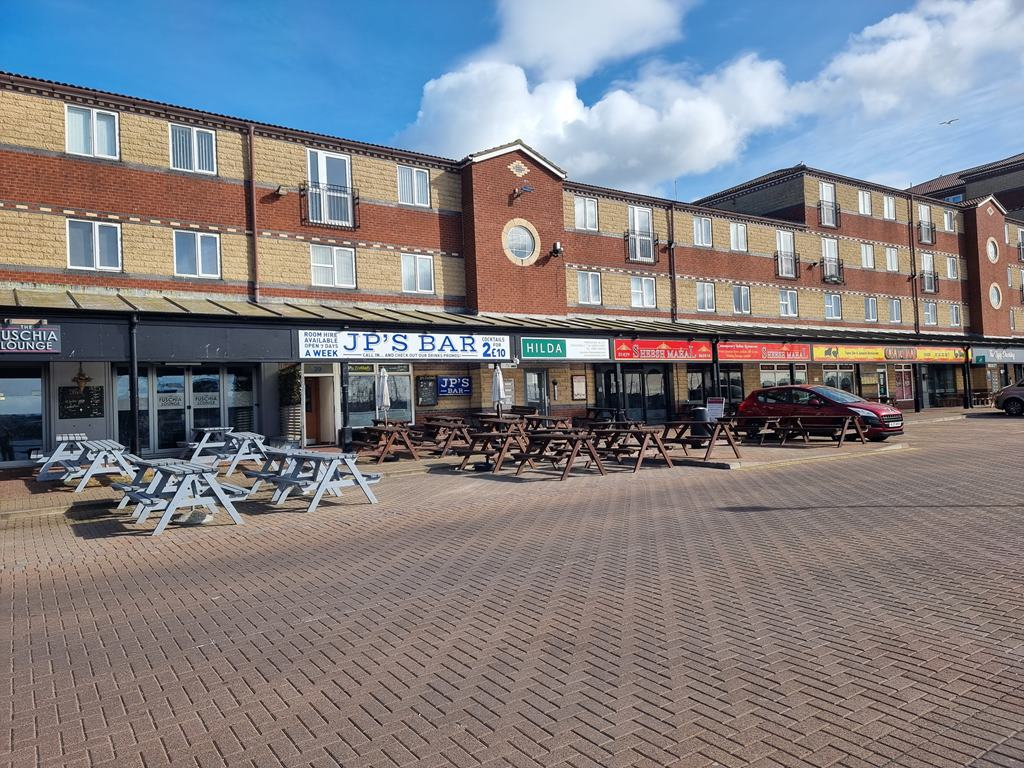
- The shops overlooking the Marina

- Location within County Durham
- Unitary authority: Hartlepool
- Ceremonial county: Durham
- Region: North East
- Country: England
- Sovereign state: United Kingdom

Middleton is an area of Hartlepool, in the Borough of Hartlepool, County Durham, England. It is on the North Sea coast between the centre of Hartlepool and The Headland.

== History and Etymology ==
The area takes its name from a wealthy Wesleyan.

In the medieval era it has long been believed to have served as part of both the sea and military defence for the harbour. However, as Hartlepool went into decline Middleton gradually lost its significance; by the late 18th century half of neighbouring Victoria and Commissioners Harbour was recorded as being half-filled in and used as a cornfield.

In the early 19th century, Hartlepool's fate changed as the town began to industrialise, and the Grays, the Swansons, and the Jacksons began investing in the new docks that would emerge to the South, as the Dyke House Marshes were drained. Gradually Middleton re-emerged becoming more or less an island, in the centre of the new dockyards. Due to its prominent position, it seemed for some to be the ideal place to establish shipyards. A number of shipyards existed at Middleton including those of John Punshon Denton, John Winspear, Alexander Withy, William Gray & Co., Dring & Pattison and Thomas Richardson. At its height in the late 19th century, the area had three shipyards and two engineering works based in Middleton. Middleton was a community in its own right, consisting of three streets of terraced houses and a number of pubs. It was also home to a "Rocket House" which was used for signalling ships.

In the 1940s, this area of Hartlepool was home to many decommissioned or mothballed Royal Navy ships, as well as ships of Axis powers, waiting to be refitted or dismantled. These included one of Adolf Hitler's yachts.

From the end of the Second World War the dockyards in Hartlepool gradually fell into decline, partly due to the moving of several key industries, the declines in export of coal. For Middleton it was particularly hard hit by a decline, in the commission of ships built in British shipyards, as well as the fact much of the Dockyards at Hartlepool were gradually considered unsuitable for the modern container ships (until the improvements made to Central Dock, which now serves as the main port of the town). This and a combination of the highly polluted, dirty and derelict environment of Middleton, gradually led to the site's depopulation, to a point where by the late 1980s the only inhabited part was a surviving pub. Most of the buildings with the exception of several derelict buildings, mainly belonging to the Engineering Works, warehouses and the modern buildings of Greys Shipyards, had been demolished.

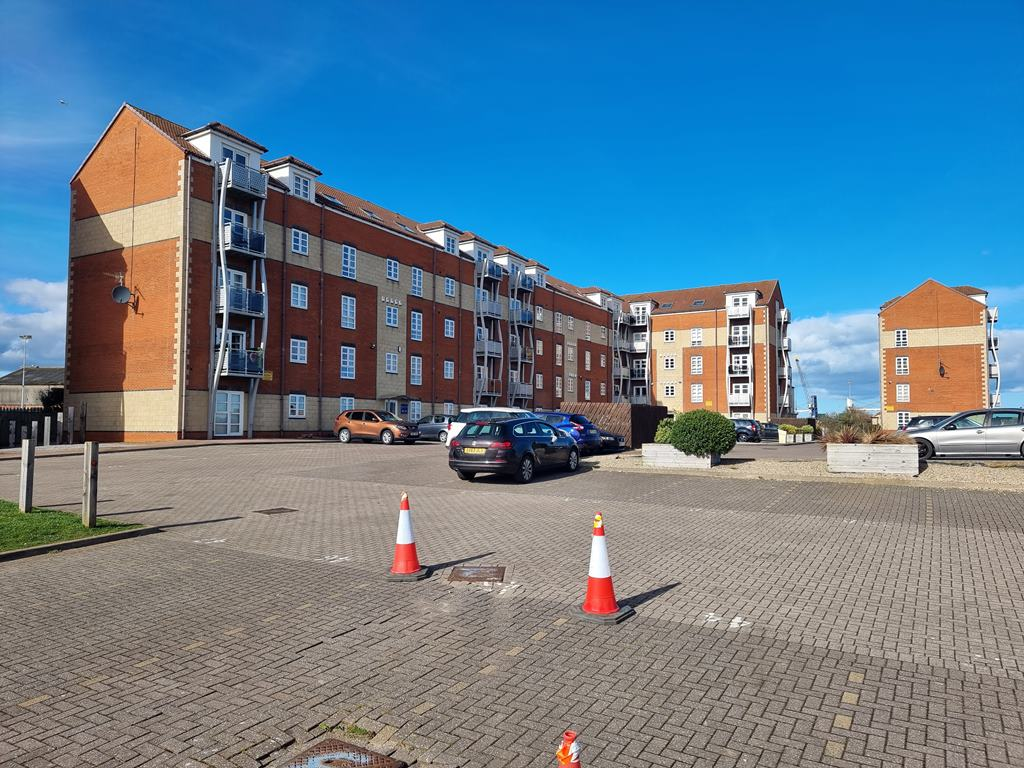
The apartments

Since 2003 a series of new apartments have been completed, which roughly cover the site of the terrace houses.

== Governance ==
Middleton was added as a Local Board District in the Hartlepool Borough in 1883.

On 31 December 1894 Middleton became a civil parish, being formed from the part of Stranton in Hartlepool municipal borough, on 1 April 1936 the parish was abolished and merged with Hartlepool. In 1931 the parish had a population of 16,808. It is now in the unparished area of Hartlepool.
