= HMS Norseman =

British M-Class destroyer

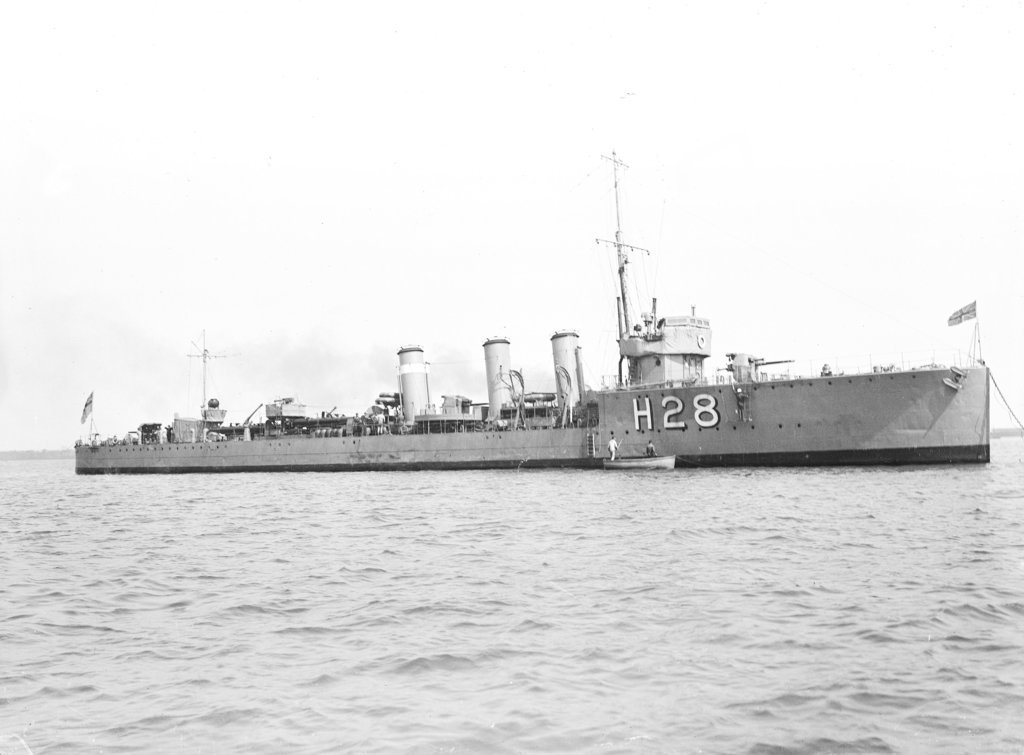
- Sister ship HMS Orpheus in 1918

History

United Kingdom
- Name: HMS Norseman
- Ordered: February 1915
- Builder: Doxford, Sunderland
- Launched: 15 August 1916
- Completed: November 1916
- Out of service: 9 May 1921
- Fate: Sold to be broken up

General characteristics
- Class & type: Admiralty M-class destroyer
- Displacement: 985 long tons (1,001 t) (normal); 1,021 long tons (1,037 t) (full load)
- Length: 265 ft (81 m) (p.p.)
- Beam: 26 ft 8 in (8 m)
- Draught: 8 ft 11 in (3 m)
- Installed power: 3 Yarrow boilers, 25,000 shp (19,000 kW)
- Propulsion: Brown-Curtis steam turbines, 3 shafts
- Speed: 34 knots (63.0 km/h; 39.1 mph)
- Range: 2,530 nmi (4,690 km; 2,910 mi) at 15 kn (28 km/h; 17 mph)
- Complement: 80
- Armament: 3 × single QF 4-inch (102 mm) Mark IV guns; 1 × single 2-pdr 40 mm (2 in) AA gun; 2 × twin 21 in (533 mm) torpedo tubes

HMS Norseman was a Repeat Admiralty M-class destroyer which served in the Royal Navy during the First World War. The M class were an improvement on the previous L-class, capable of higher speed. The vessel was launched in 1916 and joined the Grand Fleet. Norseman joined the Thirteenth Destroyer Flotilla which, in 1917, participated in a large anti-submarine warfare operation in the North Sea. The sortie led to three German submarines being sunk, although Norseman was not directly involved in these attacks. In 1918, the flotilla was involved in one of the final sorties of the Grand Fleet, but again the destroyer saw no action at the time. After the Armistice that marked the end of the First World War, Norseman was placed in reserve, decommissioned and, in 1921, sold to be broken up.

== Design and development ==
Norseman was one of sixteen Repeat Admiralty M-class destroyer destroyers ordered by the British Admiralty in February 1915 as part of the Fourth War Construction Programme. The M-class was an improved version of the earlier L-class destroyers, required to reach a higher speed in order to counter rumoured German fast destroyers. The remit was to have a maximum speed of 36 knots (67 km/h; 41 mph) and, although the eventual design did not achieve this, the greater performance was appreciated by the navy. It transpired that the German ships did not exist. The Repeat M class differed from the prewar vessels in having a raked stem and design improvements based on wartime experience.

The destroyer had a length of 265 ft (80.8 m) between perpendiculars and 273 ft 4 in (83.3 m) overall, with a beam of 26 ft 8 in (8.1 m) and draught of 8 ft 11 in (2.7 m). Normal displacement was 985 long tons (1,001 t) and 1,021 long tons (1,037 t) at full load. Power was provided by three Yarrow boilers feeding Brown-Curtis steam turbines rated at 25,000 shaft horsepower (19,000 kW), driving three shafts and exhausting through three funnels. Design speed was 34 knots (63 km/h; 39 mph). A total of 228 long tons (232 t) of oil was carried, which gave a design range of 2,530 nautical miles (4,690 km; 2,910 mi) at 15 knots (28 km/h; 17 mph). The ship had a complement of 80 officers and ratings.

Norseman had an armament that included three single QF 4-inch (102 mm) Mk IV guns on the centreline, with one on the forecastle, one aft on a raised platform and one between the middle and aft funnels. Torpedo armament consisted of two twin torpedo tubes for 21 in (533 mm) torpedoes located aft of the funnels. One single 2-pdr 40 mm (1.6 in) "pom-pom" anti-aircraft gun was carried. The destroyer was fitted with racks and storage for depth charges. Initially, only two depth charges were carried but the number increased in service and by 1918, the vessel was carrying between 30 and 50 depth charges.

== Construction and career ==
Laid down at their shipyard in Sunderland, Norseman was launched by William Doxford & Sons on 15 August 1916 and completed during November the same year. The destroyer was the first Royal Navy ship to bear the name. On commissioning, Norseman was deployed as part of the Grand Fleet, joining the Thirteenth Destroyer Flotilla based at Rosyth. Between 1 and 10 October 1917, the flotilla took part in a large exercise to detect and trap German submarines in the North Sea. Although Norseman was not directly involved, three enemy boats were sunk in the operation. The flotilla took part in the Royal Navy's engagement with one of the final sorties of the German High Seas Fleet during the First World War, on 24 April 1918, although the two fleets did not actually meet and the destroyer saw no action.

After the Armistice that ended the war on 11 November 1918, the Royal Navy returned to a peacetime level of strength and both the number of ships and personnel needed to be reduced to save money. Norseman was placed in reserve with a reduced company on 15 March 1919. The harsh conditions of wartime service, exacerbated by the fact that the hull was not galvanised and operations often required high speed in high seas, meant that the destroyer was worn out and ready for retirement. Norseman was decommissioned, and sold to Thos. W. Ward at Grays, on 9 May 1921 to be broken up.

== Pennant numbers ==
Pennant number	Date
G70	September 1915
F13	January 1917
F06	January 1918
G51	March 1918
H22	November 1918
F82	January 1919
