= List of ship launches in 1886 =

The list of ship launches in 1886 includes a chronological list of some ships launched in 1886.

Date	Ship	Class	Builder	Location	Country	Notes
2 January	Azalea	Steamship	Sunderland Shipbuilding Co. Ltd	Sunderland	United Kingdom	For Leach & Co.
4 January	Bawean	Steamship	James Laing	Sunderland	United Kingdom	For Nederlandse Indische Stoomvaart Maatschappij.
5 January	La Gascoigne	Steamship	Forges et Chantiers de la Mediterranee	La Seyne	France	For Compagnie Générale Transatlantique.
5 January	Iran	Cargo ship	Harland & Wolff	Belfast	United Kingdom	For Edward Bates & Son.
6 January	Amherst	Steamship	Messrs. Blackwood & Gordon	Port Glasgow	United Kingdom	For Messrs. Bow, M'Lachlan & Co.
6 January	Ventura	Merchantman	Messrs. A. M'Millan & Son	Dumbarton	United Kingdom	For Scotia Shipping Company.
9 January	Ada and Ethel	Schooner	Mr. Roderick	Eagleton	New South Wales	For Edward Davies & Charles Frederick Messell.
11 January	Samoa	Barque	Messsrs. Russell & Co.	Cartsdyke	United Kingdom	For Messrs. P. Dennistoun & Co.
15 January	Racer	Tug	Boolds, Sharer & Co.	Pallion	United Kingdom	For Queenstown Screw Tug & Shipping Co. Ltd.
18 January	Unnamed	Steam fishing trawler	Earle's Shipbuilding and Engineering Co., Limited	Hull	United Kingdom	For Boston Deep Sea Fishing and Ice Co, Limited.
18 January	Unnamed	Steam fishing trawler	Earle's Shipbuilding and Engineering Co., Limited	Hull	United Kingdom	For Boston Deep Sea Fishing and Ice Co, Limited.
19 January	Earl of Jersey	Paddle tug	Joseph T. Eltringham	South Shields	United Kingdom	For Messrs. Martin & Marquand.
19 January	Ferdinand Fischer	Full-rigged ship	Flensburger Schiffbau-Gesellschaft	Flensburg	Germany	For T. D. Bischoff.
19 January	Landrail	Curlew-class gunvessel		Devonport Dockyard	United Kingdom	For Royal Navy.
20 January	Eskasoni	Full-rigged ship	Messrs. Richardson, Duck & Co.	Stockton-on-Tees	United Kingdom	For Messrs. T. & E. Kenney.
20 January	Hubbuck	Steamship	Joseph L. Thompson & Sons	Monkwearmouth	United Kingdom	For W. Lund.
21 January	Dalmazia	Steamship	John Knox & Co.	South Hylton	United Kingdom	For M. Sverljuga & Co.
21 January	Loch Etive	Steamship	Messrs. Gourlay Bros. & Co.	Dundee	United Kingdom	For Loch Line Steam Shipping Company.
21 January	Monmouthshire	Steamship	London & Glasgow Engineering and Iron Shipbuilding Company (Limited)	Govan	United Kingdom	For Messrs. Jenkins & Co.
21 January	Saint Oswald	Steamship	Sir W. G. Armstrong, Mitchell & Co.	Low Walker	United Kingdom	For Messrs. Rankin, Gilmour & Co.
21 January	Unnamed	Steamship	Messrs. A. & J. Inglis	Pointhouse	United Kingdom	For Messrs A. & J. Inglis. Later named Palitana.
22 January	Lowther Castle	Merchantman	Messrs. R. Williamson & Son	Workington	United Kingdom	For Lancaster Shipowners Company.
January	Freiston	Steam trawler	Earle's Shipbuilding & Engineering Co., Limited	Hull	United Kingdom	For Boston Deep Sea Fishing and Ice Co., Limited.
January	Gascoyne	Steamship		La Seyne-sur-Mer	France	For Compagnie Générale Transatlantique.
January	Skirbeck	Steam trawler	Earle's Shipbuilding & Engineering Co., Limited	Hull	United Kingdom	For Boston Deep Sea Fishing and Ice Co., Limited.
4 February	Adventure	Steamship	Messrs. John Readhead & Sons	South Shields	United Kingdom	For Messrs. Robert Harrowing & Co.
4 February	Lindisfarne	Merchantman	Messrs. Richardson, Duck & Co.	Stockton-on-Tees	United Kingdom	For Messrs. John Lidgett & Sons.
4 February	Maria P.	Steamship	Sunderland Shipbuilding Co. Ltd.	Sunderland	United Kingdom	For Angelo Profum fuG.
4 February	Stromboli	Etna-class cruiser	Venetian Arsenal	Venice	Italy	For Regia Marina.
5 February	Coomonderry	Steamship	Messrs. T. B. Seath & Co.	Rutherglen	United Kingdom	For John Hay.
6 February	Alcides	Steamship	Messrs. Napier, Shanks & Bell	Yoker	United Kingdom	For Messrs. Donaldson Bros.
6 February	Andrina	Merchantman	Messrs. Oswald, Mordaunt & Co.	Southampton	United Kingdom	For G. W. Roberts.
6 February	Barnsley	Tug	Messrs. Head & Riley	Hull	United Kingdom	For Hull and Barnsley Railway and Dock Company.
6 February	Cleveland	Steamship	Messrs. W. Gray & Co.	West Hartlepool	United Kingdom	For Henry Fell Pease
6 February	Mohawk	Archer-class torpedo cruiser	J. & G. Thompson	Glasgow	United Kingdom	For Royal Navy.
6 February	Remus	Steam trawler	Messrs. Cochrane & Son	Beverley	United Kingdom	For Messrs. Pickering & Haldane.
6 February	Salamander	Steam drifter	Messrs. A. G. Gifford & Co.	Leith	United Kingdom	For private owner.
8 February	Olaf Kyrre	Steamship	Messrs. Martens, Olsen & Co.	Bergen	Norway	For private owner.
8 February	Star of Austria	East Indiaman	Messrs. Workman, Clarke & Co.	Belfast	United Kingdom	For Messrs. J. P. Corry & Co.
9 February	Fishtoft	Steam trawler	Messrs. Earle's Shipbuilding & Engineering Co., Limited	Hull	United Kingdom	For Boston Deep Sea Fishing and Ice Co. Ltd.
9 February	Frampton	Steam trawler	Messrs. Earle's Shipbuilding & Engineering Co., Limited	Hull	United Kingdom	For Boston Deep Sea Fishing and Ice Co. Ltd.
16 February	Highland Home	Barque	Messrs. Ramage & Ferguson	Leith	United Kingdom	For Messrs. Crane, Colville & Co.
17 February	Anson	Admiral-class battleship		Pembroke Dockyard	United Kingdom	For Royal Navy.
18 February	Assistance	Steamship	Messrs. J. M'Arthur & Co.	Abbotsinch	United Kingdom	For Messrs. Dick, Kerr & Co.
18 February	Mandalay	Steamship	Messrs. Thomas Turnbull & Son	Whitby	United Kingdom	For Messts. Thomas Turnbull & Son.
18 February	Violet	Steam yacht and trawler	Messrs. Ramage & Ferguson	Leith	United Kingdom	For Lord Alfred Paget.
18 February	Unnamed	Steamship	Fairfield Shipbuilding and Engineering Company	Fairfield	United Kingdom	For Norddeutsche Lloyd.
19 February	Isabel II	Velasco-class cruiser		Ferrol	Spain	For Spanish Navy.
20 February	Harvest Moon	Trawler	J. Garside	Burton upon Stather	United Kingdom	For M. Roral.
20 February	Toussaint-L'Ouverture	Gunboat	Forges et Chantiers de la Méditerranée	Le Havre	France	For Haitian Navy.
20 February	Nigel	Steamship	Messrs. Scott & Co.	Bowling	United Kingdom	For Messrs. William M'Lachlan & Co.
20 February	Prince of Wales	Paddle steamer	Barrow Ship Building Co. Ltd.	Barrow-in-Furness	United Kingdom	For Lancashire and Yorkshire Railway and London and North Western Railway.
22 February	Ruby	Fishing smack	Messrs. Rees & Sons	Dinorwic	United Kingdom	For Messrs. Collings & Evans.
23 February	Primrose Hill	Merchantman	Messrs. Thomas Royden & Sons	Liverpool	United Kingdom	For Messrs. Price & Co.
24 February	Mosquito	Tug	Messrs. Murdoch & Murray	Port Glasgow	United Kingdom	For Messrs. David Rowan & Son.
25 February	Saint Fillans	Cargo ship	Harland & Wolff	Belfast	United Kingdom	For Rankin Gilmour & Co.
25 February	Not named	Steamship	Grangemouth Dockyard Company	Grangemouth	United Kingdom	For Aberystwyth & Aberdovey Steam Packet Company Limited.
1 March	Eddystone	Steamship	W. B. Thompson	Dundee	United Kingdom	For Clyde Shipping Co.
3 March	African	Steamship	Raylton, Dixon and Co.	Middlesbrough	United Kingdom	For Union Steam-ship Company.
8 March	Alert	Tug	Messrs. Edward Finch & Co.	Chepstow	United Kingdom	For Severn and Canal Carrying, Shipping & Steam Towing Company Limited.
8 March	Beaver	Tug	Messrs. Ramage & Ferguson	Leith	United Kingdom	For Messrs. Webster & Co.
8 March	Gleaner	Steam fishing vessel	Messrs. Lawson & Eltringham	South Shields	United Kingdom	For William Osten Jr.
8 March	Leviathan	Floating crane	Messrs. Samuda Bros.	Poplar	United Kingdom	For East and West India Dock Company.
8 March	United Kingdom	Rosslyn	Steam fishing vessel	For General Steam Fishing Company Limited.		
8 March	Rionnag-na-Mara	Steam yacht	Messrs. John Reid & Co.	Port Glasgow	United Kingdom	For A. G. Pirie.
9 March	King Alfred	Barque	Messrs. Barclay, Curle & Co. Ltd	Whiteinch	United Kingdom	For Messrs. Walker, Govan & Co.
11 March	Pera	Steamship	Messrs. Earle's Shipbuilding and Engineering Company Limited	Hull	United Kingdom	For Messrs. Bailey & Leetham.
19 March	Ozone	Paddle steamer	Messrs. Napier, Shanks & Bell	Yoker	United Kingdom	For Bay Excursion Company.
20 March	Collivaud	Steamship	Bute Shipbuilding, Engineering, & Dry Dock Co.	Cardiff	United Kingdom	For Collivaud Steamship Co. Ltd.
20 March	Fearless	Cruiser	Barrow Ship Building Co. Ltd.	Barrow-in-Furness	United Kingdom	For Royal Navy.
20 March	Holyrood	Merchantman	Messrs. W. H. Potter & Sons	Liverpool	United Kingdom	For Messrs MacVicar, Marshall & Co.
20 March	No. 3	Steamship	Bute Shipbuilding, Engineering & Dry Dock Company (Limited)	Cardiff	United Kingdom	For private owner.
21 March	Vesuvio	Etna-class cruiser	Cantiere navale fratelli Orlando	Livorno	Italy	For Regia Marina.
22 March	Heron	Steam trawler	Messrs. Cook, Welton & Gemmell	Hull	United Kingdom	For Messrs. W. H. Putt & Co.
22 March	Jumna	Steamship	Messrs. William Denny & Bros.	Dumbarton	United Kingdom	For British India Steam Navigation Company.
22 March	Scotia	Steam fishing boat	L. Liddell	Wallsend	United Kingdom	For Messrs. Irvin, Spencer & Co.
23 March	Grampus	Research ship	Robert Palmer & Sons	Noank, Connecticut	United States	For United States Fish Commission.
24 March	Isabella	Steamship	Culzean Shipbuilding and Engineering Company (Limited)	Culzean	United Kingdom	For John Murray.
24 March	Morven	Steam yacht	Messrs. Caird & Co.	Greenock	United Kingdom	For James T. Caird.
26 March	Piscator	Steamship	Messrs. M'Knight & Co.	Ayr	United Kingdom	For Thomas Maclaren & Co.
30 March	Musashi	Katsuragi-class corvette	Yokosuka Naval Arsenal	Yokosuka	Japan	For Imperial Japanese Navy.
March	Stettin	Cargo ship	AG Vulcan Stettin		Germany	For Norddeutscher Lloyd.
3 April	Ellesmere	Merchantman	Messrs. Oswald, Mordaunt & Co.	Southampton	United Kingdom	For Ellesmere Shipping Company.
3 April	Lord Shaftesbury	Ketch	Messrs. G. P. Gildea & Co.	Ipswich	United Kingdom	For H. Hawkins.
3 April	Ludwig Possehl	Steamship	Flensburger Schiffbau-Gesellschaft	Flensburg	Germany	For Messrs. Ludwig, Possehl & Co.
5 April	Bothwell	Merchantman	Messrs. William Hamilton & Co.	Port Glasgow	United Kingdom	For Messrs. William Hamilton & Co.
5 April	Dalhousie	Steam trawler	W. B. Thompson	Dundee	United Kingdom	For private owner.
5 April	Emerald	Steam fishing vessel	Messrs. Marr Bros.	Leith	United Kingdom	For Messrs. Baird & Barnsley.
5 April	Eure	Meurthe-class aviso	Ateliers et Chantiers du Havre	Le Havre	France	For French Navy.
5 April	Flying Squirrel	Paddle tug	J. T. Eltringham	South Shields	United Kingdom	For Messrs. J. P. Rennoldson & Sons.
5 April	Gowanburn	Merchantman	Messrs. Scott & Co.	Cartsdyke	United Kingdom	For Messrs. R. Shankland & Co.
5 April	Inchcape Rock	Merchantman	Messrs. Russell & Company	Port Glasgow	United Kingdom	For Rock Line.
6 April	Edinburgh Castle	Paddle steamer	J. Scott	Kinghorn	United Kingdom	For M. P. Galloway.
6 April	Gloamin'	Steamship	Messrs. Hall, Russell & Co.	Aberdeen	United Kingdom	For Messrs. R. A. Mudie & Sons.
6 April	Unebi	Protected cruiser	Forges et Chantiers de la Mediterranee	Le Havre	France	For Imperial Japanese Navy.
6 April	Vanduara	Steam yacht	Messrs. D. & W. Henderson	Meadowside	United Kingdom	For Stewart Clark.
7 April	Camenes	Steam trawler	Messrs. Head & Riley	Hull	United Kingdom	For Messrs. Hall, Leyman, Cook & Co.
7 April	Dunbrody	Steamship	London and Glasgow Engineering and Iron Shipbuilding Company	Govan	United Kingdom	For Waterford Steamship Company (Limited).
7 April	Marion Inglis	Merchantman	Messrs. Archibald M'Millan & Son	Dumbarton	United Kingdom	For Messrs. Rogers & Co.
7 April	Mercedes	Steamship	Messrs. Edward Withy & Co.	Hartlepool	United Kingdom	For J. W. Adamson.
8 April	Brisk	Archer-class cruiser	Messrs. James & George Thomson	Clydebank	United Kingdom	For Royal Navy.
8 April	Enstor	Steam launch		Great Yarmouth	United Kingdom	For Mission to Deep Sea Fishermen.
8 April	Miranda	Steam yacht	Messrs. Ramage & Ferguson	Leith	United Kingdom	For George Curtis Lampson.
10 April	Tweeddale	Steam fishing boat	Messrs. Hawthorns & Co.	Leith	United Kingdom	For General Steam Fishing Company.
13 April	Not named	Steamship	W. S. Cumming	Monkland Canal	United Kingdom	For River Eye Navigation Commissioners.
14 April	Iver Hvitfeldt	Coastal defence ship	Orlogsværftet	Copenhagen	Denmark	For Royal Danish Navy.
14 April	Nordenfelt	Nordenfelt-class submarine	Barrow Ship Building Co. Ltd.	Barrow-in-Furness	United Kingdom	For Thorsten Nordenfelt.
15 Aprilo	Unnamed	Torpedo boat		Constantinople	Ottoman Empire	For Ottoman Navy.
16 April	Alejandro	Steamship	Sunderland Shipbuilding Co. Ltd	Sunderland	United Kingdom	For Joaquin Redo Sr.
16 April	Leonora	Schooner	Messrs. Camper & Nicholson	Gosport	United Kingdom	For private owner.
17 April	Cestria	Steam yacht	Messrs. Laird Bros.	Birkenhead	United Kingdom	For J. Johnson Houghton.
17 April	Innishowen Head	Steamship	Messrs. Harland & Wolff	Belfast	United Kingdom	For Ulster Steamship Company (Limited).
17 April	Stepney	Steamship	Messrs. W. Gray & Co.	West Hartlepool	United Kingdom	For Alfred Suart.
19 April	Cartdale	Steamship	Messrs. John Fullarton & Co.	Merksworth	United Kingdom	For Messrs. M'Kinney & Rafferty.
19 April	Craigisla	Barque	S. P. Austin & Son	Sunderland	United Kingdom	For Messrs. William Nicol & Co.
19 April	Grace	Steam launch	W. S. Cumming	Parkhead	United Kingdom	For Messrs. Ross & Duncan.
19 April	Oimara	Steam yacht	Messrs. John Reid & Co.	Port Glasgow	United Kingdom	For Neil Mathieson.
19 April	Satellite	Steamship	Messrs. David J. Dunlop & Co.	Port Glasgow	United Kingdom	For Trinity House.
20 April	Arawa	Steam trawler	George Brown	Hull	United Kingdom	For W. F. Robins.
20 April	Port Pirie	Steamship	Messrs. Hawthorn, Leslie & Co.	Hebburn	United Kingdom	For Australasian Steam Navigation and Trading Company.
20 April	Sevan	Tanker	Boolds, Sharer & Co	Pallion	United Kingdom	For J. Pitoef.
20 April	Unnamed	Steamship	Messrs. Boolds, Sharer & Co.	Pallion	United Kingdom	For A. Mantichoff.
21 April	Bannockburn	Merchantman	Messrs. Barclay, Curle & Co.	Whiteinch	United Kingdom	For Messrs. Robert Shankland & Co.
21 April	Clitus	Steamship	Palmer's Shipbuilding and Iron Company (Limited)	Jarrow	United Kingdom	For Messrs. Currie & Co.
21 April	Fijian	Steamship	Palmer's Shipbuilding and Iron Company (Limited)	Jarrow	United Kingdom	For G. W. Nicoll.
21 April	Ituna	Steam yacht	Messrs. A. & J. Inglis	Pointhouse	United Kingdom	For John G. Mackie.
21 April	Perseverance	Full-rigged ship	W. B. Thompson	Whiteinch	United Kingdom	For MM. A. D. Bordes et Fils.
21 April	Saale	Ocean liner	Fairfield Engineering and Shipbuilding Co. Ltd.	Fairfield	United Kingdom	For Norddeutscher Lloyd. Ran aground on being launched.
21 April	Wapping	Steamship	Messrs. W. Gray & Co.	West Hartlepool	United Kingdom	For Alfred Suart.
22 April	Suakim	Merchantman	Messrs. Russell & Co.	Kingston	United Kingdom	For G. R. Staves.
23 April	Solway	Paddle tug	Messrs. Ramage & Ferguson	Leith	United Kingdom	For North British Steam Packet Company.
24 April	Inishowen Head	Cargo ship	Harland & Wolff	Belfast	United Kingdom	For Ulster Steamship Co.
26 Apriol	Ani	Tanker	Boolds, Sharer & Co.	Pallion	United Kingdom	For J. Pitoev.
26 April	Samson	Paddle tug	Messrs. D. and W. Henderson	Meadowside	United Kingdom	For Glasgow & Greenock Shipping Company.
27 April	Ina M'Tavish	Steamship	Messrs. Burrell	Hamiltonhill	United Kingdom	For Mr. M'Tavish.
April	Queen of the Exe	Tug	W. S. Cumming	Parkhead	United Kingdom	For Exe Navigation Commissioners.
April	Salisbury	Steam barge	Messr. Murdoch & Murray	Port Glasgow	United Kingdom	For Clyde Shipping Company.
1 May	Atlantic	Yacht		New York	United States	For private owner.
1 May	Northenden	Steamship	C. S. Swan & Hunter	Wallsend	United Kingdom	For Manchester, Sheffield & Lincolnshire Railway.
3 May	Athena	Fishing boat	Mr. Liddle	Wallsend	United Kingdom	For A. Robertson.
4 May	Cassandra	Steam yacht	Culzean Shipbuilding and Engineering Company	Culzean	United Kingdom	For James George Clark.
4 May	Dardanus	Steamship	Messrs. Hawthorn, Leslie & Co.	Hebburn	United Kingdom	For Ocean Steamship Company.
4 May	Scholar	Steamship	Messrs. Raylton Dixon & Co.	Middlesbrough	United Kingdom	For Messrs. Thomas & James Harrison.
4 May	Silvia	Steamship	Flensburger Schiffbau-Gesellschaft	Flensburg	Germany	For "Flensburg-Stettiner Steamship Co".
5 May	Aeolus	Merchantman	Messrs. Barclay, Curle & Co. (Limited)	Whiteinch	United Kingdom	For Messrs. A. and J. H. Carmichael & Co.
5 May	Argyll	Steamship	Messrs. Robert Duncan & Co.	Port Glasgow	United Kingdom	For Argyll Steamship Company (Limited).
5 May	Earl of Bute	Paddle Tug	Joseph T. Eltringham	South Shields	United Kingdom	For Martin & Marquand.
5 May	Lord Templeton	Barque	Harland & Wolff	Belfast	United Kingdom	For Irish Shipowners Ltd.
5 May	Rosalind	Steam yacht	Messrs. Cochran & Co.	Bidston	United Kingdom	For private owner.
5 May	Not named	Steamship	Grangemouth Dockyard Company	Grangemouth	United Kingdom	For J. P. Adamson.
6 May	Erne	Full-rigged ship	Russell & Co.	Greenock	United Kingdom	For Nourse Line.
6 May	Orizaba	Ocean liner	Barrow Ship Building Co. Ltd.	Barrow-in-Furness	United Kingdom	For Pacific Steam Navigation Company.
7 May	Porpoise	Archer-class torpedo cruiser	J. & G. Thompson	Glasgow	United Kingdom	For Royal Navy.
7 May	Venus	Ferry	Messrs. Edwards & Symes	Cubitt Town	United Kingdom	For private owner.
8 May	Adventuress	Steam trawler	Messrs. Camper & Nicholson	Gosport	United Kingdom	For private owner.
8 May	Lord Raglan	Merchantman	Messrs. Thomas Royden & Sons	Liverpool	United Kingdom	For Messrs. Herron & Co.
8 May	May	Steamship	Barrow Shipbuilding Company	Barrow in Furness	United Kingdom	For Messrs. R. Singlehurst & Company.
8 May	Minnie	Steamship	Barrow Shipbuilding Company	Barrow in Furness	United Kingdom	For Messrs. R. Singlehurst & Company.
10 May	Cape Merchant	Steamship	Messrs. A. M'Millan and Son	Dumbarton	United Kingdom	For Messrs. Suter, Williams & Co.
11 May	Ossifrage	Steamship	F. W. Wheeler & Co.	West Bay City, Michigan	United States	For Ball William.
12 May	Catch Me	Steam fishing boat	Robert Moir	Glasgow	United Kingdom	For William Ralston and others.
15 May	Santa Rita	Steam yacht	Grangemouth Dockyard Company	Grangemouth	United Kingdom	For J. O. Sullivan.
15 May	Tungchow	Steamship	Messrs. Scott & Co.	Greenock	United Kingdom	For China Steam Navigation Company.
17 May	Charles	Steamship	Strand Slipway Co.	Sunderland	United Kingdom	For Chevilotte Frères.
17 May	Margaret	Steam trawler	Thomas Charlton	Grimsby	United Kingdom	For James Alward.
18 May	Active	Steamship	Messrs. J. Webster & Co.	Fraserburgh	United Kingdom	For Fraserburgh & Leith Shipping Company.
18 May	Chesma	Ekaterina II-class battleship	ROPiT Shipyard	Sevastopol	Russia	For Imperial Russian Navy.
18 May	Fire Fay	Steam yacht	Messrs. Lobnitz & Co.	Renfrew	United Kingdom	For J. W. Clayton.
18 May	General Gordon	Merchantman	Messrs. R. & J. Evans & Co.	Liverpool	United Kingdom	For Messrs. Lewis, Davies & Co.
18 May	Netherby	Merchantman	Messrs. Ritson & Co.	Maryport	United Kingdom	For J. Dodd.
18 May	Poplar	Steamship	Messrs. William Gray & Co.	West Hartlepool	United Kingdom	For Alfred Suart.
18 May	Strathspey	Barque	Grangemouth Dockyard Company	Grangemouth	United Kingdom	For Messrs. Anderson, Woods & Co.
20 May	Ekaterina II	Ekaterina II-class battleship	Nikolayev Admiralty Dockyard	Nikolaev	Russia	For Imperial Russian Navy.
20 May	Uarda	Despatch vessel	Messrs. John Fullarton & Co.	Paisley	United Kingdom	For Egyptian Government.
20 May	Medway	Steamship	Charles Connell & Co. Ltd.	Scotstoun	United Kingdom	For Messrs. William Sloan & Co.
20 May	Ouse Hopper No. 3	Hopper barge	Messrs. William Dobson & Co.	Low Walker	United Kingdom	For Aire and Calder Navigation Company.
20 May	Victoria	Paddle steamer	Messrs. Blackwood & Gordon	Port Glasgow	United Kingdom	For Wemyss Bay Steamboat Company, or Mr. Campbell.
20 May	Victoria	Paddle steamer	Fairfield Shipbuilding and Engineering Company (Limited)	Fairfield	United Kingdom	For London, Chatham and Dover Railway.
20 May	Zulu	Cutter	Messrs. Fife & Son	Fairlie	United Kingdom	For Major Wynne.
21 May	Guadalquion	Steamboat	Mr. Skelton	Millwall	United Kingdom	For Isaias White.
21 May	Liverpool City	Merchantman	Messrs. Russell & Company	Port Glasgow	United Kingdom	For Messrs. Thomas Edwards & Co.
21 May	Venus	Paddle steamer	William Denny & Bros.	Dumbarton	United Kingdom	For La Platense Flotilla Company (Limited).
22 May	Eldorado	Steamship	Messrs. Earle's Shipbuilding and Engineering Company, Limited	Hull	United Kingdom	For Messrs. Thomas Wilson, Sons & Co.
22 May	Maggie W. Smith	Schooner	Ardrossan Shipbuilding Company	Ardrossan	United Kingdom	For Archibald Thomson.
25 May	Madge Wildfire	Paddle steamer	Messrs. M'Knight & Co.	Ayr	United Kingdom	For Robert Campbell.
26 May	Diamond	Steamship	Messrs. Scott & Co.	Bowling	United Kingdom	For Messrs. William Robertson & Co.
29 May	Iulio Feodoro	Barque	Flensburger Schiffbau-Gesellschaft	Flensburg	Germany	For Messrs. Bahr Bros.
30 May	William H. Starbuck	Schooner	J. S. Ellis & Son	New York	United States	For Jacob A. Heath.
31 May	Gertrude	Steam yacht	Messrs. A.and J. Inglis	Partick	United Kingdom	For Thomas Hayes.
May	Daniza	Steamboat	Messrs. T. B. Seath & Co.	Rutherglen	United Kingdom	For J. Guirovich.
May	Lark	Steam trawler	Messrs. Cook, Welton & Gemmell	Hull	United Kingdom	For Messrs. Pickering & Haldane.
May	Rob Ritchie	Steamboat	Messrs. William Denny & Bros.	Dumbarton	United Kingdom	For Messrs Dennny & Co.
2 June	Flying Dragon	Tug	Messrs. Robert Duncan & Co.	Port Glasgow	United Kingdom	For Clyde Shipping Company.
2 June	Prince Albert	Paddle steamer	Cockerill Company	Hoboken	Belgium	For Belgian Government.
2 June	W. I. Radcliffe	Steamship	Palmer's Shipbuilding and Iron Company	Jarrow	United Kingdom	For Messrs. Evan Thomas, Radcliffe & Co.
3 June	Bangalore	full-rigged ship	Messrs. Richardson, Duck & Co.	Stockton-on-Tees	United Kingdom	For Messrs. George Croshaw & Co.
3 June	Broughshane	Steamship	Messrs. Workman, Clark & Co. (Limited)	Belfast	United Kingdom	For Antrim Iron Ore Company (Limited).
3 June	Cossack	Archer-class torpedo cruiser	Messrs. Thompson's	Whiteinch	United Kingdom	For Royal Navy.
3 June	County of Roxburgh	Merchantman	Messrs. Barclay, Curle & Co.	Whiteinch	United Kingdom	For Messrs. R. & J. Craig.
4 June	Falls of Garry	Merchantman	Messrs. Russell & Co.	Greenock	United Kingdom	For Messrs. Wright & Breakenridge.
4 June	Not named	Steam launch	Messrs. Edward Finch & Co. Limited	Chepstow	United Kingdom	For Messrs. Cory Bros. & Co.
5 June	Dalhousie	Troopship	Messrs. Caird & Co.	Greenock	United Kingdom	For Indian Government.
5 June	Maid of Cove	Fishing boat		carrigaloe	United Kingdom	For private owner.
5 June	New Zealand	Steam fishing trawler	Messrs. Cochrane & Co.	Beverley	United Kingdom	For Hull Red Cross Steam Fishing and Ice Company.
7 June	Bessfield	Barque	Messrs. Workman, Clark & Co.	Belfast	United Kingdom	For Messrs. William Porter & Sons.
7 June	Danube	Tug	Messrs. David. J. Dunlop & Co.	Port Glasgow	United Kingdom	For London and Tilbury Lighterage Company (Limited).
7 June	Ouse Hopper No. 4	Steam hopper barge	Messrs. William Dobson & Co.	Low Walker	United Kingdom	For Aire and Calder Navigation Company.
8 June	Nile	Merchantman	Messrs. Russell & Co.	Port Glasgow	United Kingdom	For Alfred Brown.
9 June	Avilesino	Steamship	Usk Shipbuilding Company	Newport	United Kingdom	For private owner.
9 June	Warrington	Steamship	C. S. Swan & Hunter	Wallsend	United Kingdom	For Manchester, Sheffield and Lincolnshire Railway.
10 June	Kanal	Steamship	Flensburger Schiffbau-Gesellschaft	Flensburg	Germany	For private owner.
15 June	Lawrence	Paddle steamer / Despatch vessel	Messrs. Laird Bros	Birkenhead	United Kingdom	For Indian Government.
16 June	Glückauf	Tanker	Armstrong, Mitchell and Company	Newcastle upon Tyne	United Kingdom	For Heinrich Riedemann.
16 June	Santa	Barque	Robert Thompson & Sons	Sunderland	United Kingdom	For Turner, Edwards & Co.
17 June	Amazon	Barque	Messrs. Barclay, Curle & Co.	Whiteinch	United Kingdom	For Messrs Robert Hill & Co.
17 June	Bakuin	Tanker	Messrs. W. Gray & Co.	West Hartlepool	United Kingdom	For Alfred Suart.
17 June	Eddystone	Steamship	Messrs. M. Pearse & Co.	Stockton-on-Tees	United Kingdom	For Messrs. Farrar, Groves & Co.
17 June	Euterpe	Steamship	Joseph L. Thompson & Sons	Monkwearmouth	United Kingdom	For Österreichischer Lloyd.
17 June	Gilbertson	Dredger	Messrs. Fleming & Ferguson	Paisley	United Kingdom	For Ribble Improvement Commissioners.
17 June	Tremayne	Steamship	Messrs. John Readhead & Sons	South Shields	United Kingdom	For Messrs. Edward Hain and Son.
17 June	Victoria	Paddle tug	Messrs. J. P. Rennoldson & Sons	South Shields	United Kingdom	For Vincent Grech.
17 June	Unnamed	Barge	Messrs. Edward Finch & Sons	Chepstow	United Kingdom	For Bristol Docks Committee.
18 June	Eolo	Paddle steamer	Messrs. William Denny & Bros.	Dumbarton	United Kingdom	For La Platense Flotilla Company (Limited).
18 June	Lily	Steam yacht	Culzean Shipbuilding and Engineering Company (Limited)	Culzean	United Kingdom	For Marquess of Ailsa.
18 June	Morning Star	Steam yacht	Messrs. Marr Bros.	Leith	United Kingdom	For James Bolton.
19 June	Cacongo	Gunboat	Messrs. Laird Bros.	Birkenhead	United Kingdom	For Portuguese Navy.
19 June	Powhatan	Steamship	Barrow Ship Building Co. Ltd.	Barrow-in-Furness	United Kingdom	For Mediterranean and New York Steamship Co. Ltd.
19 June	Siddons	Steamship	Messrs. Oswald, Mordaunt & Co.	Southampton	United Kingdom	For Messrs. Lamport & Hold.
19 June	Woodcock	Steamship	Campbeltown Shipping Company	Campbeltown	United Kingdom	For Jersey Shipping Company.
22 June	Riverside	Merchantman	Messrs. Russell & Co.	Kingston	United Kingdom	For Messrs. T. C. Jones & Co.
22 June	Somali	Steamship	Messrs. Murdoch & Murray	Port Glasgow	United Kingdom	For Somali Company (Limited).
22 June	Swanmore	Barque	Harland & Wolff	Belfast	United Kingdom	For W. J. Myers Ltd.
25 June	Pola	Steam launch or tug	Messrs. William Swan & Co.	Kelvindock	United Kingdom	For Luis de Stein.
30 June	Jin-ho	Steamship	Messrs. Blackwood & Gordon	Port Glasgow	United Kingdom	For private owner.
30 June	Sareea	Despatch vessel	W. S. Cumming	Glasgow	United Kingdom	For Egyptian Government.
June	Alaska	Pilot cutter	Mr. Evans	Saul	United Kingdom	For Messrs. Blinkworth & Tanner.
June	Ariel	Cutter	Messrs. Fyffe	Fairlie	United Kingdom	For P. Donaldson.
June	Balny	Torpedo boat		Cherbourg	France	For French Navy.
June	Dérouléde	Torpedo boat		Cherbourg	France	For French Navy.
June	Black-and-Tan	Cutter	Messrs. Fyffe	Fairlie	United Kingdom	For Marquess of Ailsa.
June	Cruiser	Steam yacht	Messrs. Fyffe	Fairlie	United Kingdom	For James Coats.
June	Eileen	Cutter	Messrs. Fyffe	Fairlie	United Kingdom	For Trevor Henderson.
June	Margaret	Steam trawler	Mr. Chorlton	Hull	United Kingdom	For private owner.
June	Primula	Cutter	Messrs. Fyffe	Fairlie	United Kingdom	For A. S. Matier.
June	Zulu	Cutter	Messrs. Fyffe	Fairlie	United Kingdom	For C. B. Wynus.
1 July	Castor	Barque	Messrs. Ramage & Ferguson	Leith	United Kingdom	For W. S. Croudall.
2 July	Lufra	Yawl	Messrs. Camper & Nicholson	Gosport	United Kingdom	For Duke of Rutland.
2 July	Salsette	Merchantman	Messrs. Birrell, Stenhouse & Co.	Dumbarton	United Kingdom	For private owner.
3 July	Heraclides	Steamship	Boolds, Sharer & Co.	High Pallion	United Kingdom	For R. P. Houston & Co.
3 July	Massabi	Gunboat	Messrs. Laird Bros.	Birkenhead	United Kingdom	For Portuguese Navy.
3 July	Mitraille	Fusée-classgunboat	Arsenal de Rochefort	Rochefort	France	For French Navy
5 July	Thalia	Steamship	Messrs. William Denny & Bros.	Dumbarton	United Kingdom	For Österreichischer Lloyd.
6 July	Dolphin	Dredger	Messrs. William Simons & Co.	Renfrew	United Kingdom	For Crown Agents for the Colonies.
6 July	Tarapaca	Merchantman	W. B. Thompson	Dundee or Whiteinch	United Kingdom	For MM. A. D. Bordes et Fils.
6 July	Not named	Steamship	Messrs. A. M'Millan & Son	Dumbarton	United Kingdom	For private owner.
7 July	Elgiva	Steamship	Messrs. Workman, Clak & Co. (Limited)	Belfast	United Kingdom	For Messrs. Colvils, Lowden & Co.
8 July	Annam	Steamship	Fairfield Shipbuilding and Engineering Company (Limited)	Fairfield	United Kingdom	For Société Française d'Enterprises Coloniales.
10 July	Preussen	Steamship	AG Vulcan	Stettin	Germany	For private owner.
13 July	Beaver	Tug	Ramage & Ferguson	Leith	United Kingdom	For Brisbane Tug & Steam Ship Company.
15 July	Gwydir	Steamship	Messrs. John Readhjead & Co.	South Shields	United Kingdom	For Hunter River New Steam Navigation Company.
15 July	Iniziativa	Steamship	John Knox & Co	South Hylton	United Kingdom	For Zino Bros.
15 July	Warren Hastings	Tug	Messrs. Robert Duncan & Co.	Port Glasgow	United Kingdom	For Messrs. James Wylie & Co.
17 July	Changsha	Steamship	Messrs. Scott & Co.	Greenock	United Kingdom	For China Navigation Company.
17 July	Genesta	Schooner	W. Shilston	Coxside	United Kingdom	For private owner.
17 July	Indian Prince	Steamship	Short Bros.	Pallion	United Kingdom	For Prince Steam Shipping Co. Ltd.
20 July	Bahia	Steamship	Messrs. Sir W. G. Armstrong, Mitchell & Co. Ltd.	Low Walker	United Kingdom	For Hamburg Südamerikanische Dampfschifffahrts-Gesellschaft A/S & Co KG.
20 July	Port Yarrock	Merchantman	Messrs. Russell & Co.	Port Glasgow	United Kingdom	For Messrs. Crawford & Rowatt.
21 July	Britannia	Steam trawler	Messrs. Cook, Welton & Gemmell	Hull	United Kingdom	For Humber Steam Trawling Company (Limited).
21 July	Falls of Halladale	Barque	Russell and Company	Greenock	United Kingdom	For Wright, Breakenridge & Co.
22 July	Pluto	Steamship	Joseph L. Thompson & Sons	Monkwearmouth	United Kingdom	For Österreichischer Lloyd.
24 July	Leytenant Ilyin	Leytenant Ilyin-class cruiser		Saint Petersburg	Russia	For Imperial Russian Navy.
29 July	Ban Seng Guan	Steamship	Messrs. Ramage & Ferguson	Leith	United Kingdom	For private owner.
29 July	Destructor	Destroyer	James & George Thompson	Clydebank	United Kingdom	For Spanish Navy.
29 July	Ersatz-Lorely	Despatch vessel		Kiel	Germany	For Kaiserliche Marine.
29 July	Greif	Aviso	Germaniawerft	Kiel	Germany	For Kaiserliche Marine.
31 July	Earl of Aberdeen	Merchantman	Charles Connell & Co. Ltd.	Scotstoun	United Kingdom	For Earl Line.
31 July	Federation	Steamship	S. P. Austin & Son	Sunderland	United Kingdom	For Co-operative Wholesale Society Ltd.
31 July	Horatia	Paddle steamer	Messrs. C. S. Swan, Hunter & Co.	North Shields	United Kingdom	For Messrs. Sproston, Son & Co.
July	Greystoke Castle	Merchantman	Messrs. Williamson & Son	Workington	United Kingdom	For Walter Chambers.
July	Miseno	Cruiser		Castellamare di Stabia	United Kingdom	For Regia Marina.
July	Otter	Steam lighter	Messrs. J. M'Arthur & Co.	Abbotsinch	United Kingdom	For Messrs. Bow, M'Lachlan & Co.
July	Portugal	Steamship	Messageries Maritimes	La Ciotat	France	For Messageries Maritimes.
2 August	Aurora	Paddle steamer	Messrs. William Denny & Bros.	Dumbarton	United Kingdom	For La Platense Flotilla Company (Limited).
2 August	Unnamed	Fishing smack		Whitby	United Kingdom	For J. W. Haylock.
3 August	Marquis of Hartington	Transport ship	Messrs. Hawthorne, Leslie & Co.	Hebburn	United Kingdom	For Royal Navy.
3 August	Orlando	Orlando-class cruiser	Palmers Shipbuilding and Iron Company	Jarrow	United Kingdom	For Royal Navy.
4 August	Saint Regulus	Steamship	Messrs. Thomas Royden & Sons	Liverpool	United Kingdom	For Messrs. Rankin, Gilmour & Co.
5 August	Ixia	Steam yacht	Messrs. Barclay, Curle & Co. (Limited)	Whiteinch	United Kingdom	For A. C. Guthrie.
5 August	Rattler	Bramble-class gunboat	Sir William Armstrong & Co.	Elswick	United Kingdom	For Royal Navy.
7 August	Korietz	Korietz-class gunboat	Bergsund Mekaniska	Stockholm	Sweden	For Imperial Russian Navy.
14 August	Danzig	Steamship		Brezow	Germany	For "Japan-Australian Line".
14 August	Ethelbald	Steamship	Messrs. Workman, Clark and Co. (Limited)	Belfast	United Kingdom	For Messrs. Colvils, Lowden & Co.
14 August	Peeress	Steamship	Short Bros	Sunderland	United Kingdom	For Taylor & Sanderson.
14 August	Rosa	Steamship	Messrs. Wigham, Richardson & Co.	Low Walker	United Kingdom	For private owner.
14 August	Stanmore	Barque	Messrs. Harland & Wolff	Belfast	United Kingdom	For Messrs. W. J. Myers, Sons & Co.
16 August	Wearmouth	Steamship	Strand Slipway Co.	Sunderland	United Kingdom	For Fenwick & Co.
16 August	Zuari	Steamship	Grangemouth Dockyard Company	Grangemouth	United Kingdom	For Bombay Steam Navigation Company.
17 August	Abeona	Steamship	Messrs. W. Gray & Co.	West Hartlepool	United Kingdom	For Messrs. Rickinson & Co.
17 August	Worsley Hall	Steamship	Palmers Shipbuilding and Iron Company	Jarrow	United Kingdom	For Messrs. Alexander & Co.
18 August	F. S. Ciampa	Merchantman	Messrs. D. & W. Henderson & Co.	Meadowside	United Kingdom	For private owner.
18 August	Maya	Maya-class gunboat	Onohama Shipyards	Kobe	Japan	For Imperial Japanese Navy.
18 August	Princess Ebb	Merchantmen	Union Co-operative Shipbuilding Company	Blyth	United Kingdom	For A. Robertson, J. Maltman and Mr. Sinton.
19 August	Chingtu	Steamship	Messrs. Scott & Co.	Cartsdyke	United Kingdom	For China Steam Navigation Company (Limited).
20 August	Not named	Merchantman	Messrs. Russell & Co.	Greenock	United Kingdom	For private owner.
25 August	Tripoli	Torpedo cruiser	Regio Cantiere di Castellammare di Stabia	Castellammare di Stabia	United Kingdom	For Regia Marina.
28 August	Gravina	Steamship	Messrs. John Readhead & Co.	South Shields	United Kingdom	For Messrs. Roca & Co.
28 August	Mandovi	Steamship	Grangemouth Dockyard Company	Grangemouth	United Kingdom	For Messrs. Dunsmuir & Jackson.
28 August	Rembrandt	Steamship	Joseph L. Thompson & Sons	Monkwearmouth	United Kingdom	For Frederick Bolton & Co.
28 August	Tijuca	Steamship	Armstrong, Mitchell & Co.	Low Walker	United Kingdom	For Hamburg Südamerikanische Dampfschifffahrts-Gesellschaft A/S & Co KG.
30 August	Ardgay	Steamship	Messrs. William Dobson & Co.	Low Walker	United Kingdom	For Messrs. Adam Bros.
30 August	Edith	Steam fishing vessel	Messrs. J. M'Kenzie & Co.	Leith	United Kingdom	For Messrs. Howarth & Clark.
31 August	Glengyle	Steamship	London and Glasgow Shipbuilding and Engineering Company	Govan	United Kingdom	For Glen Line.
31 August	Ormiston	Cargo ship	Harland & Wolff	Belfast	United Kingdom	For Irish Shipowners Ltd.
31 August	Oroya	Steamship	Barrow Ship Building Co. Ltd.	Barrow-in-Furness	United Kingdom	For Pacific Steam Navigation Company.
August	Bangalore	Full-rigged ship	Richardson, Duck & Company	Stockton-on-Tees	United Kingdom	For G. Crenshaw & Co.
1 September	Ben-y-Gloe	Merchantman	Messrs. Russell & Co.	Port Glasgow	United Kingdom	For Messrs. Watson Bros.
1 September	Kirton	Steam trawler	Messrs. Cochrane & Son	Beverley	United Kingdom	For Boston Deep Sea Fishing and Ice Company, Limited.
1 September	Walter Bibby	Dredger	Messrs. Fleming & Ferguson	Leith	United Kingdom	For Preston Corporation.
2 September	Rahane	Full-rigged ship	Messrs. Robert Duncan & Co.	Port Glasgow	United Kingdom	For Messrs. Thom & Cameron.
2 September	Swift	Steamship	Messrs. Schlesinger, Davis & Co.	Wallsend	United Kingdom	For Messrs. R. & W. Paul.
2 September	Wainui	Steamship	Messrs. Murray Bros.	Dumbarton	United Kingdom	For J. H. Williams.
6 September	Abdül Hamid	Nordenfelt-class submarine	Barrow Ship Building Co. Ltd.	Constantinople	Ottoman Empire	For Ottoman Navy.
11 September	Cortez	Merchantman	Messrs. Oswald, Mordaunt & Co.	Southampton	United Kingdom	For George Petrie.
11 September	Rattlesnake	Torpedo gunboat	Laird Bros.	Birkenhead	United Kingdom	For Royal Navy.
13 September	Flying Scotsman	Tug	Messrs. J. E. Eltringham & Co.	South Shields	United Kingdom	For Clyde Steam Shipping Company.
13 September	Nick o'Time	Steam fishing boat	Messrs. W. White & Sons	Cowes	United Kingdom	For F. W. T. Popham.
13 September	Orinoco	Ocean liner	Caird & Company	Greenock	United Kingdom	For Royal Mail Steam Packet Company.
13 September	Wasp	Banterer-class gunboat	Sir W. G. Armstrong, Mitchell & Co.	Elswick-on-Tyne	United Kingdom	For Royal Navy.
15 September	Bléville	Steamship	Messrs. Alexander Stephen & Sons	Linthouse	United Kingdom	For C. Brown.
16 September	Rainham	Tanker	Messrs. Surridge & Sons	Millwall	United Kingdom	For Messrs. Mason & Barry.
16 September	Wayfarer	Merchantman	W. H. Potter & Sons	Liverpool	United Kingdom	For W. H. Potter & Sons.
20 September	Lyndhurst	Merchantman	Messrs. Archibald M'Millan & Son	Dumbarton	United Kingdom	For Messrs. W. R. Price & Co.
25 September	Glendale	Steamship	James Laing	Sunderland	United Kingdom	For P. H. Laing.
25 September	La Victorine	Sternwheeler	Messrs. Laird Bros.	Birkenhead	United Kingdom	For Messrs. Widow, Duranty & Son.
27 September	Imperator	Steamship	Österreichse Lloyd	Trieste	Austria-Hungary	For Österreichsche Lloyd.
28 September	Australia	Merchantman	Messrs. Russell & Co.	Kingston	United Kingdom	For Messrs. P. Denniston & Co.
28 September	Australind	Steamship	Messrs. Blackwood & Gordon	Port Glasgow	United Kingdom	For Messrs. Trinder, Anderson & Co.
28 September	Navigator	Steamship	James Laing	Sunderland	United Kingdom	For Charente Steamship Co. Ltd., or Messrs. T. & J. Harrison.
28 September	Taiyuan	Steamship	Messrs. Scott & Co.	Cartsdyke	United Kingdom	For China Navigation Company (Limited).
29 September	Arara	Steamship	Messrs. M. Pearse & Co.	Stockton-on-Tees	United Kingdom	For private owner.
29 September	Cedar Branch	Steamship	Bartram, Haswell & Co	Sunderland	United Kingdom	For Nautilus Steam Shipping Co. Ltd.
29 September	Folgore	Folgore-class cruiser	Regio Cantiere di Castellammare di Stabia	Castellammare di Stabia	Italy	For Regia Marina.
29 September	Gladiator	Steam yacht	Messrs. Ramage & Ferguson	Leith	United Kingdom	For Richard Martin.
29 September	Hamburg	Barque	Ezra Churchill & Sons	Hantsport	Canada	For Ezra Churchill & Sons.
29 September	Hoche	Barbette ship		Lorient	France	For French Navy.
29 September	Ormuz	Steamship	Fairfield Shipbuilding and Engineering Company (Limited)	Fairfield	United Kingdom	For Orient Steam Navigation Company (Limited).
29 September	Port Augusta	Steamship	Tyne Iron Shipbuilding Company, Limited	Newcastle upon Tyne	United Kingdom	For private owner.
29 September	Zhiyuan	Zhiyuan-class cruiser	Sir W. G. Armstrong, Mitchell & Co.	Elswick	United Kingdom	For Imperial Chinese Navy.
30 September	Colony	Full-rigged ship	William Doxford & Sons	Sunderland	United Kingdom	For Ogwen Ship Co. Ltd.
30 September	Churruca	Steamship	Messrs John Readhead & Sons	South Shields	United Kingdom	For Messrs. José, Roca & Co.
30 September	Kinfauns	Barque	Messrs. Alexander Stephen & Sons	Linthouse	United Kingdom	For Charles Couper.
30 September	Port Ramsay	Merchantman	Messrs. Russell & Co.	Port Glasgow	United Kingdom	For Port Line.
September	Ribble	Paddle tug	W. Allsup & Sons Ltd.	Preston	United Kingdom	For Mayor, Aldermen & Burgesses of the Borough of Preston.
2 October	Methley Hall	Steamship	Palmers Shipbuilding and Iron Company	Jarrow	United Kingdom	For private owner.
5 October	Pitagoras	Schooner	Messrs. William Denny & Bros.	Dumbarton	United Kingdom	For private owner.
7 October	Alice	Steam launch	Messrs. James Taylor & Co.	Birkenhead	United Kingdom	For Messrs. Widow Duranty & Son.
11 October	Cambridge	Steamship	Earle's Shipbuilding	Hull	United Kingdom	For Great Eastern Railway.
12 October	Federation	Steamship	Joseph L. Thompson & Sons	Monkwearmouth	United Kingdom	For Angier Brothers, or Manchester Wholesale Co-operative Society.
12 October	Hercules	Dredger	Harland & Wolff	Belfast	United Kingdom	For Londonderry Harbour Board.
13 October	Malta	Steamship	Messrs. D. Allan & Co.	Granton	United Kingdom	For private owner.
14 October	Alva	Steam yacht		Wilmington, Delaware	United States	For William K. Vanderbilt.
14 October	Annie Park	Schooner	Paul Rodgers	Carrickfergus	United Kingdom	For Messrs. James Fisher & Sons.
14 October	Astrœa	Steamship	Messrs. W. Gray & Co.	West Hartlepool	United Kingdom	For Messrs. Rickinson, Son & Co.
14 October	Frances	Lighter	Messrs. George Brown, Sons & Co.	Hull	United Kingdom	For John Scott.
14 October	Samuel Tyzack	Steamship	Joseph L. Thompson & Sons	Monkwearmouth	United Kingdom	For Tyzack & Branfoot.
14 October	Teseo	Paddle steamer	Messrs. William Denny & Bros.	Dumbarton	United Kingdom	For private owner.
16 October	Colchester	Steamship	Earle's Shipbuilding	Hull	United Kingdom	For Great Eastern Railway.
16 October	Ester	Steamship	Boolds, Sharer & Co.	Pallion	United Kingdom	For J. Bunster.
18 October	Bavaria	Steamship		Stettin	Germany	For "Imperial German Line".
20 October	Vulcano	Steamship	Messrs. William Denny & Bros.	Dumbarton	United Kingdom	For private owner.
23 October	Forth	Mersey-class cruiser		Pembroke Dockyard	United Kingdom	For Royal Navy.
27 October	Province	Merchantman	William Doxford & Sons	Pallion	United Kingdom	For Messrs. William Thomas & Co.
27 October	Santiago	Steamship	Messrs. Raylton Dixon & Co.	Middlesbrough	United Kingdom	For Messrs. Thomas Wilson, Sons & Co.
28 October	Tage	Protected cruiser	Ateliers et Chantiers de la Loire	Nantes	France	For French Navy.
28 October	Tartar	Archer-class torpedo cruiser	J. & G. Thompson	Glasgow	United Kingdom	For Royal Navy.
28 October	Tsinan	Steamship	Messrs. Scott & Co.	Greenock	United Kingdom	For China Navigation Company.
29 October	B.D., No. 1	Hopper barge	Messrs. William Simons & Co.	Renfrew	United Kingdom	For Bristol Corporation.
29 October	Kanieri	Steamship	Messrs. William Denny & Bros'	Dumbarton	United Kingdom	For Union Steamship Company of New Zealand.
30 October	Alexander Lawrence	Barque	Messrs. Archibald M'Millan & Son	Dumbarton	United Kingdom	For Messrs. Lawrence, Son & Co.
30 October	Governor Maclean	Steam yacht	Barrow Ship Building Co. Ltd.	Barrow-in-Furness	United Kingdom	For Government of the Gold Coast Colony.
30 October	Leyland Brothers	Full-rigged ship	Messrs. Oswald, Mordaunt & Co.	Southampton	United Kingdom	For Messrs. R. W. Leyland & Co.
October	Demostenes	schooner	Messrs. William Denny & Bros.	Dumbarton	United Kingdom	For private owner.
October	Diogenes	schooner	Messrs. William Denny & Bros.	Dumbarton	United Kingdom	For private owner.
October	Perseo	Paddle steamer	Messrs. William Denny & Bros.	Dumbarton	United Kingdom	For private owner.
October	Teseo	Paddle steamer	Messrs. William Denny & Bros.	Dumbarton	United Kingdom	For private owner.
2 November	Flying Serpent	Tug	Messrs. Robert Duncan & Co	Port Glasgow	United Kingdom	For Clyde Shipping Company.
10 November	Tasmania	Merchantman	Messrs. Russell & Co.	Kingston	United Kingdom	For Messrs. P. Denniston & Co.
12 November	Città di Milano	Cable layer	Robert Thompson & Sons	Sunderland	United Kingdom	For Pirelli & Co.
12 November	S32	Torpedo boat	Schichau-Werke	Elbing	Germany	For Kaiserliche Marine
13 November	Eagle	Steamship	Messrs. Blackwood & Gordon	Port Glasgow	United Kingdom	For Messrs. Blackwood & Gordon.
13 November	Isla de Luzón	Isla de Luzón-class cruiser	Sir W. G. Armstrong, Mitchell & Co.	Elswick	United Kingdom	For Spanish Navy.
13 November	Marmion	Steamship	Messrs. Scott & Co.	Bowling	United Kingdom	For William Watt.
20 November	Bianca	Steamship	Flensburger Schiffbau-Gesellschaft	Flensburg	Germany	For private owner.
23 November	Bayley	Steamship	C. S. Swan & Hunter	Wallsend	United Kingdom	For Messrs. C. C. Barton & H. Benham.
25 November	Australia	Orlando-class cruiser	Robert Napier and Sons	Govan	United Kingdom	For Royal Navy.
25 November	Benlawers	Steamship	Messrs. Barclay, Curle & Co.	Whiteinch	United Kingdom	For Ben Line.
25 November	Engeland	Paddle steamer	Fairfield Shipbuilding & Engineering Company (Limited)	Fairfield	United Kingdom	For Zeelandsche Stoomvaart Maatschappij.
25 November	Euscalduno	Steamship	Messrs. R. Thompson & Sons	Southwick	United Kingdom	For Señor M. M. de Arrotegui.
25 November	Forth	Steamship	Messrs. A. & J. Inglis	Partick	United Kingdom	For Carron Company.
25 November	Maryland	Steamship	Messrs. W. Gray & Co.	West Hartlepool	United Kingdom	For Baltimore Storage Company.
25 November	Undaunted	Orlando-class cruiser	Palmers Shipbuilding and Iron Company	Jarrow	United Kingdom	For Royal Navy.
25 November	Sviatoslav	Steamship	Craig, Taylor & Co	Stockton-on-Tees	United Kingdom	For private owner.
27 November	Aire	Steamship	William Dobson & Company	Walker	United Kingdom	For Goole Steam Shipping Company.
27 November	Lizard	Bramble-class gunboat	Harland & Wolff	Belfast	United Kingdom	For Royal Navy.
27 November	Thornliebank	Barque	Messrs. Russell & Co.	Port Glasgow	United Kingdom	For Messrs. Alexander Weir & Co.
29 November	Bidston Hill	Merchantman	Messrs. T. Royden & Sons	Liverpool	United Kingdom	For Messrs. W. Price & Son.
6 December	Balclutha	Full-rigged ship	Charles Connell & Co. Ltd.	Scotstoun	United Kingdom	For private owner.
9 December	Rhine	Full-rigged ship	Messsrs. Russell & Co.	Cartsdyke	United Kingdom	For James Nourse.
11 December	Bramble	Bramble-class gunboat	Harland & Wolff	Belfast	United Kingdom	For Royal Navy.
11 December	Isla de Cuba	Isla de Luzón-class cruiser	Sir W. G. Armstrong, Mitchell & Co.	Elswick	United Kingdom	For Spanish Navy.
11 December	Moyune	Steamship	Joseph L. Thompson & Sons	Monkwearmouth	United Kingdom	For private owner.
14 December	Jingyuan	Zhiyuen-class cruiser	Armstrong Whitworth	Elswick	United Kingdom	For Imperial Chinese Navy.
15 December	Narcissus	Orlando-class cruiser	Earle's Shipbuilding	Hull	United Kingdom	For Royal Navy.
17 December	Alarm	Pilot cutter	Francis Phillips	Cardiff	United Kingdom	For John White.
23 December	Duitsland or Duitschland	Paddle steamer	Fairfield Engineering and Shipbuilding Co. Ltd.	Fairfield	United Kingdom	For Zeelandsche Stoomboot Maatschappij
23 December	Earnwell	Steamship	Palmers Shipbuilding and Iron Company	Jarrow	United Kingdom	For private owner.
24 December	Aguan	Steamship	Messrs. Robert Duncan & Co.	Port Glasgow	United Kingdom	For Honduras and Central American Steamship Company.
27 December	Columbia	Steam trawler	Messrs. M. Pearse & Co.	Stockton-on-Tees	United Kingdom	For North Sea Trawling Company.
28 December	Hare	Steamship	Messrs. Barclay, Curle & Co.	Whiteinch	United Kingdom	For private owner.
Unknown date	Luda	Steamship	Sunderland Shipbuilding Co. Ltd.	Sunderland	United Kingdom	For Admiralty, or Louth Steam Navigation Company, Limited.
Unknown date	Admiral	Paddle steamer	Hepple & Co.	North Shields	United Kingdom	For private owner.
Unknown date	Adolph Woermann	Steamship	Blohm & Voss	Hamburg	Germany	For private owner.
Unknown date	Adventure	Steam trawler	Cook, Welton & Gemmell	Hull	United Kingdom	For private owner.
Unknown date	Adventuress	Steam yacht	Messrs. Camper & Nicholson	Gosport	United Kingdom	For G. A. C. Schenley.
Unknown date	Africa	Barge	Messrs. Edwards & Symes	Cubitt Town	United Kingdom	For private owner.
Unknown date	Akasha	Paddle steamer	Fairfield Shipbuilding and Engineering	Govan	United Kingdom	For British Government.
Unknown date	Albay	Gunboat	Manila Ship	Cavite	(Spain) Spanish East Indies	For Spanish Navy.
Unknown date	Albert	Steamship	James & John Hay	Kirkintilloch	United Kingdom	For private owner.
Unknown date	Albert Edward	Steamship	Day, Summers & Co.	Southampton	United Kingdom	For private owner.
Unknown date	Alethea	Pilot cutter	Mr. Evans	Saul	United Kingdom	For Messrs. Blinkworth & Tanner.
Unknown date	Algier	Steamboat	Akers Mekaniske Verksted	Christiania	Norway	For private owner.
Unknown date	Andola	Merchantman	Messrs. Thomas Royden & Sons	Liverpool	United Kingdom	For private owner.
Unknown date	Angonard	Merchantman	Forrest & Son	Limehouse or Millwall	United Kingdom	For private owner.
Unknown date	Ani	Merchantman	Boolds, Sharer & Co	Sunderland	United Kingdom	For J. Pitoeff.
Unknown date	Antelope	Steamboat	Hans Reed or Olaf Reed	Marshfield, Oregon	United States	For private owner.
Unknown date	Ardencraig	Merchantman	Messsrs. Russell & Co.	Cartsdyke	United Kingdom	For private owner.
Unknown date	Arono	Steamship	James Laing	Sunderland	United Kingdom	For private owner.
Unknown date	Arthur	Merchantman	Cottingham Brothers	Goole	United Kingdom	For private owner.
Unknown date	Asia	Barge	Messrs. Edwards & Symes	Cubitt Town	United Kingdom	For private owner.
Unknown date	Astana II	Steamship	Motala Mekaniska Verkstads	Motala	Sweden	For private owner.
Unknown date	Atalanta	Merchantman	Schiff und Maschinenbau AG	Kiel	Germany	For private owner.
Unknown date	Australia	Merchantman	Messrs. Martens, Olsen & Co.	Laxevåg	Norway	For private owner.
Unknown date	Baiern	Steamship	Stettiner Maschinenbau	Bredow	Germany	For private owner.
Unknown date	Balniel	Steamship	MacIlwaine, Lewis & Co. Ltd	Belfast	United Kingdom	For Wigan Coal and Iron Company.
Unknown date	Banjermassin	Steamship	Messrs. Wigham, Ricardson & Co.	Newcastle upon Tyne	United Kingdom	For private owner.
Unknown date	Barge No. 1	Hopper barge	W. Allsup & Sons Ltd.	Preston	United Kingdom	For Mayor, Aldermen & Burgesses of the Borough of Preston.
Unknown date	Barge No. 2	Hopper barge	W. Allsup & Sons Ltd.	Preston	United Kingdom	For Mayor, Aldermen & Burgesses of the Borough of Preston.
Unknown date	Barge No. 3	Hopper barge	W. Allsup & Sons Ltd.	Preston	United Kingdom	For Mayor, Aldermen & Burgesses of the Borough of Preston.
Unknown date	Barge No. 4	Hopper barge	W. Allsup & Sons Ltd.	Preston	United Kingdom	For Mayor, Aldermen & Burgesses of the Borough of Preston.
Unknown date	Barge No. 5	Hopper barge	W. Allsup & Sons Ltd.	Preston	United Kingdom	For Mayor, Aldermen & Burgesses of the Borough of Preston.
Unknown date	Barge No. 6	Hopper barge	W. Allsup & Sons Ltd.	Preston	United Kingdom	For Mayor, Aldermen & Burgesses of the Borough of Preston.
Unknown date	Barge No. 7	Hopper barge	W. Allsup & Sons Ltd.	Preston	United Kingdom	For Mayor, Aldermen & Burgesses of the Borough of Preston.
Unknown date	Barge No. 8	Hopper barge	W. Allsup & Sons Ltd.	Preston	United Kingdom	For Mayor, Aldermen & Burgesses of the Borough of Preston.
Unknown date	Barge No. 9	Hopper barge	W. Allsup & Sons Ltd.	Preston	United Kingdom	For Mayor, Aldermen & Burgesses of the Borough of Preston.
Unknown date	Barge No. 10	Hopper barge	W. Allsup & Sons Ltd.	Preston	United Kingdom	For Mayor, Aldermen & Burgesses of the Borough of Preston.
Unknown date	Barge No. 11	Hopper barge	W. Allsup & Sons Ltd.	Preston	United Kingdom	For Mayor, Aldermen & Burgesses of the Borough of Preston.
Unknown date	Barge No. 12	Hopper barge	W. Allsup & Sons Ltd.	Preston	United Kingdom	For Mayor, Aldermen & Burgesses of the Borough of Preston.
Unknown date	Beatrix	Barque	North of England Shipbuilding Co. Ltd.	Sunderland	United Kingdom	For T. Beynon & Co.
Unknown date	Bede	Merchantman	Short Bros.	Sunderland	United Kingdom	For J. S. Barwick.
Unknown date	Bee	Pontoon boat	Messrs. Hawthorns & Co.	Leith	United Kingdom	For private owner.
Unknown date	Berkeley Castle	Pilot cutter	Mr. Evans	Saul	United Kingdom	For Messrs. Blinkworth & Tanner.
Unknown date	Bessfield	Merchantman	Messrs. Workman, Clark & Co. (Limited)	Belfast	United Kingdom	For private owner.
Unknown date	Beta	Steamboat	Messrs. Oswald, Mordaunt & Co.	Southampton	United Kingdom	For private owner.
Unknown date	Blackbeetle	Steamj yacht	Cochran & Co.	Birkenhead	United Kingdom	For private owner.
Unknown date	Blossom	Cutter	Ross & Duncan	Whitefield (Govan)	United Kingdom	For private owner.
Unknown date	Boyd N. Sheppard	Schooner	J. W. Vannaman & Brother	Mauricetown, New Jersey	United States	For Frank Sheppard, Harrison Sheppard and others.
Unknown date	Bremen	Steamship	Schiffswerft von Henry Koch	Lũbeck	Germany	For private owner.
Unknown date	Brigstock	Steam yacht	Cochran & Co.	Birkenhead	United Kingdom	For private owner.
Unknown date	British Prince	Steamship	Messrs. Marr Bros.	Leith	United Kingdom	For private owner.
Unknown date	Bruges	Merchantman	Robert Thompson & Sons	Sunderland	United Kingdom	For R. Thompson.
Unknown date	Bulgaria	Steamship	Messrs. Wigham, Richardson & Co.	Low Walker	United Kingdom	For private owner.
Unknown date	Burlak	Steamboat	W. Crichton & Co.	Åbo	(Russian Empire) Grand Duchy of Finland	For private owner.
Unknown date	Campinas	Steamship	Reiherstieg Schiffswerfte & Maschinenfabrik	Hamburg	Germany	For private owner.
Unknown date	Canada	Barge	Messrs. Edwards & Symes	Cubitt Town	United Kingdom	For private owner.
Unknown date	Chaucer	Steamship	Messrs. R. & W. Hawthorn, Leslie & Co.	Hebburn	United Kingdom	For private owner.
Unknown date	China	Barge	Messrs. Edwards & Symes	Cubitt Town	United Kingdom	For private owner.
Unknown date	City of Rome	Merchantman	Smith & Stevenson	Great Grimsby	United Kingdom	For private owner.
Unknown date	Clara Brown	Sternwheeler	Hiram Doncaster	Puget Sound	(United States) Washington Territory	For Thomas Brown.
Unknown date	Colonel Burnaby	Merchantman	Cottingham Brothers	Goole	United Kingdom	For private owner.
Unknown date	Condor	Steamship	Cox & Co.	Falmouth	United Kingdom	For private owner.
Unknown date	Coquette	Steamboat	Miller, Tuff & Rouse	Hammersmith	United Kingdom	For private owner.
Unknown date	Cordelia	Steamship	Flensburger Schiffbau-Gesellschaft	Flensburg	Germany	For "Hamburg Pacific Line".
Unknown date	Corriere di Genoa	Steamship	Thomas & William Smith	North Shields	United Kingdom	For private owner.
Unknown date	Countess of Lisburne	Steamship	Grangemouth Dockyard Company	Grangemouth	United Kingdom	For Aberystwyth Steam Packet Company.
Unknown date	Cuxhold	Merchantman	T. & G. Collinson	Great Grimsby	United Kingdom	For private owner.
Unknown date	Cwillsino	Steamship	L. G. Laurie & Co,	Newport	United Kingdom	For private owner.
Unknown date	Daisy	Despatch vessel	Cochran & Co.	Birkenhead	United Kingdom	For Unknown owner.
Unknown date	Daisy	Paddle steamer	Messrs. Edwards & Symes	Cubitt Town	United Kingdom	For private owner.
Unknown date	Danzig	Steamship	Stettiner Maschinenbau	Bredow	Germany	For private owner.
Unknown date	Dèpeche	Steamship	Cockerill Company	Hoboken	Belgium	For private owner.
Unknown date	Despatch	Schooner	Brundrit & Co.	Runcorn	United Kingdom	For private owner.
Unknown date	Dragonfly	Steam yacht	Cochran & Co.	Birkenhead	United Kingdom	For private owner.
Unknown date	Drehna	Merchantman	Bremer Schiffbaugesellschaft	Vegesack	Germany	For private owner.
Unknown date	Earl of Cardigan	Merchantman	Smith & Stevenson	Great Grimsby	United Kingdom	For private owner.
Unknown date	Ebbe	Steamboat	Bremer Schiffbaugesellschaft	Vegesack	Germany	For private owner.
Unknown date	Eddystone	Merchantman	Caledon Shipbuilding & Engineering Co. Ltd.	Dundee	United Kingdom	For Clyde Shipping Company.
Unknown date	Elbe	Steamship	Schiffswerft von Henry Koch	Lũbeck	Germany	For private owner.
Unknown date	Electra	Steam trawler	Messrs. Cook, Welton & Gemmell	Hull	United Kingdom	For Messrs. F. & T. Ross.
Unknown date	Epato	Steamboat	William Dickinson	Birkenhead	United Kingdom	For private owner.
Unknown date	Euphrates	Steam trawler	W. B. Thompson	Dundee	United Kingdom	For T. Hawling.
Unknown date	Europe	Merchantman	Messrs. Edwards & Symes	Cubitt Town	United Kingdom	For private owner.
Unknown date	Euskaro	Merchantman	Robert Thompson & Sons	Sunderland	United Kingdom	For M. M. de Arrotegui.
Unknown date	Experience	Steam yacht	Messrs. Beesley & Sons	Barrow-in-Furness	United Kingdom	For private owner.
Unknown date	Feldtvebel	Steamboat	W. Crichton & Co.	Åbo	(Russian Empire) Grand Duchy of Finland	For private owner.
Unknown date	Feuerwerker	Steamboat	W. Crichton & Co.	Åbo	(Russian Empire) Grand Duchy of Finland	For private owner.
Unknown date	Finland	Steamship	Messrs. A. M'Millan & Co.	Dumbarton	United Kingdom	For Messrs. Donald Currie & Co.
Unknown date	Fleetwing	Steamboat	Miller, Tuff & Rouse	Hammersmith	United Kingdom	For private owner.
Unknown date	Florence	Tug	Cochran & Co.	Birkenhead	United Kingdom	For private owner.
Unknown date	Fluth	Steamboat	Bremer Schiffbaugesellschaft	Vegesack	Germany	For private owner.
Unknown date	Foon	Lifeboat	Forrest & Son	Limehouse or Millwall	United Kingdom	For Royal National Lifeboat Institution.
Unknown date	Francia	Steamship	Reiherstieg Schiffswerfte & Maschinenfabrik	Hamburg	Germany	For private owner.
Unknown date	Fred Carter	Merchantman	Thomas Campbell	Great Grimsby	United Kingdom	For private owner.
Unknown date	Friesland	Steamship	Koninklijke Fabriek Van Stoom en Andere	Amsterdam	Netherlands	For private owner.
Unknown date	Gargelle	Steamboat	Miller, Tuff & Rouse	Hammersmith	United Kingdom	For private owner.
Unknown date	Gertrud Woermann	Steamship	Stettiner Maschinenbau	Bredow	Germany	For private owner.
Unknown date	Gilcruix	Merchantman	Whitehaven Shipbuilding Co., Limited	Whitehaven	United Kingdom	For private owner.
Unknown date	Giorgio Batta Savarello	Steamship	Messrs. Wigham, Richardson & Co.	Low Walker	United Kingdom	For private owner.
Unknown date	Great Eastern	Steamboat	Miller, Tuff & Rouse	Hammersmith	United Kingdom	For private owner.
Unknown date	Greystone	Lifeboat	Forrest & Son	Limehouse or Millwall	United Kingdom	For Royal National Lifeboat Institution.
Unknown date	Hafis	Steamship	Messrs. R. & W. Hawthorn, Leslie & Co.	Hebburn	United Kingdom	For private owner.
Unknown date	Happy Return	Merchantman	Smith & Stevenson	Great Grimsby	United Kingdom	For private owner.
Unknown date	Henriette H.	Merchantman	James Laing	Sunderland	United Kingdom	For Maurice J. de Hart.
Unknown date	Henry	Lighter	W. S. Cumming	Glasgow	United Kingdom	For private owner.
Unknown date	H. K. Bedford	Steamboat		Jeffersonville, Indiana	United States	For private owner.
Unknown date	Holland	Steambboat	Earle's Shipbuilding and Engineering Co., Limited	Hull	United Kingdom	For private owner.
Unknown date	Holland	Steamship	Koninklijke Fabriek Van Stoom en Andere	Amsterdam	Netherlands	For private owner.
Unknown date	Hope	Steam trawler	Cook, Welton & Gemmell	Kingston upon Hull	United Kingdom	For private owner.
Unknown date	Hornet	tug	Day, Summers & Co.	Southampton	United Kingdom	For private owner.
Unknown date	Humber	Tug	Baltic Engine Works	Hull	United Kingdom	For J. E Cooper.
Unknown date	I	Steamboat	Messrs. Hawthorns & Co.	Leith	United Kingdom	For private owner.
Unknown date	Ibis	Paddle steamer	Fairfield Shipbuilding and Engineering	Govan	United Kingdom	For British Government.
Unknown date	Ina Mactavish	Steamship	Burrell & Son	Glasgow	United Kingdom	For private owner.
Unknown date	Ilma	Merchantman	Grangemouth Dockyard Company	Grangemouth	United Kingdom	For private owner.
Unknown date	India	Barge	Messrs. Edwards & Symes	Cubitt Town	United Kingdom	For private owner.
Unknown date	Industrie II	Steamship	Koninklijke Maatschappij de Schelde	Vlissingen	Netherlands	For private owner.
Unknown date	Innnapuna	Steamboat	Simpson & Denison	Dartmouth	United Kingdom	For private owner.
Unknown date	Ismail	Torpedo boat	Nikolayev Shipyard	Nikolayev	Russia	For Imperial Russian Navy.
Unknown date	James Arthur	Merchantman	Messrs. J. M'Arthur & Co.	Abbotsinch	United Kingdom	For private owner.
Unknown date	Jane Stephenson	Merchantman	Smith & Stevenson	Great Grimsby	United Kingdom	For private owner.
Unknown date	Jeanette	Steam yacht	Cochran & Co.	Birkenhead	United Kingdom	For private owner.
Unknown date	Jeanie	Steam launch	Ross & Duncan	Whitefield (Govan)	United Kingdom	For private owner.
Unknown date	Jehovah Jireh	Merchantman	Smith & Stevenson	Great Grimsby	United Kingdom	For private owner.
Unknown date	John Guzzwell	Fishing trawler	John Bell	Great Grimsby	United Kingdom	For Henry Brusey.
Unknown date	Kahu	Steamship	H. S. Edwards & Son	Howden-on-Tyne	United Kingdom	For private owner.
Unknown date	Kanal	Steamship	Flensburger Schiffbau-Gesellschaft	Flensburg	Germany	For private owner.
Unknown date	Kashejee	Steamship	Messrs. Napier, Shanks & Bell	Yoker	United Kingdom	For private owner.
Unknown date	Kesteven	Steamboat	Earle's Shipbuilding and Engineering Co., Limited	Hull	United Kingdom	For private owner.
Unknown date	Klara	Steamship	Messrs. Wigham, Richardson & Co.	Low Walker	United Kingdom	For private owner.
Unknown date	Konstantin	Steamship	Motala Mekaniska Verkstads	Motala	Sweden	For private owner.
Unknown date	La Dives	Paddle steamer	Koninklijke Maatschappij de Schelde	Vlissingen	Netherlands	For private owner.
Unknown date	Ladoga	Steamboat	W. Crichton & Co.	Åbo	(Russian Empire) Grand Duchy of Finland	For private owner.
Unknown date	Ladylove	Steamboat	Hewitt & Co	Barking	United Kingdom	For private owner.
Unknown date	Lauga	Steamship	Cockerill Company	Hoboken	Belgium	For private owner.
Unknown date	La Victoricie	Steamship	Messrs. Laird Bros.	Birkenhead	United Kingdom	For private owner.
Unknown date	Leif	Steamboat	Marten, Olsen & Co	Laksevåg	Norway	For private owner.
Unknown date	Lilla	Merchantman	Rostocker Actiengesellschaft für Schiff & Maschinenbau	Rostock	Germany	For private owner.
Unknown date	Limande	Steamship	Laird Bros.	Birkenhead	United Kingdom	For private owner.
Unknown date	Lindsey	Steamboat	Earle's Shipbuilding and Engineering Co., Limited	Hull	United Kingdom	For private owner.
Unknown date	Linnet	Steam trawler	Messrs. Cook, Welton & Gemmell	Hull	United Kingdom	For Messrs. Pickering & Haldane.
Unknown date	Little Emma	Merchantman	Smith & Stevenson	Great Grimsby	United Kingdom	For private owner.
Unknown date	Little Lizzie	Merchantman	Smith & Stevenson	Great Grimsby	United Kingdom	For private owner.
Unknown date	Little Violet	Steamboat	Messrs. Ramage & Ferguson	Leith	United Kingdom	For private owner.
Unknown date	Little Wave	Merchantman	Smith & Stevenson	Great Grimsby	United Kingdom	For private owner.
Unknown date	Little Wonder	Merchantman	Date & Sons	Kingsbridge	United Kingdom	For private owner.
Unknown date	Liverpool	Tug	Cochran & Co.	Birkenhead	United Kingdom	For private owner.
Unknown date	Lola	Steamboat	Simpson & Denison	Dartmouth	United Kingdom	For private owner.
Unknown date	Looch	Steamship	Messrs. R. & W. Hawthorn, Leslie & Co.	Hebburn	United Kingdom	For private owner.
Unknown date	Lübeck	Steamship	Stettiner Maschinenbau	Bredow	Germany	For private owner.
Unknown date	Lucy Hammond	Steam barge	Alley & MacLellan	Polmadie	United Kingdom	For private owner.
Unknown date	Ludwig Possehl	Steamship	Flensburger Schiffbau-Gesellschaft	Flensburg	Germany	For private owner.
Unknown date	Lulu Bohlen	Steamship	Blohm & Voss	Hamburg	Germany	For private owner.
Unknown date	Lytham	Lifeboat	Forrest & Son	Limehouse or Millwall	United Kingdom	For Royal National Lifeboat Institution.
Unknown date	Mandjur	Steamship	Burmeister & Wain	Copenhagen	Denmark	For private owner.
Unknown date	Man of War	Steamship	Schiff und Maschinenbau AG	Kiel	Germany	For private owner.
Unknown date	Marquis of Huntington	Steamship	Messrs. R. & W. Hawthorn, Leslie & Co.	Hebburn	United Kingdom	For private owner.
Unknown date	Mars	Steamboat	Motala Mekaniska Verkstads	Motala	Sweden	For private owner.
Unknown date	Mary	Steamboat	Messrs. J. M'Arthur & Co.	Abbotsinch	United Kingdom	For private owner.
Unknown date	Masterpiece	Merchantman	Smith & Stevenson	Great Grimsby	United Kingdom	For private owner.
Unknown date	Maud	Whaler			United Kingdom	For private owner.
Unknown date	Mayfly	Steamboat	W. White & Sons	West Cowes	United Kingdom	For private owner.
Unknown date	Mera	Steam yacht	Day, Summers & Co.	Southampton	United Kingdom	For private owner.
Unknown date	Merry Duchess	Steam yacht	Cochran & Co.	Birkenhead	United Kingdom	For private owner.
Unknown date	Mignonette	Fishing trawler	John Bell	Great Grimsby	United Kingdom	For Charles Bealey.
Unknown date	Milverton	Merchantman	Messrs. Oswald, Mordaunt & Co.	Southampton	United Kingdom	For private owner.
Unknown date	Mina	Merchantman	James & John Hay	Kirkintilloch	United Kingdom	For private owner.
Unknown date	Mirror	Steamship	Robert Napier and Sons	Govan	United Kingdom	For private owner.
Unknown date	Moma	Steamboat	William Dickinson	Birkenhead	United Kingdom	For private owner.
Unknown date	Montana	Steamship	Sunderland Shipbuilding Co. Ltd.	Sunderland	United Kingdom	For private owner.
Unknown date	Moscards	Steamboat	Messrs. Blackwood & Gordon	Port Glasgow	United Kingdom	For private owner.
Unknown date	Neptune	Steamship	Messrs. Wigham, Richardson & Co.	Low Walker	United Kingdom	For private owner.
Unknown date	My Pretty Love	Merchantman	Thomas Campbell	Great Grimsby	United Kingdom	For private owner.
Unknown date	Mystery	Fishing trawler	A. C. Brown	Tottenville, New York	United States	For private owner.
Unknown date	Nantucket	Paddle steamer		Wilmington, Delaware	United States	For New Bedford, Martha's Vineyard and Nantucket Steamboat Co.
Unknown date	Narrabeen	Paddle steamer	Mort's Dock	Sydney	New South Wales	For Port Jackson Steamship Company.
Unknown date	Nelaug	Steamboat	Akers Mekaniske Verksted	Christiania	Norway	For private owner.
Unknown date	Neuwerk	Steamship	Reiherstieg Schiffswerfte & Maschinenfabrik	Hamburg	Germany	For private owner.
Unknown date	New Quay	Lifeboat	Forrest & Son	Limehouse or Millwall	United Kingdom	For Royal National Lifeboat Institution.
Unknown date	Nominoé	Brig	Ateliers & Chantiers Dubigeon	Nantes	France	For private owner.
Unknown date	Olaf Kyrre	Steamship	Marten, Olsen & Co	Laksevåg	Norway	For private owner.
Unknown date	Orstria	Steamship	Messrs. Laird Bros.	Birkenhead	United Kingdom	For private owner.
Unknown date	Ostersjön	Steamship	Schiffswerft von Henry Koch	Lũbeck	Germany	For private owner.
Unknown date	Pansy	Merchantman	Cottingham Brothers	Goole	United Kingdom	For private owner.
Unknown date	Patagonia	Cruiser	Stabilimento Tecnico Triestino	Trieste	Austria-Hungary	For Argentine Navy.
Unknown date	Pathfinder	Steam yacht	Messrs. Edwards & Symes	Cubitt Town	United Kingdom	For private owner.
Unknown date	Paumbben	Steamship	Messrs. Archibald M'Millan & Son	Dumbarton	United Kingdom	For private owner.
Unknown date	Percy Russell	Merchantman	Smith & Stevenson	Great Grimsby	United Kingdom	For private owner.
Unknown date	Pinega	Steamship	Cockerill Company	Hoboken	Belgium	For private owner.
Unknown date	Pioneer	Steamship	Messrs. M. Pearse & Co.	Stockton-on-Tees	United Kingdom	For private owner.
Unknown date	Pioneer	Paddle steamer	Messrs. Edwards & Symes	Cubitt Town	United Kingdom	For private owner.
Unknown date	Pollux	Sealer	Ole Martin Olesen	Arendal	Norway	For Axel Herlofsen.
Unknown date	Polo	tug	Messrs. William Swan & Co.	Maryport	United Kingdom	For Luis de Stein.
Unknown date	Polymnia	Merchantman	Blohm & Voss	Hamburg	Germany	For private owner.
Unknown date	Port Pirie	Steamship	Messrs. R. & W. Hawthorn, Leslie & Co.	Hebburn	United Kingdom	For private owner.
Unknown date	Posthonstock	Lifeboat	Forrest & Son	Limehouse or Millwall	United Kingdom	For Royal National Lifeboat Institution.
Unknown date	Preussen	Steamship	Stettiner Maschinenbau	Bredow	Germany	For private owner.
Unknown date	Prince of Wales	Paddle steamer	Hepple & Co.	North Shields	United Kingdom	For private owner.
Unknown date	Princesse Josephine	Steamship	Cockerill Company	Hoboken	Belgium	For private owner.
Unknown date	Psyche	Steamboat	E. Clarke & Co.	Brinscombe	United Kingdom	For private owner.
Unknown date	Pulio Teodoro	Merchantman	Flensburger Schiffbau-Gesellschaft	Flensburg	Germany	For private owner.
Unknown date	Quieto	Steamship	George Howaldt	Kiel	Germany	For private owner.
Unknown date	Racer	Tug	Messrs. Carr & Company Limited	Newcastle upon Tyne	United Kingdom	For Messrs. Watkins & Co.
Unknown date	Rainbow	Fishing trawler	John Bell	Great Grimsby	United Kingdom	For Ormund Halvorson.
Unknown date	Ravendale	Merchantman	T. & G. Collinson	Great Grimsby	United Kingdom	For private owner.
Unknown date	Rebecca Sleight	Merchantman	Smith & Stevenson	Great Grimsby	United Kingdom	For private owner.
Unknown date	Rescue	Steamboat	Messrs. D. Allan & Co.	Granton	United Kingdom	For private owner.
Unknown date	Resolute	Steamboat	Messrs. J. M'Kenzie & Co.	Leith	United Kingdom	For private owner.
Unknown date	Rhionnagur-mara	Steam yacht	Messrs. John Reid & Co.	Port Glasgow	United Kingdom	For A. J. Pirie.
Unknown date	Rio Mapure	Steamboat	E. Clarke & Co.	Brinscombe	United Kingdom	For private owner.
Unknown date	Risano	Steamship	George Howaldt	Kiel	Germany	For private owner.
Unknown date	Rose	Steam trawler	Cook, Welton & Gemmell	Hull	United Kingdom	For private owner.
Unknown date	Roseland	Steamboat	Cox & Co.	Falmouth	United Kingdom	For St. Mawes Steam Packet Company.
Unknown date	Rossilnig	Steamboat	W. Crichton & Co.	Åbo	(Russian Empire) Grand Duchy of Finland	For private owner.
Unknown date	Sachsen	Steamship	Stettiner Maschinenbau	Bredow	Germany	For private owner.
Unknown date	Samana	Steamship	W. H. Potter & Sons	Liverpool	United Kingdom	For private owner.
Unknown date	San Giorgio	Steamship	Messrs. Oswald, Mordaunt & Co.	Southampton	United Kingdom	For private owner.
Unknown date	Sappho	Ferry	New England Shipbuilding Company	Bath, Maine	United States	For private owner.
Unknown date	Saukim	Merchantman	Messsrs. Russell & Co.	Cartsdyke	United Kingdom	For private owner.
Unknown date	Scorpion	Steamboat	Miller, Tuff & Rouse	Hammersmith	United Kingdom	For private owner.
Unknown date	Scotia	Steamship	James & John Hay	Kirkintilloch	United Kingdom	For private owner.
Unknown date	Seascale	Lifeboat	Forrest & Son	Limehouse or Millwall	United Kingdom	For Royal National Lifeboat Institution.
Unknown date	Sherringham	Lifeboat	Forrest & Son	Limehouse or Millwall	United Kingdom	For Royal National Lifeboat Institution.
Unknown date	Silvery Wave	Merchantman	Cottingham Brothers	Goole	United Kingdom	For private owner.
Unknown date	Silvia	Steamship	Flensburger Schiffbau-Gesellschaft	Flensburg	Germany	For private owner.
Unknown date	Sirius	Steamboat	Motala Mekaniska Verkstads	Motala	Sweden	For private owner.
Unknown date	Spark	Electric boat	Royal Gunpowder Factory	Waltham Abbey	United Kingdom	For Royal Gunpowder Factory.
Unknown date	Spirit of the Deep	Merchantman	Smith & Stevenson	Great Grimsby	United Kingdom	For private owner.
Unknown date	Stephan	Steamboat	George Howaldt	Kiel	Germany	For private owner.
Unknown date	Stephenson	Paddle steamer	Hepple & Co.	North Shields	United Kingdom	For private owner.
Unknown date	Stettin	Steamship	Stettiner Maschinenbau	Bredow	Germany	For private owner.
Unknown date	St. Mary's Bay	Merchantman	Messsrs. Russell & Co.	Cartsdyke	United Kingdom	For private owner.
Unknown date	St. Seiriol	Steamship	C. S. Swan & Hunter	Wallsend	United Kingdom	For private owner.
Unknown date	Svea	Svea-class coastal defence ship			Sweden	For Royal Swedish Navy.
Unknown date	Tadri	Steamship	Grangemouth Dockyard Company	Grangemouth	United Kingdom	For private owner.
Unknown date	Taikoo	Merchantman	Messrs. Scott & Co.	Cartsdyke	United Kingdom	For private owner.
Unknown date	Talavera	Steamship	Joseph L. Thompson & Sons	Monkwearmouth	United Kingdom	For H. Scholefield & Son.
Unknown date	Talsiman	Steamship	Messrs. R. & W. Hawthorn, Leslie & Co.	Hebburn	United Kingdom	For Ocean Steamship Company.
Unknown date	Tanshorn	Steamboat	Akers Mekaniske Verksted	Christiania	Norway	For private owner.
Unknown date	Teresa	Steamship	Grangemouth Dockyard Company	Grangemouth	United Kingdom	For J. W. Adamson.
Unknown date	The Appleby	Merchantman	T. & G. Collinson	Great Grimsby	United Kingdom	For private owner.
Unknown date	Thomas Joliffe	Tug	Messrs. John Readhead & Co.	South Shields	United Kingdom	For Messrs. W. & T. Joliffe.
Unknown date	Thor	Steamship	Burmeister & Wain	Copenhagen	Denmark	For private owner.
Unknown date	Three Sisters	Sternwheeler	Oregon Development Company	Portland, Oregon	United States	For Oregon Pacific Railroad Company.
Unknown date	Triangelia	Steamboat	Marten, Olsen & Co	Laksevåg	Norway	For private owner.
Unknown date	Toldkrydaer No. 1	Steamboat	Burmeister & Wain	Copenhagen	Denmark	For private owner.
Unknown date	Toldkrydaer No. 2	Steamboat	Burmeister & Wain	Copenhagen	Denmark	For private owner.
Unknown date	Trabhaldour	Merchantman	Barrow Ship Building Co. Ltd.	Barrow-in-Furness	United Kingdom	For private owner.
Unknown date	Tumo	Steamboat	Akers Mekaniske Verksted	Christiania	Norway	For private owner.
Unknown date	Twin Screw	Steam yacht	Cochran & Co.	Birkenhead	United Kingdom	For private owner.
Unknown date	Umginto	Steamship	James Laing	Sunderland	United Kingdom	For private owner.
Unknown date	Umrat	Steam yacht	Cochran & Co.	Birkenhead	United Kingdom	For private owner.
Unknown date	Umzinto	Merchantman	James Laing	Sunderland	United Kingdom	For Bullard, King & Co. Ltd.
Unknown date	Vaga	Steamship	Cockerill Company	Hoboken	Belgium	For private owner.
Unknown date	Valdemar	Steamship	Burmeister & Wain	Copenhagen	Denmark	For private owner.
Unknown date	Valiseucus	Steamship	Messrs. R. & W. Hawthorn, Leslie & Co.	Hebburn	United Kingdom	For Ocean Steamship Company.
Unknown date	Vernon	Steamship	James P. Smith	Chicago, Illinois	United States	For Alfred Booth.
Unknown date	Vesta	Merchantman	S. P. Austin & Son	Sunderland	United Kingdom	For private owner.
Unknown date	Victoria	Steamboat	Flensburger Schiffbau-Gesellschaft	Flensburg	Germany	For private owner.
Unknown date	Viktoria	Steamship	Flensburger Schiffbau-Gesellschaft	Flensburg	Germany	For "Föhrer Steamship Company".
Unknown date	Ville de Bruxelles	Steamship	Cockerill Company	Hoboken	Belgium	For private owner.
Unknown date	Ville de Douvres	Steamship	Cockerill Company	Hoboken	Belgium	For private owner.
Unknown date	Vivia	Sailboat	Barrow Ship Building Co. Ltd.	Barrow-in-Furness	United Kingdom	For private owner.
Unknown date	Whimbrel	Fishing trawler	John Bell	Great Grimsby	United Kingdom	For Alexander W. Drury.
Unknown date	Whithom	Lifeboat	Forrest & Son	Limehouse or Millwall	United Kingdom	For Royal National Lifeboat Institution.
Unknown date	Wicklow	Lifeboat	Forrest & Son	Limehouse or Millwall	United Kingdom	For Royal National Lifeboat Institution.
Unknown date	William Bennett	Lifeboat	Forrest & Son	Limehouse	United Kingdom	For Royal National Lifeboat Institution.
Unknown date	William Stephenson	Merchantman	Smith & Stevenson	Great Grimsby	United Kingdom	For private owner.
Unknown date	W. I. Radcliffe	Steamship	Palmers Shipbuilding and Iron Company	Jarrow	United Kingdom	For private owner.
Unknown date	Witham	Steamship	Earle's Shipbuilding and Engineering Co., Limited	Hull	United Kingdom	For private owner.
Unknown date	Young Herbert	Fishing trawler	John Bell	Great Grimsby	United Kingdom	For Henry Coxson.
Unknown date	Ysabel	Steamship	Blohm & Voss	Hamburg	Germany	For private owner.
Unknown date	Zampa	Steam yacht	Cochran & Co.	Birkenhead	United Kingdom	For private owner.
Unknown date	Zenobia	Humber Keel	William Bayley & Sons	Ipswich	United Kingdom	For private owner.
Unknown date	Zuid Holland	Steamship	Nederlandsche Stoomboot Maatschappij	Rotterdam	Netherlands	For private owner.
Unknown date	No. 1	Despatch boat	Day, Summers & Co.	Southampton	United Kingdom	For foreign owner.
Unknown date	No. 2	Despatch boat	Day, Summers & Co.	Southampton	United Kingdom	For foreign owner.
Unknown date	No. 3	Despatch boat	Day, Summers & Co.	Southampton	United Kingdom	For foreign owner.
Unknown date	No. 22	Lighter	W. S. Cumming	Glasgow	United Kingdom	For private owner.
Unknown date	No. 23	Lighter	W. S. Cumming	Glasgow	United Kingdom	For private owner.
Unknown date	No. 24	Troopship	"The Elsinore Iron Shipbuilding & Engineering Co."	Helsingør	Denmark	For Danish Government.
Unknown date	No. 25	Troopship	"The Elsinore Iron Shipbuilding & Engineering Co."	Helsingør	Denmark	For Danish Government.
Unknown date	No. 30	Barge	Alley & MacLellan	Polmadie	United Kingdom	For private owner.
Unknown date	No. 32	Barge	Alley & MacLellan	Polmadie	United Kingdom	For private owner.
Unknown date	No. 33	Barge	Alley & MacLellan	Polmadie	United Kingdom	For private owner.
Unknown date	No. 34	Barge	Alley & MacLellan	Polmadie	United Kingdom	For private owner.
Unknown date	No. 35	Barge	Alley & MacLellan	Polmadie	United Kingdom	For private owner.
Unknown date	No. 36	Barge	Alley & MacLellan	Polmadie	United Kingdom	For private owner.
Unknown date	No. 37	Barge	Alley & MacLellan	Polmadie	United Kingdom	For private owner.
Unknown date	No. 37	Steamboat	Messrs. J. M'Arthur & Co.	Abbotsinch	United Kingdom	For private owner.
Unknown date	No. 38	Barge	Alley & MacLellan	Polmadie	United Kingdom	For private owner.
Unknown date	No. 39	Barge	Alley & MacLellan	Polmadie	United Kingdom	For private owner.
Unknown date	No. 40	Barge	Alley & MacLellan	Polmadie	United Kingdom	For private owner.
Unknown date	No. 41	Barge	Alley & MacLellan	Polmadie	United Kingdom	For private owner.
Unknown date	No. 41	Steamship	Messrs. J. M'Arthur & Co.	Abbotsinch	United Kingdom	For private owner.
Unknown date	No. 42	Steamship	Messrs. J. M'Arthur & Co.	Abbotsinch	United Kingdom	For private owner.
Unknown date	No. 45	Steamship	Messrs. J. M'Arthur & Co.	Abbotsinch	United Kingdom	For private owner.
Unknown date	No. 61	Steamship	Tyne Iron Shipbuilding Co., Limited	Willington Quay	United Kingdom	For private owner.
Unknown date	No. 146	Lighter	George Howaldt	Kiel	Germany	For private owner.
Unknown date	No. 150	Lighter	George Howaldt	Kiel	Germany	For private owner.
Unknown date	No. 151	Lighter	George Howaldt	Kiel	Germany	For private owner.
Unknown date	No. 152	Lighter	George Howaldt	Kiel	Germany	For private owner.
Unknown date	No. 173	Steamboat	William Dickinson	Birkenhead	United Kingdom	For private owner.
Unknown date	No. 174	Steamboat	Stettiner Maschinenbau	Bredow	Germany	For private owner.
Unknown date	No. 174	Steamboat	William Dickinson	Birkenhead	United Kingdom	For private owner.
Unknown date	No. 175	Steamboat	William Dickinson	Birkenhead	United Kingdom	For private owner.
Unknown date	No. 176	Steamboat	William Dickinson	Birkenhead	United Kingdom	For private owner.
Unknown date	No. 177	Steamboat	William Dickinson	Birkenhead	United Kingdom	For private owner.
Unknown date	No. 178	Steamboat	Stettiner Maschinenbau	Bredow	Germany	For private owner.
Unknown date	No. 178	Steamboat	William Dickinson	Birkenhead	United Kingdom	For private owner.
Unknown date	No. 179	Steamboat	William Dickinson	Birkenhead	United Kingdom	For private owner.
Unknown date	No. 180	Steamboat	William Dickinson	Birkenhead	United Kingdom	For private owner.
Unknown date	No. 181	Steamboat	William Dickinson	Birkenhead	United Kingdom	For private owner.
Unknown date	No. 185	Barge	Messrs. Edwards & Symes	Cubitt Town	United Kingdom	For private owner.
Unknown date	No. 186	Barge	Messrs. Edwards & Symes	Cubitt Town	United Kingdom	For private owner.
Unknown date	No. 187	Merchantman	Messrs. Edwards & Symes	Cubitt Town	United Kingdom	For private owner.
Unknown date	No. 301	Steamship	Earle's Shipbuilding and Engineering Co., Limited	Hull	United Kingdom	For private owner.
Unknown date	No. 866	Steamboat	W. Crichton & Co.	Åbo	(Russian Empire) Grand Duchy of Finland	For private owner.
Unknown date	4 unnamed vessels	Lighters	Cochran & Co.	Birkenhead	United Kingdom	For private owners.
Unknown date	7 unnamed vessels	Pinnaces	Cochran & Co.	Birkenhead	United Kingdom	For private owners.
Unknown date	3 unnamed vessels	Barges	Cochran & Co.	Birkenhead	United Kingdom	For private owners.
Unknown date	Unnamed	Tug	Cochran & Co.	Birkenhead	United Kingdom	For private owner.
Unknown date	Unnamed	Steamboat	W. White & Sons	West Cowes	United Kingdom	For Baron Montagu.
Unknown date	3 unnamed vessels	Paddle steamers	Messrs. Laird Bros.	Birkenhead	United Kingdom	For private owners.
Unknown date	3 unnamed vessels	Lighters	Messrs. Laird Bros.	Birkenhead	United Kingdom	For private owners.
Unknown date	Unnamed	Tender	Messrs. Edwards & Symes	Cubitt Town	United Kingdom	For private owner.
Unknown date	Unnamed	Lightship	Hill & Sons	Bristol	United Kingdom	For Trinity House.
Unknown date	6 Unnamed vessels	Barges	Earle's Shipbuilding and Engineering Co., Limited	Hull	United Kingdom	For private owners.
Unknown date	3 unnamed vessels	Barges	Bute Shipbuilding, Engineering, & Dry Dock Co.	Cardiff	United Kingdom	For private owners.
Unknown date	10 unnamed vessels	Steam launches	Simpson & Denison	Dartmouth	United Kingdom	For private owners.
Unknown date	Unnamed	Torpedo boat	Yarrow & Co.	Poplar	United Kingdom	For Royal Navy.
Unknown date	4 unnamed vessels	Torpedo boats	Yarrow & Co.	Poplar	United Kingdom	For foreign owners.
Unknown date	Unnamed	Steam launch	Yarrow & Co.	Poplar	United Kingdom	For private owner.
Unknown date	2 unnamed vessels	Sternwheelers	Yarrow & Co.	Poplar	United Kingdom	For private owners.
Unknown date	Unnamed	Sternwheeler	Forrest & Son	Limehouse or Millwall	United Kingdom	For private owner.
Unknown date	Unnamed	Steam launch	Forrest & Son	Limehouse or Millwall	United Kingdom	For private owner.
Unknown date	3 unnamed vessels	Hopper barges	H. S. Edwards & Son	Howden-on-Tyne	United Kingdom	For private owners.
Unknown date	Unnamed	Dredger	Messrs. Samuda Bros.	Poplar	United Kingdom	For private owner.
Unknown date	4 unnamed vessels	Steamships	Messrs. Samuda Bros.	Poplar	United Kingdom	For private owners.
Unknown date	6 unnamed vessels	Barges	Ross & Duncan	Whitefield (Govan)	United Kingdom	For private owners.
Unknown date	Unnamed	Steam launch	Robert Duncan & Co.	Port Glasgow	United Kingdom	For private owner.
Unknown date	Unnamed	Steam lighter	Messrs. Scott & Co.	Bowling	United Kingdom	For private owner.
Unknown date	Unnamed	Barge	Messrs. Murdoch & Murray	Port Glasgow	United Kingdom	For private owner.
Unknown date	Unnamed	Paddle steamer	Messrs. Blackwood & Gordon	Port Glasgow	United Kingdom	For private owner.
Unknown date	2 unnamed vessels	Steamships	Cockerill Company	Hoboken	Belgium	For private owners.
Unknown date	21 Unnamed vessels	Launches	W. Crichton & Co.	Åbo	(Russian Empire) Grand Duchy of Finland	For private owners.
Unknown date	4 unnamed vessels	Torpedo boats	W. Crichton & Co.	Åbo	(Russian Empire) Grand Duchy of Finland	For Imperial Russian Navy.
Unknown date	2 unnamed vessels	Steamships	Fairfield Engineering and Shipbuilding Co. Ltd.	Fairfield	United Kingdom	For private owners.
Unknown date	2 unnamed vessels	Gunboats	Fairfield Engineering and Shipbuilding Co. Ltd.	Fairfield	United Kingdom	For British Colonial governments.
