= Albay (disambiguation) =

Albay is a province of the Philippines.

Albay may also refer to:

- Albay Gulf, a gulf in the southern part of Luzon island, Philippines
- USS Albay (1886), a small gunboat built in 1886 for the Spanish colonial government of the Philippines
- Albay, Turkish military rank corresponding to colonel (NATO OF-5)

== People with the surname ==
- R. Kan Albay (born 1975), Belgian film director
