= List of shipwrecks in November 1889 =

The list of shipwrecks in November 1889 includes ships sunk, foundered, grounded, or otherwise lost during November 1889.

== 1 November ==
List of shipwrecks: 1 November 1889
Ship	State	Description
Arethusa	United Kingdom	The steamship ran aground at Maassluis, South Holland, Netherlands. She was on a voyage from Odessa, Russia to Rotterdam, South Holland.
Baltic	Norway	The brigantine was run into by the steamship Gascony (United Kingdom at Ayr, United Kingdom and was damaged.
Batavier	United Kingdom	The barge broke in two and sank off the East Goodwin Lightship ( Trinity House). Her five crew were rescued. She was on being towed from Antwerp to Portishead, Somerset by the tug White Rose (United Kingdom).
Elfrida	United Kingdom	The steamship ran aground at Penarth, Glamorgan. She was refloated.
Gascony	United Kingdom	The steamship broke from her moorings at Ayr. She struck the quayside bow and stern and was damaged.
Glanmire	United Kingdom	The steamship sprang a leak off the Mine Head Lighthouse, County Waterford. Her five passengers were taken off by the Ballinacoutry Lifeboat William Dunville ( Royal National Lifeboat Institution). Her 25 crew took to the boats. Glanmire was beached in Dungarvan Bay. She was on a voyage from Liverpool, Lancashire to Cork.
Maitlands	United Kingdom	The steamship ran aground at Stettin, Germany. She was on a voyage from Middlesbrough, Yorkshire to Stettin. She was refloated.
Margery	United Kingdom	The schooner was driven ashore and wrecked in Robin Hoods Bay. Her crew were rescued. She was on a voyage from Hartlepool, County Durham to Scarborough, Yorkshire.
Mithraale	Greece	The brigantine was wrecked at Piombino, Italy. Her crew were rescued.
Nieles	Sweden	The schooner collided with the smack Clio (United Kingdom) and was damaged. Nieles was on a voyage from Hull, Yorkshire to Norrköping. She put in to Grimsby, Lincolnshire, United Kingdom.
Ocean	United Kingdom	The schooner struck the pier at Arbroath, Forfarshire and was severely damaged. Her crew were rescued.
Peep o' Day	United Kingdom	The brigantine collided with the barque Ancona (Flag unknown) and drove ashore on Holy Island, Ayrshire. Her crew were rescued.
Prudent	France	The barque was driven ashore on Terschelling, Friesland, Netherlands. She was refloated with assistance.
Rheinland	Germany	The steamship was driven ashore. She was on a voyage from Dordrecht, South Holland, Netherlands to a port in Dorset, United Kingdom.
Roeicliff	United Kingdom	The schooner was driven ashore at Troon, Ayrshire. Her six crew were rescued by the Troon Lifeboat Alexander Munroe ( Royal National Lifeboat Institution). Roeicliff was on a voyage from Porsgrund, Norway to Troon.
Windward	United Kingdom	The ketch was driven ashore at Holywood, County Down.
Portrush Lifeboat	Royal National Lifeboat Institution	The lifeboat capsized three times whilst going to the aid of a schooner in distress with the loss of three of her crew. She came ashore near Portballintrae, County Antrim.
Unnamed	United Kingdom	The schooner was run into by the steamship Exchange (United Kingdom) and sank in the River Mersey with the loss of all five crew.
Unnamed	United Kingdom	The ship was driven ashore on Holy Island, Ayrshire. Her crew were rescued.

== 3 November ==
List of shipwrecks: 3 November 1889
Ship	State	Description
Abergeldie	United Kingdom	The ship collided with the steamship Eden (United Kingdom) and sank off the coast of Norway. Her crew were rescued by Eden. Abergeldie was on a voyage from London to Sundsvall, Sweden.

== 4 November ==
List of shipwrecks: 4 November 1889
Ship	State	Description
Alfred	United Kingdom	The smack was discovered abandoned in the English Channel 8 nautical miles (15 km) south west of St. Catherine's Point, Isle of Wight. She was towed in to Cowes, Isle of Wight.
Star of Hope	United Kingdom	The smack foundered off Dover, Kent.

== 5 November ==
List of shipwrecks: 5 November 1889
Ship	State	Description
Ramon de Larrinaga	Flag unknown	The steamship caught fire at Liverpool, Lancashire, United Kingdom. The fire was extinguished.

== 6 November ==
List of shipwrecks: 6 November 1889
Ship	State	Description
Lady Lincoln	United States	The schooner sank off Highland Lighthouse, Massachusetts. Her crew were rescued.
Tom	United Kingdom	The barge was run into by the steamship Ada (United Kingdom) and sank in the River Thames at Blackwall, London.

== 7 November ==
List of shipwrecks: 7 November 1889
Ship	State	Description
Arracan	Germany	The barque was run down and sunk off Bornholm, Denmark by a steamship. Her crew were rescued by the steamship Helene (Germany). Arracan was on a voyage from New York, United States to Danzig.
Elma	United Kingdom	The brigantine ran aground on The Shingles, off the Isle of Wight. She was on a voyage from Le Tréport, Seine-Inférieure, France to Dublin.
Lady Eglington, and Telesto	United Kingdom; Flag unknown	The steamships collided in the Seine and were damaged. They both put in to Havre le Grâce, Seine-Inférieure.
Lombard	United Kingdom	The steamship ran aground in the Bristol Channel. She was on a voyage from Alexandria, Egypt to Bristol, Gloucestershire. She was refloated and completed her voyage.
Nova Scotian	United Kingdom	The steamship was driven ashore at the mouth of the Patapsco River. She was on a voyage from Baltimore, Maryland, United States to Liverpool, Lancashire.

== 8 November ==
List of shipwrecks: 8 November 1889
Ship	State	Description
Queensmore	United Kingdom	The cargo ship caught fire in the Atlantic Ocean while on the return leg of her maiden voyage. An attempt was made to beach her in Dunmanus Bay but she struck the Bullig Reef and sank. The crew took to the ship's boats.
Santiago	United Kingdom	The steamship was destroyed by fire at sea. All 59 people on board were rescued by the full-rigged ship A. J. Fuller (United States). Santiago was on a voyage from New York to Hull, Yorkshire.

== 10 November ==
List of shipwrecks: 10 November 1889
Ship	State	Description
Congo	United Kingdom	The steamship ran aground in the Small Bitter Lake. She was refloated.

== 11 November ==
List of shipwrecks: 11 November 1889
Ship	State	Description
Black Watch	United Kingdom	The steamship foundered at sea. Her crew were rescued by the steamship Ben Voirlich (United Kingdom).
Greenwood	United Kingdom	The steamship was driven ashore at Redcar, Yorkshire. She was on a voyage from Bilbao, Spain to Middlesbrough, Yorkshire. She was refloated and towed in to Middlesbrough.
Larch	United Kingdom	The steamship was run into by the steamship Pilot (Flag unknown) off Cape Villano, Spain. Larch was beached at Las Arenas. She was refloated and towed in to Bilbao, where she arrived on 12 November in a severely damaged condition.
Martha	United Kingdom	The ship sprang a leak and sank at Widnes, Cheshire.

== 12 November ==
List of shipwrecks: 12 November 1889
Ship	State	Description
Durham	United Kingdom	The ferry collided with the steamship Sicilia (United Kingdom) at North Shields, Northumberland and was severely damaged.
Gassendi	United Kingdom	The steamship collided with the steamship Gothenburg City (Flag unknown) in the River Thames and was beached at Greenwich, London.
Sestos	United Kingdom	The ship ran aground at Usk, Monmouthshire.

== 13 November ==
List of shipwrecks: 13 November 1889
Ship	State	Description
European	United Kingdom	The steamship collided with the steamship Adler (Germany) at Hull, Yorkshire and was severely damaged. European was on a voyage from Amsterdam, North Holland, Netherlands to Hull.
Holt Hill	United Kingdom	The barque was wrecked on the island of St Paul in the south of the Indian Ocean. Her crew remained on the uninhabited island for eight days before they were rescued by the barque Cooring (South Australia). One crew member died. She was on a voyage from Rio de Janeiro, Brazil to Calcutta, India.
Midas	United Kingdom	The ship was driven ashore at Maceió, Brazil. She was on a voyage from Montevideo, Uruguay to Barbados. She was reflaoted with assistance on 16 November.

== 14 November ==
List of shipwrecks: 14 November 1889
Ship	State	Description
Antonietta	Italy	The brig was driven ashore at Orosei, Sardinia. Her crew were rescued.
Newbattle	United Kingdom	The steamship ran aground in the River Forth.
Therese	Netherlands	The ship departed from Pensacola, Florida, United States for Rotterdam, South Holland. No further trace, reported overdue.
Wylam	United Kingdom	The steamship was driven ashore at Honfleur, Manche, France.

== 15 November ==
List of shipwrecks: 15 November 1889
Ship	State	Description
Atlas	Norway	The barque was abandoned in the Atlantic Ocean (47°21′N 31°33′W). Her twelve crew were rescued by Marie (Flag unknown).
Delphin	Russia	The barque was wrecked on the Sanbacks Rock, in the Baltic Sea. Her crew were rescued. She was on a voyage from Ibiza, Spain to Uusikaupunki, Grand Duchy of Finland.
Unnamed	United Kingdom	The Mersey Flat was run into by the steamship Zancla (Flag unknown) and sank at Liverpool, Lancashire.

== 16 November ==
List of shipwrecks: 16 November 1889
Ship	State	Description
Arrow	United Kingdom	The steamship ran aground at Cardiff, Glamorgan.
Esk	United Kingdom	The steamship collided with the steamship Louisa H. (United Kingdom) in the River Tyne. Esk was on a voyage from Newcastle upon Tyne, Northumberland to Antwerp, Belgium, She put back to Newcastle upon Tyne.
Fearless	United States	The tug ran aground on the north spit of the Umpqua River and was wrecked with the loss of all eight people on board.
Hydra	United Kingdom	The steamship ran aground in the River Ouse at Goole, Yorkshire. She was on a voyage from Goole to Boulogne, Pas-de-Calais, Frances. She was refloated with the assistance of a tug and put back to Goole for repairs.
Lowestoft	United Kingdom	The barque was run into by the steamship Sindbad (United Kingdom) in the River Tyne and was severely damaged.
Sam Weller	United Kingdom	The steamship was driven ashore on Heligoland. She was on a voyage from Sulina, Romania to Hamburg, Germany. She was refloated with assistance.

== 18 November ==
List of shipwrecks: 18 November 1889
Ship	State	Description
Constantine	United Kingdom	The steamship was driven ashore 3 nautical miles (5.6 km) south of Blyth, Northumberland. She was on a voyage from London to Blyth.
Fernbrook	United Kingdom	The steamship was driven ashore near Lynton, Devon. She was refloated and put back to Cardiff, Glamorgan in a leaky condition.
Orkla	United Kingdom	The steamship caught fire at Liverpool, Lancashire. The fire was extinguished.
Ouse	United Kingdom	The steamship ran aground at Cardiff.
Vectis	United Kingdom	The steamship ran aground at Cardiff.

== 20 November ==
List of shipwrecks: 20 November 1889
Ship	State	Description
Decima	United Kingdom	The steamship was driven ashore at "Guedsar". She was later refloated and taken in to Kiel, Germany, where she arrived on 22 November.
Edith Godden	United Kingdom	The steamship foundered at sea. Her crew were rescued.
Manhattan	United States	The cargo liner was sunk in a collision with the schooner Agnes Manning (United States) off Fenwick Island, Delaware, eight miles (13 km) off the Fenwick Shoal Lightship with the loss of eleven lives.<refARSIGSIS90/>
Marie	United Kingdom	The schooner foundered at the mouth of the Saint Lawrence River with the loss of all eight people on board.
Minna	United Kingdom	The steamship was driven ashore on the Ness of Queys, in the Pentland Firth. She was on a voyage from Liverpool, Lancashire to Copenhagen, Denmark. She broke up on 23 November.

== 21 November ==
List of shipwrecks: 21 November 1889
Ship	State	Description
Beechdale	United States	The ship was driven ashore on Fire Island, New York. Her crew were rescued. She was on a voyage from Havana, Cuba to New York City. She was refloated in early December and taken in to New York in a leaky condition.
Olga	Denmark	The brig was wrecked at the mouth of the River Ythan with the loss of one of her eight crew. She was on a voyage from Söderhamn, Sweden to Sunderland, County Durham, United Kingdom.

== 22 November ==
List of shipwrecks: 22 November 1889
Ship	State	Description
Bessie Whineray	United Kingdom	The brigantine collided with the steamship Washington (United Kingdom) and sank in the River Thames at Gravesend, Kent. Her crew were rescued by Washington.
China	United Kingdom	The steamship ran aground at Yokohama, Japan. She was refloated on 24 November.
Corso	United Kingdom	The steamship caught fire at Liverpool, Lancashire. The fire was extinguished.
Industria	United Kingdom	The steam trawler collided with the quayside and sank at Milford Haven, Pembrokeshire.
Sugar	United Kingdom	The steamship was driven ashore on Inishgort, County Mayo. She was on a voyage from Liverpool to Newport, County Mayo. She was refloated but had to be beached.

== 23 November ==
List of shipwrecks: 23 November 1889
Ship	State	Description
Berbice	United Kingdom	The steamship collided with the breakwater at Las Palmas, Canary Islands and was beached.
Lycia	United Kingdom	The steamship ran aground in the Suez Canal. She was refloated the next day.

== 24 November ==
List of shipwrecks: 24 November 1889
Ship	State	Description
Agnes	United Kingdom	The Thames barge was driven ashore at Southend, Essex.
George Jehu	United Kingdom	The Thames barge was driven ashore at Southend.
Helen	United Kingdom	The brigantine foundered off Roundstone, County Galway. Her crew were rescued.
Jane Fleming	United Kingdom	The Thames barge sank at Southend.
Silberhorn	Flag unknown	The ship was severely damaged by fire at Hull, Yorkshire, United Kingdom.

== 25 November ==
List of shipwrecks: 25 November 1889
Ship	State	Description
Twilight	United Kingdom	The barque was driven ashore in Trawbreaga Bay.

== 26 November ==
List of shipwrecks: 26 November 1889
Ship	State	Description
Madame Angot	Belgium	The fishing trawler collided with a British smack and sank in the English Channel. Her six crew were rescued by the smack Express (United Kingdom).
Selinunte	Italy	The steamship was driven ashore near Brindisi.
Sylph	United Kingdom	The schooner was abandoned off Scrabster, Caithness. Her crew were rescued by the Scrabster Lifeboat Charley Lloyd ( Royal National Lifeboat Institution).
William Jones	United Kingdom	The schooner was abandoned off Scrabster. Her crew were rescued by the Scrabster Lifeboat Charley Lloyd ( Royal National Lifeboat Institution).

== 27 November ==
List of shipwrecks: 27 November 1889
Ship	State	Description
Germania	Flag unknown	The barque was driven ashore at Long Branch, New Jersey, United States with the loss of at least six lives.
Replenish	United Kingdom	The fishing lugger was run into by a smack and was abandoned in the North Sea 35 nautical miles (65 km) off Lowestoft, Suffolk. Her crew were rescued by the smack James and Martha (United Kingdom).

== 28 November ==
List of shipwrecks: 28 November 1889
Ship	State	Description
Arbutus	United Kingdom	The steamship was driven ashore at Roker, County Durham. She was refloated on 4 December with the assistance of five tugs.
Cremon	Germany	The steamship ran aground in the River Thames at Northfleet, Kent, United Kingdom. She was on a voyage from London, United Kingdom to Halifax, Nova Scotia, Canada. She was refloated and towed in to Gravesend, Kent by the tug Contest (United Kingdom).
Volunteer	United Kingdom	The fishing boat foundered in Rye Bay with the loss of four lives.
Nominoé	France	The brig ran aground near Blankenberge, West Flanders, Belgium during a violent storm. All five crew were rescued by Belgian lifeguards, but five lifeguards died during the rescue attempts.
Scottish Prince	United Kingdom	The steamship collided with the quayside at Woolwich, London and was beached. She was refloated and towed upstream.
Ville de Marseille	France	The vessel blew up, in the national dock at Marseille, when 3000 barrels of gunpowder exploded.

== 29 November ==
List of shipwrecks: 29 November 1889
Ship	State	Description
British Monarch	United Kingdom	The barque exploded 500 nautical miles (930 km) south west of the Cape of Good Hope, Cape Colony. She was on a voyage from Hamburg, Germany to Sydney, New South Wales. Her twenty crew tood to three boats. Fourteen crew in two boats were rescued on 2 November by the whaler barque Canton (United States).
Idaho	United States	Idaho The steamship ran aground on the Rosedale Reef, in the Strait of Juan de Fuca. She was on a voyage from Port Townsend, Washington to Portland, Oregon. She floated off in December and was taken in to Port Townsend, where she sank.
Three Brothers	United States	The schooner sank off Norman's Woe, Massachusetts. Two crewmen died, her captain was saved by the schooner Apollo (United States)

== 30 November ==
List of shipwrecks: 30 November 1889
Ship	State	Description
Dart	(United Kingdom of Great Britain and Ireland) Jersey	The schooner foundered in the Irish Sea 10 nautical miles (19 km) south west of the South Stack Lighthouse, Anglesey. She was on a voyage from Runcorn, Cheshire to "Briduc", France.
Iowa, Ligurian, and Munin	United Kingdom; United Kingdom; Sweden	The steamship Ligurian was run into by the steamship Iowa near Liverpool, Lancashire and was beached at New Brighton, Cheshire. Ligurian was on a voyage from Alexandria, Egypt to Liverpool. Iowa then ran into the steamship Munin, severely damaging that vessel and was herself beached at Waterloo, Lancashire. Iowa was on a voyage from Liverpool to Boston, Massachusetts, United States. She was refloated the next day and taken in to Liverpool. Munin was on a voyage from Liverpool to Gothenburg. She put back to Liverpool.
Osprey	United Kingdom	The steamship collided with the steamship Petrel in the River Thames at Charlton, London and was beached. She was refloated and taken in to a drydock.
Riley	United Kingdom	The ship was driven ashore and wrecked on Mutton Island, County Clare. She was on a voyage from North Shields, Northumberland to Galway.

== Unknown date ==
List of shipwrecks: Unknown date in November 1889
Ship	State	Description
Adventure	France	The schooner collided with the steamship Teutonia (Germany) and sank. Her crew were rescued by Teutonia.
Alfred	Bermuda	The brigantine was abandoned at sea. Her crew were rescued.
Amoy	United Kingdom	The full-rigged ship was wrecked at "Point William", Falkland Islands. Her crew were rescued. She was on a voyage from Paranaguá, Brazil to Valparaíso, Chile.
Anglo-Dane	United Kingdom	The steamship ran aground at "Svalerumpn". She was on a voyage from Libava, Courland Governorate to Antwerp, Belgium.
Anna Smith	United States	The steamship was driven ashore at Cheboygan, Michigan. She was a total loss.
Arethusa	United Kingdom	The barque caught fire off the Falkland Islands and was abandoned with the loss of three of her crew.
Belle of the Bay	United States	The brigantine was abandoned in the Atlantic Ocean before 8 November.
Betty	Sweden	The schooner was driven ashore on Anholt, Denmark.
Bilbao	Flag unknown	The steamship ran aground on the Whitgift Ness Sand, in the Thames Estuary. She was refloated on 27 November and taken in to London.
Bjärke	Sweden	The brig was driven ashore on Anholt.
Brenda	United Kingdom	The ship was driven ashore near the mouth of the Courentyne River. She was later refloated and taken in to Demerara, British Guiana.
Cheeseborough	United States	The barque was wrecked at "Aviomori", Japan with the loss of nineteen of her 23 crew. She was on a voyage from Hakodadi, Japan to New York.
Christine Elizabeth	Norway	The schooner ran aground on the Longsand, in the North Sea off the coast of Essex, United Kingdom. She was on a voyage from Rotterdam, South Holland, Netherlands to the East Indies. She was refloated with assistance from the lifeboat Duke of Northumberland ( Royal National Lifeboat Institution) and the tug Harwich (United Kingdom) and towed in to Harwich, Essex.
Comte de Hainault	Belgium	The ship sank in the Basses de Lescouil, off the coast of Finistère, France. Her crew were recued. She was on a voyage from Bilbao, Spain to Antwerp.
Constance Ellen	United Kingdom	The schooner ran aground on the Nore. She was refloated on 3 November and resumed her voyage.
D. C. Whitney	United States	The schooner was driven ashore at Mackinac Island, Michigan.
Duburg	Germany	The steamship was driven ashore and wrecked between Saigon, French Indo-China and Hong Kong before 18 November in a typhoon. All on board, more than 400 people, were lost.
Durham	United Kingdom	The steamship was driven ashore at "Rasabubaka", Egypt. She was refloated and taken in to Suez, Egypt.
Enterprise	United Kingdom	The ship was wrecked at "Assinee". She was on a voyage from Liverpool, Lancashire to Grand-Bassam, Ivory Coast.
Eriminta	United Kingdom	The ship was driven ashore near Glenluce, Wigtownshire.
Excelsior	United States	The steamship collided with the steamship Maritana (United Kingdom) and was severely damaged.
Fairway	United Kingdom	The steamship ran aground in the Humber at Brough, Yorkshire. She was on a voyage from Goole, Yorkshire to London.
Falka	Norway	The barque ran aground on the "Lemanover". She was on a voyage from Stockholm, Sweden to Avonmouth, Somerset, United Kingdom. She was refloated and put in to Kristiansand in a leaky condition.
Fanny Scott	United Kingdom	The brig ran aground at San Pedro, Argentina.
Flying Venus	Flag unknown	The ship was wrecked on Penrhyn Island. Her crew were rescued. She was on a voyage from San Francisco, California, United States to Melbourne, Victoria.
Grace Darling	United Kingdom	The ship was driven ashore at Falsterbo, Sweden.
Helen	United Kingdom	The ship struck the Bellows Rock and was wrecked. She was on a voyage from Milltown Malbay, County Clare to Bowling, Dunbartonshire.
Hattie E. Tapley	United Kingdom	The barque was driven ashore and wrecked at Hong Kong. She was on a voyage from Sandakan, Malaya to Hong Kong.
Isle of Jura	United Kingdom	The steamship was driven ashore on the Russian coast. She was refloated and towed in to Riga, Russia in a leaky condition.
Heinrich	Germany	The schooner was driven ashore and wrecked on the Swedish coast. She was on a voyage from Landskrona, Sweden to Fredrikstadt, Denmark.
Iron Queen	United Kingdom	The schooner was driven ashore at Mackinac Island.
Jacobus Johannes	Flag unknown	The ship was driven ashore on Anholt.
James Watt	United Kingdom	The steamship put in to Port Said, Egypt on fire.
John Adamson	United Kingdom	The ship was driven ashore between "Psathivia Island" and "Mina Island" and was wrecked.
Loch Garry	United Kingdom	The steamship ran aground at "Dracko", Denmark. She was on a voyage from Riga to London. She was refloated with the assistance of a steamship and taken in to Copenhagen, Denmark.
Lucille	United Kingdom	The brig collided with the steamship Thurston (United Kingdom) in the Atlantic Ocean (48°34′N 6°36′W) and capsized. Her crew were rescued by Thurston.
Manhattan	United States	The steamship collided with a schooner and sank with the loss of 21 of the 35 people on board. She was on a voyage from New York to Richmond, Virginia.
Marie	United Kingdom	The steamship was driven ashore. She was refloated on 15 November and resumed her voyage.
Merannic	United Kingdom	The steamship was driven ashore at "Tornbk". She was on a voyage from Cardiff, Glamorgan to Copenhagen. She was refloated on 18 November.
Moss Brow	United Kingdom	The steamship was damaged by fire at Galveston, Texas, United States.
M. W. Sage	United States	The schooner was driven ashore at Cheboygan.
Nerissa	Germany	The steamship was driven ashore on Texel, North Holland, Netherlands. She was on a voyage from London to Hamburg.
Nobreza	Flag unknown	The derelict ship was towed in to Bermuda.
Nova Scotian	United Kingdom	The ship was driven ashore at Baltimore, Maryland, United States. She was later refloated.
Nyl Ghau	United Kingdom	The barque was wrecked on the Pratas Shoal.
Ordovic	United Kingdom	The barque was driven ashore at Cape Henry, Virginia, United States. She was on a voyage from a port in Chile to the Hampton Roads, Virginia. She was refloated.
Polly	South Australia	The steamship was wrecked in the Johnstone River.
Redwing	United States	The schooner was driven ashore at Cheboygan.
Resolute	United Kingdom	The steamship was driven ashore. She was refloated on 18 November and taken in to the Mumbles, Glamorgan.
Restless	United States	The tug was wrecked off the Oregon coast with the loss of ten lives.
Rheola	Russia	The steamship ran aground off Stubben, Denmark. She was on a voyage from Yevpatoria to Saint Petersburg. She was refloated with the assistance of a steamship and resumed her voyage.
Rhineland	Germany	The steamship was driven ashore on Bornholm, Denmark. She was on a voyage from Riga to Dordrecht, South Holland, Netherlands. She was refloated and taken in to Helsingør, Denmark for repairs.
Rio Uruguay, and Teseo	Argentina; United Kingdom	The steamships collided at Buenos Aires. Both vessels were severely damaged.
Robina	United Kingdom	The steamship was driven ashore in Sarisiglar Bay. She was on a voyage from Venice, Italy to Galaţi, Romania. She was refloated and resumed her voyage.
Rose of Torridge	United Kingdom	The schooner ran aground in the Omøsund. She was on a voyage from Portmadoc, Caernarfonshire to Karrebæksminde, Denmark. She was refloated with assistance and taken in to Karrebæksminde.
Sensation	United Kingdom	The schooner ran aground on the Shipwash Sand, in the North Sea off the coast of Suffolk. She was refloated with assistance from the smack Alpha and the yawl Jane (both United Kingdom).
Shakespear	United Kingdom	The steamship was driven ashore at Philadelphia, Pennsylvania, United States. She was refloated with assistance.
Strathesk	United Kingdom	The ship was driven ashore at the entrance to the Carlingford Lough. Her crew survived. She was on a voyage from Glasgow, Renfrewshire to Newry, County Antrim.
Thorvecke II	Netherlands	The barque was driven ashore at Angier, Netherlands East Indies. She was a total loss.
Wieland	Flag unknown	The ship was driven ashore in the Wash Channel. She was refloated.
William Davie	United Kingdom	The barque was destroyed by fire at sea. Her crew were rescued by Glencolyn (United Kingdom). William Davie was on a voyage from Fleetwood, Lancashire to Valparaíso.
Willie and Ida	United States	The ship was driven ashore and wrecked at Cuttyhunk, Massachusetts. She was on a voyage from Port-au-Prince, Haiti to Boston, Massachusetts.
Yoxford	United Kingdom	The steamship was driven ashore and wrecked at Maasvlakte, South Holland. Her crew were rescued. She was refloated in early December with assistance.
Several unnamed vessels	Flags unknown	The ships were driven ashore and wrecked between Saigon and Hong Kong before 18 November in a typhoon.
