= Ada and Ethel =

Schooner

Coordinates: 32.6°S 152.7°E

History

New South Wales
- Name: Ada and Ethel
- Owner: Edward Davies, Charles Frederick Messell
- Port of registry: Sydney
- Identification: registration number: 34/1886; official number: 93496
- Builder: Edward Davies /Mr. Roderick at Williams River (New South Wales), New South Wales, Australia
- Launched: 9 January 1886
- Sponsored by: Miss Ada Messell
- Christened: 9 January 1886
- Completed: May 1886
- Maiden voyage: 16 April 1886 for Macleay River
- Fate: Wrecked 26 October 1887

General characteristics
- Type: Wood Schooner
- Tonnage: 73 GRT, 73 NRT
- Length: 25.05 m
- Beam: 5.974 m
- Draught: 1.950 m
- Propulsion: sail

Ada and Ethel was a wooden schooner that was wrecked 10 miles (16 km) southeast of Seal Rocks, New South Wales, Australia, on 26 October 1887.

== Ship description and construction ==
On 9 January 1886, Mr. Roderick of Eagleton, New South Wales, launched a new vessel built to the order of Messrs. Captain C. T. Messell and E. Davies, of Sydney, New South Wales. The christening ceremony was performed with champagne by Miss Ada Messell, Captain Messell's daughter. The vessel was named after Ada and her infant sister Ethel May, who died approximately 12 months later.

Ada and Ethel then was taken to Sydney, entering Sydney Heads at half-past eleven on the night of 19 February 1886 under tow by the steamer Malua and was brought up in Pyrmont Bight to have her mast and other fittings installed. The passage down from Williams River was made in 10 hours.

Ada and Ethel was rigged as a fore-and-aft schooner, intended for the coasting trade. Her dimensions were 82.2 feet (25.05 m) long, 19.6 feet (5.97 m) beam, and 6.4 feet (1.95 m) depth, which gave her a gross register tonnage of 73 tons. She was built substantially of the best colonial hardwood, coppered, and copper-fastened. She was a sister ship of Julian, which was launched about eight months earlier and belonged to the same firm.

== Wreck ==
Ada and Ethel left port on the afternoon of 26 October 1887 under the command of Captain Frederick. They soon found that the ship was taking on water so rapidly that by 19:30 the vessel became unmanageable, and Captain Frederick endeavoured to make for Port Stephens, New South Wales, where he intended to beach her. However, it was soon apparent that Ada and Ethel would not reach the shore, and Captain Frederick and the five members of his crew abandoned ship off Seal Rocks, New South Wales.
