= SS Said =

Egyptian cargo ship that got sunk by German submarine

History
- Name: (Egypt) Limande; (Egypt) Vincenzo G.; (Egypt) Said
- Owner: Abdel Kader Eff. El Tartoussieh
- Port of registry: Egypt, Alexandria
- Builder: Cammell Laird & Co.
- Completed: 1886
- Acquired: 1886
- Maiden voyage: 1886
- In service: 1886
- Fate: Shelled and sunk 8 June 1942

General characteristics
- Type: Cargo ship
- Tonnage: 231 GRT
- Crew: 14

SS Said was an Egyptian cargo ship that the German submarine U-83 shelled and sunk on 8 June 1942 in the Mediterranean Sea 15 nautical miles (28 km) southwest of Jaffa, Palestine. Said was carrying 50 to 60 tons worth of general cargo including tobacco from Mersin, Turkey to Alexandria, Egypt.

== Construction ==
Said was built at the Cammell Laird & Co. shipyard in Birkenhead, United Kingdom in 1886. Where she was launched and completed that same year. She was assessed at 231 GRT.

== Sinking ==
While Said was on her usual route from Mersin to Alexandria with 50 to 60 tons of general cargo including tobacco, she was spotted by the German submarine U-83 at 05.11 am on 8 June 1942. U-83 fired two torpedoes at her but both missed. After the failed attack, U-83 surfaced and barraged Said with 50 rounds from the submarines deck gun. Said sank 15 nautical miles (28 km) southwest of Jaffa, Palestine with the loss of five of her 14 crew.

== Wreck ==
The wreck of Said lies at a depth of 58 metres (190 ft 3 in) at (32°09′N 34°26′E).
