= USS Sappho (SP-1427) =

United States Navy vessel

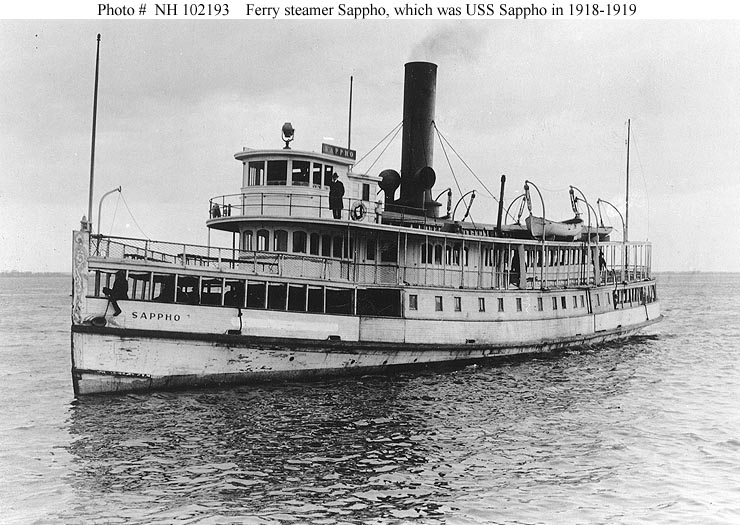
- SS Sappho prior to her United States Navy service.

History

United States
- Name: USS Sappho
- Namesake: Sappho, a 5th-century BC Greek poet (previous name retained)
- Builder: New England Shipbuilding Company, Bath, Maine
- Completed: 1886
- Acquired: 6 August 1918
- Commissioned: 20 August 1918
- Decommissioned: 18 February 1919
- Fate: Returned to owner 18 February 1919
- Notes: In commercial service as ferry steamer SS Sappho 1886-1918 and from 1919

General characteristics
- Type: Ferry transport
- Tonnage: 275 Gross register tons
- Length: 149 ft 9.5 in (45.657 m)
- Beam: 28 ft 9.5 in (8.776 m)
- Draft: 10 ft (3.0 m)
- Propulsion: Steam engine
- Speed: 15 knots (maximum)

The first USS Sappho (ID-1427) was a United States Navy ferry transport in commission from 1918 to 1919.

Sappho was built in 1886 as a wooden-hulled commercial ferry steamer SS Sappho at Bath, Maine, by New England Shipbuilding Company. The U.S. Navy acquired her from her owner, William C. Sproul of Chester, Pennsylvania, for World War I service on 6 August 1918 and commissioned her on 20 August 1918 as USS Sappho.

Sappho was assigned to the 4th Naval District for local transport duty, providing transportation between the Philadelphia Navy Yard in Philadelphia, Pennsylvania, and nearby ports in New York and New Jersey.

Five days after Sappho was commissioned, SS Delaware accidentally rammed her on 25 August 1918. Repairs were complete by 20 October 1918, allowing Sappho to resume transport service.

Sappho was decommissioned at Philadelphia on 18 February 1919, and returned to her owner the same day. Her Navy crew was returned to the Philadelphia Navy Yard by the tug USS Triton (YT-10).
