= SS Ossifrage =

History
- Name: Ossifrage
- Owner: Ball William, Chatham
- Port of registry: Halifax, Nova Scotia, Canada
- Builder: F.W. Wheeler & Co.
- Yard number: 26
- Launched: 11 May 1886
- Identification: 107488
- Fate: Struck a shoal and foundered 29 September 1919

General characteristics
- Type: barge, lighter
- Tonnage: 383 GRT
- Length: 46.6 metres (152 ft 11 in)
- Beam: 8.8 metres (28 ft 10 in)
- Depth: 2 metres (6 ft 7 in)
- Installed power: Triple expansion steam engine
- Propulsion: Screw propeller

SS Ossifrage was a Canadian barge that hit a shoal in the Northumberland Strait in 1919, while she was being towed from Wallace, Nova Scotia, Canada to Souris, Prince Edward Island, Canada.

== Construction ==
Ossifrage was a passenger ship constructed out of wood at the F.W. Wheeler & Co. shipyard in West Bay City, Michigan. She was launched on 11 May 1886.

The ship was 46.6 metres (152 ft 11 in) long, with a beam of 8.8 metres (28 ft 10 in) and a depth of 2 metres (6 ft 7 in). The ship was assessed at 383 GRT. She had a Triple expansion steam engine driving a single screw propeller and one Scotch boiler. The engine was rated at 540 nhp.

== New owner ==
She was sold in 1916 to Canadian owners and registered at Halifax, Nova Scotia with registration no. 107488. Where she was later stripped down and her Hulk used as a barge for the fishing industry.

== Sinking ==
On 29 September 1919, Ossifrage was being towed from Wallace, Nova Scotia, Canada to Souris, Prince Edward Island, Canada when she hit a Shoal in the Northumberland Strait. The ship foundered with no casualties.
