= Abbotsinch =

Area of Paisley, Scotland, UK, occupied by Glasgow Airport

Coordinates: 55.8625°N 4.4441°W

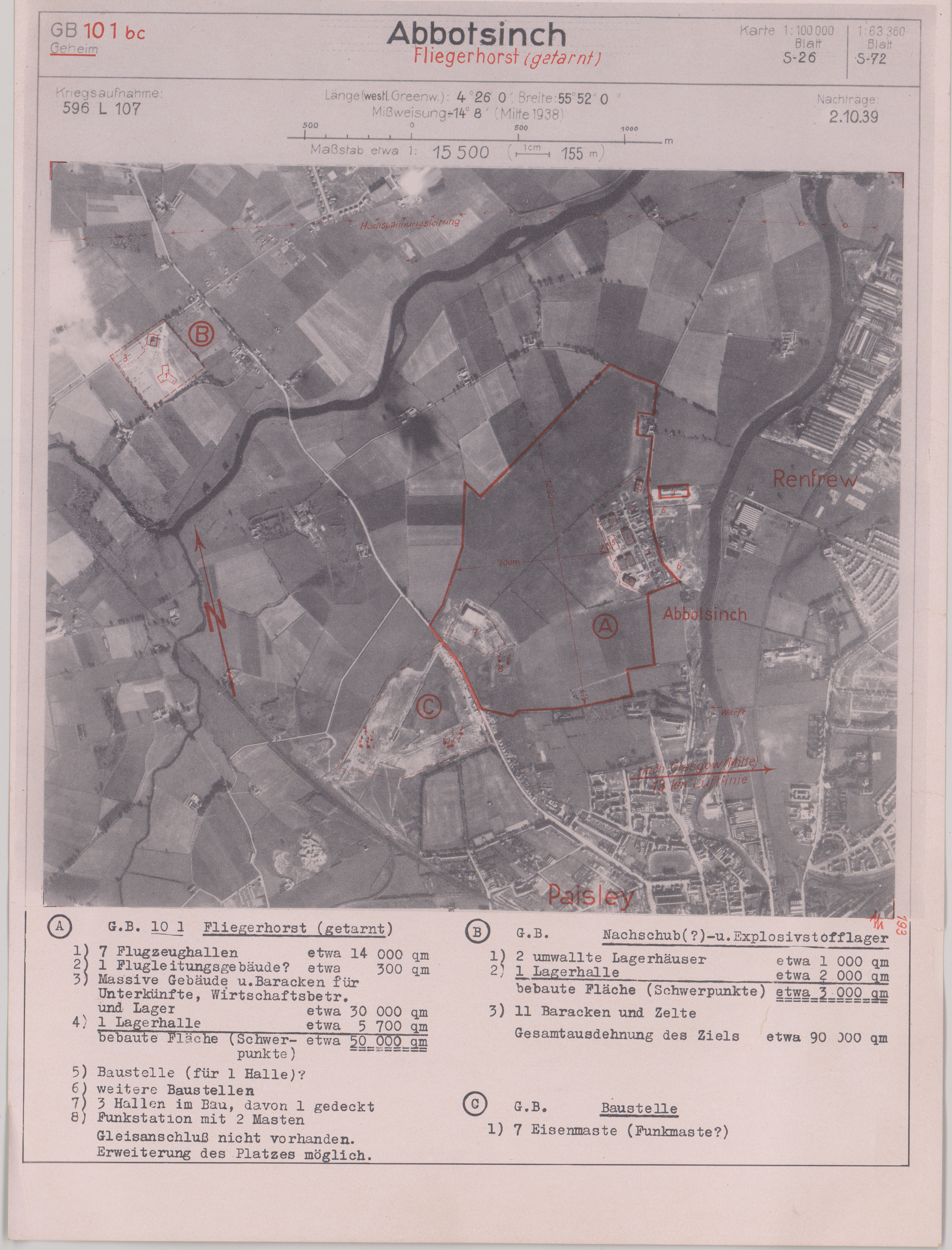
Target dossier of the German Air Force, 1939

Abbotsinch is an area in the town of Paisley, Scotland. It is today almost entirely occupied by Glasgow Airport.

Traditionally in the parish of Renfrew (although not within its burgh boundary), Abbotsinch is bordered by the Black Cart Water to the north and west, and the White Cart Water to the east. Its southern edge was delineated by the burgh boundary of Paisley, although after the 1975 local government reorganisation in Scotland these demarcations became unofficial.

Abbotsinch largely consisted of farmland before the construction of a Royal Air Force airfield there in 1932. The Georgian mansion Walkinshaw House, one of Robert Adam's most significant works was demolished in 1927 to enable the runway to be constructed. Today all that remains of the estate are parts of the walled garden which lie to the west of Glasgow Airport's runway.

One of the busiest stretches of the M8 motorway outside Glasgow and Edinburgh is to be found at the St. James Interchange, a junction of the motorway with the A726 and A737 roads. The White Cart Viaduct carries the motorway above the airport access routes: its height was intended for large vessels to pass under, however this has never been needed.
