= USS Albay =

Gunboat of the United States Navy

History

United States
- Name: Albay
- Builder: Manila Ship, Cavite, Philippines
- Launched: 1886
- Acquired: 1898
- Commissioned: 21 May 1899
- Decommissioned: 13 February 1904
- Stricken: 11 February 1905
- Fate: Sold 8 June 1906 to Messrs. Grant and Co., of Manila.

General characteristics
- Type: Gunboat
- Displacement: 173 long tons (176 t)
- Length: 100 ft (30 m)
- Beam: 17 ft 6 in (5.33 m)
- Draft: 6 ft 9 in (2.06 m)
- Installed power: 300 ihp (220 kW)
- Propulsion: 2 × vertical compound steam engines; 2 × screws
- Speed: 8 kn (9.2 mph; 15 km/h)
- Complement: 27
- Armament: 1 × 6-pounder (57 mm (2.24 in)) gun; 2 × 1-pounder (37 mm (1.46 in)) guns; 2 × machine guns

Albay—a small gunboat built at Cavite, Luzon, Philippine Islands, for the Spanish colonial government of the Philippines—was laid down in 1885 and completed in 1886. However, some sources hold that this vessel was constructed at Shanghai by the Hong Kong and Whampoa Dock Co. In any case, she operated in the Philippine Archipelago until captured by American forces there during the Spanish–American War.

Purchased by the United States Department of War soon after the end of hostilities, Albay was transferred to the Navy early in 1899 and, escorted by American gunboats USS Concord and Petrel, arrived in Manila Bay in a convoy of other former Spanish gunboats on 20 April 1899. On 21 May 1899, Ens. Michael J. McCormack was detached from the protected cruiser USS Baltimore and assumed command of Albay when she was placed in commission later that day. During the next few years, the small gunboat was intermittently in and out of commission as she performed patrol duty and helped to survey rivers and bays in the islands. She also served at Cavite as a ferry. On 1 June 1899, Ens. William Harrison Standley—who would later rise to the then nonexistent position of Chief of Naval Operations and subsequently would serve as the American ambassador to the Soviet Union during World War II—relieved McCormack in command of the gunboat.

Placed out of commission at Cavite on 13 February 1904, Albay was still laid up there when her name was struck from the Navy list on 11 February 1905. She was sold on 8 June 1906 to Messrs. Grant and Co., of Manila
