= SV Nominoé (1886) =

History
- Name: Nominoé
- Namesake: Nominoe
- Port of registry: Nantes, France
- Builder: Ateliers & Chantiers Dubigeon
- Yard number: 53
- Completed: 1886
- Maiden voyage: 1886
- In service: 1886
- Out of service: 28 November 1889
- Fate: Ran aground and scrapped
- Notes: Captain Leperion

General characteristics
- Type: Brig
- Tonnage: 210 GRT
- Installed power: 2 Masts
- Propulsion: Sailing Ship
- Crew: 5
- Notes: Captain Leperion

SV Nominoé was a French sailing ship that ran aground near Blankenberge, Belgium during a violent storm while she was travelling from London, United Kingdom to Swansea, Wales, United Kingdom with a cargo of asphalt.

== Construction ==
Nominoé was constructed in 1886 at the Ateliers & Chantiers Dubigeon shipyard in Nantes, France. She was assessed at 210 GRT and had 2 masts.

== Sinking ==
On 28 November 1889, Nominoé was on a voyage from London, United Kingdom to Swansea, Wales, United Kingdom with a cargo of asphalt. When she was suddenly caught in a violent storm on the North Sea. During the storm, her sails failed one by one which made the ship uncontrollable and drove her of course. To make matters worse, she even lost her anchor before the ship was finally blown upon the coast near the casino of the Belgian city of Blankenberge. Out of fear the ship might break apart by the crashing waves, captain Leperion decided to use torches as a signal of distress towards the lifeguards stationed along the coast. The distress signal was spotted at 1400 hours by a lighthouse lookout, who quickly alerted the lifeguards on duty that day.

By 1430 hours, amongst a growing crowd of civilians on the Seawall, a rescue attempt for the five stricken crewmembers on Nominoé was made with a lifeboat occupied by 13 lifeguards wearing lifebelts. Because the Nominoé was stranded so close to shore, certain safety precautions were ignored such as securing the lifeboat with a rope to the shore as a lifeline. The lifeboat, despite having a difficult time plowing through the cold waves, managed to approach Nominoé close enough to try and take on the first crewmember from the ships deck. All five crewmen of Nominoé had by this point stationed themselves in one of the corners of the ship to shelter themselves from the cold waves which were washing across the deck.

Before one the crewmembers could board the lifeboat, it was caught sideways in the rough sea and capsized, remaining afloat upside down. All 13 men were thrown in the waves, but luckily because they were wearing lifebelts, seven of them were able to cling on to the upturned boat and two others managed to swim back to land. Some onlookers who had witnessed the accident from the seawall, tried to swim towards the lifeguards who were stuck on the upturned lifeboat and the others who were still caught in the waves. Most of them however quickly turned back due to the cold and dangerous waves. Ultimately 12 of the 13 lifeguards got back to shore either out of their own strength or thanks to the aid of the brave onlookers. The final lifeguard was still missing after having probably lost his lifebelt when he fell into the sea. Two more had already drowned before they were brought back to shore with another lifeguard died five hours after his rescue.

Due to the accident, the rescue of the crew of Nominoé had to be postponed. By the evening the upturned lifeboat had been blown back onto the shore and was used in a second rescue attempt. At the break of dawn, the new rescue attempt was launched with some of the surviving lifeguards from the previous accident. This time the cold and fatigued crew of Nominoé managed to be saved.

== Aftermath ==
Four lifeguards died in the disaster with a fifth victim dying five weeks later from sustained injuries. All five victims were seen as heroes and therefore buried next to each other on 2 December 1889 at 10 am on the honour park section of the cemetery of Blankenberge named De Plicht (The Duty) with one grave vacant as the person is still missing. The disaster is still commemorated in Blankenberge to this day, even having a restaurant named after the ship located on the seawall near the place where she ran aground in 1889. The Belgian painter Jules Gadeyne even made a painting showing the wrecked ship along with the difficult rescue attempts.

== Wreck ==
The wreck was declared a total loss and scrapped on site. Pieces of the ship were sold as firewood to the local residents.
