= List of ship launches in 1888 =

The list of ship launches in 1888 includes a chronological list of some ships launched in 1888.

Date	Ship	Class / type	Builder	Location	Country	Notes
2 January	Anshin Maru	Steamship	Pearce Bros.	Dundee	United Kingdom	For J. J. Pearson.
2 January	City of Dublin	Steamship	Workman, Clarke & Co.	Belfast	United Kingdom	For George Smith & Son.
2 January	Scottish Prince	Steamship	Short Bros.	Pallion	United Kingdom	For James Knott.
3 January	Undine	Sternwheeler	J. H. Steffen	Portland, Oregon	United States	For Jacob Kamm.
4 January	Lady Ailsa	Steamship	Ailsa Shipbuilding Company	Troon	United Kingdom	For Messrs. J. & A. Wyllie.
7 January	Retriever	Tug	Messrs. W. B. Thompson & Co	Dundee	United Kingdom	For Retriever Steamship Co.
11 January	Lizzie	Steamship	John Readhead & Sons	South Shields	United Kingdom	For Lewis & Co.
12 January	Alberta	Steamship	R. & W. Hawthorn, Leslie & Co.	Hebburn-on-Tyne	United Kingdom	For private owner.
12 January	Clandeboye	Steamship	Messrs. Richardson, Duck & Co.	Stockton-on-Tees	United Kingdom	For Messrs. Carlisle & Co.
12 January	Gabalva	Steamship	Wood, Skinner & Co.	Bill Quay-on-Tyne	United Kingdom	For J. H. Wilson.
12 January	Not named	Steamship	Joseph Eltringham & Co.	South Shields	United Kingdom	For Wexford Harbour Commissioners.
13 January	Godmunding	Steamship	Blyth Shipbuilding Co. Ltd	Blyth	United Kingdom	For T. B. Williams, or W. Lamplough.
14 January	Endeavour	Steamship	Messrs. Robert Stephenson & Co.	Hebburn	United Kingdom	For Messrs. M'Intyre, Bros. & Co.
14 January	Forbin	Forbin-class cruiser	Arsenal de Rochefort	Rochefort	France	For French Navy.
14 January	Kittle	Steamship	W. Gray & Co.	West Hartlepool	United Kingdom	For J. Coverdale.
14 January	Not named	Merchantman	T. Royden & Sons	Liverpool	United Kingdom	For private owner.
17 January	Sutlej	Merchantman	Messrs. Russell & Co.	Port Glasgow	United Kingdom	For Messrs. Foley, Aikman & Co.
17 January	Zizania	Lighthouse tender	H. A. Ramsey & Son	Baltimore, Maryland	United States	For United States Lighthouse Service.
18 January	Ocean	Tanker	Messrs. Russell & Co.	Greenock	United Kingdom	For Messrs. Hermann, Stursberg & Co.
19 January	Amber	Cable ship	Messrs. Robert Napier & Sons	Govan	United Kingdom	For Eastern Telegraph Company.
28 January	C. A. Bade	Steamship	Sunderland Shipbuilding Co. Ltd.	Sunderland	United Kingdom	For Dampfschiffahrts Gesellschaft Neptun.
28 January	Diligent	Steamship	Short Bros.	Sunderland	United Kingdom	For James Westoll.
28 January	Flying Cormorant	Tug	Messrs. Robert Duncan and Co.	Port Glasgow	United Kingdom	For Clyde Shipping Company.
28 January	Lippe	Steamship	Messrs. Alexander Hall & Co.	Aberdeen	United Kingdom	For Adolf Deppe.
28 January	Macgregor	Steamship	Messrs. Workman, Clark, & Co.	Belfast	United Kingdom	For Messrs. Colvils, Lowden & Co.
28 January	Port Caroline	Steamship	R. & W. Hawthorn, Leslie & Co.	Hebburn-on-Tyne	United Kingdom	For W. Milburn & Co.
29 January	Pingyuan	Ironclad	Foochow Arsenal	Mawei	China	For Imperial Chinese Navy.
29 January	Unnamed	Steamship	Messrs. R. & W. Hawthorn, Leslie & Co.	Hebburn	United Kingdom	For Imperial Chinese Government.
30 January	Trelawny	Steamship	John Readhead & Sons	South Shields	United Kingdom	For Messrs. Edward Hain and Son.
31 January	Chia Shih	Steamship	R. & W. Hawthorn, Leslie & Co.	Hebburn-on-Tyne	United Kingdom	For private owner.
31 January	Rufford Hall	Steamship	Messrs. Palmer's	Jarrow	United Kingdom	For Messrs. R. Alexander & Co.
31 January	Taroba	Steamship	Messrs. A. & J. Inglis	Pointhouse	United Kingdom	For British and India Associated Steamers.
31 January	Urania	Steamship	Messrs. W. Gray & Co.	West Hartlepool	United Kingdom	For Messrs. Gladstone & Cornforth.
31 January	Vanguard	Steam yawl	Cook, Welton & Gemmell	Hull	United Kingdom	For Charles Hellyer.
January	Ladyweld	Steamship	Messrs. Scott & Co.	Greenock	United Kingdom	For Nederlandsche Indische Stoomboot Maatschappij.
January	Chaloupe XXXVI	Steam barge	Messrs. Lobnitz & Co.	Renfrew	United Kingdom	For Panama Canal Company.
January	Chaloupe XXXVII	Steam barge	Messrs. Lobnitz & Co.	Renfrew	United Kingdom	For Panama Canal Company.
January	Chaloupe XXXVIII	Steam barge	Messrs. Lobnitz & Co.	Renfrew	United Kingdom	For Panama Canal Company.
January	Netiche	Steam hopper barge	Messrs. Lobnitz & Co.	Renfrew	United Kingdom	For Suez Canal Company.
January	Paragua	Arayat-class gunboat	Manila Ship Company	Cavite	(Spain) Spanish East Indies	For Spanish Navy.
1 February	Strathearn	Steamship	Messrs. Alexander Stephen & Sons	Linthouse	United Kingdom	For Messrs. Alexander Stephen & Sons.
10 February	Merida	Steamship	Messrs. Edward Withy & Co.	Hartlepool	United Kingdom	For Messrs. H. Bucknall & Sons.
11 February	Choy Sang	Steamship	Messrs. Hall, Russell & Co.	Aberdeen	United Kingdom	For Indian and China Steam Navigation Company.
11 February	Holkar	Sailing ship	Harland & Wolff	Belfast	United Kingdom	For T. & J. Brocklebank.
13 February	Miike Maru	Steamship	Robert Thompson & Sons	Southwick	United Kingdom	For Nippon Yusen KK.
13 February	Pallas	Steamship	Raylton Dixon & Co.	Middlesbrough	United Kingdom	For Rathbone Bros. & Co.
14 February	Tropic	Steamship	Whitehaven Shipbuilding Co.	Whitehaven	United Kingdom	For E. C. Thin.
14 February	Ville de Belfort	Steamship	James Laing	Deptford	United Kingdom	For Compagnie Havraise Peninsulaire de Navigation à Vapeur.
27 February	Beethoven	Steamship	Joseph L. Thompsonn & Sons	Monkwearmouth	United Kingdom	For Jennison, Taylor & Co.
28 February	Ben Clune	Steamship	James Laing	Sunderland	United Kingdom	For J. Morrison & Sons.
28 February	Dunboyne	Full-rigged ship	Whitehaven Shipping Company	Whitehaven	(United Kingdom)	For Charles E. Martin & Co.
29 February	Charters Towers	Cargo ship	John Readhead & Sons	South Shields	United Kingdom	For private owner. Collided with the Russian steamship Keetpoma on being launched.
29 February	Evelyn	Steamship	Messrs. W. Gray & Co.	West Hartlepool	United Kingdom	For Messrs. T. Appleby & Co.
29 February	Hailoong	Steamship	Ramage & Ferguson	Leith	United Kingdom	For private owner.
29 February	Knight Companion	Steamship	Messrs. Palmer's	Jarrow	United Kingdom	For Messrs. Greenfields, Cowie & Co.
29 February	Mei Shik	Steamship	Messrs. R. & W. Hawthorn, Leslie & Co.	Newcastle upon Tyne	United Kingdom	For Formosa Trading Corporation.
29 February	Mimosa	Steamship	Messrs. H. S. Edwards & Sons	Howdon-on-Tyne	United Kingdom	For Messrs. Stephens & Sons.
29 February	Pallas	Barque	S. P. Austin & Son	Sunderland	United Kingdom	For Martin G. Amsinck.
29 February	Tulford	Steamship	Raylton Dixon & Co. Ltd.	Middlesbrough	United Kingdom	For J. M. Lennard & Sons.
29 February	Unnamed	Steamship	Messrs. Raylton Dixon & Co.	Middlesbrough	United Kingdom	For Messrs. J. M. Leathard & Co.
29 February	Unnamed	Steamship	Messrs. William Gray & Co.	West Hartlepool	United Kingdom	For Messrs. T. Appleby & Co.
February	Chaseley	Steamship	Messrs. Murdoch & Murray	Port Glasgow	United Kingdom	For Messrs. Murdoch & Murray.
February	Nil	Steam hopper barge	Messrs. Lobnitz & Co.	Renfrew	United Kingdom	For Suez Canal Company.
February	Pampanga	Arayat-class gunboat	Manila Ship Company	Cavite	(Spain) Spanish East Indies	For Spanish Navy.
February	Unnamed	Tug	R. Rodger	Port Glasgow	United Kingdom	For private owner.
1 March	Fulford	Steamship	Messrs. Raylton Dixon & Sons	Middlesbrough	United Kingdom	For Messrs. J. M. Lennard & Sons.
1 March	General Roberts	Steam yawl	Cook, Welton & Gemmell	Hull	United Kingdom	For Pickering and Haldane.
1 March	Olymp	Steamship	C. Connell & Co.	Glasgow	United Kingdom	For H. Wenche Sohne.
1 March	Guadalquivir	Steamship	Forges et Chantiers de la Méditerranée	Le Havre	France	For Cie. des Messageries Maritimes
2 March	Crathorne	Steamship	W. Gray & Co.	West Hartlepool	United Kingdom	For R. Ropner & Co.
3 March	Samson	Tug	Earle's Shipbuilding & Engineering Co.	Hull	United Kingdom	For Earle's Shipbuilding & Engineering Co.
3 March	Titanic	Steamship	M'Ilwaine, Lewis & Co.	Belfast	United Kingdom	For H. J. Scott & Co.
8 March	Virgo	Steam ketch	Earle's Shipbuilding & Engineering Co.	Hull	United Kingdom	For Grimsby and North Sea Steam Trawling Company (Limited).
9 March	Hampton	Steamship	John Blumer & Co.	Sunderland	United Kingdom	For Commercial Steamship Co. Ltd.
10 March	Conscript	Steamship	Messrs. A. M'Millan & Son	Dumbarton	United Kingdom	For Messrs. Harvey & Co.
10 March	Nith	Steamship	Messrs. Edward Withy & Co.	Hartlepool	United Kingdom	For Messrs. Steel, Young & Co.
10 March	Remus	Steam ketch / fishing vessel	Oswald, Mordaunt & Co.	Southampton	United Kingdom	For Francis W. Leybourne Popham.
12 March	Brunner	Steamship	J. M'Arthur	Paisley	United Kingdom	For Martin Kennedy.
13 March	Tynesider	Steamship	Messrs. Schlesinger, Davis & Co.	Wallsend	United Kingdom	For Tyne Steam Shipping Co.
14 March	Algonquin	Steamship	Messrs. Napier, Shanks & Bell	Yoker	United Kingdom	For Messrs. Thomas Marks & Co.
14 March	Bostonian	Cargo ship	Harland & Wolff	Belfast	United Kingdom	For White Star Line.
14 March	Montebello	Goito-class cruiser	Arsenale di La Spezia	La Spezia	Italy	For Regia Marina.
14 March	Monzambano	Goito-class cruiser	Arsenale di La Spezia	La Spezia	Italy	For Regia Marina.
14 March	Princesse Henriette	Paddle steamer	Messrs. William Denny & Bros.	Dumbarton	United Kingdom	For Belgian Government.
14 March	Saikyō Maru	Steamship	London and Glasgow Engineering and Iron Shipbuilding Company	Govan	United Kingdom	For Nippon Yusen KK.
14 March	Seafarer	Barque	Messrs. W. H. Potter & Co.	Liverpool	United Kingdom	For private owner.
15 March	City of New York	Ocean liner	J. & G. Thompson	Clydebank	United Kingdom	For Inman Line.
15 March	Loch Lomond	Steamship	Palmers & Co.	Newcastle upon Tyne	United Kingdom	For Dundee Loch Line Steamship Co. Ltd.
15 March	Princess Louise	Steamship	D. & W. Henderson	Glasgow	United Kingdom	For M. Langlands & Sons.
15 March	Rio Tinto	Steamship	Short Bros.	Sunderland	United Kingdom	For John Tully.
17 March	Birchfield	Steamship	Joseph L. Thompson & Sons	Sunderland	United Kingdom	For Joseph Brown.
17 March	Phyllis	Merchantman	Charles Hill & Sons	Bristol	United Kingdom	For Charles Hill & Sons.
20 March	Melita	Mariner-class gunvessel	Malta Dockyard	Malta	Malta	For Royal Navy.
21 March	Candia	Steamship	W. Dobson & Co	Newcastle upon Tyne	United Kingdom	For private owner.
23 March	Bio Bio	Steamship	R. Napier & Sons	Port Glasgow	United Kingdom	For Compania Sud Americana de Vapores.
23 March	Domira	Steamship	A. Stephen & Sons	Glasow	United Kingdom	For Maclay & M'Intyre.
23 March	Orkla	Steamship	S. P. Austin & Son	Sunderland	United Kingdom	For C. Salvesen & Co.
24 March	Virginia	Steamship	Messrs. Russell & Co.	Port Glasgow	United Kingdom	For Frederick Woods.
26 March	Chanzy	Steamship	Sunderland Shipbuilding Co. Ltd	Sunderland	United Kingdom	For P. Allainguillaume.
26 March	Neptune	Steamship	Messrs. R. & J. Evans & Co.	Liverpool	United Kingdom	For Mersey Docks and Harbour Board.
27 March	Falshaw	Steamship	Messrs. T. Turnbull & Son	Whitby	United Kingdom	For Messrs. H. Baxter & Co.
27 March	Julio	Steamship	William Doxford & Sons	Sunderland	United Kingdom	For Compania Bilbaina de Navegaçion.
27 March	Nile	Trafalgar-class ironclad	Pembroke Dockyard	Pembroke, Pembrokeshire	United Kingdom	For Royal Navy.
27 March	Romulus	Steam ketch / Fishing vessel	Oswald, Mordaunt & Co.	Southampton	United Kingdom	For Francis W. Leybourne Popham.
28 March	Demira	Steamship	Messrs. Alexander Stephens & Sons	Linthouse	United Kingdom	For Messrs. Maclay & M'Intyre.
28 March	Resolution	Steamship	Joseph L. Thompson & Sons	Sunderland	United Kingdom	For Rowland & Marwood.
29 March	Alfonso XII	Steamship	Messrs. Wigham, Richardson & Co. Ltd.	Low Walker	United Kingdom	For Compania Transatlantica.
29 March	Engineer	Steamship	James Laing	Sunderland	United Kingdom	For Tatham, Bromage & Co.
29 March	Moss Rose	Schooner	Barr & Shearer	Ardrossan	United Kingdom	For Coppack, Carter & Co.
29 March	Silver Crag	Full-rigged ship	R. Williamson & Sons	Workington	United Kingdom	For private owner.
31 March	Red Eagle	Steam yacht	Ramage & Ferguson	Leith	United Kingdom	For Sir G. S. Stucley.
31 March	Sapphire	Steamship	Messrs. Richardson, Duck & Co.	Stockton-on-Tees	United Kingdom	For Messrs. Christie & Co.
March	Benefactor	Smack	Messrs. Page & Chambers	Lowestoft	United Kingdom	For G. Long.
March	Earl of Dunraven	Paddle steamer	J. T. Eltringham	South Shields	United Kingdom	For H. B. Marguand.
2 April	Lady Torfrida	Steam yacht	Fairfield Shipbuilding and Engineering Company	Fairfield	United Kingdom	For Sir William Pearce.
3 April	Cupica	Barque	Charles J. Bigger	Londonderry	United Kingdom	For W. H. Ross & Co.
3 April	Guy Colin	Steamship	Raylton Dixon & Co.	Middlesbrough	United Kingdom	For G. E. Bowring.
3 April	No. 11	Sailing barge	W. H. Potter & Sons	Liverpool	United Kingdom	For R. Singlehurst.
3 April	No. 12	Sailing barge	W. H. Potter & Sons	Liverpool	United Kingdom	For R. Singlehurst.
4 April	Rosini	Steamship	W. H. Halford	Gloucester	United Kingdom	For R. G. Foster.
7 April	Gellivara	Steamship	C. S. Swan, Hunter & Co.	Wallsend	United Kingdom	For Anglo-Scandinavian Steamship Co. (Ltd.).
7 April	Priscilla	Sloop	Elisha Saxton	Patchogue River	United States	For George Rhinehart.
10 April	Luath	Steam yacht	W. S. Cumming	Glasgow	United Kingdom	For John Henry.
10 April	Pheasant	Pygmy-class gunboat		Devonport Dockyard	United Kingdom	For Royal Navy.
11 April	Shearwater	Steamship	H. S. Edwards & Sons	Howdon	United Kingdom	For Sharp & Co.
12 April	Adderley	Barque	Messrs. John Reid & Co.	Port Glasgow	United Kingdom	For Messrs. C. W. Kellock & Co.
12 April	Benmore	Steamship	Messrs. William Dobson & Co.	Low Walker-on-Tyne	United Kingdom	For Grampian Steamship Company Limited.
12 April	Camphill	Steamship	Messrs. Russell & Co.	Port Glasgow	United Kingdom	For Messrs. Macbeth & Gray.
12 April	Haperley	Steamship	J. Readhead & Co.	South Shields	United Kingdom	For W. Wright.
12 April	Harrow	Steamship	Messrs. W. Gray & Co.	West Hartlepool	United Kingdom	For Messrs. Galbraith, Pembroke & Co.
12 April	Rouen	Paddle steamer	Fairfield Shipbuilding and Engineering Company	Fairfield	United Kingdom	For London, Brighton and South Coast Railway.
13 April	Lowlands	Steamship	W. Gray & Co.	West Hartlepool	United Kingdom	For Hardy, Wilson & Co.
14 April	Cairnryan	Steamship	Palmers & Co.	Newcastle upon Tyne	United Kingdom	For R. & D. Cairns.
14 April	Fusilier	Paddle steamer	Messrs. J. M'Arthur & Co.	Paisley	United Kingdom	For David MacBrayne.
14 April	Idar	Cargo ship	Harland & Wolff	Belfast	United Kingdom	For F Leyland & Co., or Messrs. Edward Bates & Sons.
14 April	Lorton	Barque	Messrs. Workman, Clark & Co.	Belfast	United Kingdom	For Messrs. P. Iredale & Son.
14 April	Macassa	Steamship	Messrs. William Hamilton & Co.	Port Glasgow	United Kingdom	For Hamilton Steamboat Co.
14 April	Volunteer	Steamship	Messrs. Archibald M'Millan & Son	Dumbarton	United Kingdom	For Government of Newfoundland.
16 April	Edith and Annie	Lifeboat	Naval Construction & Armaments Co.	Barrow-in-Furness	United Kingdom	For Royal National Lifeboat Institution.
16 April	Ruby	Steamship	Messrs. Scott & Co.	Bowling	United Kingdom	For William Robertson.
17 April	Marion Lightbody	Full-rigged ship	Messrs. David & William Henderson & Co.	Meadowside	United Kingdom	For Rogers & Co.
23 April	Grenville	Steamship	Messrs. Edward Withy & Co.	Hartlepool	United Kingdom	For Messrs. J. Holman & Son.
23 April	Hereward	Tug	Cook, Welton & Gemmell	Hull	United Kingdom	For T. Gray & Co (Ltd.).
24 April	Zeta	Steamship	Joseph L. Thompson & Sons	Sunderland	United Kingdom	For Turner, Brightman & Co.
25 April	Florrie	Ketch	Robert Cock	Bideford	United Kingdom	For R. Cock.
25 April	Spindrift	Steamship	Messrs. Russell & Co.	Greenock	United Kingdom	For J. Y. Barwick.
26 April	Ferrando	Steamship	Palmers Co. (Limited)	Jarrow-on-Tyne	United Kingdom	For private owner.
26 April	Madagascar	Full-rigged ship	Messrs. Russell & Co.	Kingston	United Kingdom	For J. Boyd.
26 April	Mary Nish	Schooner	William Geddie	Banff	United Kingdom	For David Shaw.
26 April	Trieste C.	Steamship	Russell & Co.	Greenock	United Kingdom	For M. Cesari.
26 April	Unnamed	Steam yacht	Messrs. Ramage & Ferguson	Leith	United Kingdom	For Mrs. Yorke.
26 April	Unnamed	Hopper Dredger	Messrs. William Simons & Co.	Renfrew	United Kingdom	For private owne.
28 April	Brenner	Steamship	William Doxford & Sons	Sunderland	United Kingdom	For Cay, Hall & Co. Ltd.
28 April	Britannia	Steamship	Grangemouth Dockyard Co.	Grangemouth	United Kingdom	For Morecambe Steamboat Company (Limited).
28 April	Harold	Barque	Messrs. Robert Duncan & Co.	Port Glasgow	United Kingdom	For W. A. Stephens.
28 April	Inverallen	Steamship	Messrs. Richardson, Duck & Co.	South Stockton	United Kingdom	For John Mair.
28 April	Quito	Steamship	Messrs. Laird Bros.	Birkenhead	United Kingdom	For Pacific Steam Navigation Company.
28 April	Tavistock	Tug	Messrs. Newall & Co.	Bristol	United Kingdom	For Messrs. D. Radford & Co.
28 April	The Rose	Tug	Messrs. S. M'Knight & Co.	Ayr	United Kingdom	For Messrs. Barnes, Guthrie & Co.
28 April	Vesuvius	Dynamite gun cruiser	William Cramp & Sons	Philadelphia, Pennsylvania	United States	For United States Navy.
28 April	Vreda	Cutter	Ailsa Shipbuilding Co.	Troon	United Kingdom	For Thomas Hodgens.
28 April	USS Yorktown	Gunboat	William Cramp & Sons	Philadelphia, Pennsylvania	United States	For United States Navy.
30 April	Rapel	Steamship	Blyth Shipbuilding Co. Ltd	Blyth	United Kingdom	For Compagnia Sud Americana de Vapores.
30 April	Sung Kiang	Steamship	Messrs. Scott & Co.	Cartsdyke	United Kingdom	For China Navigation Company.
30 April	Wild Rose	Steamship	Messrs. John Fullarton & Co	Paisley	United Kingdom	For Messrs. Richard Hughes & Co.
April	Yauara	Yacht	David & William Henderson & Co.	Partick	United Kingdom	For Paul Ralli.
1 May	Nymphe	Nymphe-class sloop	Portsmouth Dockyard	Portsmouth	United Kingdom	For Royal Navy.
1 May	Rosedale	Bulk carrier	Sunderland Shipbuilding Co. Ltd	Sunderland	United Kingdom	For Hagarty & Co.
3 May	Amiral Cécille	Cruiser	Forges et Chantiers de la Méditerranée	La Seyne	France	For French Navy.
7 May	Unnamed	Steamship	Messrs. C. S. Swan, Hunter & Co.	Wallsend	United Kingdom	For Anglo-Scandinavian Steamship Company, Limited.
8 May	Jessmore	Steamship	Messrs. Oswald, Mordaunt & Co.	Southampton	United Kingdom	For Messrs. W. Johnston & Co.
9 May	Inanda	Steamship	Messrs. Hall, Russell & Co.	Aberdeen	United Kingdom	For Messrs. George & Alexander Rennie.
9 May	Unnamed	Paddle steamer	Messrs. Green	Blackwall	United Kingdom	For Messrs. Cousens.
10 May	Cayor	Steamship	Messrs. Archibald M'Millan & Son	Dumbarton	United Kingdom	For Messrs. Deves & Chaumet.
10 May	Endora	Barque	Messrs. Alexander Stephen & Sons	Dundee	United Kingdom	For Messrs. Alexander Stephen & Sons.
10 May	Frankfort	Steamship	Earle's Shipbuilding and Engineering Co.	Hull	United Kingdom	For Yorkshire Coal and Steamship Co. Ltd.
10 May	Partridge	Pygmy-class gunboat		Devonport Dockyard	United Kingdom	For Royal Navy.
11 May	Magda	Steamship	Messrs. W. Gray & Co.	West Hartlepool	United Kingdom	For Otto Trechmann.
12 May	Duke of Cornwall	Steamship	W. Gray & Co.	West Hartlepool	United Kingdom	For Cornwall Steamship Co. Ltd.
12 May	Magicienne	Marathon-class cruiser	Fairfield Shipbuilding and Engineering Company	Govan	United Kingdom	For Royal Navy.
12 May	Othon Stathatos	Steamship	Messrs. John Readhead & Sons	South Shields	United Kingdom	For Messrs. Stathatos Bros.
12 May	Shin-Sheng	Steamship	William Pickersgill & Sons	Sunderland	United Kingdom	For China Merchants Steam Navigation Company.
12 May	Wileysike	Steamship	Tyne Iron Shipbuilding Company	Willington Quay	United Kingdom	For private owner.
14 May	Benledi	Steamship	Messrs. Barclay, Curle & Co. (Limited).	Glasgow	United Kingdom	For Messrs. William Thomson & Co.
14 May	Lundy	Steamship	Messrs. Richardson, Duck & Co.	Stockton-on-Tees	United Kingdom	For Messrs. Farrar, Groves & Co.
14 May	Wylam	Merchantman	Sunderland Shipbuilding Co. Ltd	Sunderland	United Kingdom	For Atkinson Bros.
15 May	Baltimore City	Steamship	Messrs. Alexander Stephen & Son	Linthouse	United Kingdom	For Christopher Furness.
15 May	Banklands	Barque	Messrs. John Reid & Co.	Port Glasgow	United Kingdom	For Messrs. William Just & Co.
15 May	Cato	Steam yacht	Napier, Shanks & Bell	Yoker	United Kingdom	For Sir Edward Cecil Guinness.
15 May	Rangoon	Steam yawl	Cook, Welton & Gemmell	Hull	United Kingdom	For G. Beeching.
16 May	Lucille	Steam yacht	W. S. Cumming	Monkland Canal	United Kingdom	For John S. M'Andrew.
24 May	Alberta	Steamship	R. W. Hawthorn, Leslie & Co.	Hebburn	United Kingdom	For private owner.
24 May	Barbaris	Steam ketch	W. Jarvis	Anstruther	United Kingdom	For private owner.
24 May	Crest	Steamship	Joseph L. Thompson & Sons	Sunderland	United Kingdom	For Crest Shipping Co. Ltd., or Dent & Co.
24 May	Drumburlie	Steamship	Robert Thompson & Sons	Sunderland	United Kingdom	For Gillison & Chadwick.
24 May	Imperatrix	Steamship		Trieste	Austria-Hungary	For Österreichischer Lloyd.
24 May	Lucy Ashton	Paddle steamer	T. B. Seath & Co.	Rutherglen	United Kingdom	For North British Railway.
24 May	Maple Branch	Steamship	Bartram, Haswell & Co.	Sunderland	United Kingdom	For L. Hinrichsen.
24 May	Mavis	Paddle steamer	Messrs. John Scott & Co.	Greenock	United Kingdom	For General Steam Navigation Company.
24 May	Princess of Wales	Paddle steamer	Messrs. Barclay, Curle & Co.	Glasgow	United Kingdom	For Southampton and Isle of Wight Royal Mail Packet Co.
24 May	Unnamed	Steam launch	Messrs. William White & Co.	Greenock	United Kingdom	For Mr. Hale.
26 May	Ibis	Steamship	Messrs. W. B. Thompson	Dundee	United Kingdom	For Cork Steam Shipping Company (Limited).
26 May	Kathleen	Steamship	Osbourne, Graham & Co.	North Hylton	United Kingdom	For Pyman, Bell & Co.
26 May	Northgate	Steamship	Messrs. Thomas Turnbull & Son	Whitby	United Kingdom	For Messrs. Turnbull, Scott & Son.
26 May	Oswestry	Steamship	Messrs. Edward Withy & Co.	Hartlepool	United Kingdom	For Messrs. Sivewright, Bacon & Co.
26 May	Sea Mew	Steamship	Palmer's Shipbuilding and Iron Company (Limited)	Jarrow	United Kingdom	For General Steam Navigation Company.
26 May	Sultana	Steamship	Blyth Shipbuilding Co. Ltd	Blyth	United Kingdom	For Bailey & Leetham.
28 May	Legislator	Steamship	Messrs. Raylton Dixon & Co.	Middlesbrough	United Kingdom	For Messrs. T. & J. Harrison.
28 May	Goole No. 7	Tug	J. T. Eltringham	South Shields	United Kingdom	For private owner.
29 May	Asiatic Prince	Steamship	Short Bros.	Pallion	United Kingdom	For James Knott & partners.
29 May	Daphne	Nymphe-class sloop	Sheerness Dockyard	Sheerness	United Kingdom	For Royal Navy.
29 May	T. J. Potter	Paddle steamer	Oregon Railway and Navigation Company	Portland, Oregon	United States	For Oregon Railway and Navigation Company.
30 May	Freda	Steamship	The Naval Construction & Armament Co. Ltd.	Barrow-in-Furness	United Kingdom	For Argentine Steam Lighter Co. Ltd.
30 May	Gotha	Steamship	Earle's Shipbuilding and Engineering Company	Hull	United Kingdom	For Yorkshire Coal and Steam Shipping Company.
May	Clacton	Paddle steamer	Messrs. John Scott & Co.	Kirkcaldy	United Kingdom	For J. Scott & Co.
May	Dorothy	Yacht	W. Fyffe & Son	Fairlie	United Kingdom	For John Tennant.
May	Nellietoo	Yacht	W. Fyffe & Son	Fairlie	United Kingdom	For K. M. Clark.
May	Puffin	Yacht	W. Fyffe & Son	Fairlie	United Kingdom	For S. A. Hermon.
May	Sakkarah	Steam hopper barge	Messrs. Lobnitz & Co.	Renfrew	United Kingdom	For Suez Canal Company.
May	Sane	Steam hopper barge	Messrs. Lobnitz & Co.	Renfrew	United Kingdom	For Suez Canal Company.
May	Unnamed	Steam launch	W. Fyffe & Son	Fairlie	United Kingdom	For James Stevenson.
1 June	Aldborough	Steamship	Messrs. Russell & Co.	Port Glasgow	United Kingdom	For Frederick Woods.
1 June	Pamiat Azova	Cruiser	Baltic Works	Saint Petersburg	Russia	For Imperial Russian Navy.
7 June	Discovery	Steamship	Joseph L. Thompson & Sons	Sunderland	United Kingdom	For Rowland & Marwood.
9 June	Callisto	Steamship	William Doxford & Sons	Sunderland	United Kingdom	For Hudig & Veder.
9 June	Glenavon	Merchantman	Messrs. Russell & Co.	Greenock	United Kingdom	For Messrs. J. R. de Wolf & Co.
9 June	Medea	Marathon-class cruiser		Chatham Dockyard	United Kingdom	For Royal Navy.
11 June	Lindula	Steamship	Messrs. William Denny & Bros.	Dumbarton	United Kingdom	For British India Steam Navigation Company.
12 June	Derwent	Cargo liner	William Dobson and Company	Walker	United Kingdom	For Goole Steam Shipping Company.
12 June	Firth of Cromarty	Merchantman	Messrs. Russell & Co.	Port-Glasgow	United Kingdom	For Messrs. James Spencer & Co.
12 June	Kaiphong	Steamship	Messrs. Scott & Co.	Cartsdyke	United Kingdom	For China Navigation Company.
12 June	Kobe Maru	Steamship	London and Glasgow Engineering and Iron Shipbuilding Company	Govan	United Kingdom	For Nippon Yusen KK.
13 June	Courer	Torpedo boat	Messrs. Thorneycroft & Co.	Chiswick	United Kingdom	For French Navy.
14 June	Kistna	Steamship	Ailsa Shipbuilding Co.	Troon	United Kingdom	For British India Steam Navigation Company (Limited).
15 June	Leon-y-Castillo	Steamship	Messrs. David J. Dunlop & Co.	Port Glasgow	United Kingdom	For Messrs. Elder, Dempster & Co.
19 June	Ivy	Steamship	Charles Joseph Bigger	Londonderry	United Kingdom	For Glasgow, Dublin & Londonderry Steam Packet Co.
22 June	Peacock	Pygmy-class gunboat		Pembroke Dockyard	United Kingdom	For Royal Navy.
23 June	Alexandra	Paddle steamer	W. Allsup & Sons Ltd.	Preston	United Kingdom	For Devon & Cornwall Tamar Steam Packet Co. Ltd.
23 June	Alexandra	Tug	Messrs. M'Knight	Ayr	United Kingdom	For Alexandra Towing Company (Limited).
23 June	Oriole	Paddle steamer	Messrs. John Scott & Co.	Kirkcaldy	United Kingdom	For General Steam Navigation Company.
23 June	101	Barge	American Steel Barge Company	Duluth, Minnesota	United States	For Alexander McDougall.
25 June	Ancona	Steamship	Messrs. Ramage & Ferguson	Leith	United Kingdom	For Messrs. James Currie & Co.
25 June	Gulf of Corcovado	Cargo liner	Hawthorn Leslie and Company	Hebburn	United Kingdom	For Greenock Steamship Co.
25 June	Moray Chief	Barquentine or schooner	Mr. Kinloch	Kingston	United Kingdom	For Mr. Kinloch.
25 June	North Sea	Fishing trawler	Messrs. Hall, Russell & Co.	Aberdeen	United Kingdom	For William Pyper and others.
25 June	Unnamed	Paddle steamer	Messrs. Edward Finch & Co.	Chepstow	United Kingdom	For Sir William Thomas Lewis.
28 June	Lady Gordon	Steamship	Messrs. Aitken & Mansel	Kelvinhaugh	United Kingdom	For Ceylon Steamship Company (Limited).
28 June	Skeandhu	Steam yacht	Messrs. Fleming & Ferguson	Merksworth	United Kingdom	For Sholto D. C. Douglas.
June	Kaifong	Steamship	Messrs. Scott & Co.	Greenock	United Kingdom	For China Navigation Company.
June	Mermaid	Steamship	Mr. Watspon	Peel	Isle of Man	For The Peel and North of Ireland Steam Packet Company.
June	Paris	Paddle steamer	Fairfield Shipbuilding and Engineering Co.	Fairfield, Glasgow	United Kingdom	For London, Brighton and South Coast Railway and Chemins de Fer de l'Ouest.
June	Sinai	Steam hopper barge	Messrs. Lobnitz & Co.	Renfrew	United Kingdom	For Suez Canal Company.
June	Traveller	Steamship	Messrs. John & James Thomson	Glasgow	United Kingdom	For Messrs. Thomas & James Harrison.
June	Zagazic	Steam hopper barge	Messrs. Lobnitz & Co.	Renfrew	United Kingdom	For Suez Canal Company.
June	Three unnamed vessels	Paddle steamers	Messrs. M'Arthur & Co.	Paisley	United Kingdom	For Thomas Cook & Sons.
3 July	Ambrose Snow	Schooner	C. & R. Poillon	Brooklyn, New York	United States	For New York Pilots.
7 July	Equity	Cargo ship	Earle's Shipbuilding	Hull	United Kingdom	For Co-operative Wholesale Society Limited.
11 July	Islander	Steamship	Napier, Shanks & Bell	Yoker	United Kingdom	For Canadian-Pacific Navigation Company.
14 July	Gerent	Steamship	Short Bros.	Sunderland	United Kingdom	For James Westoll Line.
18 July	William H. Bateman	Schooner	C. & R. Poillon	Brooklyn, New York	United States	For John Handran.
19 July	Charleston	Protected Cruiser	Union Iron Works	San Francisco, California	United States	For United States Navy.
23 July	Trewarvas	Cargo ship	John Readhead & Sons	South Shields	United Kingdom	For Edward Hain and Son, St Ives, Cornwall
24 July	Palmas	Cargo ship	Harland & Wolff	Belfast	United Kingdom	For Sir A. L. Jones.
27 July	Pigmy	Pygmy-class gunboat		Sheerness Dockyard	United Kingdom	For Royal Navy.
4 August	Active	Tug	Union Iron Works	San Francisco, California	United States	For private owner.
7 August	Akagi	Gunboat	Onohama Shipyards	Kobe	Japan	For Imperial Japanese Navy.
9 August	Pass of Balmaha	Full-rigged ship	Robert Duncan and Company	Port Glasgow	United Kingdom	For Messrs. Gibson & Clark.
9 August	William Morphy	Steamship	Blyth Shipbuilding Co. Ltd	Blyth	United Kingdom	For Mediterranean Steamship Co. Ltd.
11 Augusgt	Medusa	Marathon-class cruiser		Chatham Dockyard	United Kingdom	For Royal Navy.
15 August	Conde del Venadito	Velasco-class cruiser		Cartagena	Spain	For Spanish Navy.
16 August	John V. Moran	Steamship	F. W. Wheeler & Co.	West Bay City, Michigan	United States	For Crescent Transportation Company.
18 August	Marathon	Marathon-class cruiser	Fairfields	Govan	United Kingdom	For Royal Navy.
23 August	Piemonte	Cruiser	Armstrong Whitworth	Newcastle upon Tyne	United Kingdom	For Regia Marina.
23 August	Sperber	Cruiser	Kaiserliche Werft	Danzig	Germany	For Kaiserliche Marine.
24 August	Elbridge T. Gerry	Schooner	Robinson & Waterhouse	City Island, New York	United States	For Edward Earl, Charles Foster, B. J. Guiness, William Hurrell, John Reardon and Hiram Treat.
25 August	Gut Heil	Tanker	William Armstrong, Mitchell & Co.	Newcastle upon Tyne	United Kingdom	For private owner.
30 August	Ettore Fieramosca	Etna-class protected cruiser	Cantiere navale fratelli Orlando	Livorno	Italy	For Regia Marina.
8 September	Ceylon	Steamship	John Blumer & Co.	Sunderland	United Kingdom	For Harloff & Bloe.
8 September	Peral	Submarine	Arsenal de la Carraca	San Fernando	Spain	For Spanish Navy.
8 September	Valkyrien	Cruiser	Orlogsværftet	Copenhagen	Denmark	For Royal Danish Navy.
20 September	Melpomene	Marathon-class cruiser		Portsmouth Dockyard	United Kingdom	For Royal Navy.
22 September	Atrato	Ocean liner	Robert Napier and Sons	Govan	United Kingdom	For Royal Mail Steam Packet Company
24 September	Gymnote	Submarine	Dupuy de Lôme, Gustave Zédé and Gaston Romazzotti	Toulon	France	For French Navy.
5 October	Akarana	Yacht	Robert Logan Sr.	Auckland	(United Kingdom of Great Britain and Ireland) New Zealand	For Robert Logan Sr.
6 October	Baltimore	Protected cruiser	William Cramp & Sons	Philadelphia, Pennsylvania	United States	For United States Navy.
6 October	Peninsular	Steamship	Messrs. Caird & Co.	Greenock	United Kingdom	For Peninsular and Oriental Steam Navigation Company.
7 October	Alligator	Paddle steamer		Norwalk, Florida	United States	For C. W. Howard.
9 October	Surcouf	Forbin-class cruiser	Arsenal de Cherbourg	Cherbourg	France	For French Navy.
10 October	Cufic	Livestock carrier	Harland & Wolff	Belfast	United Kingdom	For White Star Line.
13 October	Petrel	Gunboat	Columbia Iron Works and Dry Dock Company	Baltimore, Maryland	United States	For United States Navy.
15 October	Takao	Cruiser	Yokosuka Naval Arsenal	Yokosuka	Japan	For Imperial Japanese Navy.
16 October	Stanley	Icebreaker	Fairfield Shipbuilding and Engineering	Fairfield	United Kingdom	For Canadian Government.
17 October	Re Umberto	Re Umberto-class ironclad	Regio Cantiere di Castellammare di Stabia	Castellamare di Stabia	United Kingdom	For Regia Marina.
18 October	Grenade	Fusée-class gunboat	Arsenal de Lorient	Lorient	France	For French Navy
19 October	Paul Isenburg	Barque	Charles Joseph Bigger	Londonderry	United Kingdom	For J. C. Pfluger & Co.
20 October	City of Paris	Ocean liner	J & G Thompson	Clydebank	United Kingdom	For Inman Line.
22 October	Troude	Troude-class cruiser	Forges et Chantiers de la Gironde	Lormont	France	For French Navy.
1 November	Oldham	Cargo liner	Earle's Shipbuilding	Hull	United Kingdom	For Manchester, Sheffield and Lincolnshire Railway.
3 November	Croatia	Steamship	Blohm & Voss	Hamburg	Germany	For Hamburg Amerikanische Packetfahrt-Aktien-Gesellschaft.
3 November	James Stafford	Schooner		Noank, Connecticut	United States	For Charles Anderson, James Mitchell, Joseph Nelson, Frederick Ryerson and Oscar Stoffrelden.
3 November	Unnamed	Barque	Blohm & Voss	Hamburg	Germany	For private owner.
3 November	La Mouette	Ferry	Forges et Chantiers de la Méditerranée	La Seyne	France	For Soc. des bateaux à vapeur La Seyne-Toulon
7 November	Brésil	Steamship	Forges et Chantiers de la Méditerranée	La Seyne	France	For Cie. des Messageries Maritimes
17 November	Lord Londonderry	Cargo ship	Harland & Wolff	Belfast	United Kingdom	For Irish Shipowners Ltd.
23 November	Cupica	Barque	Charles Joseph Bigger	Londonderry	United Kingdom	For W. H. Ross & Co.
30 November	Sharpshooter	Sharpshooter-class torpedo gunboat		Devonport Dockyard	United Kingdom	For Royal Navy.
November	Britannic	Steamship	Bartram, Haswell & Co.	Sunderland	United Kingdom	For Britannic Steamship Co. Ltd.
1 December	Augusta Victoria	Ocean liner	Stettiner Maschinenbau AG Vulcan	Stettin	Germany	For Hamburg-Amerikanische Packetfahrt-Actien-Gesellschaft .
1 December	Governor Ames	Schooner	Leavitt-Storer	Waldoboro, Maine	United States	For Atlantic Shipping Company.
3 December	Coëtlogon	Forbin-class cruiser	Ateliers et Chantiers de Saint-Nazaire Penhoët	Saint-Nazaire	France	For French Navy.
4 December	Missouri	Steamship	William Gray & Company	West Hartlepool	United Kingdom	For private owner.
4 December	Research	Paddle survey ship		Chatham Dockyard	United Kingdom	For Royal Navy.
4 December	Dordogne	Steamship	Forges et Chantiers de la Méditerranée	Le Havre	France	For Cie. des Messageries Maritimes
8 December	Grimsby	Paddle steamer	Earle's Shipbuilding	Hull	United Kingdom	For Manchester, Sheffield and Lincolnshire Railway.
31 December	Alhea	Steamship	Raylton, Dixon & Co.	Middlesbrough-on-Tees	United Kingdom	For Christopher Furness.
31 December	Karoon	Steamship	William Gray & Co.	West Hartlepool	United Kingdom	For Thomas Appleby & Co.
31 December	Leven	Steamship	William Gray & Co.	West Hartlepool	United Kingdom	For R. Ropner & Co.
Unknown date	Alert	Humber Keel	William Bayley & Sons	Ipswich	United Kingdom	For William Bayley Jr.
Unknown date	Amy Gordon	Steamship	William Pickersgill & Sons	Sunderland	United Kingdom	For R. Gordon & Co.
Unknown date	Athabasca	Sternwheeler		Athabasca River	Canada	For Hudson's Bay Company.
Unknown date	Banan	Steamship	William Doxford	Sunderland	United Kingdom	For Det Søndenfjelds-Norske Dampskibsselskab.
Unknown date	Bard	Tug	A. J. Bridgman	Brentford	United Kingdom	For Hugh Hughes.
Unknown date	Beatrice	Merchantman	Bartram, Haswell & Co.	Sunderland	United Kingdom	For C. Howard & Son.
Unknown date	Bishopsgate	Steamship	Joseph L. Thompson & Sons	Sunderland	United Kingdom	For Bishopsgate Steam Ship Co. Ltd.
Unknown date	British Prince	Steamship	Short Bros.	Sunderland	United Kingdom	For James Knott.
Unknown date	Callao	Samar-class gunboat	Manila Ship Company	Cavite	(Spain) Spanish East Indies	For Spanish Navy.
Unknown date	Carl Hirschberg	Merchantman	S. P. Austin & Son	Sunderland	United Kingdom	For C. Hirschberg.
Unknown date	Cass	Steamship	Hawthorn, Leslie & Co. Ltd.	Newcastle upon Tyne	United Kingdom	For Formosa Trading Company.
Unknown date	Chamois	Merchantman	William Doxfore & Sons	Sunderland	United Kingdom	For Jackson Bros. & Cory.
Unknown date	Charlton	Merchantman	Joseph L. Thompson & Sons	Sunderland	United Kingdom	For W. & E. S. Lamplough.
Unknown date	City of Seattle	Paddle steamer	John Steffan	Portland, Oregon	United States	For West Seattle Land and Improvement Company.
Unknown date	Cyrene	Merchantman	Short Bros.	Sunderland	United Kingdom	For Lumsdon, Byers & Co.
Unknown date	Daniel	Merchantman	William Doxford & Sons	Sunderland	United Kingdom	For O. Joffre.
Unknown date	Drumfell	Merchantman	Robert Thompson & Sons	Sunderland	United Kingdom	For Gillison & Chadwick.
Unknown date	Eber Ward	Steamship	F. W. Wheeler & Co.	West Bay City, Michigan	United States	For Detroit & Lake Superior Line.
Unknown date	Edendale	Merchantman	James Laing	Sunderland	United Kingdom	For P. H. Laing.
Unknown date	Elena Oms	Merchantman	Sunderland Shipbuilding Co. Ltd	Sunderland	United Kingdom	For Demetrio Cuetara & Co.
Unknown date	Elf	Yacht	George Lawley & Son	South Boston, Massachusetts	United States	For William H. Wilkinson.
Unknown date	Enterprize	Merchantman	Joseph L. Thompson & Sons	Sunderland	United Kingdom	For Rowland & Marwood.
Unknown date	Equator	Schooner	Mathew Turner	Benica, California	United States	For private owner.
Unknown date	Eugéne Pereire	Steamship		Saint-Nazaire	France	For private owner.
Unknown date	Gemini	Merchantman	John Priestman & Co.	Sunderland	United Kingdom	For J. G. Hill.
Unknown date	George H. Dyer	Bulk carrier	Wolf & Davidson	Milwaukee, Wisconsin	United States	For private owner.
Unknown date	George W. Pride	tug	William Cramp & Sons	Philadelphia, Pennsylvania	United States	For John D. Spreckels Brothers' Company.
Unknown date	Hamburg	Merchantman	William Doxford & Sons	Sunderland	United Kingdom	For Svenska Lloyd Fornyäde A/B.
Unknown date	Henry Bailey	Sternwheeler		Tacoma	(United States) Washington Territory	For Pacific Navigation Company.
Unknown date	Horizon	Barque	Charles Joseph Bigger	Londonderry	United Kingdom	For Estier Frères.
Unknown date	Junio	Merchantman	William Doxford & Sons	Sunderland	United Kingdom	For Compania Bilbaina de Navegaçion.
Unknown date	Kirkland	Paddle steamer	T. W. Lake	Lake Washington	(United States) Washington Territory	For Jackson Street Cable Railway Company.
Unknown date	Kong Frode	Steamship	William Doxford & Sons	Sunderland	United Kingdom	For Det Søndenfjelds-Norske Dampskibsselskab.
Unknown date	Lyndhurst	Merchantman	William Pickersgill & Sons	Sunderland	United Kingdom	For Morel Ltd.
Unknown date	Macassa	Steamship	William Hamilton & Co.	Port Glasgow	United Kingdom	For Hamilton Steamboat Company.
Unknown date	Marion	Sternwheeler	Alexander Watson	Golden	Canada	For Frank P. Armstrong.
Unknown date	Mark Hopkins	Lumber hooker	Mechanics Dry Dock Company	Grand Haven, Michigan	United Kingdom	For Harris Baker.
Unknown date	May Durr	Lumber hooker	Milwaukee Shipyard Company	Milwaukee, Wisconsin	United States	For John Spry Lumber Co.
Unknown date	Nether Holme	Merchantman	Joseph L. Thompson & Sons	Sunderland	United Kingdom	For Hine Bros.
Unknown date	Northumbria	Collier	Joseph L. Thompson & Sons	Sunderland	United Kingdom	For International Line Steam Ship Co. Ltd.
Unknown date	Ohio	Steamship	James Laing	Sunderland	United Kingdom	For Neptune Steam Navigation Co. Ltd.
Unknown date	Onset	Motorboat	Hacketts	Bayonne, New Jersey	United States	For private owner.
Unknown date	Oporto	Steamship	Charles Joseph Bigger	Londonderry	United Kingdom	For S.S. Oporto Co. Ltd.
Unknown date	Patapsco	Merchantman	James Laing	Sunderland	United Kingdom	For Harrison & Dixon.
Unknown date	Plover	Pygmy-class gunboat		Pembroke Dockyard	United Kingdom	For Royal Navy.
Unknown date	Portslade	Merchantman	Robert Thompson & Sons	Sunderland	United Kingdom	For Stephenson, Clarke & Co.
Unknown date	Relandersgrund	Lightship	William Crichton & Co.	Turku	(Russian Empire) Grand Duchy of Finland	For Finnish Maritime Administration.
Unknown date	Ruysdael	Steamship	Joseph L. Thompson & Sons	Sunderland	United Kingdom	For Bolton & Kenneth.
Unknown date	Sea Wing	Sternwheeler		Diamond Bluff, Wisconsin	United States	For Diamond Jo Line.
Unknown date	Seneca	Steam yacht		Boston, Massachusetts	United States	For private owner.
Unknown date	Serica	Steamship	Sunderland Shipbuilding Co. Ltd.	Sunderland	United Kingdom	For R. Gordon & Co.
Unknown date	Sidor Shibaev	Tanker	Kolomna Locomotive Works	Kolomna	Russia	For private owner.
Unknown date	Smeul	Torpedo boat	Forges et Chantiers de la Méditerranée	Le Havre	France	For Romanian Navy.
Unknown date	Sneaton	Steamship	John Blumer & Co	Sunderland	United Kingdom	For Robinson Brothers Steamship Co. Ltd.
Unknown date	Tangier	Merchantman	William Doxford & Sons	Sunderland	United Kingdom	For Angier Line (1887) Ltd.
Unknown date	T. M. Richardson	Steamboat	James T. Chatterton	Oneatta, Oregon	United States	For James T. Chatterton.
Unknown date	Trifels	Steamship	Sunderland Shipbuilding Co. Ltd.	Sunderland	United Kingdom	For Deutsche Dampfschiffahrts-Gesellschaft Hansa.
Unknown date	Triton	Tug	John H. Dialogue	Camden, New Jersey	United States	For P. Dougherty & Co.
Unknown date	Umlazi	Merchantman	James Laing	Sunderland	United Kingdom	For Bullard, King & Co. Ltd.
Unknown date	Unionist	Steamship	Strand Slipway Co.	Sunderland	United Kingdom	For Angier Steam Shipping Co. Ltd.
Unknown date	Vedra	Steamship	Short Bros.	Sunderland	United Kingdom	For J. S. Barwick & Co.
Unknown date	Wangpoo	Steamship		Shanghai	China	For Compagnie des Messageries Maritimes.
Unknown date	William Branfoot	Steamship	Joseph L. Thompson & Sons	Sunderland	United Kingdom	For Tyzack & Branfoot Steam Shipping Company.
Unknown date	Wyer G. Sargent	Schooner		Sedgwick, Maine	United States	For private owner.
Unknown date	Not named	Tug	John H. Dialogue	Camden, New Jersey	United States	For United States Navy. Subsequently sold to P. Dougherty Sons, & Co and named Douglas H. Thomas.
