= Acheron class =

Acheron class may refer to:

- Amphion, A, or Acheron-class diesel-electric submarines of the British Royal Navy, ordered in 1943, for service in the Pacific Ocean theater of World War II.
- Acheron-class destroyers of the Royal Navy, a class of twenty destroyers, all built under the 1910–11 Programme and completed between 1911 and 1912, which served during World War I.
- Acheron-class torpedo boats, a class of two torpedo boats built in Sydney for the New South Wales naval service in 1879.
- Achéron-class ironclad gunboat, a class of two gunboats built between 1882–1890 for the French Navy.
