= USS Triton (YT-10) =

Tugboat of the United States Navy

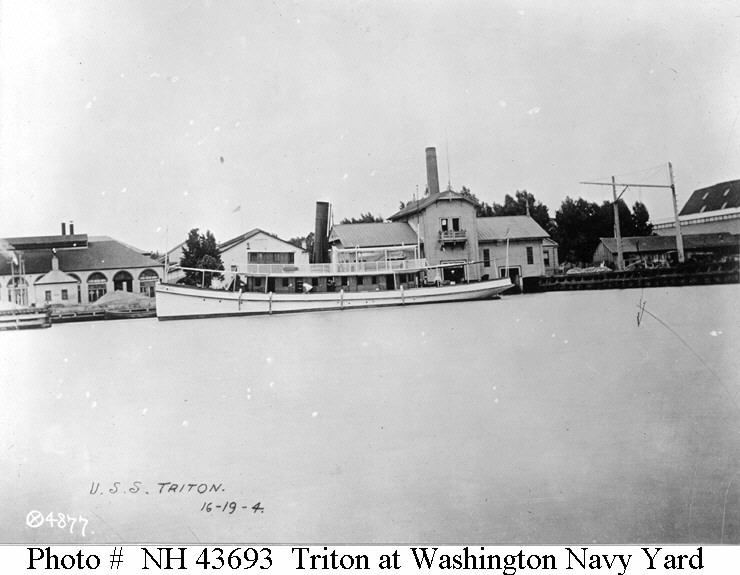

History

United States
- Name: USS Triton
- Namesake: Triton, a Greek demigod of the sea.
- Builder: John H. Dialogue, Camden, NJ
- Launched: 1888
- Acquired: Purchased September 1889
- Reclassified: YT-10 (17 July 1921)
- Stricken: 19 May 1930
- Fate: Sold 15 September 1930

General characteristics
- Type: Yard tug
- Displacement: 212 tons
- Length: 107 ft (33 m) (overall)
- Beam: 20 ft 9 in (6.32 m)
- Draft: 9 ft (2.7 m) mean
- Propulsion: 300 hp triple-expansion steam, single screw propeller
- Speed: 13 knots

The first USS Triton (later YT-10) was an iron-hulled tug purchased by the U.S. Navy in 1889. After more than 40 years of service as a Navy yard tug, she was sold off in 1930 and began a second career as a commercial tug.

Triton was built in 1888, hull no. 287 at the John H. Dialogue shipyard in Camden, New Jersey. She was built for P. Dougherty & Company, a Baltimore-based towing firm, and named the Douglas H. Thomas after a prominent Baltimore banker with ties to local shipping. Her official U.S. number was 157229.

== Construction ==
The Triton's hull was of riveted iron construction, with a long deckhouse topped by the pilot house. Her tonnage was 140.52 gross and 70.21 net. Her principal dimensions were: length 107 ft (33 m) overall and 96.75 ft (29.49 m) between perpendiculars; beam 20.6 ft (6.3 m), and hull depth 10.8 ft (3.3 m). She displaced 212 tons (216 Mtons) at a mean draft of 8 ft 10 in (2.69 m).

She was fitted with a dual-furnace coal-burning Scotch (fire tube) boiler, 11 ft (3.4 m) long by 9 ft (2.7 m) diameter, with 0.712 in (18.1 mm) thick boiler plating. The boiler was rated for up to 150 psi (1,000 kPa), but ordinary working pressure was 120 psi (830 kPa). Coal capacity was 43 tons, and she burned about two tons per 24 hours.

She was equipped with a 300 hp (220 kW) reversible triple expansion steam engine. Cylinder diameters were 13 in (330 mm), 21 in (530 mm), and 22 in (560 mm), with a 24 in (610 mm) stroke.

== Navy service ==
Triton spent her entire career operating from the Washington Navy Yard at Washington, D.C. She frequently steamed down the Potomac River to the naval reservation at Indian Head, Maryland; during 1900 alone, she recorded 198 round-trips between Washington and Indian Head. During Triton's career, Indian Head was home first to the Naval Proving Grounds in the 1890s and then to the Naval Powder Factory during the first half of the 20th century; in all probability, Triton towed barges to Indian Head laden with materials to be used there in the testing of naval guns and in the production of gunpowder and explosives.

On 17 July 1921, the Navy changed Triton's designation to "YT-10" (yard tug) in accordance with the new system of alphanumeric hull designations adopted that day.

After 41 years of Navy service, the Triton was finally stricken from the Navy Directory on 19 May 1930, and sold on 15 September 1930.

== Subsequent history ==
She was bought by a Boston-based towing firm in 1932 and named Melrose. Her steam propulsion system was replaced with a 640 hp (480 kW) diesel-electric system. She spent the next 13 years plying New England waters.

In 1945, she was acquired by the Steers Sand and Gravel Company, of New York, and named J Rich Steers, then renamed Gwendoline Steers in 1951. She was lost with all nine crew members on 30 December 1962, at the entrance to Huntington Bay (Long Island Sound), NY, during a brutal winter gale.
