= Dialogue & Company =

Shipbuilding firm

Coordinates: 39.93909°N 75.13164°W

Dialogue and Company shipyard as it appeared in a newspaper advertisement in New York Daily Graphic in 1875.

Dialogue & Company was a shipbuilding firm located in the Port of Camden on the Delaware River in New Jersey. It was founded by John H. Dialogue.

Born in 1828, Dialogue moved at age 30 to Kaighn’s Point in Camden. In 1862, he and several partners founded the National Iron Armor and Shipbuilding Company, which opened a year later. The first boat to be built at the shipyard was the 25-ton screw-driven Lookout.

In 1870, the shipyard was renamed River Iron Works, Dialogue & Wood, proprietors. The first boat to be built at this facility was the 48-ton screw-driven Frank G. Fowler. On the death of Mr. Wood, Mr. Dialogue took over control of the business.

By the late 19th century, the shipyard grew to 34 acres (140,000 m^{2}) with 2,000 feet (610 m) of waterfront, employing up to 800 workers. The shipyard produced numerous tugboats for the civilian market and for the U.S. Navy. In 1871, the shipyard was building iron vessels ordered by the Revenue Marine department, such as the United States Steamship Colfax. In 1876, the company helped restore the USS Constitution. In 1878, the yard began to build compound engine tugboats. And, during the Spanish–American War, the shipyard completed and launched the United States Navy gunboat Princeton, which was sent to the Caribbean and was decommissioned in 1919.

John H. Dialogue died in 1898. His son, John H. Dialogue, Jr., took over the business and ran it until it failed just before World War I.
