= French ironclad gunboat Fusée =

History

France
- Name: Fusée
- Ordered: 5 August 1882
- Builder: Arsenal de Lorient
- Laid down: 10 October 1882
- Launched: 8 May 1884
- Completed: October 1887
- Decommissioned: 15 October 1910
- Stricken: 24 March 1910
- Fate: Sold for scrap, 24 August 1912

General characteristics (as built)
- Class & type: Fusée-class ironclad gunboat
- Displacement: 1,128 t (1,110 long tons)
- Length: 50.66 m (166 ft 2 in) (o/a)
- Beam: 9.95 m (32 ft 8 in)
- Draft: 3.5 m (11 ft 6 in)
- Installed power: 3 cylindrical boilers; 1,500 ihp (1,100 kW)
- Propulsion: 2 propellers, 2 compound-expansion steam engines
- Speed: 12 knots (22 km/h; 14 mph)
- Range: 850 nmi (1,570 km; 980 mi) at 8 knots (15 km/h; 9.2 mph)
- Complement: 93
- Armament: 1 × single 24 cm (9.4 in) gun; 1 × single 90 mm (3.5 in) gun; 4 × 5-barrel 37 mm (1.5 in) revolver cannon; 1 × 356 mm (14 in) torpedo tube
- Armor: Steel armor; Waterline belt: 160–270 mm (6.3–10.6 in); Barbette: 120–200 mm (4.7–7.9 in); Deck (ship): 20 mm (0.8 in)

Fusée was the lead ship of her class of ironclad gunboats built for the French Navy during the 1880s. Completed in 1887, she spent most of her career in reserve. The ship was sold for scrap in 1912.

== Bibliography ==
- Campbell, N. J. M. (1979). "The Netherlands". In Gardiner, Robert (ed.). Conway's All the World's Fighting Ships 1860–1905. Greenwich: Conway Maritime Press. pp. 371–377. ISBN 978-0-8317-0302-8.
- Roberts, Stephen S. (2021). French Warships in the Age of Steam 1859–1914: Design, Construction, Careers and Fates. Barnsley, UK: Seaforth Publishing. ISBN 978-1-5267-4533-0.
- Roche, Jean-Michel (2005). Dictionnaire des bâtiments de la flotte de guerre française de Colbert à nos jours [Dictionary of French Warships from Colbert to Today] (in French). Vol. Tome I: 1671–1870. Toulon: Roche. ISBN 978-2-9525917-0-6. OCLC 165892922.
