= Gwendoline Steers =

American tugboat

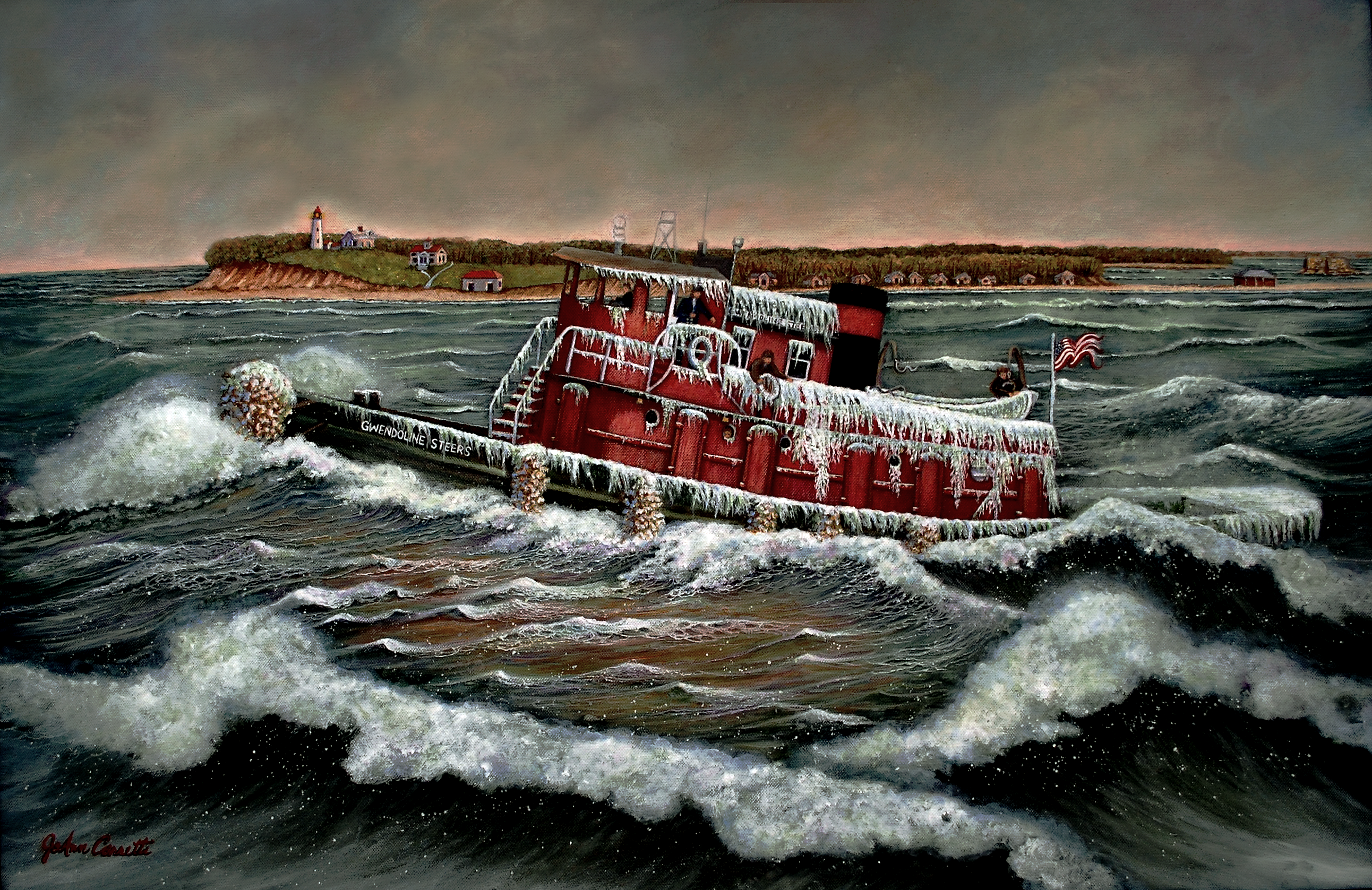
- "Last Moments" the Sinking of the Steers

History

United States
- Name: Gwendoline Steers
- Namesake: Gwendoline Steers, wife of company Pres
- Owner: Steers Sand & Gravel Company
- Builder: John H. Dialogue of Camden, New Jersey
- Yard number: Hull #287
- Launched: 1888
- Decommissioned: May 19, 1930
- Fate: Sank in ice storm December 30, 1962

General characteristics
- Class & type: tugboat
- Tonnage: 140.52 grt
- Displacement: 70.26 net
- Length: 96.5 ft (29.4 m)
- Beam: 20.6 ft (6.3 m)
- Draft: fwd 8 ft (2.4 m) aft 10 ft (3.0 m)
- Decks: two decks
- Installed power: originally 1 reciprocating 240 HP steam engine, converted to 640 HP diesel
- Propulsion: single screw propeller
- Speed: 13 knots (24 km/h)
- Crew: 9

The Gwendoline Steers was a tugboat owned by the Steers Sand & Gravel Company of New York, NY (incorrectly spelled "Gwendolyn Steers" in some newspaper accounts). It sank in an ice storm in Long Island Sound approaching the mouth of Huntington Bay, New York on December 30, 1962, with the loss of the entire crew of nine.

== Construction and design ==
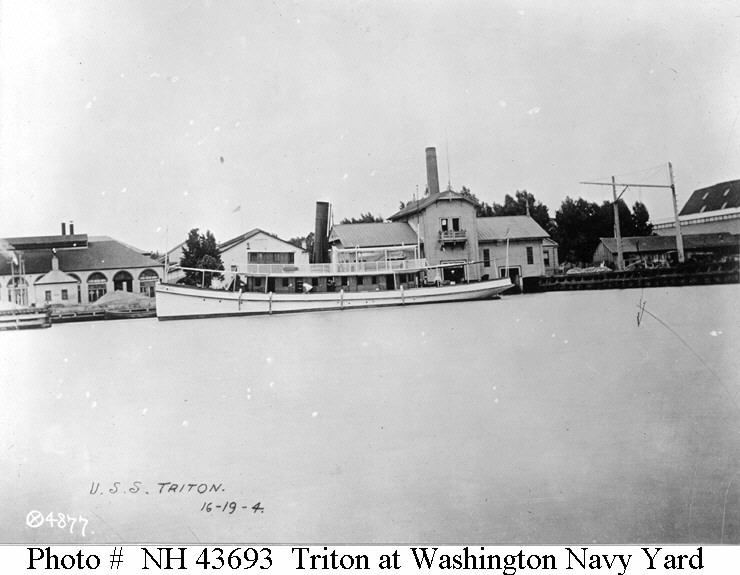
USS Triton at the Washington Navy Yard, ca. 1900

The tug was laid in Camden, New Jersey, in 1888 as hull #287 by the John H. Dialogue Shipyard and originally intended for the United States Navy. Dialogue had smelted the pig-iron kentledge from the USS Constitution for the hull. The Navy delayed receipt, and Dialogue sold the tug to the P. Dougherty & Sons Company (a Baltimore-based towing company), who christened her the Steam Tug Douglas H. Thomas. Her dimensions were documented as 140.52 gross tons, 70.26 net tons, 96.5 ft length x 20.6 ft beam x 10.8 ft depth. Her drafts were 8 ft forward and 10 ft aft. She was fitted with a single propeller, driven by a 240 HP triple expansion steam engine (13-, 21- and 22-inch diam cylinders by 26-inch stroke), and a two-furnace Scotch boiler (11 ft long x 9 ft diam) with a rated working pressure of 150 psi. Coal capacity was 43 tons, and she reportedly burned about two tons in a 24-hour run.

In September, 1889, the Navy reversed its decision, and paid the P. Doherty & Sons Company $30,000 for the acquisition, and re-christened the tug USS Triton and given a numerical number as well (Harbor Tug No. 10). The tug was assigned to the Washington Navy Yard where it spent 41 years working from 1889 to 1930.

=== Notable Navy Service ===
1) During the summer of 1898 at the height of the Spanish–American War, President William McKinley canceled his vacation to remain in Washington. According to The New York Times and Chicago Daily Tribune, he took frequent evening cruises with his Cabinet aboard her on the Potomac to escape the city heat of Washington, DC. The decision to accept the terms of surrender of Spain ending the Spanish-American War took place on the vessel.

2) The very first females in the US Armed Forces, known as the Golden 14, were assigned to her in 1917. This also constituted the first assignment of a black female in the US Armed Forces. These enlisted woman were assigned to the Triton due to the vessel being previously outfitted with amenities for executive use and being stateside under the careful watch of Secretary of the Navy.

3) One of her early captains was Samuel F Lomax, a Civil War naval officer

On 17 July 1920, the Navy changed Triton's designation from "Harbor Tug No. 10" to (Yard Tug) "YT-10" in accordance with the new system of alphanumeric hull designations adopted that day. Triton YT-10 was decommissioned and removed from the Naval register on May 19, 1930.

== Post Navy Service history ==
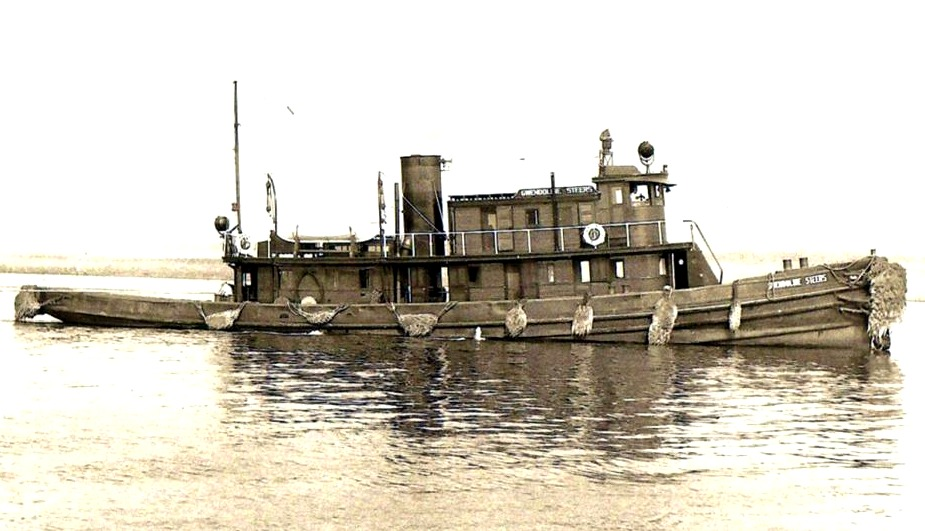
Note second decking was removed. Otherwise tug hull and lower house remained largely the same

The tug was sold by the Navy on September 15, 1930, to a New England interest, and the vessel appears on the Merchant Registry in 1932 as the "Melrose" of Boston, MA. At that time, her 240 HP steam engine was removed along with the tall steam smoke stack, and she was re-engined with a 640 HP diesel motor and new shorter smoke stack.

In 1945, she was purchased by Steers Sand & Gravel and was renamed J. Rich Steers after the company's president. As the J. Rich Steers, she is believed to have been the flagship.

In 1951, Steers renamed the tug Gwendoline Steers after acquiring a newer tug and naming it J. Rich Steers. The Gwendoline was used to transport barges of sand from the company's sand mining operations on Long Island, NY to various cement yards in the greater New York City metropolitan area. The company had a large waterfront sandmine in Northport bordered by James Street to the south, Ocean Avenue to the east, and Eaton's Neck Road to the north.

== The Disaster ==
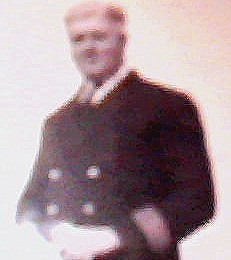
Capt. Herbert Dickman

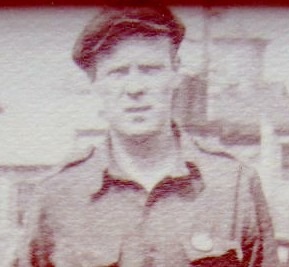
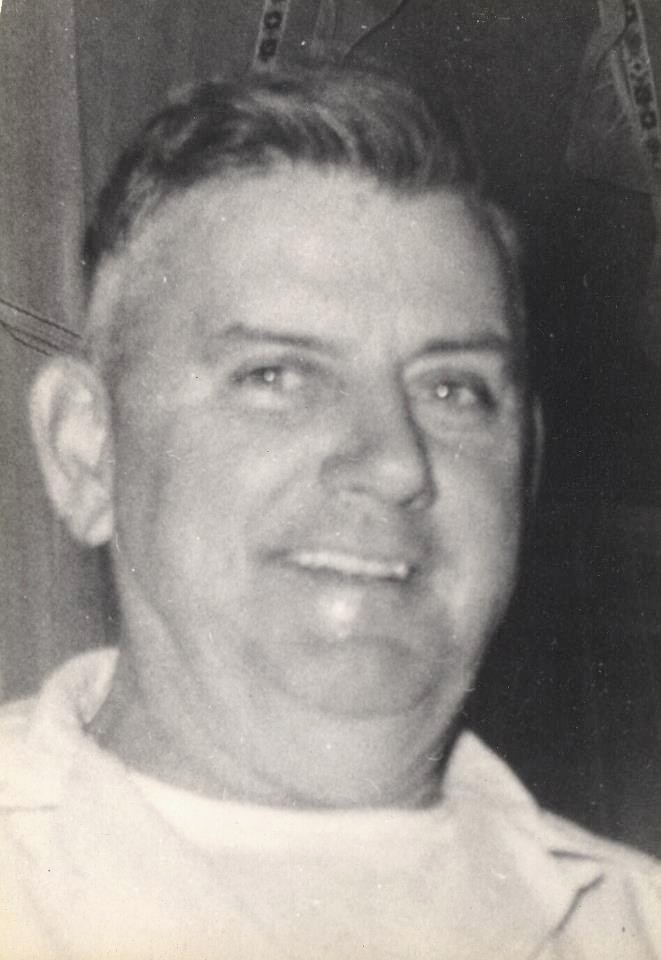
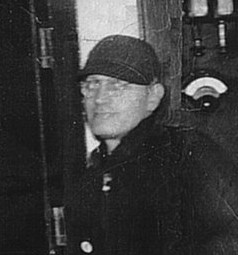
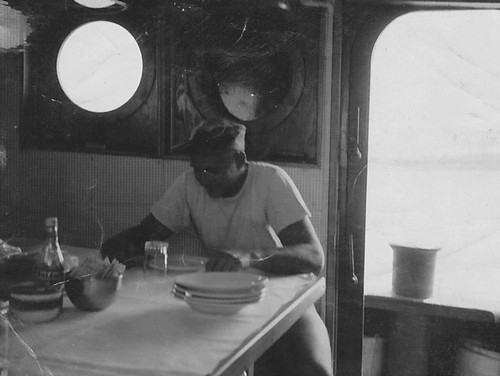

On Sunday, December 30, 1962, Gwendoline Steers left New York City at 11:30am on a routine trip to Northport, Long Island. Aboard the tug was Captain Herbert Dickman, who had thirty years experience working on tugboats. His crew consisted of eight men including Captain Robert E. Nolan; Engineers Ray Harrison and Hugh A. Reid; Deck Hands Robert E. Knox, Roy L. Burnett, Rasmus Nordvik, and John Iverson; and Ship's Cook Claude A. Markell.

The voyage began with mild wind and placid conditions. Temperatures were about 50 degrees F. But as the day progressed, an approaching cold front of severe magnitude caused the weather to turn from calmness to fury. By mid afternoon, the “weather began to turn sour.”. The temperature had dropped to just "2 degrees above zero," and the wind velocity was "recorded at 58 to 60 m.p.h. at 3:30pm." This constituted a 50 degree temperature drop from the morning, and created violent winds.

At 4:30 in the afternoon, Capt. Dickman radioed the Coast Guard Station at Eaton's Neck reporting the tug was “an hour overdue for its Northport destination and that it was shipping water" but that “the pumps and engines were working properly.” The Station Commander, Chief Warrant Officer George C. Bannan, said the Coast Guard would “attempt to launch rescue craft,” if the tug's situation deteriorated, and both parties “agreed to repeat radio contact in one hour in order to keep check on the ship’s progress.” An hour later, the Coast Guard attempted to contact Gwendoline Steers without success.

The Coast Guard continued to attempt to make contact to no avail as the weather deteriorated sharply. “Waves turned to giant proportions. Reports from Long Island and Connecticut claimed 10 to 12 foot waves with gusts of wind up to 90 m.p.h.” Coast Guard Station Eaton's Neck was unable to launch their own craft, and it was decided that the USCGC Yeaton, a “125-foot search and rescue vessel based in New London, Connecticut,” be launched instead. But this search and rescue vessel would not be on the scene until the next morning. While underway, Yeaton "was only able to make speed of only 2 or 3 knots due to the weather condition" and "experienced severe icing which ultimately forced her to turn back." Evening news and radio reported that a Steers tugboat was missing, and many of the victim's families first learned of the situation in this fashion.

== Aftermath ==
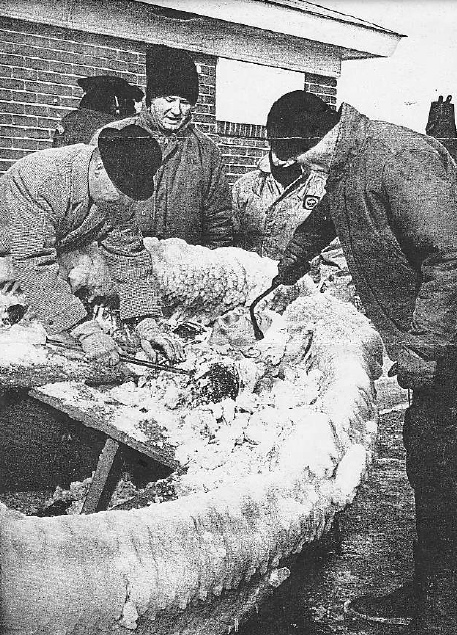
Lifeboat containing the body of Hugh Reid at Hobart Beach on Eaton's Neck, NY

The following morning, the tug's lifeboat was found at Hobart Beach on Eatons Neck, NY with the body of Second Engineer Hugh Reid. The lifeboat and body were encased in sea ice. A full-page photograph was captured and published in the January 11, 1963 edition of LIFE magazine. On January 4, 1963, Capt. Dickman's body was found at the Nissequogue Town Beach, and the next day the body of Robert Knox was found at West Meadow Beach in Stony Brook, his hand still entwined in a life ring.

On January 3 and 10, 1963, Captain Frederick K. Arzt of the Coast Guard opened a Board of Inquiry and questioned witnesses under oath. A number of Eaton's Neck residents gave sworn testimony, including a nine-year-old boy. Capt. Arzt's reported to local newspapers that his findings were inconclusive. Witnesses stated that the tug had been heading south into the sheltered waters of Huntington when it abruptly turned around and faced North into the storm, without making any headway. To complicate matters, no witness actually saw the tug sink. With salt spray on windows and the high winds and fading light, most witnesses had been watching the tug intermittently from their homes, and at some point noticed that it was gone.

On April 11, 1963, Captain Robert Nolan's body was identified at the entrance to Centerport Harbor utilizing his ID buttoned into his pocket. Just “Two hours later on the shore of nearby Smithtown Bay,” the body of Ray Harrison was discovered.

Despite a number of vessels looking for the tug in the ensuing weeks and months, the location of the wreck remained elusive. On April 13, 1963, another Steers tug that had been searching for months found a rope floating on the water attached to a broken tug mast. Divers were dispatched, and the tug was located "lying in about forty feet of water,” and sitting upright and intact in the mud, her superstructure only twenty-feet below the surface. Three divers performed an inspection of the hull, but did not find any hull damage or bodies.

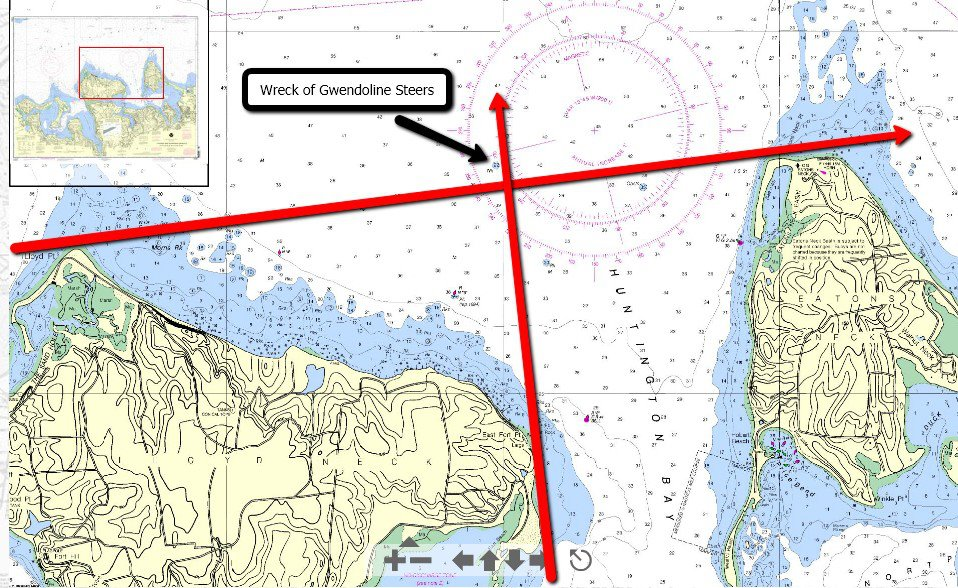
The Wreck was finally located as shown on Map

By April 18, 1963, preparations were being made by Steers to dynamite the wreck. According to the owners of the tug, “the purpose of finding the boat was to locate bodies, not the hull." The President of Steers Sand and Gravel Company, J. Rich Steers, stated that “we’ve already written off the value of the hull” and that divers “combed the interior of the ship despite the thick mud which entombs her hold...[they] found no one aboard her.” While the United States Army Corps of Engineers conducted their own review for the proposed demolition, a private marine salvage firm with no connection to Steers, “filed for salvage rights” and that “salvages rights [were] being negotiated.” The U.S. Army Corps of Engineers stated that the Gwendoline Steers “would have to be removed from the federal channel.” regardless of whether Steers dynamited the wreck, or the salvage company raised the vessel for scrap. One week later, the Army Corps abruptly reversed their decision. The salvage company also dropped their claim.

Between May 3 and May 20, the bodies of Rasmus Nordvick, Claude Markell and John Iverson were recovered; two were found in Long Island Sound, and one on Crescent Beach in Huntington, NY. On May 26, 1963, the body of Roy L. Burnett was recovered.

== Unsettled Issues ==
A number of unsettled issues have remained:

1) The inconclusiveness of the Coast Guard inquiry to reach a cause of the sinking.

2) The perception of the victim's families that Steers was unwilling to raise the vessel and properly inspect the hull for fear of finding defects or an unseaworthy condition.

3) Damage the hull received in an accidental grounding off Greenwich, CT the week before on December 22, 1962. Although the welder who performed the repair gave testimony at the inquiry, the integrity of the repair and whether it was a factor in the sinking was not determined since a decision was made to not raise the wreck.

4) Questions as to why the tug had been dispatched to Northport, NY on a Sunday of a holiday weekend. Several families reported that they were told by Steers the night the tug disappeared that the tug was going to secure a barge in Northport. The CG's initial report states that the tug was sent to "re-secure some scows in that area." Persistent rumors have circulated to date that the tug was sent to partake in a New Year's activity, and not to secure scows.

5) Reversal of the Army Corps' demand for removal of the tug one week after insisting it posed a navigation hazard.

6) How the crew had the time to launch a lifeboat, an involved process using davits and blocks, yet testimony of witnesses suggested a fast sinking, and why only one crew member made it into the boat.

7) Why bodies were found in three time clusters: 4 days after the tragedy (3 bodies), one afternoon in April (2 bodies), and during a three-week period in May (4 bodies).

8) Families have claimed that Capt. Artz's report was not furnished to them. The report cannot be located at USCG HQ in Washington DC, nor at the National Archives.

9) The lifeboat containing the body of Hugh Reid went missing after being delivered to Coast Guard Station Eaton's Neck.

10) Why the tug turned back and headed out into open water as the storm intensified with sunlight fading.

== Analysis of events leading up to sinking ==
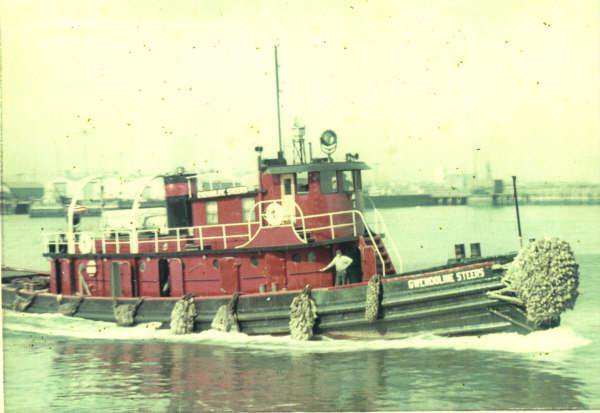
Gwendoline Steers ca 1955

A forensic analysis of the events leading up to the sinking have been provided by Capt. Gerard E. Thornton of NY as follows:

The tug was reported as leaving the Whitestone stakeboat at 1300 that afternoon. The run between Whitestone and the east end of the Captain Islands (off Greenwich, CT) is approx. 16 miles. The tug reported to the dispatcher at 1525 that they were east of Captain (probably Great Captain) Island. This puts the tug's speed at around 6.5 knots. Considering the weather she was heading into, this seems correct. Capt. Dickman may have slowed the boat to ease her motion. The next reported position comes at 1630, when Dickman notified the Coast Guard that he was 2 miles west of Eatons Neck, and taking some water.

The question is - did Dickman turn his tug ESE after passing the Captain Islands, and begin taking the NW wind (large arrow on chart below) on the port quarter, or did he continue another half an hour until the tug was abeam of the Stamford breakwater, a familiar landmark to him, and then turn southeast. This route would have allowed for the wind and sea to follow the tug, and reduce the rolling. It is my thought that had he continued along his course, he would have been abeam of Stamford at 1600, and may have opted for putting into harbor there, as it was well protected and deep enough for the tug's draft.

The chart I've attached shows the two courses possibly taken by the tug after passing the Captains. Both would have resulted in arrival in Huntington Bay at approximately the same time. The Stamford route was longer, but the tug would have picked up speed running before the wind. If the tug changed course after the Captains, the tug would have been behaving more violently with the quartering sea. The main point is - he chose to head for Northport. Perhaps looking forward to the New Years holiday, the crew would have had a "let's go for it" disposition. The men knew the tug well, and trusted her. It was just going to be another blow, nothing to worry about.

At 1630, the tug reports to the Coast Guard at the entrance to Huntington Bay. At 1640, the tug again communicated with the Coast Guard station. This time the captain reported that the sea state was 6 to 8 feet. At this point, the Poling Bros. tanker passes her on their way out into the Sound. Perhaps this causes Dickman to rethink his plan to make Northport. The bay would have been in a state of upheaval in the NW wind. If he attempted to make the turn past Sand City, and the boat strayed off course in the wind, perhaps the tug would touch bottom or ground on the passage into the inner harbor. The boat would have been at the mercy of the weather if that happened. Some captains, and rightly so, decide to weather storms at sea, rather than to be beaten to death against a pier or at a mooring.

It is unknown what caused Captain Dickman to come about and head back into the Sound. Maybe he wished to follow the tanker and move in tandem to a safe haven. Perhaps the decision was based on a far more sinister condition. At the prevailing temperature of zero degrees, each wave that broke against the tug would have frozen solid along the sides of the tug. The ice would have accumulated inch by inch, crusting over the railings and then the pilothouse windows, until the tug's shape no longer was recognizable. Sometime within the course of 20 minutes, after the vessel started back out to the Sound, the crew realized they were in great peril. The tug, weighed down by the ice, and likely heeling to one side, would have become sluggish to respond her helm orders. The engineers would have been monitoring the conditions in the engine room, reporting their findings to the wheelhouse. Soon - the order was called to ready the lifeboat. The lights of Northport, so tantalizingly close, would suddenly appear very distant.

A more comprehensive analysis written by Tom Jordan can be found here.

== Wreck Diving Site ==
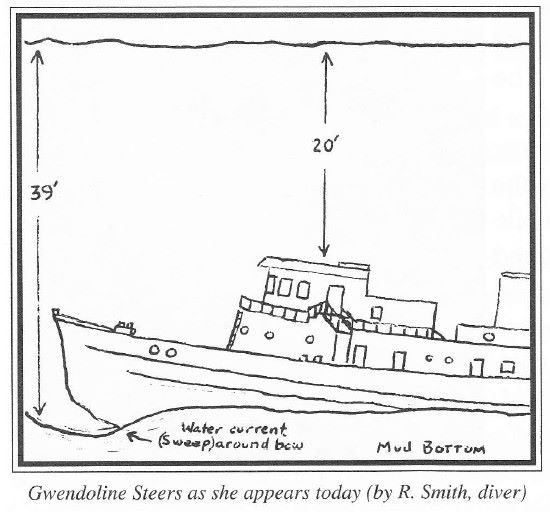
Current view of the Wreck

The wreck of the Gwendoline Steers lies in 38 feet of water at the mouth of Huntington Bay, NY between Eaton's Neck and Lloyd Neck on the north shore of Long Island. The distance is 20 feet from the top of the pilot house to the surface of the water at mean low water. A significant amount of hardware has been stripped from the vessel by recreational divers, but the structure of the vessel remains in excellent condition, however visibility at the wreck is lower than surrounding Long Island Sound wrecks. The wreck appears in a number of books detailing Long Island dive sites.

The wreck can be located at 40°57′15.31″N 73°26′2.78″W.

== Credits ==
This site was created from source material researched by Ed Carr, Tom Jordan, Steve Knox, and Adam Grohman. Photos were provided by Steve Knox, Henry Steers, John McKenna, Lori Barrus, Rich & Regina Ferrari, Gerard Thornton, and Allan Wyman. Additional information can be found at the Facebook page linked below.
