= French ironclad gunboat Flamme =

History

France
- Name: Flamme
- Ordered: 5 August 1882
- Builder: Arsenal de Cherbourg
- Laid down: 23 August 1882
- Launched: 29 August 1885
- Completed: June 1889
- Decommissioned: 25 June 1906
- Stricken: 9 April 1906
- Fate: Sold for scrap, 28 July 1906

General characteristics (as built)
- Class & type: Fusée-class ironclad gunboat
- Displacement: 1,128 t (1,110 long tons)
- Length: 50.66 m (166 ft 2 in) (o/a)
- Beam: 9.95 m (32 ft 8 in)
- Draft: 3.5 m (11 ft 6 in)
- Installed power: 3 cylindrical boilers; 1,500 ihp (1,100 kW)
- Propulsion: 2 propellers, 2 compound-expansion steam engines
- Speed: 12 knots (22 km/h; 14 mph)
- Range: 850 nmi (1,570 km; 980 mi) at 8 knots (15 km/h; 9.2 mph)
- Complement: 93
- Armament: 1 × single 24 cm (9.4 in) gun; 1 × single 90 mm (3.5 in) gun; 2 × 5-barrel 37 mm (1.5 in) revolver cannon
- Armor: Compound armor; Waterline belt: 160–270 mm (6.3–10.6 in); Barbette: 120–200 mm (4.7–7.9 in); Deck (ship): 20 mm (0.8 in)

Flamme was one of four Fusée-class ironclad gunboats built for the French Navy during the 1880s. Completed in 1889, she spent most of her career in reserve. The ship was sold for scrap in 1906.

== Bibliography ==
- Campbell, N. J. M. (1979). "The Netherlands". In Gardiner, Robert (ed.). Conway's All the World's Fighting Ships 1860–1905. Greenwich: Conway Maritime Press. pp. 371–377. ISBN 978-0-8317-0302-8.
- Roberts, Stephen S. (2021). French Warships in the Age of Steam 1859–1914: Design, Construction, Careers and Fates. Barnsley, UK: Seaforth Publishing. ISBN 978-1-5267-4533-0.
- Roche, Jean-Michel (2005). Dictionnaire des bâtiments de la flotte de guerre française de Colbert à nos jours [Dictionary of French Warships from Colbert to Today] (in French). Vol. Tome I: 1671–1870. Toulon: Roche. ISBN 978-2-9525917-0-6. OCLC 165892922.
