= French ironclad gunboat Cocyte =

History

France
- Name: Cocyte
- Ordered: 5 August 1882
- Builder: Arsenal de Cherbourg
- Laid down: 4 November 1882
- Launched: 13 January 1887
- Commissioned: July 1890
- Decommissioned: 3 October 1910
- Stricken: 9 March 1910
- Fate: Listed for sale, 1910–1911

General characteristics (as built)
- Class & type: Achéron-class ironclad gunboat
- Displacement: 1,721 t (1,694 long tons)
- Length: 55.6 m (182 ft 5 in) (o/a)
- Beam: 12.3 m (40 ft 4 in)
- Draft: 3.8 m (12 ft 6 in)
- Installed power: 4 locomotive boilers; 1,650 ihp (1,230 kW)
- Propulsion: 2 propellers, 2 compound-expansion steam engines
- Speed: 13 knots (24 km/h; 15 mph)
- Range: 1,800 nmi (3,300 km; 2,100 mi) at 8 knots (15 km/h; 9.2 mph)
- Complement: 99
- Armament: 1 × single 274 mm (10.8 in) gun; 3 × single 100 mm (3.9 in) guns; 2 × 47 mm (1.9 in) guns; 4 × 5-barrel 37 mm (1.5 in) revolver cannon
- Armor: Waterline belt: 200 mm (7.9 in); Turret: 200 mm (7.9 in); Barbette: 200 mm (7.9 in); Deck (ship): 20 mm (0.8 in)

Cocyte was one of four Achéron-class ironclad gunboats built for the French Navy during the 1880s. Completed in 1890, she spent most of her career in reserve. The ship was listed for sale in 1910–1911.

== Bibliography ==
- Campbell, N. J. M. (1979). "The Netherlands". In Gardiner, Robert (ed.). Conway's All the World's Fighting Ships 1860–1905. Greenwich: Conway Maritime Press. pp. 371–377. ISBN 978-0-8317-0302-8.
- Roberts, Stephen S. (2021). French Warships in the Age of Steam 1859–1914: Design, Construction, Careers and Fates. Barnsley, UK: Seaforth Publishing. ISBN 978-1-5267-4533-0.
- Roche, Jean-Michel (2005). Dictionnaire des bâtiments de la flotte de guerre française de Colbert à nos jours [Dictionary of French Warships from Colbert to Today] (in French). Vol. Tome I: 1671–1870. Toulon: Roche. ISBN 978-2-9525917-0-6. OCLC 165892922.
