= USS Vigilant (YT-25) =

Tugboat of the United States Navy

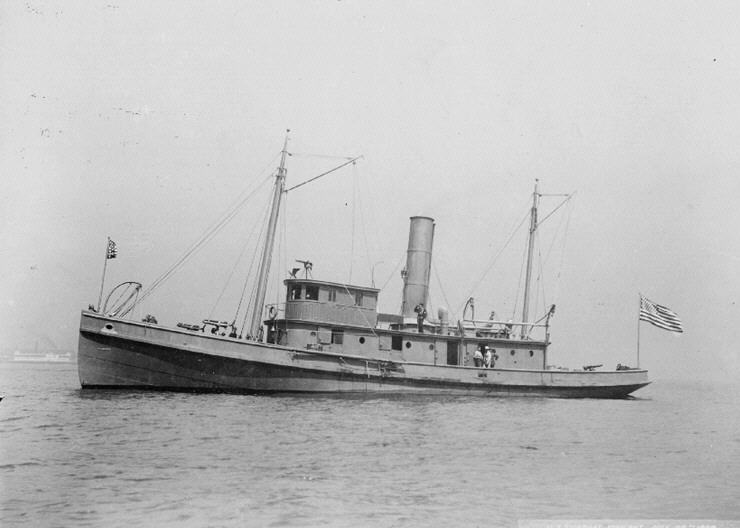
- USS Vigilant off Mare Island Navy Yard at Vallejo, California, on 26 July 1898.

History

United States
- Name: USS Vigilant
- Builder: William Cramp & Sons, Philadelphia
- Yard number: 232
- Laid down: 1881
- Completed: 1888
- Commissioned: 6 April 1898
- Reclassified: District harbor tug, YT-25, 17 July 1920
- Stricken: 26 November 1927
- Fate: Sold 25 April 1928

General characteristics
- Type: Armed tug
- Displacement: 300 tons
- Length: 116 ft (35 m)
- Beam: 21 ft (6.4 m)
- Draft: 9 ft (2.7 m) mean
- Propulsion: Steam engine, one shaft
- Speed: 12 knots (22 km/h; 14 mph)
- Complement: 46
- Armament: 2 × 1-pounder guns; 1 × machine gun

The second USS Vigilant (YT-25) was a United States Navy tug commissioned in 1898 and stricken in 1927. The vessel was constructed in 1881 at Philadelphia, Pennsylvania as George W. Pride and began service in San Francisco, California the same year. With the onset of the Spanish–American War, the tugboat was acquired by the United States Navy in April 1898 and remained in service until 1927.

== Service history ==
Vigilant was laid down in 1881 by William Cramp & Sons of Philadelphia, Pennsylvania and completed in 1888 as the iron-hulled commercial steam screw tug George W. Pride. Cramp delivered her to the John D. Spreckels Brothers' Company of San Francisco, California, that year.

The United States Navy acquired her from the John D. Spreckels Brothers' Company at the outset of the Spanish–American War in April 1898, and commissioned her as USS Vigilant on 6 April 1898. Vigilant was stationed in the San Francisco region from 1898 to 1927, operating either at the Yerba Buena Naval Station or the Naval Training Station, San Francisco.

On 12 December 1910 Vigilant had minor collisions with the ferry Berkeley off the Goat Island Lighthouse in San Francisco Bay and later in the day with steamer Vanguard off Pier 15 at San Francisco, with both incidents taking place in dense fog.

When the U.S. Navy instituted its modern hull number system on 17 July 1920, she was classified as a "district harbor tug" and designated YT-25. Vigilant's decommissioning date is uncertain. She was stricken from the Navy List on 26 November 1927 and sold to the Cary-Davis Tug and Barge Company of Seattle, Washington, on 25 April 1928.
