= Fusée-class ironclad gunboat =

Type of ironclad vessel

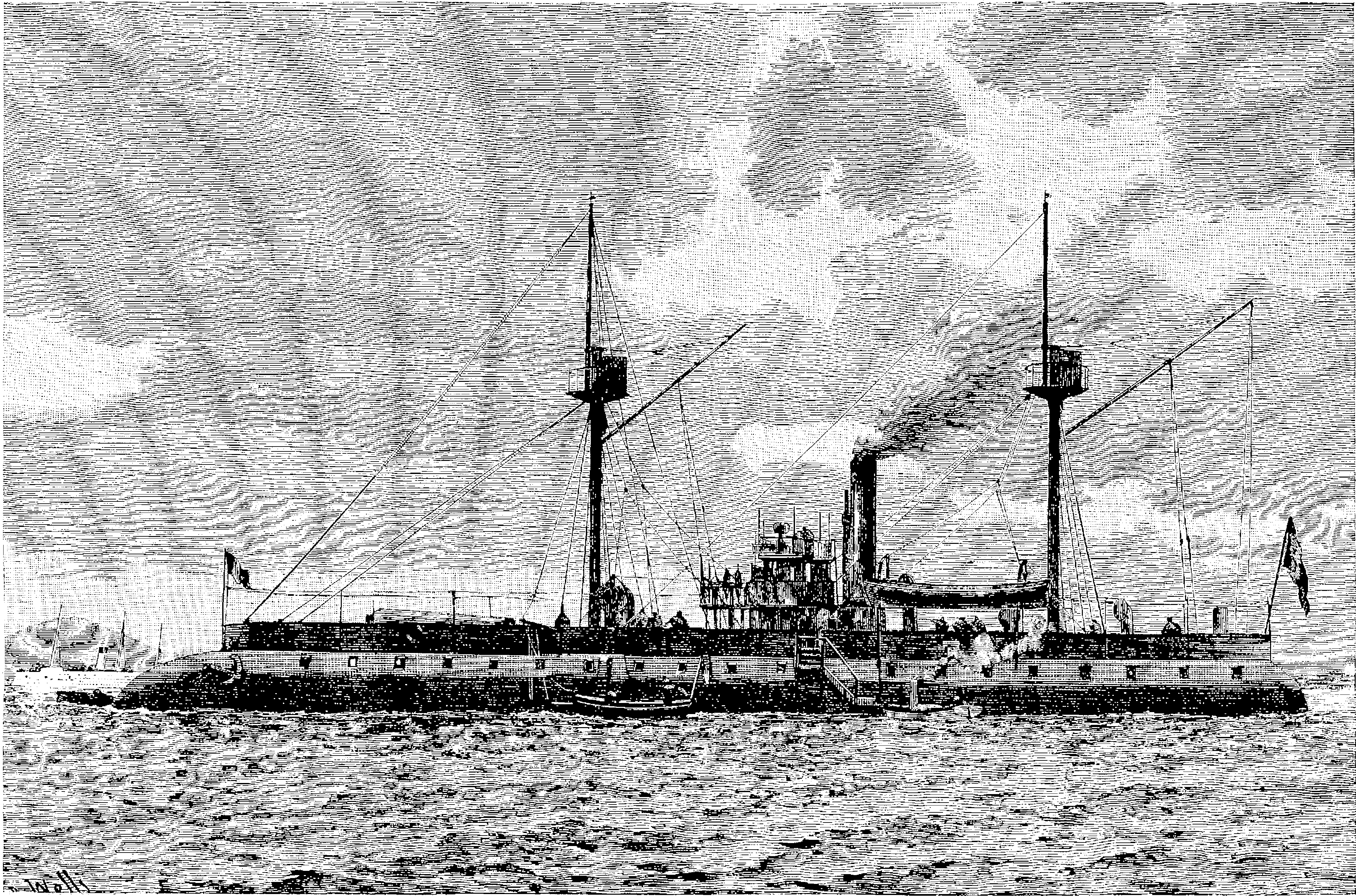

Class overview
- Name: Fusée class
- Operators: French Navy
- Preceded by: None
- Succeeded by: Achéron class
- Built: 1882–1889
- In service: 1888–1910
- Completed: 4
- Scrapped: 4

General characteristics (Fusée as built)
- Type: Ironclad gunboat
- Displacement: 1,128 t (1,110 long tons)
- Length: 50.66 m (166 ft 2 in) (o/a)
- Beam: 9.95 m (32 ft 8 in)
- Draft: 3.5 m (11 ft 6 in)
- Installed power: 3 cylindrical boilers; 1,500 ihp (1,100 kW)
- Propulsion: 2 propellers, 2 compound-expansion steam engines
- Speed: 12 knots (22 km/h; 14 mph)
- Range: 850 nmi (1,570 km; 980 mi) at 8 knots (15 km/h; 9.2 mph)
- Complement: 93
- Armament: 1 × single 24 cm (9.4 in) gun; 1 × single 90 mm (3.5 in) gun; 4 × 5-barrel 37 mm (1.5 in) revolver cannon; 1 × 356 mm (14 in) torpedo tube
- Armor: Waterline belt: 160–270 mm (6.3–10.6 in); Barbette: 120–200 mm (4.7–7.9 in); Deck (ship): 20 mm (0.8 in)

The Fusée-class consisted of four ironclad gunboats built for the French Navy in the 1880s. They spent the bulk of their careers in reserve.

== Ships ==
Construction data
Name	Laid down	Launched	Completed	Fate
Flamme	23 August 1882	28 August 1885	June 1889	Scrapped, 28 July 1906
Fusée	10 October 1882	8 May 1884	October 1887	Scrapped, 24 August 1912
Grenade	10 October 1882	18 October 1888	21 May 1889	Scrapped, 28 July 1906
Mitraille	16 April 1883	3 July 1886	8 April 1888	Scrapped, 24 August 1912

== Bibliography ==
- Campbell, N. J. M. (1979). "France". In Chesneau, Roger & Kolesnik, Eugene M. (eds.). Conway's All the World's Fighting Ships 1860–1905. Greenwich: Conway Maritime Press. pp. 283–333. ISBN 0-8317-0302-4.
- Roberts, Stephen S. (2021). French Warships in the Age of Steam 1859–1914: Design, Construction, Careers and Fates. Barnsley, UK: Seaforth Publishing. ISBN 978-1-5267-4533-0.
- Roche, Jean-Michel (2005). Dictionnaire des bâtiments de la flotte de guerre française de Colbert à nos jours [Dictionary of French Warships from Colbert to Today] (in French). Vol. Tome I: 1671–1870. Toulon: Roche. ISBN 978-2-9525917-0-6. OCLC 165892922.
