= John H. Dialogue =

American industrialist and shipbuilder

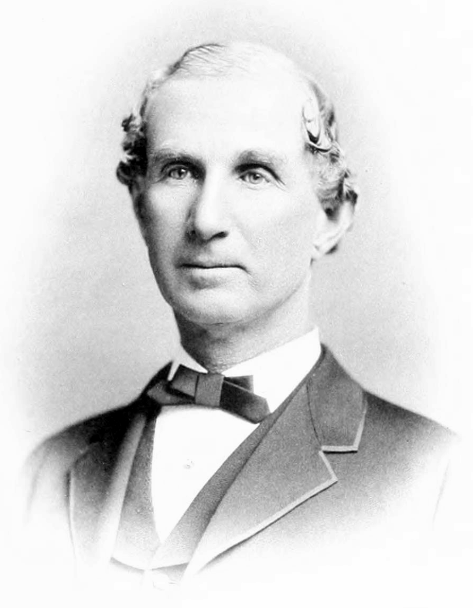
- Born: May 13, 1828; Philadelphia, Pennsylvania
- Died: October 23, 1898 (aged 70); Camden, New Jersey
- Education: Central High School, Philadelphia
- Spouse: Mary Easby (m. 1850; died 1882)
- Children: John Dialogue Jr., Adelaide, Stella, and Lillie
- Parent(s): Adam and Sallie Dialogue
- Engineering career
- Discipline: Shipbuilding
- Practice name: Dialogue & Company
- Projects: Constructed numerous tugboats and other craft for the U.S. Navy and the civilian market.

Signature
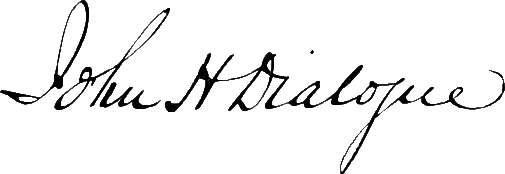

John H. Dialogue (1828–1898) was an American industrialist.

== Early life and family ==
John H. Dialogue was born in Philadelphia, Pennsylvania on May 13, 1828, to Adam and Sallie Dialogue. The family was of French-German ancestry. His father, Adam, was also an entrepreneur and inventor, and established himself as a manufacturer of riveted fire hose. Dialogue grew up in Philadelphia and was educated at Central High School, graduating in 1846. His uncle taught him machine work and drafting, and in 1850, Dialogue moved to Camden, New Jersey.

He married Mary Easby of Philadelphia in 1850, and they had four children: John Dialogue Jr., who eventually took over his father's shipbuilding works, and three daughters, Adelaide, Stella, and Lillie.

== Community efforts ==
In addition to his work in the industrial field, Dialogue remained involved in civic affairs. Despite being a Democrat, Dialogue ran unsuccessfully for New Jersey state senator from Camden in a voting district that was strongly Republican. He also served in a variety of community groups, such as serving on the Board of Education in 1875 and on the Camden city council in 1878, serving several terms and then becoming president of the council. In 1880 he was a presidential elector for the Hancock-English ticket and was later chosen as the president of the Electoral College of the State.

== Repairing locomotives ==
Dialogue started his enterprises in Camden by repairing locomotives for the Camden & Amboy Railroad Company, as well as working on Camden and Philadelphia and West Jersey Ferry Companies ferryboats, which were then common at the time at Camden, located on the Delaware River.

== Producing engines ==
In 1854, he purchased the Elias Kaighn foundry where his workers performed general machine work, as well as building Corliss stationary engines under a special license for the inventor. The Corliss engine was a new invention, and it greatly increased a steam engine's efficiency because of its innovative governor and valve design.

== Shipbuilding ==
He founded in 1862 the Camden National Iron Armor and Shipbuilding Company, which constructed small ships, but the company closed before the American Civil War ended. Dialogue then acted as subcontractor for Wilcox and Whiting, which took over the shipyard during the "weak" economic period from 1865 to 1870.

In 1870 he founded the River Iron Works, Dialogue & Wood, proprietors, which built iron ships. When Mr. Wood died, Dialogue became partner in the firm with his son, which then became known as John H. Dialogue & Son. This shipyard produced a large number of tugboats, both for civilian use and for the U.S. Navy. The shipyard was innovative, and was one of the first to adopt the compound marine engine and Scotch boiler. By the late 19th century, the Dialogue & Company shipyard was quite large and had the honor of doing reconstruction work on the famous USS Constitution.

== Suffering heart disease ==
After trying to restore his ailing heart by resting at his home at Atlantic City, Dialogue died October 23, 1898, and his son, John H. Dialogue Jr., took over the shipyard and continued work until just before World War I, when the younger Dialogue was forced into bankruptcy in late 1913. The property was purchased by the Reading Railroad, through hidden buyers, at less than half its appraised value, and the shipyard was demolished and was reconstructed into Reading's Camden terminal.

Mrs. Mary Dialogue died in 1882.

== See also ==
- Dialogue & Company
