= HMS Wasp =

Nine ships and one shore establishment of the Royal Navy have been named HMS Wasp, with one other government vessel using the name:

== Ships ==
- HMS Wasp (1749) was an 8-gun sloop launched in 1749. She was sold in 1781. In 1782 she became the mercantile Polly, and then in 1784 she became the slave ship Mentor. The French captured Mentor circa 1795.
- HMS Wasp (1782) was purchased on the stocks as a 14-gun sloop, converted to a fireship in 1798, and expended in July 1800 in the operation to capture the French frigate Désirée.
- Wasp was a gunboat at the Siege of Toulon (1793). She may have been a tartane that the French Navy had acquired at Toulon earlier that year.
- HMS Wasp (1794) was a 4-gun gunvessel purchased in 1794 from the Dutch. She was sold in 1802.
- HMS Wasp (1800) was originally the French 14-gun sloop Guepe, launched in 1798 and captured in 1800. The Navy sold her in 1811.
- HMS Wasp (1812) was an 18-gun Cruizer-class brig-sloop launched in 1812. She was broken up in 1847.
- HMS Wasp (1850) was an Archer-class wooden screw sloop launched in 1850. She was sold in 1869.
- HMS Wasp (1880) was a Banterer-class composite screw gunboat launched in 1880. She was wrecked in 1884 and finally sold in 1910.
- HMS Wasp (1886) was a Bramble-class composite screw gunboat launched in 1886. She foundered 1887 after leaving Singapore.

== Shore establishments ==
- HMS Wasp (shore establishment) was a Coastal Forces shore establishment at Dover during World War II

== Other vessels ==
- Torpedo Boat No. 191 was a second-class spar torpedo boat launched in 1883 by Thornycroft for Tasmanian service, arriving in Hobart on SS Abington on 1 May 1884. Called Wasp by her builders, she was referred to only by the number TB 1 when in service. She was transferred to South Australia in 1905, being towed behind Protector, and sold in 1917.
- Wasp was one of two schooners built at Calcutta for the Bengal Government in 1799. She served for three years in the Red Sea before being turned over to the government in Bombay. The other may have been Fury. They both supported General Baird's expedition to Egypt to help General Ralph Abercromby expel the French there.
