= List of shipwrecks in September 1887 =

The list of shipwrecks in September 1887 includes ships sunk, foundered, grounded, or otherwise lost during September 1887.

== 1 September ==
List of shipwrecks: 1 September 1887
Ship	State	Description
Alpas	United States	The steamship ran aground at Port-au-Prince, Haiti. She was on a voyage from New York to Port-au-Prince. She was refloated the next day.
Anna Dixon	United Kingdom	The schooner was abandoned in the North Sea off Texel, North Holland, Netherlands. She was on a voyage from Hamburg, Germany to Runcorn, Cheshire.
Unnamed	United Kingdom	The schooner ran aground on the Hook Sands, in the Bristol Channel.

== 2 September ==
List of shipwrecks: 2 September 1887
Ship	State	Description
Avenir	Norway	The brig ran aground on the Maplin Sands, in the North Sea off the coast of Essex, United Kingdom. She was refloated and taken in to Gravesend, Kent, United Kingdom in a leaky condition.
Falls of Bruar	United Kingdom	The full-rigged ship foundered in the North Sea 25 nautical miles (46 km) off Great Yarmouth, Norfolk with the loss of 24 of her 29 crew. Survivors were rescued by the smack Cygnet. Falls of Bruar was on a voyage from Hamburg, Germany to Calcutta, India.
Felice Queirolo	Italy	The barque foundered in the Atlantic Ocean (55°35′N 6°37′W). Her eleven crew were rescued by Kate Crosby (United States). Felice Queirolo was on a voyage from Antwerp, Belgium to Genoa.
Gylding	Denmark	The brig foundered in the North Sea 130 nautical miles (240 km) off Great Yarmouth. Her crew were rescued by the smack Vixen (United Kingdom). Gylding was on a voyage from Copenhagen to São Miguel Island, Azores.
Henry Holman	United Kingdom	The ship ran aground in the River Mersey at Ince, Cheshire and capsized. She subsequently broke up. She was on a voyage from the River Mersey to Plymouth, Devon.
John Adamson, and Salisbury	United Kingdom	The steamships collided at Antwerp, Belgium and were both severely damaged. John Adamson was on a voyage from Antwerp to South Shields, County Durham. Salisbury was on a voyage from Philadelphia, Pennsylvania, United States to Antwerp. She was beached. She was refloated the next day with the assistance of six tugs and taken in to Antwerp for repairs.
John Mann	Canada	The barque was abandoned in the Atlantic Ocean. Her crew were rescued by Nellie S. (Flag unknown). John Mann was on a voyage from Rotterdam, South Holland, Netherland to New York, United States.
Marianna	Italy	The ship collided with the steamship Bourgogne (France) and sank in the Mediterranean Sea off Oneglia. Her crew were rescued by Borgogne.
Rothbury	United Kingdom	The steamship was abandoned in the Bay of Biscay. Her seventeen crew were rescued by Ageroën (Flag unknown). Rothbury was on a voyage from Oran, Algeria to Dunkirk, Nord, France. Rothbury was subsequently anchored 4 nautical miles (7.4 km) off the Île de Sein, Finistère, France, and was later towed in to Brest, Finistère.
No 10	United Kingdom	The pilot cutter was driven ashore and wrecked at "Nawnan", Cornwall. Her crew were rescued.

== 3 September ==
List of shipwrecks: 3 September 1887
Ship	State	Description
Carl Rosenius	Norway	The brig ran aground on Taylor's Bank, in Liverpool Bay. She was on a voyage from Haugesund to Liverpool, Lancashire, United Kingdom. She was refloated and towed in to Liverpool by a tug.
Lillian Baxter	United States	The fishing schooner became waterlogged in a gale and was abandoned on the Georges Bank. Survivors were rescued by RMS Umbria (United Kingdom).
Livinia	United Kingdom	The barque was run into by a tug and severely damaged at Greenock, Renfrewshire.
Thomas L. Tarr	United States	The fishing schooner was believed to have sunk in a gale on the Georges Bank. Lost with all fourteen hands.

== 4 September ==
List of shipwrecks: 4 September 1887
Ship	State	Description
No. 5	United Kingdom	The pilot cutter was run into by the steamship Thomas Parker (United Kingdom) and sank in the English Channel 3 nautical miles (5.6 km) off Dungeness, Kent. Her crew were rescued.

== 5 September ==
List of shipwrecks: 5 September 1887
Ship	State	Description
Lilian Baxter	Flag unknown	The fishing smack was abandoned off the coast of the Newfoundland Colony. Her crew were rescued by the steamship Umbria (Flag unknown).
Orquell	Canada	The barque was abandoned in the Atlantic Ocean (48°26′N 17°31′W). Her crew were rescued by the steamship Endymion (United Kingdom). Orquell was on a voyage from Barrow-in-Furness, Lancashire, United Kingdom to New York, United States.
Queen Bee	United Kingdom	The cutter yacht sank off Kingstown, County Dublin with the loss of a crew member. She was being towed from Howth to Kingstown by the schooner Waterwitch (United Kingdom).

== 6 September ==
List of shipwrecks: 6 September 1887
Ship	State	Description
Monarch	(Canada)	The full-rigged ship was wrecked on Mindoro, Spanish East Indies. Her crew were rescued.

== 7 September ==
List of shipwrecks: 7 September 1887
Ship	State	Description
Hoffnung	Germany	The ship departed from the Clyde for Trinidad. No further trace, reported missing.
Juno	United Kingdom	The schooner ran aground on the North Bank, in Liverpool Bay. She was on a voyage from Runcorn, Cheshire to Bangor, Caernarfonshire. She was refloated and taken in to Hoylake, Cheshire in a severely leaky condition.

== 8 September ==
List of shipwrecks: 8 September 1887
Ship	State	Description
Caerloch	United Kingdom	The steamship was driven ashore at Sutton Bridge, Lincolnshire. She was on a voyage from "Remi" to Wisbech, Cambridgeshire. She was refloated and completed her voyage.
Constance	United Kingdom	The schooner collided with the steamship Mona's Isle ( (United Kingdom of Great Britain and Ireland) ) and sank at Liverpool, Lancashire. Her crew survived. Constance was on a voyage from Runcorn, Cheshire to Newcastle upon Tyne, Northumberland.
Maria	United Kingdom	The fishing schooner was lost on the Grand Banks of Newfoundland with the loss of fourteen of her crew.

== 9 September ==
List of shipwrecks: 9 September 1887
Ship	State	Description
Ellida	Germany	The ship caught fire at Cardiff, Glamorgan, United Kingdom and was severely damaged. She was scuttled.
Fairway	United Kingdom	The barque sprang a leak and was abandoned in the Atlantic Ocean. Her crew were rescued by the steamship Napoli (Italy). Fairway was on a voyage from Swansea, Glamorga to Buenos Aires, Argentina.
Hartfell	United Kingdom	The steamship collided with the steamship Topic (United Kingdom) at Barrow-in-Furnes, Lancashire and was severely damaged.

== 10 September ==
List of shipwrecks: 10 September 1887
Ship	State	Description
Gwalia	United Kingdom	The steamship ran aground at Cardiff, Glamorgan. She was refloated on 14 September and resumed her voyage.
HMS Wasp	Royal Navy	The Bramble-class gunboat departed from Singapore, Straits Settlements for Shanghai, China. No further trace, lost with all hands.

== 11 September ==
List of shipwrecks: 11 September 1887
Ship	State	Description
Aghios Dionisio	Greece	The brig was abandoned in the Mediterranean Sea off Pantellaria, Italy. Her crew were rescued by the steamship Dunedin (United Kingdom). Aghios Dionisio was on a voyage from Nice, Alpes-Maritimes, France to Taganrog, Russia.
Ossena	United Kingdom	The schooner foundered in the Irish Sea. Her six crew were rescued by another schooner. She was on a voyage from Runcorn, Cheshire to Belfast, County Antrim.
Terezina Stinga	Flag unknown	The barque was driven ashore and wrecked in Luce Bay. She was on a voyage from Leith, Lothian, United Kingdom to Buenos Aires, Argentina.

== 12 September ==
List of shipwrecks: 12 September 1887
Ship	State	Description
Gazellen	Norway	The ship was sighted off Dungeness, Kent, United Kingdom whilst on a voyage from Grangemouth, Stirlingshire, United Kingdom to Berbice, British Guiana. No further trace, reported missing.
Norah Creina	United Kingdom	The paddle steamer ran aground in the River Boyne. She was on a voyage from Drogheda, County Louth to Liverpool, Lancashire.

== 13 September ==
List of shipwrecks: 13 September 1887
Ship	State	Description
Mary Ann	Flag unknown	The ship was wrecked on the coast of Labrador, Newfoundland Colony.
Naomi	United Kingdom	The ship was wrecked on the coast of Labrador.

== 14 September ==
List of shipwrecks: 14 September 1887
Ship	State	Description
Edith and Annie	United Kingdom	The fishing lugger was wrecked on the Haisborough Sands, in the North Sea off the coast of Norfolk. Her crew were rescued by the fishing smack Laurel Wreath (United Kingdom).
Rene Isabelle	France	The schooner was holed by the anchor of the steamship St. André (France) and sank in the Bec d'Ambès.
Stanley	United Kingdom	The tug sank in the River Tyne at North Shields, Northumberland.

== 15 September ==
List of shipwrecks: 15 September 1887
Ship	State	Description
Prioress	United Kingdom	The steamship was driven ashore 50 nautical miles (93 km) north of "Cape St. Roque". She was refloated and put back to Macao in a leaky condition. She was consequently condemned.

== 16 September ==
List of shipwrecks: 16 September 1887
Ship	State	Description
English Girl	United Kingdom	The schooner ran aground at Morice Town, Devon.
Julie H.	United Kingdom	The ship was sighted off Holyhead, Anglesey whilst on a voyage from Birkenhead, Cheshire to Aspinwall, Colombia. No further trace, reported missing.

== 17 September ==
List of shipwrecks: 17 September 1887
Ship	State	Description
Perth	United Kingdom	The steamship ran aground off Point Cloates, Western Australia.

== 18 September ==
List of shipwrecks: 18 September 1887
Ship	State	Description
Alfred	United Kingdom	The schooner sprang a leak and foundered in the English Channel 6 nautical miles (11 km) off Brighton, Sussex. Her crew survived. She was on a voyage from Portmadoc, Caernarfonshire to London.
Friend of the Isles	United Kingdom	The ship struck floating timber and foundered in the English Channel 18 nautical miles (33 km) south south east of the Roches-Douvres Lighthouse, Côtes-du-Nord, France. Her crew were rescued by the cutter Risk ( (United Kingdom of Great Britain and Ireland) Jersey). Friend of the Isles was on a voyage from Penarth, Glamorgan to Saint-Brieuc, Côtes-du-Nord.
Vincenzo Perotta	Italy	The barque sprang a leak and was abandoned in the Atlantic Ocean. Her crew were rescued by the steamship Peconic (United Kingdom). Vincenzo Perotta was on a voyage from Portland, Maine, United States to Buenos Aires, Argentina.
Wave	United Kingdom	The brigantine foundered in the English Channel 4 nautical miles (7.4 km) west of Dungeness, Kent. Her crew survived. She was on a voyage from South Shields, County Durham to Caen, Calvados, France.

== 19 September ==
List of shipwrecks: 19 September 1887
Ship	State	Description
Alice	United Kingdom	The steamship departed from Riga, Russia for London. No further trace, reported missing.
Oxford	United Kingdom	The barque was driven ashore and wrecked on Luzon Island, Spanish East Indies in a typhoon with the loss of one of the 28 people on board. She was on a voyage from Manila to "ho-Ho", Spanish East Indies.

== 20 September ==
List of shipwrecks: 20 September 1887
Ship	State	Description
Anna	Netherlands	The schooner was abandoned in the North Sea 30 nautical miles (56 km) north east of Texel, North Holland. Her crew were rescued by the ketch Excellent (United Kingdom). Anna was on a voyage from Riga, Russia to "Dalziel". She subsequently came ashore on the Engelsmanplaat, Friesland and was wrecked.
Carrie W. Clarke	United States	The schooner was partly abandoned in the Atlantic Ocean. Nineteen of the 55 people on board were rescued by the barque Bravo (Norway); the rest refused to abandon ship.
Jennie	United Kingdom	The smack was discovered abandoned off the English and Welsh Grounds Lightship ( Trinity House) by the steam barge Enterprise (United Kingdom), which towed her in to Bristol, Gloucestershire.
Isle of Georgia	United Kingdom	The steamship ran aground. She was on a voyage from Newport, Monmouthshire to the Danube. She was refloated and resumed her voyage.
Lightwing	United States	The schooner was wrecked at Scituate, Massachusetts. Her crew were rescued.
Mona	United Kingdom	The pilot cutter was driven ashore and wrecked at Kilnsea, Yorkshire. Her crew were rescued by rocket apparatus.
No. 7	United Kingdom	The pilot cutter was driven ashore and wrecked at Kilnsea. Her crew were rescued by the Spurn Lifeboat.

== 21 September ==
List of shipwrecks: 21 September 1887
Ship	State	Description
Glanwern	United Kingdom	The steamship was driven ashore at "Cabezos", Spain. She was on a voyage from Alicante, Spain to Pomaron, Portugal. She was condemned and sold, but was later refloated.
Romeo	United Kingdom	The steamship ran ashore in the Seine near "Lavaquerie", Seine-Inférieure, France. She subsequently capsized with the loss of thirteen lives. Survivors were rescued by a tug.

== 23 September ==
List of shipwrecks: 23 September 1887
Ship	State	Description
Emmy Haase	United Kingdom	The steamship was sighted off Helsingør, Denmark whilst on a voyage from the River Tyne for Kronstadt, Russia. No further trace, reported missing.
Matthew Cay	United Kingdom	The steamship struck a sunken rock and foundered 2 1/2 nautical miles (4.6 km) off Cape Finisterre, Spain with the loss of ten of her nineteen crew. Survivors were rescued by Spanish fishermen. She was on a voyage from Troon, Ayrshire to Genoa, Italy.

== 24 September ==
List of shipwrecks: 24 September 1887
Ship	State	Description
Cecilie	Denmark	The steamship collided with the full-rigged ship New City (United Kingdom) and sank.
Patrie	France	The dandy was wrecked on the Longsand, in the North Sea off the coast of Essex, United Kingdom with the loss of seventeen of her twenty crew. Survivors were rescued by the paddle steamer India (United Kingdom).
Telephone	France	The fishing vessel was wrecked on the Longsand with the loss of fifteen of her twenty crew.

== 25 September ==
List of shipwrecks: 25 September 1887
Ship	State	Description
Violet	Flag unknown	The ship was wrecked on the coast of Labrador, Newfoundland Colony.

== 26 September ==
List of shipwrecks: 26 September 1887
Ship	State	Description
Gartmore	United Kingdom	The barque was driven ashore on the Mull of Galloway, Wigtownshire. She was on a voyage from Westport, County Mayo to Maryport, Cumberland. She was refloated and taken in to Greenock, Renfrewshire in a severely leaky condition.

== 27 September ==
List of shipwrecks: 27 September 1887
Ship	State	Description
Queen	United Kingdom	The steamship caught fire at Liverpool, Lancashire.

== 28 September ==
List of shipwrecks: 28 September 1887
Ship	State	Description
Edmond	United Kingdom	The dredger/hopper barge sprang a leak and was abandoned off Ouessant, Finistère, France (46°39′N 6°34′W). Her six crew were rescued by the tug Power (United Kingdom). Edmond was being towed by Power from Dover, Kent to Porto, Portugal.

== 29 September ==
List of shipwrecks: 29 September 1887
Ship	State	Description
Earl of Jersey	United Kingdom	The full-rigged ship ran aground in the Chittagong River, India, and was declared a total loss.
Jane and Louise	United Kingdom	The Thames barge collided with the steamship Wapping (United Kingdom) and sank in the River Thames at North Woolwich, Middlesex.
Sweet Home	Flag unknown	The ship was wrecked on the coast of Labrador, Newfoundland Colony.

== 30 September ==
List of shipwrecks: 30 September 1887
Ship	State	Description
Diadem	United Kingdom	The steamship ran aground in the Dardanelles. She was on a voyage from Naples, Italy to Odesa, Russia. She was refloated with the assistance of a tug.

== Unknown date ==
List of shipwrecks: Unknown date in September 1887
Ship	State	Description
Alberta	United Kingdom	The Thames barge was run into by the steamship Falcon and sank in the River Thames near Belvedere, Kent. Her crew survived.
Amsterdam	Netherlands	The steamship ran aground at Blankenese, Germany. She was on a voyage from Hamburg, Germany to Rotterdam, South Holland.
Andreta	United Kingdom	The full-rigged ship was driven ashore at "Schardynkil", Zeeland, Netherlands. She was on a voyage from Antwerp, Belgium to Gothenburg, Sweden. She was refloated and resumed her voyage.
Ann Peebles	United Kingdom	The fishing boat was driven ashore near the mouth of the River Don. All twelve people on board were rescued by the Aberdeen Lifeboat. She was on a voyage from Peterhead, Aberdeenshire to Pittenweem, Fife.
Aracan	Sweden	The barque ran aground in the Torres Strait. She was refloated and taken in to Brisbane, Queensland.
Argo	Netherlands	The schooner was driven ashore on Læsø, Denmark. She was on a voyage from Hamburg to .Saint Petersburg, Russia. She was refloated and put in to Fredrikshavn, Denmark.
Bella	United Kingdom	The smack was wrecked on the Cannon Rock, off the coast of County Down. Her crew were rescued.
Benjamin	Russia	The schooner collided with the barque Max August (Russia) off Helsingør Denmark and was severely damaged. Benjamin was on a voyage from Charlestown, Cornwall, United Kingdom to Riga. She was towed in to Helsingør.
Bhundara	United Kingdom	The steamship ran aground on the Twobaga Reefs, in the Sunda Strait. She was refloated and put in to Batavia, Netherlands East Indies in a leaky condition.
Billy Simpson	United Kingdom	The barque was abandoned at sea. Her crew were rescued.
Busy Bee	United Kingdom	The ship collided with the brig Heroen (Norway) and was severely damaged. She put in to Havre de Grâce, Seine-Inférieure, France.
Cambois	Flag unknown	The ship was driven ashore at Visby, Gotland, Sweden.
Cataluna	Spain	The ssteamship was wrecked in the Bahamas. Her crew were rescued. She was on a voyage from Havana, Cuba to New York, United States.
Chandernagor	United Kingdom	The barque was lost off the Rocas Atoll, Brazil. Her crew were rescued by the steamship Gequia (Brazil). Chandernagor was on a voyage from Macau to Rio de Janeiro, Brazil.
Eliza	Norway	The barque was wrecked on the St. Nicholas Rock, at the mouth of the Gironde. Her eight crew were rescued. She was on a voyage from the Gironde to Stavanger.
Emiline	United Kingdom	The brigantine capsized in the Atlantic Ocean.
Fairway	United Kingdom	The barque was abandoned in the Atlantic Ocean. She was on a voyage from Swansea, Glamorgan to Buenos Aires, Argentina.
Flamingo	United Kingdom	The steamship ran aground at Lühe, Germany. She was on a voyage from Hamburg to Hull, Yorkshire.
Fortuna	Norway	The schooner was abandoned in the North Sea. Her crew were rescued by Ceres (Flag unknown). Fortuna was on a voyage from Charlestown, Fife to Lymington, Hampshire, United Kingdom.
Foxhall	United Kingdom	The steamship ran aground on the Corn Island Reef.
Fremad	Norway	The brig was driven ashore at Thisted, Denmark. She was on a voyage from Hull to Tvedestrand. She was a total loss.
Fromore	United Kingdom	The steamship ran aground in the Danube 18 nautical miles (33 km) from its mouth.
Galatz	United Kingdom	The steamship was damaged by fire at Gibraltar.
Great Yarmouth	United Kingdom	The ship was driven ashore on Skalskar (?), Åland, Grand Duchy of Finland.
Hardi	Norway	The schooner was driven ashore and wrecked at "Furon", near Oskarshamn, Sweden.
Hermann	Belgium	The steamship collided with the steamship Nubis (United Kingdom) at Antwerp and was severely damaged.
Hjalmar	Norway	The barque ran aground on Saltholm, Denmark. She was on a voyage from Neder Kalix, Sweden to Calais, France. She was later refloated and towed in to Copenhagen, Denmark.
Hope	United Kingdom	The ship caught fire and was abandoned at sea. She was on a voyage from Rio de Janeiro to "Brunswick".
Johanne Ruff	Denmark	The ship was driven ashore at Søndervig. Her crew were rescued.
John and Albert	Portugal	The steamship struck a sunken rock in the Douro and was beached. he was on a voyage from Antwerp to Porto.
Kelvinside	United Kingdom	The ship was driven ashore and wrecked on Mauritius.
Kottingham	United Kingdom	The steamship ran aground at Saltholm, Denmark. She was on a voyage from Sundsvall, Sweden to London. She was refloated and resumed her voyage.
Lennox	United Kingdom	The steamship ran aground at Waterloo, Lancashire and broke in two. Her crew were rescued. She was on a voyage from Liverpool, Lancashire to Singapore.
Liberto	Argentina	The ship was destroyed by fire at Buenos Aires.
Lilian	(United Kingdom of Great Britain and Ireland) Jersey	The schooner was driven ashore at Figueira da Foz, Portugal. Her crew were rescued. She was on a voyage from Saint John's, Newfoundland Colony to Figueir da Foz.
Lizzie Ann	United Kingdom	The smack was abandoned off Strumble Head, Pembrokeshire. She was towed in to Fishguard, Pembrokeshire on 17 September.
Llanelly	United Kingdom	The steamship was driven ashore at Llanelly, Glamorgan. She was refloated on 13 September.
Maglona	United Kingdom	The schooner was driven ashore at French Mistaken Point, Newfoundland Colony. Her crew were rescued. She was on a voyage from Placentia Bay, Newfoundland Colony to Gibraltar. She was a total loss.
Manhega	New South Wales	The barque was wrecked at Hondeklip Bay, Cape Colony. Her crew were rescued. She was on a voyage from Hong Kong to New York.
Margaret Elizabeth	United Kingdom	The schooner was driven ashore west of Rhyl, Denbighshire.
Maronysa	Russia	The tanker ran aground in the Danube upstream of Giurgevo, Romania. She was on a voyage from Rostov-on-Don to Cladova, Romania.
Mary Blundell	United Kingdom	The barque caught fire at Melbourne, Victoria and was scuttled. She was later refloated.
Maurins	United Kingdom	The steamship ran aground at "Dognasian", Ottoman Empire. She was on a voyage from Odesa, Russia to Hull. She was refloated on 21 September.
Medina	United Kingdom	The ketch was abandoned in the English Channel off the coast of Sussex. She was subsequently boarded by the Coastguard and beached at Selsey, Sussex.
Middlesbrough	United Kingdom	The steamship was driven ashore. She was later refloated and towed in to Brăila, Romania.
Milo	Flag unknown	The ship was driven ashore at Bahia Blanca, Brazil. She was consequently condemned.
Nervion	Spain	The steamship foundered in the Bay of Biscay. Her crew were rescued by the steamship Caffaro (Italy. Nervion was on a voyage from Newcastle upon Tyne, Northumberland, United Kingdom to Bilbao.
Niagara	United States	The schooner foundered in Lake Superior 5 nautical miles (9.3 km) off Whitefish Point, Michigan before 9 September with the loss of fifteen lives.
Niederhoff	Germany	The schooner was driven ashore at Taiwanfoo, Formosa. She was a total loss.
Nomaden	Norway	The brig ran aground on the Dracko Sand Reef, in the Baltic Sea. She was refloated.
Nuovo San Catella	Italy	The brig caught fire at Montevideo, Uruguay.
Odessyes	Greece	The lighter was run into by the gunboat Penderekli (Imperial Russian Navy) in the Danube 18 nautical miles (33 km) from its mouth. She was severely damaged.
Olympias	United Kingdom	The steamship ran aground at Middlesbrough, Yorkshire. She was on a voyage from Middlesbrough to Bombay, India. She was later refloated and resumed her voyage.
Oxford	United Kingdom	The full-rigged ship was lost in a typhoon near Ioliol, Spanish East Indies.
Panama	France	The steamship was driven ashore at Matane, Quebec, Canada. She was on a voyage from Barrow-in-Furness, Lancashire, United Kingdom to Quebec City, Canada. She was refloated with the assistance of a tug and resumed her voyage.
Parthia	Canada	The ship was abandoned in the Atlantic Ocean. Her crew were rescued by the steamship Haverstoe (United Kingdom). Parthia was on a voyage from London to New York.
Petrel	United Kingdom	The yacht was driven ashore and damaged at Camden Point, County Cork.
Pheasant	United Kingdom	The steamship ran aground on the Packin Rock. She was refloated on 14 September.
Ragusa	United Kingdom	The steamship collided with the Rhine barge Varsehung (Germany) at Antwerp and was beached. Ragusa was on a voyage from Galaţi, Romania to Antwerp.
Retreiver	United Kingdom	The ship sank at Demerara, British Guiana.
Right of Way	United Kingdom	The schooner was driven ashore and wrecked at "St. Combie", Aberdeenshire. She was on a voyage from Sunderland, County Durham to Lossiemouth, Lothia.
Romeo	United Kingdom	The steamer grounded and capsized near Rouen. Seven passengers and six Scandinavian sailors drowned; the remaining crew were rescued by a tug.
Rosedale	United Kingdom	The ship caught fire at Port-au-Prince, Haiti and was scuttled. She was on a voyage from Garston, Lancashire to Port-au-Prince.
Saga	United Kingdom	The steamship ran aground at Quebec City. She was on a voyage from Quebec City to Leith, Lothian.
Samuel D. Baker	United States	The ship caught fire at sea. The fire was extinguished.
Sara	United Kingdom	The steamship was driven ashore. She was on a voyage from Riga to Liverpool. She was later refloated and towed in to Malmö, Sweden.
Satellite	United Kingdom	The cutter was wrecked at Guernsey, Channel Islands.
Septimus	United Kingdom	The barque ran aground on the Calshot Spit, in the Solent. She was on a voyage from Southampton, Hampshire to Plymouth, Devon.
Sokoto	United Kingdom	The ship was driven ashore at Garvel Point, Ayrshire. She was refloated on 10 September.
Star of the West	United Kingdom	The fishing boat was run into by the fishing boat Intrinsic (United Kingdom) and sank in the North Sea off the coast of Fife. Her crew were rescued.
St. Bernard	Norway	The schooner was severely damaged during the launch of a steamship at Bergen. She was beached.
Suez	Sweden	The barque was driven ashore on Anticosti Island, Nova Scotia, Canada.
Svea	Norway	The barque was abandoned in the North Sea. She was towed in to Cuxhaven, Germany in a waterlogged condition by the steamship Pelican (United Kingdom).
Sybilla	Germany	The lighter was driven ashore near Köln, Germany.
Thirza	Norway	The barque was destroyed by fire at sea. Her crew were rescued by Marie Kuiper (Flag unknown). Thirza was on a voyage from Glasgow, Renfrewshire, United Kingdom to the Cape of Good Hope, Cape Colony.
Thomas Scarr	United Kingdom	The ship struck the Hale Sand, off the mouth of the Humber and was damaged. She was on a voyage from Hull to Colchester, Essex. She was refloated and resumed her voyage, but put in to Brightlingsea, Essex in a leaky condition on 9 September.
Titania	Norway	The barque was run into by the steamship Duchess (United Kingdom) at "Draks", Denmark and was severely damaged. Titania was on a voyage from Sundsvall, Sweden to Dundee, Forfarshire, United Kingdom. She was towed in to Copenhagen by Duchess.
Tre Sostre	Denmark	The schooner ran aground at "Dracho". She was on a voyage from Saint Petersburg to Aarhus.
Umberto Primo	Italy	The steamship was driven ashore on Ventotene. Her passengers were rescued. She was on a voyage from Genoa to Naples.
Vernon	United Kingdom	The steamship ran aground at Lühe. She was on a voyage from Hamburg to Sunderland.
Warkworth	United Kingdom	The steamship was driven ashore at Terneuzen, Zeelan. She was on a voyage from Newcastle upon Tyne to Antwerp. She was refloated with assistance.
West Cumberland	United Kingdom	The steamship was driven ashore on "Coudres Island", Quebec. She was on a voyage from Montreal, Quebec to Pictou, Nova Scotia. She was refloated and put in to Quebec City in a leaky condition and was placed under repair.
Wilhelmine	Sweden	The brig was driven ashore at "Furon".
Unnamed	United Kingdom	The barge was run into by the steamship Avocet (United Kingdom and sank at Greenwich, Kent. Her crew were rescued by Avocet.
Unnamed	Flag unknown	The ship foundered in the English Channel with the loss of all on board, about 50 lives. Witnessed by the fishing smack 655 (France).
Unnamed	Flag unknown	The barque caught fire and was abandoned in the North Sea on or before 12 September.
