= SS Killarney =

SS Killarney is the name of the following ships:

- SS Killarney (1856), built for Sligo Steam Navigation Company, ran aground 20 September 1884
- SS Killarney (1893), served during evacuation of Dunkirk, ran aground during a storm in 1951
- SS Killarney (1919), built by A. & J. Inglis, renamed Lairdsmoor in 1929, sank in a collision on 7 April 1937

== See also ==
- Killarney (disambiguation)
- USS Killarney
- Killarney (barque), a barque sunk by SM U-21 on 8 May 1917
