= Albacore-class gunboat (1883) =

British gunboat class

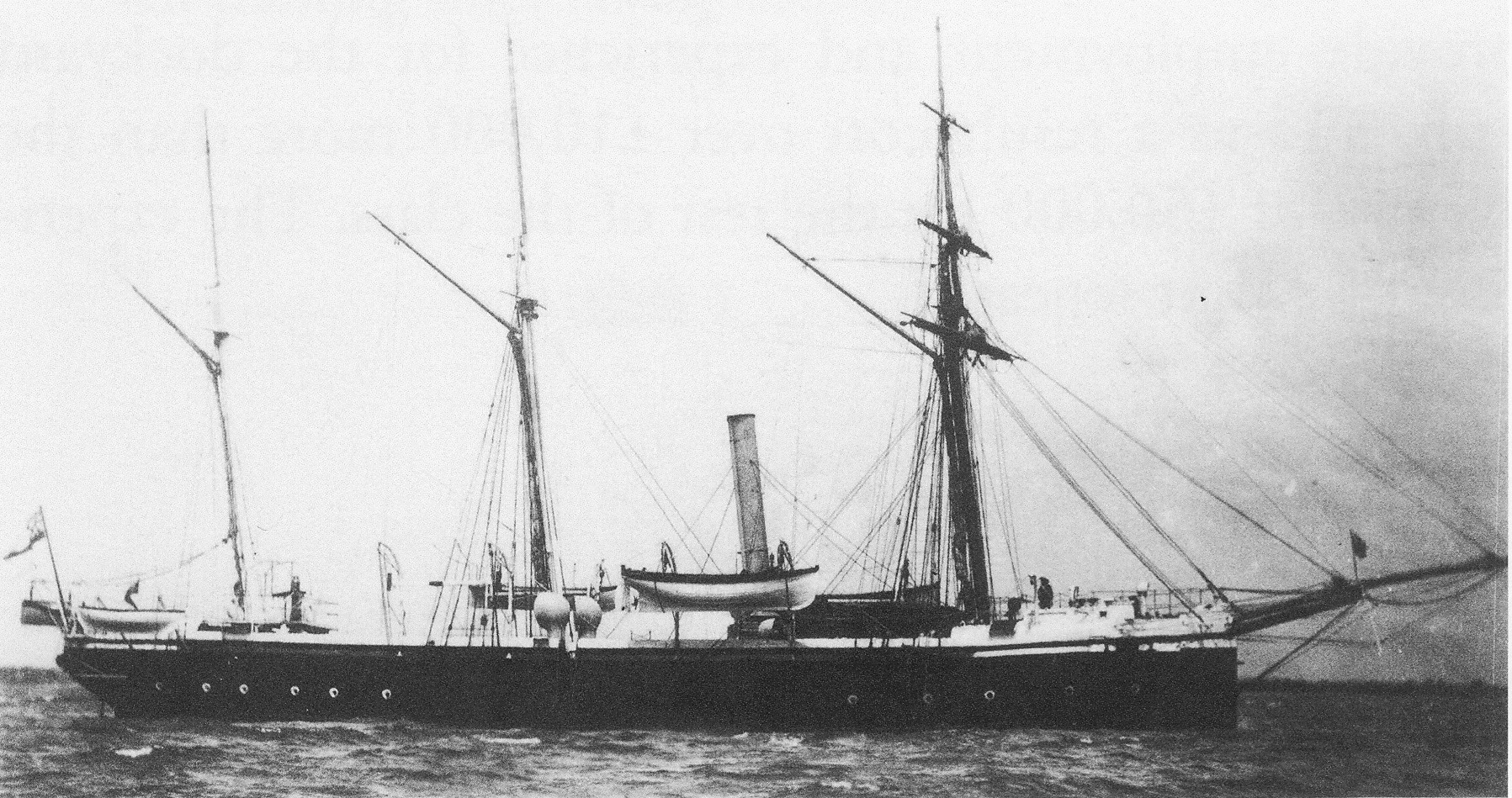
- HMS Watchful

Class overview
- Name: Albacore class
- Builders: Laird Brothers, Birkenhead
- Operators: Royal Navy
- Preceded by: Banterer class
- Succeeded by: Bramble class
- Built: 1883
- In commission: 1884–1907
- Completed: 3
- Retired: 3

General characteristics
- Type: Composite screw gunboat
- Displacement: 560 tons standard
- Length: 135 ft 0 in (41.1 m) pp
- Beam: 26 ft 6 in (8.1 m)
- Draught: 10 ft 3 in (3.1 m)
- Depth of hold: 11 ft 6 in (3.5 m)
- Installed power: 650 ihp (480 kW)
- Propulsion: 2-cylinder compound-expansion steam engine; Single screw
- Speed: 10.7 kn (19.8 km/h)
- Crew: 60
- Armament: 2 × 5-inch/50-pdr (38cwt) breech-loading guns (Note: Watchful received the 40cwt Mk III version of the same gun.); 2 × 4-inch/20-pdr breech-loading guns; 2 × machine guns

The Albacore-class gunboat was a class of three gunboats built for the Royal Navy in 1883. The name had already been used for a class of 98 gunboats built during the Great Armament of the Crimean War.

== Design ==
The Albacore class was designed by Nathaniel Barnaby, the Admiralty Director of Naval Construction. The ships were of composite construction, meaning that the iron keel, frames, stem and stern posts were of iron, while the hull was planked with timber. This had the advantage of allowing the vessels to be coppered, thus keeping marine growth under control, a problem that caused iron-hulled ships to be frequently docked. They were 135 feet (41 m) in length and displaced 560 tons. They were a slightly larger version of the Forester and Banterer classes that preceded them. They pioneered the use of modern breech-loading guns as the main armament, but were the last gunboats to mount their weapons on traversing mountings.

=== Propulsion ===
Two-cylinder compound-expansion steam engines built by the builder, Laird Brothers of Birkenhead, provided 650 indicated horsepower through a single screw, sufficient for 10.7 knots (19.8 km/h; 12.3 mph).

=== Armament ===
Ships of the class were armed with two 5-inch/50-pdr (38cwt) breech-loading guns and two 4-inch/20-pdr breech-loading guns. A pair of machine guns was also fitted.

== Ships ==
Name	Ship builder	Launched	Fate
Albacore	Laird Brothers, Birkenhead	13 January 1883	Sold on 18 May 1906.
Mistletoe	Laird Brothers, Birkenhead	7 February 1883	Boom defence in 1903. Sold to Shipbreaking Company, London on 14 May 1907.
Watchful	Laird Brothers, Birkenhead	13 February 1883	Boom defence in 1903. Sold to Shipbreaking Company, London on 14 May 1907.
