= HMS Raven (1882) =

Gunboat of the Royal Navy

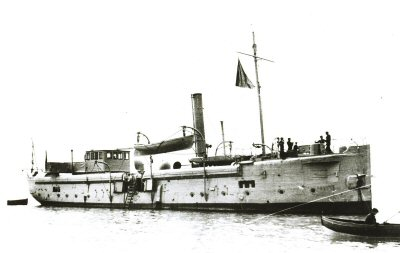
- HMS Raven as a diving tender c.1910

History

United Kingdom
- Name: HMS Raven
- Ordered: 1880
- Builder: Samuda Brothers, Poplar
- Cost: Hull: £14,800; Machinery: £6,250
- Launched: 18 May 1882
- Commissioned: April 1883
- Fate: Sold March 1925

General characteristics
- Class & type: Banterer-class gunboat
- Displacement: 465 tons
- Length: 125 ft (38.1 m) pp
- Beam: 23 ft 6 in (7.2 m)
- Draught: 10 ft (3.0 m)
- Installed power: 380 ihp (280 kW)
- Propulsion: 2-cylinder horizontal compound-expansion steam engine; Single screw
- Sail plan: Barquentine
- Speed: 9 1/2 knots (17.6 km/h; 10.9 mph)
- Range: 40 tons coal
- Complement: 60
- Armament: 2 × 6-inch/64-pdr (56 cwt) muzzle-loading rifles; 2 × 4-inch/20 pdr BL guns; 2 × machine guns

HMS Raven was a Banterer-class gunboat of the Royal Navy, built by Samuda Brothers of Poplar, London, and launched on 18 May 1882. She served on the Australia Station and was converted to a diving tender in 1904. After being lent as a training ship in 1913 she was sold for breaking in 1925.

== Design ==
The Banterer class was designed by Nathaniel Barnaby, the Admiralty Director of Naval Construction. They were of composite construction, meaning that the frame, keel and sternpost were of iron, while the hull was planked with timber. This had the advantage of allowing the vessels to be coppered, thus keeping marine growth under control, a problem that caused iron-hulled ships to be frequently docked. They were 125 feet (38 m) in length and displaced 465 tons. In appearance they were distinguishable from the preceding Foresters (also a Barnaby design) by their vertical stems.

=== Propulsion ===
A two-cylinder horizontal compound-expansion steam engine by J & G Rennie provided 380 indicated horsepower (280 kW) through a single screw, sufficient to drive Raven at 9.5 knots (17.6 km/h; 10.9 mph). The initial cost of the machinery was £6,250.

=== Armament ===
Ships of the class were armed with two 6-inch 64-pounder muzzle-loading rifles (a conversion of the smoothbore 32-pounder 58 cwt gun) and two 4-inch 20-pounder breech loading guns. A pair of machine guns were also fitted.

== Construction ==
Raven was ordered from Samuda Brothers in 1880 and launched from their Poplar yard on 18 May 1882. The cost of building the hull was £14,800, while fitting out was conducted by the naval dockyard at Sheerness. She was rigged with three masts, and photographs of sister ships show a square rig on the foremast only, making them barquentine-rigged vessels.

== Service history ==
Raven commissioned at Sheerness for the first time on 25 April 1883 and commenced service on the Australia Station. She left the Australia Station in October 1890. On 26 June 1897 she was present at the Naval Review at Spithead in celebration of the Diamond Jubilee. She served at the Channel Islands under Commander E. J. Rein, and was paid off at Chatham 26 November 1901, when her crew was transferred to HMS Albacore which then replaced her at the Channel Islands. She was converted to a diving tender in 1904 and was lent as a training ship in March 1913.

== Fate ==
A Banterer-class gunboat photographed as built

Raven was sold for breaking on 13 March 1925.
