= List of shipwrecks in September 1884 =

The list of shipwrecks in September 1884 includes ships sunk, foundered, grounded, or otherwise lost during September 1884.

== 3 September ==
List of shipwrecks: 3 September 1884
Ship	State	Description
Carrie	United Kingdom	The steamship struck the Pearl Rock, off Gibraltar and foundered.
Greyhound	United Kingdom	The fishing smack was run down and sunk in the Thames Estuary with the loss of all three crew. She was on a voyage from Whitstable, Kent for Brightlingsea, Essex.
SMS Sophie	Imperial German Navy	The Carola-class corvette collided with the steamship Hohenstaufen off Wangeroog and was severely damaged. SMS Sophie put in to Wilhelmshaven.

== 4 September ==
List of shipwrecks: 4 September 1884
Ship	State	Description
Beatrice	United Kingdom	The ship was driven ashore and wrecked at Varignano, Italy. Her crew were rescued.
Expert	United Kingdom	The schooner ran aground on the Middle Sand, in the North Sea off the coast of Essex. She floated off and sank. All seven people on board were rescued by the steamship Wynyard Park (United Kingdom). Expect was on a voyage from South Shields, County Durham to Whitstable, Kent.
Louie	United Kingdom	The yacht ran aground off Blankenberge, West Flanders, Belgium with the loss of three of the six people on board. She was on a voyage from Ostend, West Flanders to London.

== 5 September ==
List of shipwrecks: 5 September 1884
Ship	State	Description
Agricola	United Kingdom	The schooner was driven ashore on Rutland Island, County Donegal. She was on a voyage from Ayr to Sligo.
Chase	United Kingdom	The ship departed from Cardiff, Glamorgan for Passage East, County Waterford. No further trace, reported overdue.
Douglas	United Kingdom	The barge was wrecked on a sandbank off the coast of Somme, France. She was on a voyage from London to Honfleur, Manche, France.
Socrates	Norway	The barque was driven ashore at Egmond aan Zee, North Holland, Netherlands. Her crew were rescued. She was on a voyage from Zaandam, North Holland to Hudiksvall, Sweden.

== 7 September ==
List of shipwrecks: 7 September 1884
Ship	State	Description
Ellen	United Kingdom	The smack foundered off Cardigan. Three people were rescued by the lifeboat Lizzie & Charles Leigh Clare ( Royal National Lifeboat Institution).
Gloucester Packet	United Kingdom	The smack was driven ashore and wrecked at Newport, Pembrokeshire. Her crew were rescued.
Hermit	(United Kingdom of Great Britain and Ireland) Isle of Man	The yacht was driven ashore and severely damaged at Port Erin.
Mystery	United Kingdom	The ship ran aground on the Gunfleet Sand, in the North Sea off the coast of Essex. She was refloated with assistance from the Harwich Lifeboat Albert Edward ( Royal National Lifeboat Institution). Mystery was on a voyage from Calais, France to Southampton, Hampshire. She was refloated and take in to Harwich, Essex in a leaky condition.
Unda	Norway	The brigantine foundered off Cardigan. Her six crew were rescued by the lifeboat Lizzie & Charles Leigh Clare ( Royal National Lifeboat Institution).

== 8 September ==
List of shipwrecks: 8 September 1884
Ship	State	Description
Cheerful	United Kingdom	The steamship was run into by the steamship Clydach (France) at Falmouth, Cornwall and was beached. All on board were rescued.
Margaret and Peggy	United Kingdom	The ship was wrecked at Peel, Isle of Man.

== 9 September ==
List of shipwrecks: 9 September 1884
Ship	State	Description
Alice	Germany	The steamship foundered in the Drogden with the loss of her captain. Survivors were rescued by the steamship Hoselaw (United Kingdom). Alice was on a voyage from Middlesbrough, Yorkshire, United Kingdom to Stettin.
Cornwall	United Kingdom	The steamship was run into by Stanmore (United Kingdom) off Scarborough, Yorkshire and was severely damaged. Cornwall was on a voyage from London to the River Wear. She was assisted in to the River Wear by Rescue (United Kingdom) and other tugs. She consequently sank at Sunderland, County Durham.
Fenella	(United Kingdom of Great Britain and Ireland) Isle of Man	Fenella aground The steamship struck a rock in the Menai Strait, grounded, refloated, collided with Prince Arthur (Flag unknown), then grounded again near the Menai Bridge without loss of life. She was refloated, repaired, and returned to service.
Quartette	United Kingdom	The fishing vessel was driven ashore and wrecked 3 nautical miles (5.6 km) south of Scarborough. Her crew survived.
Two Brothers	United Kingdom	The Thames Barge was run into by the steamboat Duke of Connaught (United Kingdom) and sank in the River Thames upstream of Blackfriars Bridge, London.
Vril	United Kingdom	The yacht struck a submerged rock in Blackfarland Bay and sank.

== 10 September ==
List of shipwrecks: 10 September 1884
Ship	State	Description
Border Maid	United Kingdom	The keelboat was driven on to the Boulmer South Rocks, on the coast of Northumberland.
Unnamed	Austria-Hungary	The tug sank in the Danube at Mannsdorf an der Donau with the loss of five of her eight crew.

== 11 September ==
List of shipwrecks: 11 September 1884
Ship	State	Description
Dalbeattie, and Harvest Queen	United Kingdom	The ships collided off Filey, Yorkshire and were both severely damaged. Dalbeattie put in to Middlesbrough, Yorkshire waterlogged at the bow.
RMS Dart	United Kingdom	The steamship sank at San Sebastián, to the north of Santos, Brazil with the loss of one life. She was on a voyage from Southampton, Hampshire to Brazilian ports.
Ecureuil	United Kingdom	The fishing smack was wrecked on the coast of Iceland. Her crew survived.
Elm	United Kingdom	The steamship was driven ashore on Rathlin Island, County Donegal. She was on a voyage from Glasgow, Renfrewshire to Westport, County Mayo. She was refloated.
John Thompson	United Kingdom	The brigantine was wrecked in the Rio Grande. Her crew were rescued. She was on a voyage from Newport, Monmouthshire to the Rio Grande.
Raf	Norway	The schooner was wrecked on the coast of Iceland.
Roseneath	United Kingdom	The schooner was driven ashore near Johnshaven, Aberdeenshire. She was on a voyage from Findochty, Moray to Sunderland, County Durham. She was refloated and taken in to Montrose, Forfarshire for repairs.
Tai Sang	United Kingdom	The steamship was driven ashore at Hong Kong in a typhoon. She was refloated.
Tempest	United Kingdom	The ship was run into by the steamship Chilton (United Kingdom) and sank at Constantinople, Ottoman Empire.
Twilight	United States	The schooner was wrecked on Shag Rock, off Cranberry Island, Maine. The captain and two of the crew got out a dory, which was struck by a sea, killing the captain and one of the men. The rest of the crew made it onto Shag Rock where they were doused by waves for 13 hours before being saved by a passing schooner.
87 unnamed vessels	Flags unknown	Sixty fishing boats and 27 smacks were driven ashore on the coast of Iceland. Seventeen smacks were wrecked with much loss of life.

== 12 September ==
List of shipwrecks: 12 September 1884
Ship	State	Description
Price Jones	United Kingdom	The smack struck rocks in Ramsey Sound and foundered. Her crew were rescued. She was on a voyage from Newport to Milford Haven, Pembrokeshire.

== 13 September ==
List of shipwrecks: 13 September 1884
Ship	State	Description
Eliza	Spain	The barque was abandoned in the Atlantic Ocean. Her crew were rescued by Mary Claasen (Germany). Elisa was on a voyage from Havana, Cuba to Antwerp, Belgium.
Hermanos	Mexico	The steamship foundered off the Frying Pan Shoals with the loss of five of her nine crew.
Unnamed	Flag unknown	The brig was wrecked on the Seven Stones Reef, Cornwall United Kingdom.

== 14 September ==
List of shipwrecks: 14 September 1884
Ship	State	Description
John Cartmel	United Kingdom	The schooner was driven ashore at Jurby, Isle of Man. Her crew were rescued.

== 17 September ==
List of shipwrecks: 17 September 1884
Ship	State	Description
Tiverton	United Kingdom	The steamship ran aground at Nagasaki, Japan in a typhoon. She was refloated.

== 18 September ==
List of shipwrecks: 18 September 1884
Ship	State	Description
Diolibah	United Kingdom	The steamship ran aground at Buenos Aires, Argentina.

== 19 September ==
List of shipwrecks: 19 September 1884
Ship	State	Description
Reaumur	France	The steamship was driven ashore near Noirmoutier-en-l'Île, Vendée. She was a total loss.
Secret	United Kingdom	The schooner was driven ashore near Mousehole, Cornwall. She was on a voyage from Port Madoc, Caernarfonshire to Calais, France. She was refloated and towed in to Penzance, Cornwall in a leaky condition by the tug Merlin (United Kingdom).

== 20 September ==
List of shipwrecks: 20 September 1884
Ship	State	Description
Catharina	Netherlands	The barque put in to Cape Town, Cape Colony on fire.
Charles Chalmers	United Kingdom	The brig was driven ashore at the mouth of the Ythan. She was refloated and towed in to Aberdeen.
RMS Cordillera	United Kingdom	The steamship struck rocks in the Strait of Magellan at San Isidro, Chile. Six of the passengers were taken off by Uarda (Germany) the following day and the rest were taken off by Neko (Flag unknown) on 23 September. Cordillera was on a voyage from Liverpool, Lancashire to Valparaíso, Chile. She was abandoned as a total loss.
Killarney	United Kingdom	The steamship ran ashore in the Humber at Whitton, Lincolnshire. She was on a voyage from Goole, Yorkshire to Ghent, East Flanders, Belgium. She subsequently broke in two and sank.
Linwood	United Kingdom	The steamship was driven ashore at Punta del Este, Uruguay.
Nestor	Germany	The barque was run into by the steamship Camellia (United Kingdom) at North Shields, Northumberland, United Kingdom and was severely damaged.
Tredegar	United Kingdom	The schooner was run in to by the steamship Earl of Rosebery and sank at Penarth, Glamorgan. Her crew were rescued. Tredegar was on a voyage from Ely, Glamorgan to Ilfracombe, Devon.

== 21 September ==
List of shipwrecks: 21 September 1884
Ship	State	Description
Mary Josephine	United Kingdom	The ship was run into by the steamship Ackworth (United Kingdom) and sank 20 nautical miles (37 km) north east of Trevose Head, Cornwall. Her crew were rescued by Ackworth.

== 22 September ==
List of shipwrecks: 22 September 1884
Ship	State	Description
HMS Wasp	Royal Navy	The Banterer-class gunboat ran aground off Tory Island, County Donegal, and quickly sank with the loss of 52 of her 58 crew.
Welsh Prince	United Kingdom	The steamship was disabled and ran aground when a rope became entangled around her propeller at Weston-super-Mare, Somerset. Her passengers were taken off by the lifeboat William James Holt ( Royal National Lifeboat Institution). Welsh Prince was subsequently refloated and returned to service.

== 23 September ==
List of shipwrecks: 23 September 1884
Ship	State	Description
Miramar	United Kingdom	The steamship foundered in a typhoon off Wenzhou, China with the loss of all but two of her crew. She was on a voyage from Yokohama, Japan to Hong Kong.

== 24 September ==
List of shipwrecks: 24 September 1884
Ship	State	Description
Daniel Webster	Canada	The steamship was destroyed by fire at Pointe au Pic, Quebec. All on board were rescued. She was on a voyage from Chicoutimi, Quebec to Quebec City.
Arctique	France	The steamship, while on a voyage from France to Valparaíso, was wrecked in the Strait of Magellan on the northern coast of Cape Virgenes, and abandoned by her crew.

== 25 September ==
List of shipwrecks: 25 September 1884
Ship	State	Description
Santa Marguerite Ligure	Italy	The barque was run into by the steamship Wiltshire (United Kingdom) and sank in the English Channel 6 nautical miles (11 km) off Beachy Head, Sussex, United Kingdom with the loss of two of the eleven people on board. Survivors were rescued by Wiltshire. Santa Marguerite Ligure was on a voyage from Buenos Aires, Argentina to Antwerp, Belgium. The wreck was dispersed by explosives on 27 September as it was a hazard to shipping.
Three Brothers	United Kingdom	The schooner was wrecked in Bantry Bay. Her crew survived. She was on a voyage from Bantry, County Cork to Runcorn, Cheshire.

== 26 September ==
List of shipwrecks: 26 September 1884
Ship	State	Description
Athelstane	United Kingdom	The steamship ran aground in the River Thames downstream of Gravesend, Kent. She was on a voyage from Antwerp, Belgium to London.
Friedrich	Germany	The schooner collided with the steamship Chatham (United Kingdom) and sank in the Rio Grande.

== 27 September ==
List of shipwrecks: 27 September 1884
Ship	State	Description
Albyn	United Kingdom	The ship struck the pier at Maryport, Cumberland and sank. Her three crew were rescued. She was on a voyage from Strangford, County Down to Maryport.
Flying Spray	United Kingdom	The fishing boat foundered in the North Sea 5 nautical miles (9.3 km) off Whitby, Yorkshire with the loss of all five crew.
Frederick	United Kingdom	The Mersey Flat collided with the steamship Derwent (United Kingdom) and sank off Egremont, Lancashire. Her crew were rescued by Derwent. Frederick was on a voyage from Liverpool, Lancashire to Flint.
Souveneir	France	The fishing lugger was run into by a British smack and was severely damaged the North Sea 130 nautical miles (240 km) off Yorkshire. She put in to Scarborough in a leaky condition on 1 October.
Vara	Norway	The steamship was wrecked on Jedder's Reef. She was on a voyage from Scotlant to a Baltic port.

== 29 September ==
List of shipwrecks: 29 September 1884
Ship	State	Description
Bushire	United Kingdom	The steamship collided with the steamship Bernina (United Kingdom) and sank off Lisbon, Portugal with the loss of fifteen of her 27 crew. Bushire was on a voyage from Cardiff, Glamorgan to Bussorah, Persia.
Finchley	United Kingdom	The steamship struck a rock and sank off Isaacs Harbour, Nova Scotia, Canada. All on board survived. She was on a voyage "Coosaw" to Dublin.
Zadock	United Kingdom	The ship caught fire whilst on a voyage from Liverpool, Lancashire to Iquique, Peru. The fire was extinguished on 2 October.

== 30 September ==
List of shipwrecks: 30 September 1884
Ship	State	Description
Loando, and Queen of Australia	United Kingdom	The steamship Loando collided with Queen of Australia in the River Mersey. Both vessels were severely damaged. Loando was on a voyage from Africa to Liverpool, Lancashire.
Paragon	United Kingdom	The sloop was driven ashore and wrecked at Redcar, North Riding of Yorkshire. She was on a voyage from Scarborough, Yorkshire to Hartlepool, County Durham.

== Unknown date ==
List of shipwrecks: Unknown date in September 1884
Ship	State	Description
Alantas	Flag unknown	The ship foundered with the loss of all hands, according to a message in a bottle that washed up between Étaples and Le Portel, Pas-de-Calais, France on 7 September.
Alfred Marie, and Onni	Netherlands; Norway	The schooner Onni and the brig Alfred Marie collided. Onni sank; her crew were rescued. She was on a voyage from Grangemouth, Stirlingshire, United Kingdom to Køge, Denmark. Alfred Marie was severely damaged. She was on a voyage from Sundsvall, Sweden to Delfzijl, Groningen. She put in to Helsingør, Denmark.
Bridegroom	United Kingdom	The barquentine was destroyed by fire at sea. Her crew were rescued. She was on a voyage from Liverpool, Lancashire to Valparaíso, Chile.
Cambridge	United Kingdom	The ship ran aground on the Holywood Bank, in the Belfast Lough. She was on a voyage from Maryport, Cumberland to Belfast, County Antrim.
Chimon	Greece	The schooner collided with the steamship Ceres (Netherlands) and sank in the Mediterranean Sea. Her crew were rescued.
Colombo	Italy	The schooner ran aground on the Marzocco Bank, in the Mediterranean Sea. She was on a voyage from Susa, Ottoman Tripolitania to Livorno.
Colombo	United Kingdom	The steamship was driven ashore in Chesapeake Bay. She was on a voyage from Baltimore, Maryland to Belfast. She was refloated and resumed her voyage.
Dauntless	United Kingdom	The smack ran aground on the North Rock, off the coast of County Antrim. She was on a voyage from Saint-Malo, Ille-et-Vilaine, France to Belfast.
Earl of Wemyss	United Kingdom	The ship was driven ashore. She was on a voyage from Levuka, Fiji Islands to the Ba River. She was refloated and taken in to Ba, Fiji Islands in a leaky condition.
Elisa	Spain	The barque was in abandoned early September. Her were rescued by the brig Claason (United Kingdom).
Elise	United Kingdom	The ship was driven ashore and wrecked at Eyemouth, Berwickshire. Her eight crew were rescued. She was on a voyage from Peterhead, Aberdeenshire to Sunderland, County Durham.
Eliza Ann	United Kingdom	The ship foundered at sea. Her crew were rescued.
Eliza Campbell	United Kingdom	The barque was wrecked. Her crew were rescued. She was on a voyage from Valparaíso to Falmouth, Cornwall.
Frederick Scalla	Germany	The barque was abandoned in the Atlantic Ocean. Her crew were rescued by the brig F. Y. Merryman (United States).
Gainsford	United Kingdom	The steamship was driven ashore at "Casillo", Uruguay.
George	United Kingdom	The Thames barge struck a sunken wreck and sank at the Nore. Her crew were rescued. She was on a voyage from Chatham, Kent to London.
George Gordon	United Kingdom	The ship was wrecked on the Eastern Fields Reef, off the coast of Queensland. Her crew survived. She was on a voyage from Newcastle, New South Wales to Batavia, Netherlands East Indies.
Glencoe	United Kingdom	The steamship ran aground on the Plough Rock, off the coast of Northumberland. Her crew survived.
Halcyon	United States	The barque was abandoned at sea. Her crew were rescued. She was on a voyage from New York to Cette, Hérault, France.
Janie	United Kingdom	The schooner was wrecked in the Rio Grande. Her crew were rescued. She was on a voyage from Glasgow, Renfrewshire to the Rio Grande.
John Eills	Canada	The ship was wrecked on the Memory Rock. She was on a voyage from Pensacola, Florida to New York, United States.
Kate	United Kingdom	The ketch was driven ashore at Dungeness, Kent. She was on a voyage from Sunderland, County Durham to Southampton, Hampshire. She was refloated and assisted in to Ramsgate, Kent.
Lake Champlain	Canada	The steamship sank at Liverpool. She was on a voyage from Montreal, Quebec to Liverpool. She was later refloated.
Lastingham	United Kingdom	The ship was lost on Port Jackson Head, Cook's Straight with the loss of fourteen of the 31 people on board. She was on a voyage from London to Wellington, New Zealand.
Levant	United Kingdom	The brig was driven ashore at Egmond aan Zee, North Holland, Netherlands.
Levenvale	United Kingdom	The steamship struck a rock and sank 2 nautical miles (3.7 km) off the Île Vierge, Finistère, France. Her crew survived. She was on a voyage from Rochester, Kent to Poti, Russia.
Marseille	France	The steamship was driven ashore near Key West. Her passengers were taken off. She was on a voyage from Bordeaux, Gironde to New Orleans, Louisiana, United States. She was refloated and resumed her voyage.
Minnie Butler	(Canada)	The ship was abandoned in the Atlantic Ocean. Her crew were rescued by the steamship Kepler (United Kingdom).
Œnone	United Kingdom	The yacht sprang a leak and was beached near Knockadoon Head, County Cork. She was severely damaged and was abandoned as a total loss. Œnone was refloated on 9 September and towed in to Youghal, County Cork.
Perseverance	United Kingdom	The ship was driven ashore at Oxwich, Glamorgan.
Saintonge	United Kingdom	The steamship collided with another vessel and was beached at Swansea, Glamorgan.
St. Pierre	France	The steamship collided with the steamship Janus (United Kingdom) and sank at Bordeaux.
Sully	France	The barque was driven ashore in the Marquesas Keys. She was on a voyage from Mexico to Havre de Grâce, Seine-Inférieure. She was refloated and towed in to Key West, Florida, United States.
Swallow	United States	The ship was abandoned in the Atlantic Ocean. Nineteen crew were rescued by the barque Ernst Ludwig Holtz (Germany).
Traveller	Norway	The barque ran aground in the River Avon near the Clifton Suspension Bridge. She was on a voyage from Saint John, New Brunswick, Canada to Bristol, Gloucestershire, United Kingdom.
Ville de Bordeaux	France	The steamship was driven ashore on Guadeloupe. She was refloated and towed in to Martinique.
Whitby Abbey	United Kingdom	The steamship was driven ashore at Constantinople, Ottoman Empire. She was on a voyage from Cardiff, Glamorgan to Constantinople.
William	United Kingdom	The brigantine was wrecked on the Shipwash Sand, in the North Sea off the coast of Suffolk. Her seven crew survived; three of them were rescued from a raft by the steamship Maggie (United Kingdom).
Zazel	United Kingdom	The yacht was driven ashore and wrecked in Llandudno Bay. Her crew were rescued.
Unnamed	Austria-Hungary	The ship was run down and sunk off the coast of Istria by the steamship Calabria (Italy) with the loss of one life. Survivors were rescued by Calabria.
