= Albacore-class gunboat =

Two classes of British Royal Navy gunboats have been named Albacore-class gunboats:

- Albacore-class gunboat (1855), a class of 98 gunboats built for use in the Crimean War
- Albacore-class gunboat (1883), a class of three composite screw gunboats
