= Bramble-class gunboat =

Two classes of British Royal Navy gunboats have been named Bramble-class gunboats:

- Bramble-class gunboat (1886)
- Bramble-class gunboat (1898)
