= HMS Lizard (1886) =

Gunboat of the Royal Navy

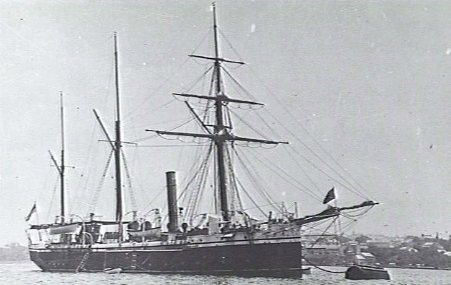
- HMS Lizard, c. 1890

History

United Kingdom
- Name: HMS Lizard
- Builder: Harland & Wolff, Belfast
- Yard number: 190
- Launched: 27 November 1886
- Completed: 4 February 1887
- Fate: Sold February 1905 for breaking up.

General characteristics
- Class & type: Bramble-class screw gunboat
- Displacement: 715 tons (810 tons loaded)
- Length: 165 ft (50 m)
- Beam: 29 ft (8.8 m)
- Draught: 11.2 ft (3.4 m)
- Propulsion: Triple expansion steam engine; Single screw
- Speed: 13 kn (24 km/h)
- Range: 2,500 nmi (4,600 km) at 10 kn (19 km/h)
- Complement: 76
- Armament: Six 4-inch 25 cwt RBL guns; Four machine guns

HMS Lizard was a Bramble-class screw gunboat of the Royal Navy, built by Harland & Wolff, Belfast and launched on 27 November 1886.

She commenced service on the Australia Station in January 1888, serving in New Zealand waters. Commander John Campbell Watson was appointed in command in July 1899, and served until late 1902. In 1900 she was detached to serve on the China Station during the Boxer Rebellion, and she stayed in Chinese waters until August 1901, when she returned to the Australia station. She was the first warship to enter Kiama, New South Wales. Her crew was paid off in September 1902 and ordered back home on a steamship. She was laid up at Sydney in 1904.

== Fate ==
She was sold in February 1905 for £800 and was broken up at Balmain, Sydney.
