= Killearn (disambiguation) =

Killearn is a village in the Stirling council area of Scotland.

Killearn may also refer to:

- Killearn railway station, a railway station on the Blane Valley Railway serving the village of Killearn
- Killearn Hospital, a health facility serving the village of Killearn
- Baron Killearn, a title in the Peerage of the United Kingdom
- Miles Lampson, 1st Baron Killearn, the first holder of the title Baron Killearn
- Killearn Plantation Archeological and Historic District, a historic district in Tallahassee, Florida

== See also ==
- Killarney (disambiguation)
