= Dumgoyne railway station =

Disused railway station in Killearn, Stirling

Dumgoyne
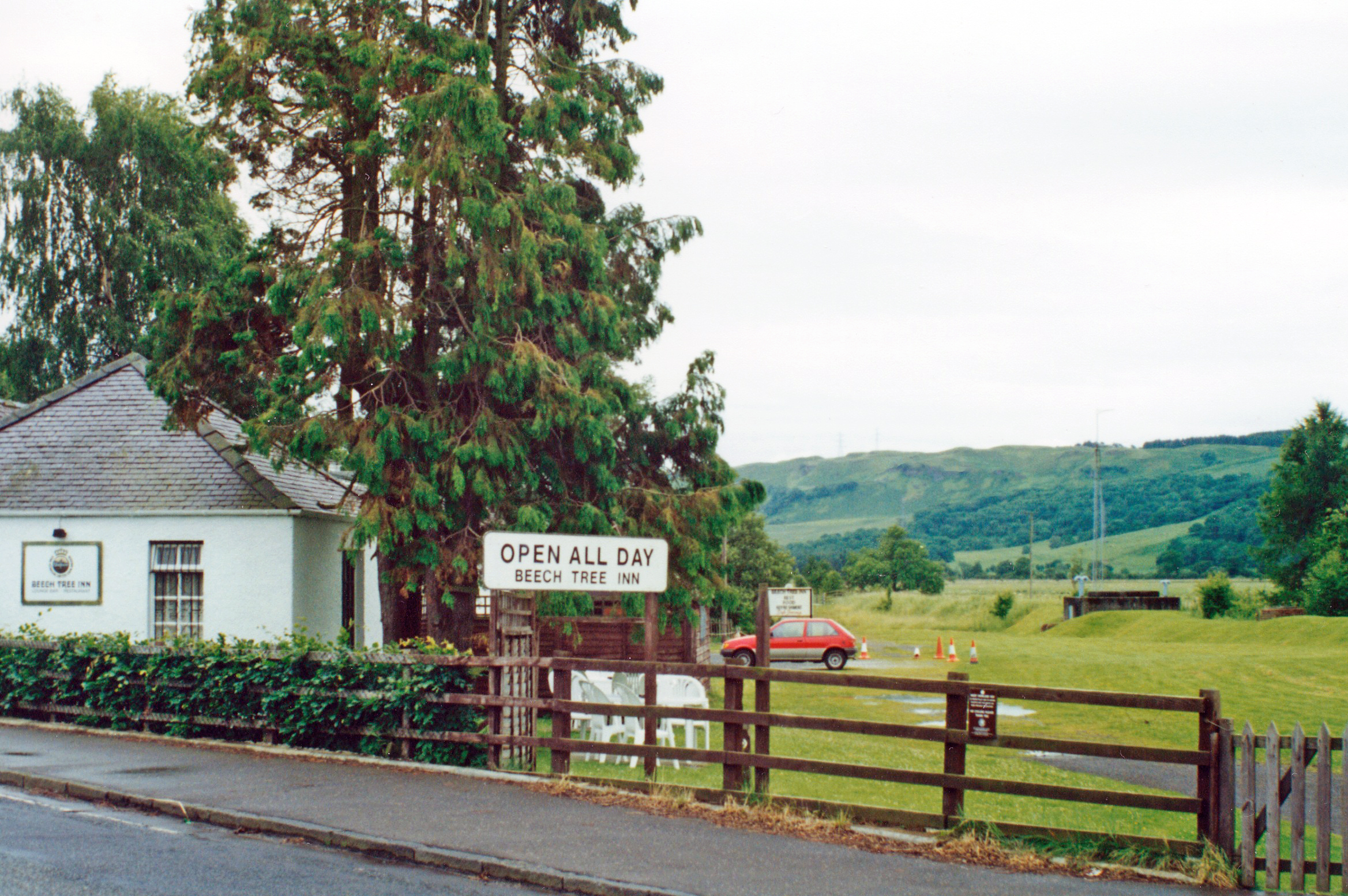
- The site of the station, looking south towards Lenzie, in 1997

General information
- Location: Killearn, Stirling; Scotland
- Coordinates: 56.0212°N 4.3713°W
- Grid reference: NS523834
- Platforms: 2

Other information
- Status: Disused

History
- Original company: North British Railway
- Post-grouping: LNER; British Railways (Scottish Region)

Key dates
- 1 July 1867: Opened as Killearn
- 1 October 1882: Name changed to Killearn (Old)
- 1 April 1896: Name changed to Dumgoyne Hill
- 28 September 1897: Name changed to Dumgoyne
- 1 October 1951: Closed to passengers
- 5 October 1959: Closed completely
Location

Dumgoyne railway station served the village of Killearn, Stirling, Scotland from 1867 to 1951 on the Blane Valley Railway.

== History ==
The station was opened on 1 July 1867 as Killearn by the Blane Valley Railway. It was originally the terminus station until the Strathendrick and Aberfoyle Railway extended the line northwards to Killearn and Gartness Junction (on the Forth and Clyde Junction Railway), this section opening on 1 October 1882, at which point this station's name was changed to Killearn (Old).

The station's name was changed again to Dumgoyne Hill on 1 April 1896 and to Dumgoyne on 28 September 1897.

To the southeast was an engine shed, to the east was the goods yard and shed and to the southeast was the signal box. Glengoyne Distillery was also to the east.

The station was host to a LNER camping coach from 1937 to 1939.

The station closed to passengers on 1 October 1951 and to goods traffic on 5 October 1959.

Preceding station	Disused railways	Following station
Killearn; Line and station closed	North British Railway; Blane Valley Railway	Blanefield; Line and station closed
