= HMS Express (1874) =

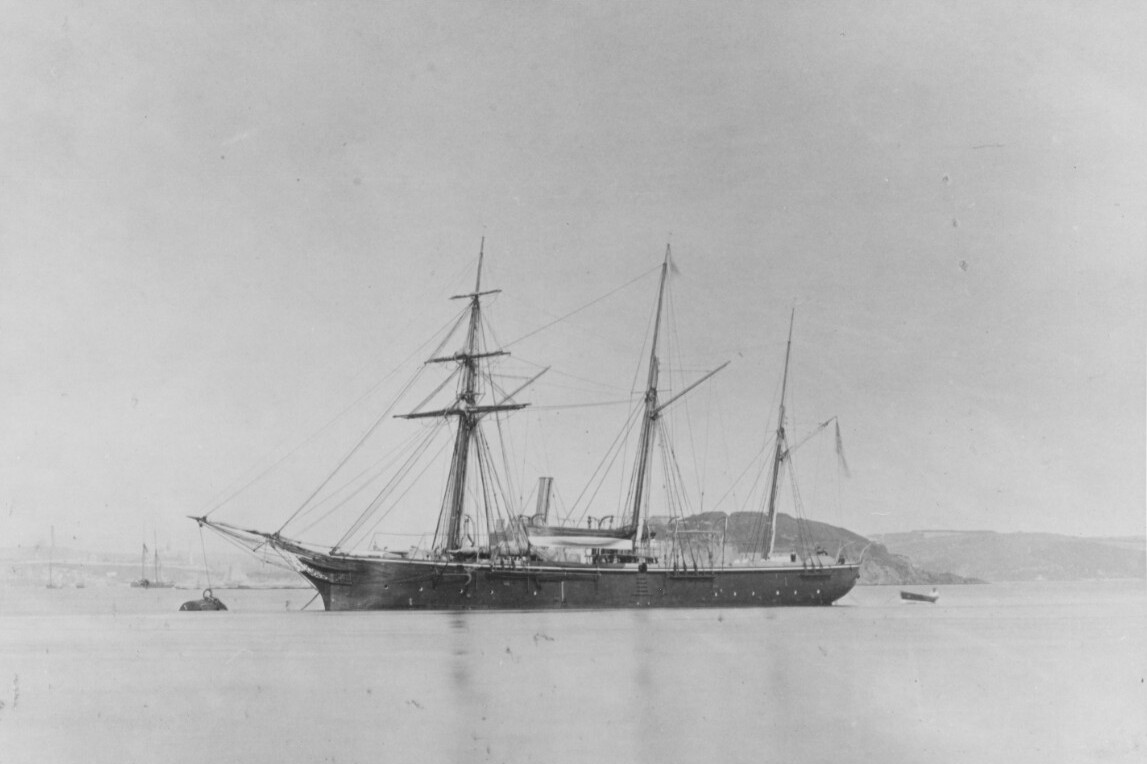
A postcard of HMS Express

HMS Express was a Forester-class gunboat built by William Doxford & Sons Ltd for the Royal Navy.

The Express was the second of the class launched, on 16 July 1874, and commissioned at HMNB Devonport on 10 August 1875.

In 1877, the Express was detailed to North Africa. Whilst at Gibraltar, it was involved in the capture of a number of Spanish smugglers.

Whilst returning from Africa, the Express suffered a broken main shaft near Cape Verde and was taken under tow by HMS Banterer.

The vessel remained in service until being sold in August 1889, to G Rodrigues of Liverpool. Whilst under tow from Plymouth to Liverpool, it became separated from its tug and was sunk on 7 October 1889 in a Force 11 gale, running onto rocks near Aberffraw, Wales.
