= Killarney (disambiguation) =

Killarney is a town in County Kerry, southwestern Ireland.

Killarney may also refer to:

== Places ==
=== Australia ===
- Killarney, Queensland
- Killarney Station, Northern Territory
- Killarney, Victoria

=== Bahamas ===
- Killarney (Bahamas Parliament constituency)

=== Canada ===
- Killarney, Calgary
- Killarney, Edmonton
- Killarney, Manitoba
- Killarney, Ontario
- Killarney, Vancouver

=== South Africa ===
- Killarney, Johannesburg

=== United States ===
- Killarney, Florida
- Killarney, Georgia
- Killarney (Ferriday, Louisiana), a historic mansion

=== Zimbabwe ===
- Killarney, Zimbabwe

== Other uses ==
- USS Killarney (SP-219), a United States Navy patrol vessel in commission from 1917 to 1919
- Killarney Motor Racing Complex, in Cape Town, South Africa
- Killarney National Park, in Ireland
- Killarney Provincial Park in Ontario, Canada
- Killarney Secondary School, a public school in Vancouver, Canada
- Killarney, another name for Stollmeyer's Castle
- "Killarney", an 1857 song by Michael Balfe and Edmund Falconer

== See also ==
- Killearn (disambiguation)
