= HMS Wasp (1880) =

Gunboat of the Royal Navy

- HMS Wasp

History

United Kingdom
- Name: HMS Wasp
- Builder: Barrow Iron Shipbuilding
- Yard number: 71
- Launched: 5 October 1880
- Commissioned: 1 December 1881
- Fate: Wrecked on 22 September 1884; Wreck sold in November 1910

General characteristics
- Class & type: Banterer-class gunboat
- Displacement: 465 tons
- Length: 125 ft (38.1 m) pp
- Beam: 23 ft 6 in (7.2 m)
- Draught: 10 ft (3.0 m)
- Installed power: 360 ihp (270 kW)
- Propulsion: 2-cylinder horizontal compound-expansion steam engine; Single screw
- Sail plan: Barquentine
- Speed: 9 1/2 knots (17.6 km/h; 10.9 mph)
- Range: 40 tons coal
- Complement: 60
- Armament: 2 × 6-inch/64-pdr (56 cwt) muzzle-loading rifles; 2 × 4-inch/20-pdr BL guns; 2 × machine guns

HMS Wasp was a Banterer-class composite screw gunboat of the Royal Navy, built in 1880 by Barrow Iron Shipbuilding and wrecked off Tory Island in 1884.

== Design ==
The Banterer class was designed by Nathaniel Barnaby, the Admiralty Director of Naval Construction. They were of composite construction, meaning that the iron keel, frames, stem and stern posts were of iron, while the hull was planked with timber. This had the advantage of allowing the vessels to be coppered, thus keeping marine growth under control, a problem that caused iron-hulled ships to be frequently docked. They were 125 feet (38 m) in length and displaced 465 tonnes. In appearance they were distinguishable from the preceding Foresters (also a Barnaby design) by their vertical stems.

=== Propulsion ===
A two-cylinder horizontal compound-expansion steam engine by the builder, Barrow Iron Shipbuilding, provided 360 indicated horsepower (270 kW) (Note: Winfield gives 440 ihp (330 kW) for the class as a whole, and the individual figures for ships of the class vary between 350 and 480 ihp (260 and 360 kW); no figure is given by Winfield for Wasp herself.) through a single screw, sufficient to drive Wasp at 9.5 knots (17.6 km/h; 10.9 mph).

=== Armament ===
Ships of the class were armed with two 6-inch 64-pounder muzzle-loading rifles (a conversion of the smoothbore 32-pounder 58 cwt gun) and two 4-inch 20-pounder breech loading guns. A pair of machine guns were also fitted.

== Construction and career ==
Her keel was laid at Barrow Iron Shipbuilding as yard number 71 and she was launched on 5 October 1880. She was rigged with three masts, making her a barquentine-rigged vessel. Wasp was commissioned on 1 December 1881.

=== Fate ===
On her final voyage, Wasp, under the command of Lieutenant J.D. Nicholls, was sailing from Westport, County Mayo, in the West of Ireland, to Moville in Inishowen, County Donegal, in Ulster, to pick up a party of police, bailiffs and court officials, who were to be transported to Inishtrahull Island off Malin Head to carry out evictions for non-payment of rents. The same ship had delivered urgently needed supplies of seed potatoes to the same islanders the previous year.

In the early morning of 22 September 1884, Wasp was near Tory Island. The weather was cloudy with occasional squalls and rain showers. The commanding officer and most of the crew were in their bunks; the lieutenant navigating the ship was relatively unfamiliar with the area the ship was sailing. At 3:55 a.m. Wasp ran aground on a reef. The initial shock broke the hull of the ship, and she began to rapidly fill with water. The commander ordered the ship's boats lowered, but Wasp hit the reefs again, sinking so quickly that the boats could not be launched. Within fifteen minutes Wasp had sunk. Six crewmen managed to cling to one of the gunboat's spars; they washed ashore on Tory Island and were found by islanders. The other 52 crew aboard drowned.

A court martial was held for the survivors; the finding was that the cause of the wreck was a lack of care taken with the vessel's navigation, but the survivors were all exonerated. The wreck was sold to the Cornish Salvage Co. in November 1910.
