= Killearn railway station =

Disused railway station in Killearn, Stirling

Killearn

General information
- Location: Killearn, Stirling; Scotland
- Coordinates: 56.0382°N 4.3942°W
- Grid reference: NS509853
- Platforms: 2

Other information
- Status: Disused

History
- Opened: 2 October 1882; 143 years ago Opened as Killearn (New)
- Original company: North British Railway
- Post-grouping: LNER; British Railways (Scottish Region)

Key dates
- 1 April 1896: Name changed to Killearn
- 1 October 1951: Closed to passengers
- 5 October 1959: Closed completely
Location

Killearn railway station served the village of Killearn, Stirling, Scotland from 1882 to 1951 on the Blane Valley Railway.

== History ==
The station opened as Killearn (New) on 2 October 1882 by the Strathendrick and Aberfoyle Railway when it extended the Blane Valley Railway northwards from Killearn (Old) to Gartness Junction (on the Forth and Clyde Junction Railway). The station's name changed to Killearn on 1 April 1896 when Killearn (Old) was renamed Dumgoyne Hill.

To the west was the goods yard. The station was host to a LNER camping coach from 1936 to 1939.

The station closed to passengers on 1 October 1951 and to goods traffic on 5 October 1959.

Preceding station	Disused railways	Following station
Terminus	North British Railway; Blane Valley Railway	Dumgoyne; Line and station closed
