= HMS Wasp (1794) =

4-gun gun-vessel (1794–1802)

History

Great Britain
- Name: HMS Wasp
- Acquired: By purchase (Admiralty Order 3 February 1794)
- Fate: Sold 22 November 1802

General characteristics
- Type: Hoy
- Tons burthen: 63 (bm)
- Length: Overall: 64 ft 3 in (19.6 m); Keel; 55 ft 10 1/2 in (17.0 m)
- Beam: 14 ft 6 1/4 in (4.4 m)
- Depth of hold: 6 ft 5 in (2.0 m)
- Propulsion: Sails
- Sail plan: sloop
- Complement: 30
- Armament: 1 × 24-pounder gun + 3 × 32-pounder carronades

HMS Wasp was a 4-gun gun-vessel, formerly a Dutch hoy, purchased on 7 March 1794. She was fitted out at Woolwich between March and June 1794, and commissioned under Lieutenant George Hollwell. She was paid off in April 1795. Lieutenant John Wheatley recommissioned her in June. He paid her off in 1796. In September Lieutenant William Heppel recommissioned her. In February 1801 Lieutenant William Holmes replaced Heppel.

Although some records indicate that Wasp was sold at Sheerness on 22 November 1801, that actual year appears to be 1802. The Principal Officers and Commissioners of His Majesty's Navy offered the "Wasp Gun-Vessel" for sale on 22 November 1802.
