= HMS Wasp (1886) =

Gunboat of the Royal Navy

- HMS Wasp, c. 1887

History

United Kingdom
- Name: HMS Wasp
- Builder: Armstrong Mitchell, Elswick
- Yard number: 492
- Laid down: 15 August 1885
- Launched: 13 September 1886
- Completed: 4 February 1887
- Commissioned: 21 April 1887
- Stricken: 6 December 1887
- Fate: Lost at sea c. 19 September 1887

General characteristics
- Class & type: Bramble-class screw gunboat
- Displacement: 715 tons (810 tons loaded)
- Length: 165 ft (50 m)
- Beam: 29 ft (8.8 m)
- Draught: 11.2 ft (3.4 m)
- Propulsion: Triple expansion steam engine; Single screw
- Speed: 13 kn (24 km/h)
- Range: 2,500 nmi (4,600 km) at 10 kn (19 km/h)
- Complement: 73
- Armament: Six 4-inch 25 cwt RBL guns; Four machine guns

HMS Wasp was a Bramble-class screw gunboat of the Royal Navy, built by Armstrong Mitchell at Elswick on the River Tyne and launched on 13 September 1886. Commissioned in April 1887, the ship was lost at sea in September 1887 while en-route to take up station at Shanghai.

Wasp was the first Royal navy ship to utilise a triple-expansion steam engine.

== Service ==
Wasp was commissioned at Sheerness on 21 April 1887 under the command of Lt Bryan J. H. Adamson. Sailing from Sheerness on 21 May 1887, Wasp was to take station at Shanghai replacing HMS Midge. Wasp arrived at Singapore on 24 August 1887.

== Loss ==
Wasp departed Singapore on 10 September 1887, bound for Shanghai although the ship was expected to call at Hong Kong. On 7 October 1887 Commodore Maxwell, commanding officer at Hong Kong, sent a telegram to the Admiralty that Wasp was three weeks overdue and that other vessels had been sent to search.

The barque Oxford sank in a typhoon off Luzon on 19 September 1887. The chief mate of the Oxford suggested that Wasp sank during the same typhoon.

Towards the end of October 1887, a report appeared in several Australian and New Zealand papers that the crew had been found and rescued by HMS Calliope but by early November the Sydney Morning Herald was reporting that no trace of the Wasp or the crew had been found and that expert opinion was that the ship had sunk in a typhoon.

On 6 December 1887 the Admiralty announced that there was no hope of finding the ship or crew and that the books of HMS Wasp were to be closed with immediate effect and all relevant payments paid to the families of the crew.

In the aftermath of the loss, various theories surrounding the loss were postulated.

One was that stores the ship had taken on in Singapore for transport to Hong Kong affected the handling of the vessel and also hampered the crew's progress around the ship making it more difficult to respond to adverse conditions. Although this was never denied or refuted, several senior navy officers signed an appendix to the Navy Estimates that the design and build of the Wasp was as safe and seaworthy as it could be.

Another theory was that the ship was under-crewed and that the executive branch officers were too inexperienced. In August Lt Adamson had written to his mother; "I don't much care for my command. Things may turn out better but with the two inexperienced officers I have to assist me I am captain, first lieutenant and navigator—all in one." Comparison was also made with other ships on similar duties which were all shown to have officers of higher rank in command and also had more executive branch officers and seamen. The Admiralty refuted the under-crewing, in a statement in November 1887 Lord Walter Kerr, then secretary to the First Lord of the Admiralty, pointed out that the complement of the ship had been increased from 63 to 73 prior to departure from England following representations from Lt Adamson and that on departure from Singapore, a supernumerary officer and several seamen were being carried on passage to Shanghai. Lord Kerr also quoted an officer from HMS Orion who had seen Adamson prior to the departure of the Wasp from Singapore stated that he had not heard any complaint from Adamson about Wasp or its crew.

In 1891 a lifebuoy from the Wasp was recovered in the China Sea and was handed in to the naval authorities in Hong Kong, this was the first report of any sign of the ship or crew.

== Memorial ==
The memorial fountain to Lt Adamson in Cullercoats

A memorial fountain dedicated to Lt Adamson was erected on the sea front in his home town of Cullercoats, Northumberland in August 1888.
