= Point Cloates =

Point in Western Australia

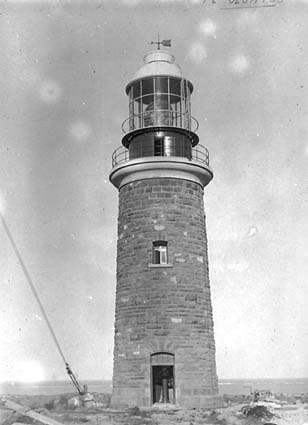
The first Point Cloates Lighthouse, built in 1910

Point Cloates (22°43′S 113°40′E), formerly known as Cloate's Island, is a peninsula approximately 100 kilometres (62 mi) south-southwest of North West Cape, in the Pilbara region of Western Australia. It features Point Cloates Lighthouse and the ruins of a previous lighthouse (built in 1910); both buildings are on Cloates Hill, which rises 41 metres (135 ft) above sea level.

Cloates Island, or Cloates Doubtful Island...to sailors in olden days...was an island of mystery; and for ... sea captains who made it their duty to fall in with New Holland it possessed a peculiar attraction. They looked for it and wrote about it in their log-books more than any other part of the continent because for years people were wont to disbelieve in its existence too. Owing to the hidden trendings in the coast and the elbow that is formed in its outline where they first sighted land a difficult problem was presented to one sailor after another which none could solve. Early explorers had passed along this portion of the coast, though none had named the point until in 1719 it was suddenly christened Cloates Island, and Cloates Island it remained until a hundred years later, when King proved it to be a peninsula. This supposed island was discovered by Captain Nash (possibly an Englishman), in command of a Flemish ship, the "House of Austria," bound from Ostend to China. On seeing it he wrote in his journal: 'Being clear weather brought to, sounded, and had no ground with 100 fms. though not above four miles offshore. The day before and several days after observed an incredible quantity of seaweed like that from the Gulf of Florida and small birds like lapwings both in size and flight. This island cannot be seen far even in clear weather and lies N.E. by E. and S.W. by S. about 32 leagues in length with terrible breakers from each end running about three miles into the sea.' He gave the lat. as 22° S. and from it made 7°26' westing to Java Head. As he could find no account of this land in any of his books or charts Captain Nash named it Cloates or Cloot's Island in honour of a Flemish Baron, one of the owners of the ship.

— Ida Lee, 1925

During the 17th and 18th centuries, the first European mariners to see Point Cloates believed the area between the point and North West Cape to be a small island, which became known to them as Cloat's Island. The "island" was often confused with other geographical features; these errors led to it being mismapped, as well as suggestions that its existence was doubtful, or that it was a phantom island.

The first Europeans to report seeing the point, in 1618, were Captain Lenaert Jacobszoon and supercargo Willem Janszoon, in the Dutch East India Company ship Mauritius.

On 1 May 1622, John Brooke, captain of Tryall claimed to have sighted an island in the area, while en route from England to Batavia (Jakarta), in the Dutch East Indies. (Tryall was wrecked shortly afterwards, on the rocks that now bear its name, north of the Montebello Islands.)

The name Cloate's or Cloat's Island originated with a European mariner named Nash, who in 1719 named it after one of the owners of his vessel, a Flemish baron. Nash is believed to have been English, and the spelling may be an anglicisation of the Flemish surname Cloot. Nash was commanding a Flemish (probably Austrian Netherlands) ship called House of Austria en route from Ostend to a port in China. Nash estimated that the island was "32 leagues" (183 kilometres or 114 miles) in length.

Guthrie's world map of 1785 shows the island at 97° east longitude, due south of Keeling Island, which is 16 degrees west and more than 1,600 kilometres (990 mi) east of Point Cloates. Such errors led some cartographers to classify Cloats Island as a "doubtful". For instance, James Horsburgh wrote in The India Directory, first published in 1809, that: "Cloates Island very probably has no real existence."

A spearfishing group off Point Cloates in 1978 located a shipwreck that has been identified as the American China trading vessel Rapid (1811).

Uncertainty regarding the location and nature of the "island" may have contributed to the loss of the Portuguese Navy aviso Correio da Azia, bound for Macau in 1816. After running aground on Ningaloo Reef, Correio was abandoned and later sank.

In 1827, Phillip Parker King suggested that the island was a peninsula. Nevertheless, Cloates Island remained on some later marine charts and world maps.

In 1887 the ship SS Perth (formerly SS Penola), was wrecked near the cape.

The ruins of the first Point Cloates Lighthouse, built in 1910, are listed in the Western Australian register of heritage places.

In 1912, the Western Australian government granted a whaling licence to a Norwegian company to operate whaling stations at Frenchman's Bay near Albany and Norwegian Bay (near Point Cloates).
