= Great Armament =

The Great Armament was the popular name given to the rapid build-up in the strength of the British Royal Navy as a consequence of the need for inshore warfare vessels that emerged during the 1854-56 Crimean War against Russia. These forces were for deployment not only in the Black Sea and Sea of Azof, but equally in the campaigns in the Baltic Sea and Gulf of Bothnia. Following the end of that war, many of the numerous steam-driven gunboats produced as part of the Great Armament were deployed in many other locations around the world, as far apart as Africa and China.

== Orders ==
Between 27 March 1854, when Britain declared war on Russia (France followed suit the next day) and 30 March 1856, when the Treaty of Peace was signed in Paris, the following small naval vessels were ordered by the British Admiralty; all except the mortar vessels (which were sail propelled only) and the (iron-hulled) mortar floats (which were not self-propelled) had steam screw propulsion:

| Order date | Number and class | Vessel names | Contract or dockyard | Named on |
|---|---|---|---|---|
| 10 April 1854 | 6 Arrow-class despatch gunvessels | Arrow, Beagle, Lynx, Snake, Viper, Wrangler | Contract | 2 May |
| 16 June 1854 | 2 Gleaner-class gunboats | Gleaner, Ruby | Deptford Dockyard | 10 April |
| 24 June 1854 | 4 Gleaner-class gunboats | Pelter, Pincher, Badger, Snapper | Contract | 10 April |
| 4 October 1854 | 5 floating batteries | Glatton, Trusty, Aetna (original), Meteor, Thunder | Contract | 10 October |
| 6 October 1854 | 10 mortar vessels (65-ft class) | Flamer, Firm, Havock, Hardy, Growler, Surly, Blazer, Mastiff, Manly, Porpoise | Contract | Names were replaced by numbers MV.3 to MV.12 on 10 October 1855 |
| 6 October 1854 | 14 Dapper-class gunboats | Hind, Jackdaw, Starling, Thistle, Snap, Weazel, Redwing, Clinker, Cracker, Boxer, Stork, Skylark, Biter, Swinger | Contract | 14 October |
| 9 October 1854 | 4 Dapper-class gunboats | Dapper, Fancy, Grinder, Jasper | Contract | 14 October |
| 20 October 1854 | 2 Dapper-class gunboats | Lark, Magpie | Deptford Dockyard | 14 October |
| 22 December 1854 | 10 mortar vessels (70-ft class) | Raven, Rocket, Redbreast, Prompt, Pickle, Magnet, Camel, Beacon, Carron, Grappler | Contract | Names were replaced by numbers MV.13 to MV.22 on 10 October 1855 |
| 18 April 1855 | 2 Vigilant-class despatch gunvessels (1st class) | Flying Fish, Pioneer | Pembroke Dockyard | 30 May |
| 18 April 1855 | 4 Albacore-class gunboats | Nightingale, Violet, Beaver, Whiting | Contract | 30 May |
| 2 May 1855 | 2 Cheerful-class gunboats | Cheerful, Chub | Deptford & Sheerness Dockyards | 30 May |
| 2 May 1855 | 6 Albacore-class gunboats | Skipjack, Seagull, Sandfly, Sheldrake, Plover, Tickler | Contract | 30 May |
| 15 May 1855 | 2 Intrepid-class despatch gunvessels (1st class) | Victor, Intrepid | Contract | 30 May |
| 15 May 1855 | 4 Vigilant-class despatch gunvessels (2nd class) | Alacrity, Vigilant, Coquette, Wanderer | Contract | 30 May |
| 30 June 1855 | 14 Albacore-class gunboats | Banterer, Bullfrog, Bustard, Carnation, Charger, Cockchafer, Dove, Forward, Grasshopper, Hasty, Herring, Insolent, Matflower, Staunch | Contract | 16 July |
| 25 July 1855 | 2 Intrepid-class despatch gunvessels (1st class) | Nimrod, Roebuck | Contract | 21 August |
| 26 July 1855 | 10 Vigilant-class despatch gunvessels (2nd class) | Reward, Foxhound, Mohawk, Sparrowhawk, Cormorant, Osprey, Lapwing, Ringdove, Assurance, Surprise | Contract | 21 August |
| 26 July 1855 | 24 Albacore-class gunboats | Charon, Haughty, Leveret, Mackerel, Procris, Shamrock, Spey, Tilbury, Fervent, Forester, Griper, Spanker, Thrasher, Traveller, Bouncer, Hyaena, Savage, Wolf, Goldfinch, Goshawk, Opossum, Partridge, Julia, Louisa | Contract | 21 August |
| 2 October 1855 | 16 mortar vessels (75-ft class) | MV.23 to MV.37, and MV.44 | Contract | Numbered only |
| 3 October 1855 | 6 mortar vessels (75-ft class) | MV.38 to MV.43 | Contract | Numbered only |
| 3 October 1855 | 6 Albacore-class gunboats | Peacock, Pheasant, Primrose, Pickle, Prompt, Porpoise | Contract | |
| 4 October 1855 | 15 Albacore-class gunboats | Firm, Flamer, Fly, Sepoy, Erne, Spider, Lively, Surly, Swan, Delight, Grappler, Growler, Parthian, Quail, Ripple | Contract | |
| 7 October 1855 | 6 Albacore-class gunboats | Cochin, Cherokee, Camel, Caroline, Confounder, Crocus | Contract | |
| 8 October 1855 | 13 Albacore-class gunboats | Beacon, Brave, Blazer, Bullfinch, Brazen, Hardy, Havock, Highlander, Rainbow, Raven, Redbreast, Rocket, Rose | Contract | |
| 9 October 1855 | 4 Albacore-class gunboats | Albacore, Amelia, Foam, Wave | Contract | |
| 9 October 1855 | 4 mortar vessels (75-ft class) | MV.45 to MV.48 | Contract | Numbered only |
| 10 October 1855 | 4 Albacore-class gunboats | Magnet, Manly, Mastiff, Mistletoe | Contract | |
| 11 October 1855 | 2 Albacore-class gunboats | Ernest, Escort | Contract | |
| 11 November 1855 | 4 mortar vessels (75-ft class) | MV.49 to MV.52 | Contract | Numbered only |
| 12 November 1855 | 2 Cheerful-class gunboats | Daisy, Dwarf | Contract | 6 December |
| 16 November 1855 | 1 floating battery | Aetna (replacement) | Chatham Dockyard | |
| 21 November 1855 | 4 Cheerful-class gunboats | Blossom, Gadfly, Garland, Gnat | Contract | 6 December |
| 23 November 1855 | 6 Cheerful-class gunboats | Fidget, Flirt, Onyx, Pert, Midge, Tivy | Contract | 6 December |
| 1 December 1855 | 2 Cheerful-class gunboats | Angler, Ant | Contract | 6 December |
| 2 December 1855 | 4 Cheerful-class gunboats | Nettle, Pet, Rambler, Decoy | Contract | 6 December |
| 14 December 1855 | 4 mortar vessels (75-ft class) | MV.53 to MV.56 | Contract | Numbered only |
| 22 December 1855 | 3 floating batteries (iron-hulled) | Thunderbolt, Terror, Erebus | Contract | 18 January |
| 31 December 1855 | 6 Clown-class gunboats | Fenella, Garnet, Handy, Hunter, Watchful, Woodcock | Contract | 19 January |
| 3 January 1856 | 2 Clown-class gunboats | Drake, Janus | Pembroke Dockyard | 19 January |
| 3 January 1856 | 4 Clown-class gunboats | Ready, Thrush, Clown, Kestrel | Contract | 19 January |

The above list excludes major warships (ships of the line and frigates) ordered during this two-year period.
