= SS Penola =

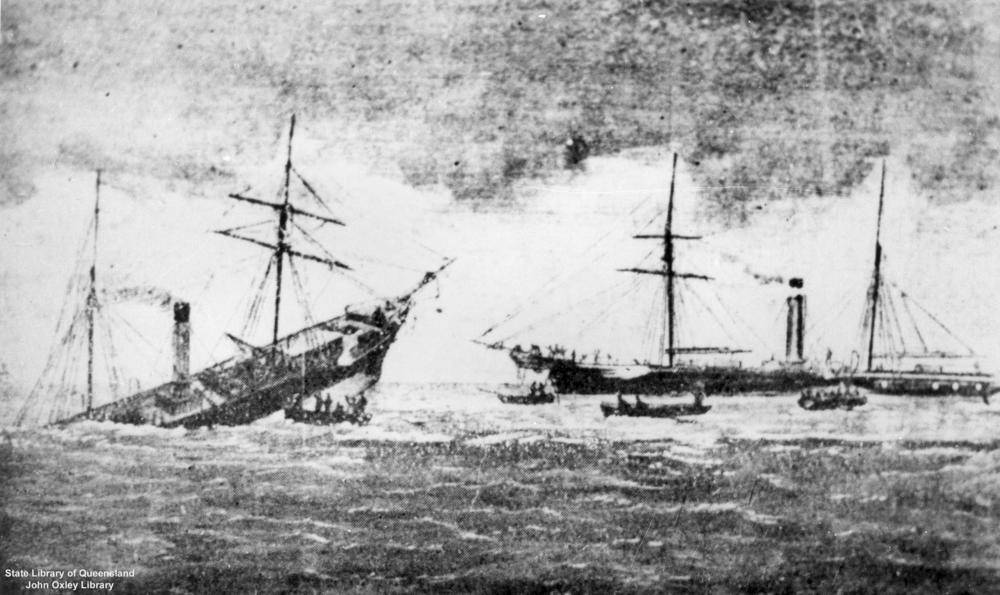
- Penola rescues survivors of City of Launceston

History

Australia
- Name: Penola
- Owner: Grice, Sumner & Co, Melbourne
- Port of registry: Melbourne, Victoria
- Builder: Laurence Hill & Company Port Glasgow
- Yard number: 45
- Launched: June 1863
- Refit: 1885
- Identification: 48408
- Notes: Notable for ramming and sinking the passenger steamer City of Launceston, 19 November 1865

Australia
- Name: Perth
- Namesake: Perth, Western Australia
- Owner: Adelaide Steamship Co. Ltd.
- Port of registry: Adelaide, South Australia
- In service: 1885
- Out of service: 17 September 1887
- Fate: Sank of Point Cloates, Western Australia, 17 September 1887

General characteristics
- Type: Cargo and passenger ship
- Tonnage: 350 GRT
- Length: 192 ft 1 in (58.55 m)
- Beam: 22 ft 5 in (6.83 m)
- Depth: 12 ft 6 in (3.81 m)
- Propulsion: 2 cylinder 80 hp (60 kW) steam engine
- Sail plan: Schooner-rigged on two masts
- Speed: 10 knots (19 km/h; 12 mph)

SS Perth, formerly SS Penola was a 350 GRT steamship operated by the Adelaide Steamship Company. Penola was notable for ramming and sinking SS City of Launceston, a passenger steamship, in Port Phillip Bay on 19 November 1865. Renamed Perth, the steamship ran aground and was wrecked off Point Cloates in Western Australia on 17 September 1887.

== See also ==
- List of shipwrecks in 1887
