= USS Killarney =

Patrol vessel of the United States Navy

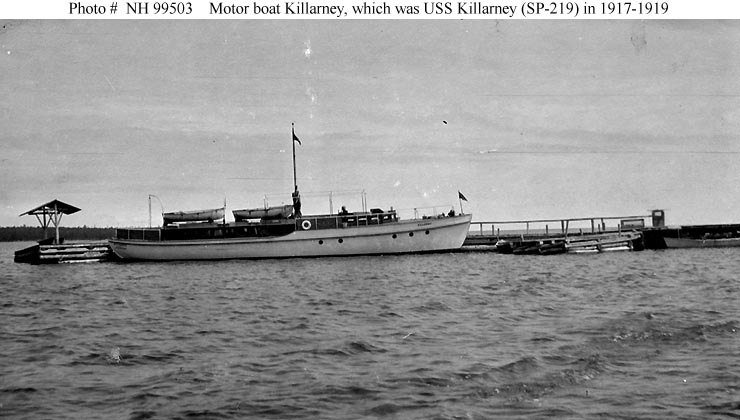
- Killarney as a civilian motorboat alongside a pier in the Great Lakes sometime between 1911 and 1917, prior to her U.S. Navy service.

History

United States
- Name: USS Killarney
- Namesake: Previous name retained
- Builder: Defoe Boat Works, Bay City, Michigan
- Completed: 1910
- Acquired: 30 April 1917
- Commissioned: 12 June 1917
- Out of service: Declared "inactive" 12 August 1919
- Stricken: 3 November 1919
- Fate: Sold 18 December 1919
- Notes: Operated as civilian motorboat Dora 1910-1911 and Killarney 1911-1917 and 1919-1926; Abandoned 1926

General characteristics
- Type: Patrol vessel
- Tonnage: 32 tons
- Length: 64 ft 10 in (19.76 m)
- Beam: 13 ft (4.0 m)
- Draft: 4 ft 6 in (1.37 m)
- Speed: 10 knots
- Armament: None

USS Killarney (SP-219) was a United States Navy patrol vessel in commission from 1917 to 1919.

Killarney was built as the civilian motorboat or motor yacht Dora in 1910 by the Defoe Boat Works at Bay City, Michigan. She was renamed Killarney in 1911. The U.S. Navy purchased Killarney from her owner, James H. McGillan of Green Bay, Wisconsin, on 30 April 1917 for World War I service as a patrol vessel. She was commissioned as USS Killarney (SP-219) on 12 June 1917.

Assigned to the "9th, 10th, and 11th Naval Districts"—at the time a single administrative entity made up of the 9th Naval District, 10th Naval District, and 11th Naval District—and based at Great Lakes, Illinois, Killarney served as a section patrol ship on the St. Mary's River in the Straits of Mackinac along the border between the United States and Canada during the summer and fall of 1917. She wintered in Detroit, Michigan, then continued her duties beginning in the spring of 1918 on Lake St. Clair, the Detroit River, and the St. Clair River, where she patrolled channels and regulated traffic. On 3 March 1919, Killarney was transferred to the Naval Training Camp at Detroit.

Killarney was declared inactive on 12 August 1919. Stricken from the Navy List on 3 November 1919, she was sold on 18 December 1919 to John J. Kiley of Detroit. She remained in civilian use until abandoned in 1926.
