= Banterer-class gunboat =

- HMS Wasp

Class overview
- Name: Banterer class
- Builders: Barrow Iron Shipbuilding; Pembroke Dockyard; Samuda Brothers
- Operators: Royal Navy
- Preceded by: Forester class
- Succeeded by: Albacore class (1883)
- Built: 1880–1882
- In commission: 1880–1907
- Planned: 13
- Completed: 11

General characteristics
- Type: Composite screw gunboat
- Displacement: 465 tons standard
- Length: 125 ft (38 m)
- Beam: 23 ft 6 in (7.16 m)
- Draught: 10 ft (3.0 m)
- Installed power: 440 ihp (330 kW)
- Propulsion: 2-cylinder horizontal compound-expansion steam engine; Single screw
- Speed: 9.5 kn (17.6 km/h)
- Crew: 60
- Armament: 2 × 6-inch/64-pdr (56cwt) muzzle-loading rifles; 2 × 3.75-inch/20-pdr BL guns; 2 × machine guns

The Banterer-class gunboat was a class of eleven gunboats mounting two 6-inch and two 4-inch guns, built for the Royal Navy between 1880 and 1892.

== Design ==
The Banterer class was designed by Nathaniel Barnaby, the Admiralty Director of Naval Construction. The ships were of composite construction, meaning that the keel, frames, stem and stern posts were of iron, while the hull was planked with timber. This had the advantage of allowing the vessels to be coppered, thus keeping marine growth under control, a problem that caused iron-hulled ships to be frequently docked. They were 125 feet (38 m) in length and displaced 465 tons. In appearance they were distinguishable from the preceding Forester class (also a Barnaby design) by their vertical stems.

=== Propulsion ===
Two-cylinder horizontal compound-expansion steam engines built by Barrow Iron Shipbuilding, Maudslay, Sons and Field or J. and G. Rennie provided 440 indicated horsepower through a single screw, sufficient for 9.5 knots (17.6 km/h; 10.9 mph).

=== Armament ===
Ships of the class were armed with two 6-inch 64-pounder muzzle-loading rifles (a conversion of the smoothbore 32-pounder 58 cwt gun) and two Armstrong 3.75-inch 20-pounder breech loading guns. A pair of machine guns was also fitted.

== Ships ==
Name	Ship builder	Launched	Fate
Redwing	Pembroke Dockyard	25 May 1880	Sold at Chatham on 4 April 1905
Grappler	Barrow Iron Shipbuilding	5 October 1880	Boom defence vessel in 1904. Sold to King, Garston for breaking on 14 May 1907
Wrangler	Barrow Iron Shipbuilding	5 October 1880	Coastguard in 1891. Boom defence vessel in 1903. Sold for breaking at Dover on 2 December 1919
Wasp	Barrow Iron Shipbuilding	5 October 1880	Wrecked off Tory Island, Ireland with loss of 52 lives on 22 September 1884, and the wreck sold in November 1910
Banterer	Barrow Iron Shipbuilding	2 November 1880	Sold to Harris, Bristol on 14 May 1907
Espoir	Barrow Iron Shipbuilding	2 November 1880	Tug in 1895. Yard craft in 1903. Sold in 1904
Bullfrog	Pembroke Dockyard	3 February 1881	Hulk in 1905. Renamed Egmont in March 1923, St Angelo on 1 July 1933 and sold in 1933
Cockchafer	Pembroke Dockyard	19 February 1881	Sold on 6 December 1905
Starling	Samuda Brothers, Poplar	19 April 1882	Coastguard in 1893. Sold as steam tug on 4 April 1905, renamed Stella Maris. Sunk by Halifax Explosion on 6 December 1917 but raised and refitted 1918
Stork	Samuda Brothers, Poplar	18 May 1882	Survey ship in 1887. Lent to Navy League as a training ship for boys at Hammersmith on 28 March 1893. Sold to Shaws of Kent, Rainham for breaking in 1950
Raven	Samuda Brothers, Poplar	18 May 1882	Diving tender in 1904. Lent as training ship in March 1913. Sold for breaking on 13 March 1925
