= Bramble-class gunboat (1886) =

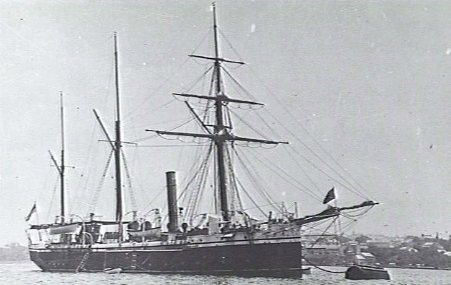
- HMS Lizard, c.1890.

Class overview
- Name: Bramble class
- Builders: Armstrong Mitchell; Harland & Wolff
- Operators: Royal Navy
- Preceded by: Albacore class (1883)
- Succeeded by: Pygmy class
- Built: 1886
- In commission: 1886 - 1924
- Completed: 4

General characteristics
- Type: Composite screw gunboat
- Displacement: 715 tons standard
- Length: 165 ft (50 m)
- Beam: 29 ft (8.8 m)
- Draught: 11 ft (3.4 m)
- Installed power: 1,000 ihp (750 kW); (Rattler 1,200 ihp (890 kW))
- Propulsion: Triple-expansion steam engine; Single screw
- Speed: 10 knots (19 km/h)
- Range: 2,500 nmi (4,600 km)
- Crew: 60
- Armament: 6 × 4-inch/25-pdr QF; 4 × machine guns

The Bramble-class gunboat was a class of four gunboats mounting six 4-inch guns, built for the Royal Navy in 1886. In 1887 the first three were reclassified as gunvessels.

== Design ==
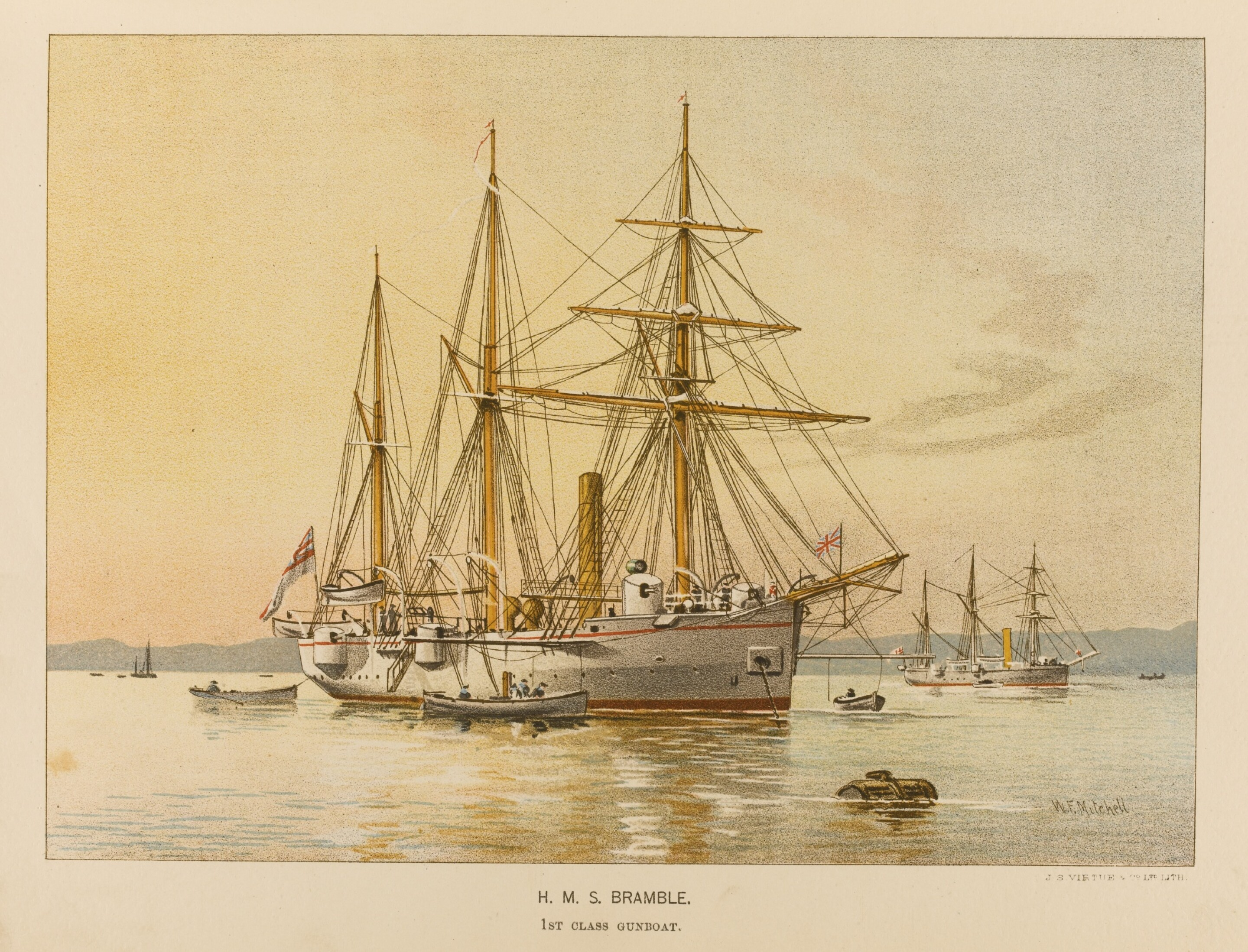
HMS Bramble, 1st class gunboat, by William Frederick Mitchell

The Bramble class was designed by William White. The ships were of composite construction, meaning that the iron keel, frames, stem and stern posts were of iron, while the hull was planked with timber. This had the advantage of allowing the vessels to be coppered, thus keeping marine growth under control, a problem that caused iron-hulled ships to be frequently docked. They were 165 feet (50 m) in length and displaced 715 tons.

=== Propulsion ===
Triple-expansion steam engines built by Hawthorn Leslie (Rattler), North East Marine Engineering (Wasp) and Harland & Wolff (Lizard and Bramble) provided 1,000 indicated horsepower (750 kW) (Rattler 1,200 ihp (890 kW)) through a single screw, sufficient for 10 knots (19 km/h; 12 mph).

=== Armament ===
Ships of the class were armed with six 4-inch 25-pounder quick-firing guns. Four machine guns were also fitted.

== Ships ==
Name	Ship Builder	Launched	Fate
Rattler	Armstrong Mitchell, Elswick	5 August 1886	Harbour service in 1910. Navigation school ship in September 1919, renamed Dryad. Sold for breaking in October 1924
Wasp	Armstrong Mitchell, Elswick	13 September 1886	Believed foundered with all hands after leaving Singapore for Shanghai on 10 September 1887
Lizard	Harland & Wolff, Belfast	27 November 1886	Sold at Sydney for breaking in 1905
Bramble	Harland & Wolff, Belfast	11 December 1886	Renamed Cockatrice in June 1896 and sold at Chatham on 3 April 1906
