= Forester-class gunboat =

- HMS Foxhound

Class overview
- Name: Forester-class gunboats
- Builders: William Doxford, Sunderland; Robert Napier & Sons, Govan; Earle’s Shipbuilding, Hull; Barrow Iron Shipbuilding; J & G Thomson, Govan
- Operators: Royal Navy
- Preceded by: Ariel class
- Succeeded by: Banterer class
- Cost: Hull £14,150, machinery £6,550 (Foxhound)
- Built: 1874–1877
- In commission: c.1874–1931
- Completed: 12
- Lost: 0

General characteristics
- Class & type: Composite gunboat
- Displacement: First 6 ships: 440 tons; Last 6 ships: 455 tons
- Length: 125 ft 0 in (38.1 m) pp
- Beam: 23 ft 6 in (7.2 m)
- Draught: 8 1/2–10 1/2 ft (2.6–3.2 m)
- Installed power: 60 nhp; 387–515 ihp (289–384 kW)
- Propulsion: 1 ×2-cylinder horizontal compound-expansion steam engine (Note: With the exception of Moorhen and Sheldrake, which received similarly rated single-expansion direct-acting steam engines); 2 × boilers; 1 × screw
- Sail plan: Three-masted barquentine rig
- Speed: 10 kn (19 km/h)
- Complement: 60
- Armament: 2 × 6-inch (150 mm) 64-pounder (56cwt) muzzle-loading rifles; 2 × 4-inch (100 mm) 20-pounder Armstrong breech loaders

The Forester-class gunboat was a class of 4-gun composite gunboats built for the Royal Navy between 1874 and 1877. Although half had been sold by 1890, the rest survived into the 20th century as coal hulks, base vessels and other secondary uses. Foxhound survived as a hulk on the Blackwall Reach of the Thames until 1975, when she was broken up. They were built of composite construction, that is, with iron keel, stem and stern posts, and iron framing, but planked with wood.

== Design and construction ==
Designed by Nathaniel Barnaby, Chief Constructor of the Royal Navy, the Forester-class gunboats were similar in every respect to the preceding Ariel-class gunboats. They were fitted with a 2-cylinder horizontal compound-expansion steam engine, although Moorhen and Sheldrake received a single-expansion direct-acting steam engine. These engines were rated for 60 nominal horsepower and generated between 387 ihp (289 kW) and 515 ihp (384 kW)). They were armed with two 6-inch (150 mm) 64-pounder (56cwt) muzzle-loading rifles and two 4-inch (100 mm) 20-pounder Armstrong breech loaders. All 4 guns were mounted on traversing carriages. All the ships of the class carried a three-masted barquentine rig.

== Ships ==
Name	Ship Builder	Launched	Fate
Cygnet	William Doxford & Sons, Sunderland	30 May 1874	Broken up in 1889
Express	William Doxford, Sunderland	16 July 1874	Sold in August 1889, sunk in October during a storm whilst under tow from HMNB Devonport to new owners
Contest	William Doxford, Sunderland	29 August 1874	Broken up at Devonport in 1889
Sheldrake	Robert Napier & Sons, Govan	3 July 1875	Drill ship, renamed Drake on 13 March 1888. Coastguard watch vessel, renamed WV29 in 1893. Renamed Drake in 1906. Sold to Meyer Isaacs on 3 April 1906
Mallard	Earle’s Shipbuilding, Hull	4 August 1875	Sold in August 1889
Moorhen	Robert Napier & Sons, Govan	13 September 1875	Sold in November 1888
Foxhound	Barrow Iron Shipbuilding	29 January 1877	Coastguard in 1886. Coal tug in 1897, renamed YC20. Sold as hulk Arabel in 1920, and remained in Blackwall Reach on the River Thames for 55 years. Broken up in 1975
Forward	Barrow Iron Shipbuilding	29 January 1877	Coal hulk in 1892. Sold in 1904
Firm	Earle’s Shipbuilding, Hull	14 February 1877	Sold to Cox for breaking up at Falmouth on 14 May 1907
Forester	Earle’s Shipbuilding, Hull	26 February 1877	Zulu War 1879. Coal hulk in 1894. Sold in 1904
Firebrand	J & G Thomson, Govan	30 April 1877	Sold in 1905, became mercantile Hoi Sin
Firefly	J & G Thomson, Govan	28 June 1877	Boom defence in 1904. Base ship on 3 April 1914, renamed Egmont. Renamed Firefly 1 in March 1923. Sold in May 1931
