= BL 4-inch Mk I–VI naval gun =

Ordnance BL 4-inch gun Mk I – Mk VI
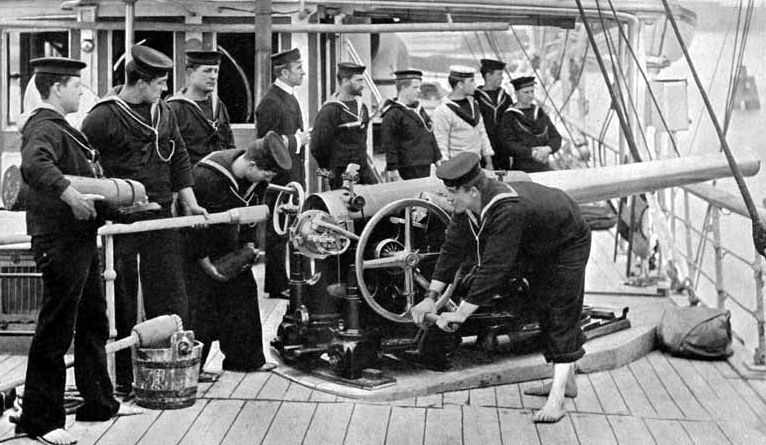
- Type: Naval gun
- Place of origin: United Kingdom

Service history
- In service: 1880s – 190?
- Used by: United Kingdom

Specifications
- Barrel length: Mk I 22.5cwt : 100 inches (2.540 m) bore (25 calibres); Mk II – VI : 108 inches (2.743 m) bore (27 calibres) 120 inches total
- Shell: 25 pounds (11.34 kg)
- Calibre: 4-inch (101.6 mm)
- Breech: 3-motion screw
- Muzzle velocity: Mk I 13cwt : 1,180 feet per second (360 m/s) Mk II – VI : 1,900 feet per second (580 m/s)
- Maximum firing range: Mk II-VI 7,700 yards (7,000 m)

The BL 4-inch gun Mk I – Mk VI were a family of early British breech-loading 4-inch naval guns.

== History ==
=== 13 cwt Mk I, 15 calibres ===
This was the first 4-inch BL gun. With its short (60-inch total) barrel it had a range of only 5,500 yards.

=== 22.5 cwt Mk I, 25 calibres ===
With its longer barrel (100 inch bore) Mk I had a range of 7,200 yards. Both early Mk I types were quickly withdrawn from service following the explosion of a similar BL 6 inch Mk II gun on board HMS Cordelia in June 1891. Mk I 22.5 cwt continued to be used for training.

=== 26 cwt Mks II - VI, 27 calibres ===
The improved 27-calibre Mk II gun and subsequent Marks, often referred to as 4 inch 26 cwt, replaced the early Mk I versions in service. The longer barrel (108 inch bore : 27 calibres) gave it a range of 7,700 yards.

Mk II guns and later Marks armed the following warships :

- HMS Inflexible as re-gunned in 1885
- HMS Bellerophon as re-gunned in 1885
- Pygmy-class composite screw gunboats of 1888
- Redbreast-class gunboats launched in 1889
- HMS Alexandra as re-gunned in 1891
- Alert-class sloops of 1894

The gun was succeeded in its class from 1895 by the QF 4-inch gun Mk I.

=== QFC 4-inch gun ===
A small number of these guns were converted to QF to use the same cartridges as the QF 4-inch gun. They were designated Mk I/IV, I/VI etc. depending on which Mark of BL 4-inch had been converted. All had a bore of 27.85 calibres after conversion, with a muzzle velocity of 2,177 ft/second.

== Surviving examples ==
- A gun from 1888 at Explosion! The Museum of Naval Firepower, Gosport from Victorian Forts and Artillery website
- A gun from HMS Gannet, mounted on top of Calshot Castle at the entrance to Southampton Water from Victorian Forts and Artillery website

== See also ==
- List of naval guns

== Bibliography ==
- Text Book of Gunnery, 1887. LONDON : PRINTED FOR HIS MAJESTY'S STATIONERY OFFICE, BY HARRISON AND SONS, ST. MARTIN'S LANE
- Text Book of Gunnery, 1902. LONDON : PRINTED FOR HIS MAJESTY'S STATIONERY OFFICE, BY HARRISON AND SONS, ST. MARTIN'S LANE
- Tony DiGiulian, British Early 4" (10.2 cm) Breech Loaders
