= Cousins (surname) =

Cousins is a surname. Notable people with the surname include:

- Alan William James Cousins (1903–2001), South African astronomer
- Ben Cousins (born 1978), Australian footballer
- Christopher Cousins (born 1960), American actor
- Dave Cousins (1940–2025), English musician, leader, singer and songwriter of Strawbs
- Dave Cousins (born 1977), American archer
- David Cousins (born 1942), British RAF Commander
- DeMarcus Cousins (born 1990), American basketball player
- Derryl Cousins (1946–2020), American baseball umpire
- Frank Cousins (American politician) (born 1958), American politician
- Frank Cousins (British politician) (1904–1986), British politician and trade union leader
- Henry Cousins (1827–1888), American politician and lawyer
- Isaiah Cousins (born 1994), American basketball player
- Jake Cousins (born 1994), American baseball player
- James Cousins (1873–1956), Irish-Indian writer, playwright, actor, critic, editor, teacher and poet
- James Cousins (footballer) (born 1998), Australian rules footballer
- Jim Cousins (born 1944), English politician
- Kirk Cousins (born 1988), American football player
- Kristina Cousins (born 1980), Canadian ice dancer
- Lethia Cousins Fleming (1876–1963), American suffragist, teacher, civil rights activist and politician
- L. S. Cousins (1942–2015), British scholar of Buddhism
- Lothan Cousins, Jamaican politician
- Lucy Cousins (born 1964), English author and illustrator
- Marshall Cousins (1869–1939), American politician, businessman, and historian
- Mark Cousins (disambiguation), several people
- Nick Cousins (born 1993), Canadian ice hockey player
- Norman Cousins (1915–1990), American writer and peace activist
- Dr. Oliver Cousins, fictional character
- Rae Cousins (born 1979/1980), American politician
- Richard Cousins (1959–2017), British businessman
- Richard Cousins (musician), American bassist
- Richard Cousins (footballer) (born 1962), Australian footballer
- Robin Cousins (born 1957), British figure skater
- Samuel Cousins (1801–1887), British mezzotinter
- Scott Cousins (born 1985), American baseball player
- Steven Cousins (born 1972), British figure skater
- Tina Cousins (born 1971), English musical artist
- Tom Cousins (1931–2025), American sports businessman

== See also ==
- Cousin (disambiguation)
- Cussen (surname)
- William Cousins (disambiguation)
