= Custance =

Custance is an English surname. Notable people with this name include:

- Arthur Custance (1910–1985), Canadian physiologist and writer
- A. I. Custance, pseudonym of Aleen Isobel Cust (1868–1937), pioneering female veterinary surgeon
- Craig Custance, sportswriter for The Athletic Detroit
- Henry Custance, British jockey.
- John D. Custance (1842–1923), agricultural scientist in South Australia
- Olive Custance (1874–1944), British poet and wife of Lord Alfred Douglas
- Reginald Custance (1847–1935), Royal Navy officer
- William Neville Custance (1811–1886), British Army officer
- Wilfred Custance (1884–1939), senior officer in the Royal Navy
