= Doveton Sturdee =

Royal Navy Admiral of the Fleet (1859–1925)

Admiral of the Fleet Sir Doveton Sturdee GCB Bt KCMG CVO
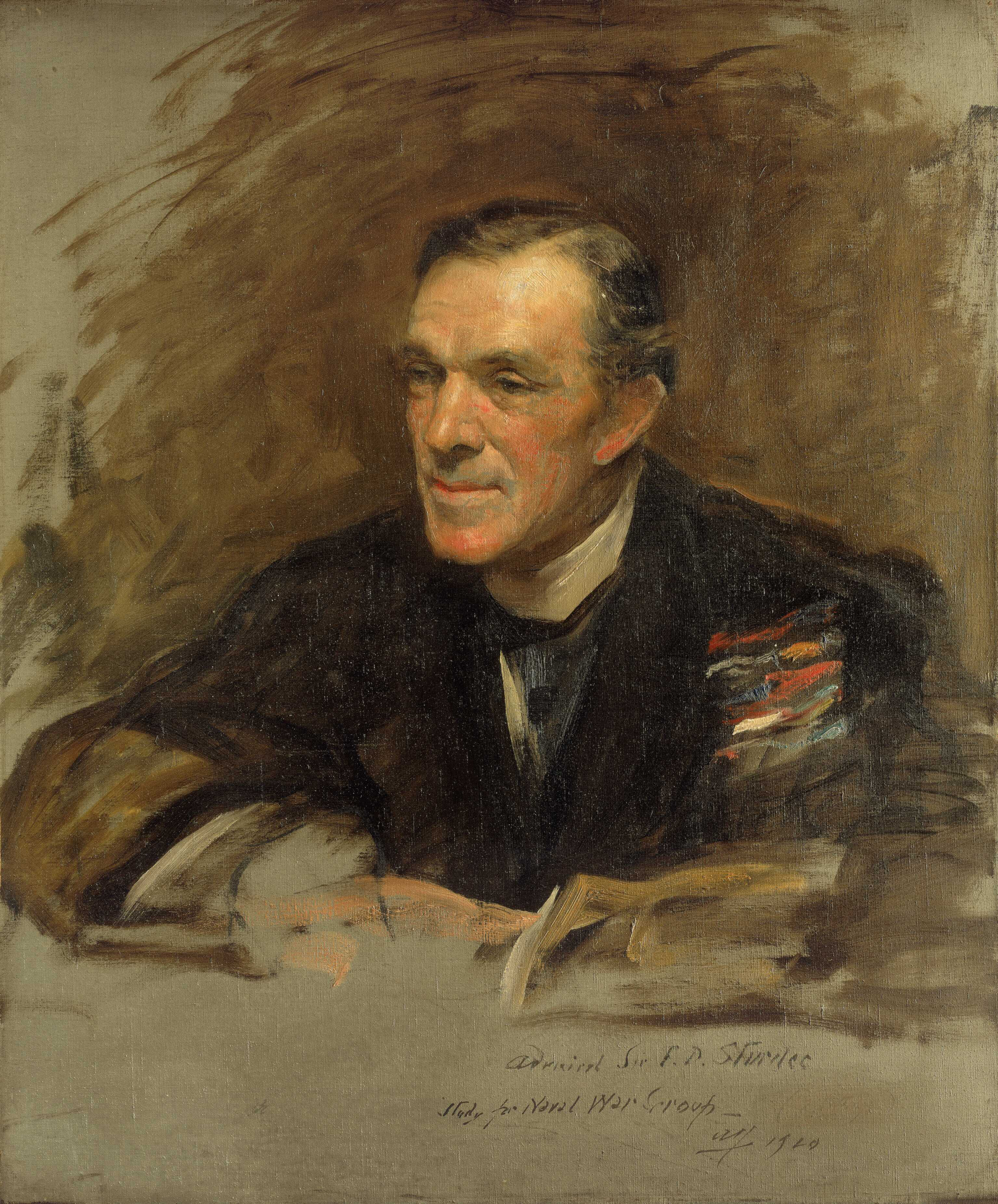
- Sketch of Sturdee for Naval Officers of World War I
- Born: 9 June 1859; Charlton, London, England
- Died: 7 May 1925 (aged 65); Camberley, Surrey, England
- Burial place: St Peter's Church, Frimley
- Military career
- Allegiance: United Kingdom
- Branch: Royal Navy
- Service years: 1871–1921
- Rank: Admiral of the Fleet
- Commands: Nore Command; 4th Battle Squadron; South Atlantic and Pacific Command; 2nd Cruiser Squadron; 3rd Cruiser Squadron; 1st Battle Squadron; HMS New Zealand; HMS King Edward VII; HMS Bulwark; HMS Bedford; HMS Minerva; HMS Porpoise
- Conflicts: Anglo-Egyptian War; First World War; Battle of the Falkland Islands; Battle of Jutland
- Awards: Knight Grand Cross of the Order of the Bath; Knight Commander of the Order of St Michael and St George; Commander of the Royal Victorian Order

Admiral of the Fleet Sir Frederick Charles Doveton Sturdee, 1st Baronet (9 June 1859 – 7 May 1925) was a Royal Navy officer. After training as a torpedo officer, he commanded two different cruisers and then three different battleships before becoming commander of the 1st Battle Squadron of the Home Fleet. He went on to command the 3rd Cruiser Squadron and then the 2nd Cruiser Squadron.

Just before the start of the First World War Sturdee became Chief of War Staff at the Admiralty. In November 1914 the Royal Navy suffered a serious defeat at the Battle of Coronel. In response Sturdee, recently sacked from his job at the Admiralty, was sent to the South Atlantic to seek out the German squadron, commanded by Graf Maximilian von Spee, which had caused the damage at Coronel. On 8 December 1914, while coaling at Stanley, Sturdee encountered von Spee and the subsequent action became known as the Battle of the Falkland Islands. Von Spee, finding that he was engaged with a superior force, was forced to flee. In the course of the pursuit Sturdee's forces sank almost the entire German squadron. Only one light cruiser escaped but she was hunted down in March 1915.

In the closing years of the war Sturdee served as commander of the 4th Battle Squadron in the Grand Fleet and then as Commander-in-Chief, The Nore.

== Early life ==
Born the son of Captain Frederick Sturdee RN and Anna Frances Sturdee (née Hodson) in Charlton, Kent, Sturdee was educated at the Royal Naval School at New Cross and then joined the Royal Navy as a cadet in the training ship HMS Britannia on 15 July 1871. Promoted to midshipman on 19 July 1873, he was appointed to the frigate HMS Undaunted, flagship of the China Station in 1876. Promoted to sub-lieutenant on 9 June 1878 and to lieutenant on 7 February 1880, he joined the brig HMS Martin at Portsmouth in May 1880 and then transferred to the torpedo depot ship HMS Hecla in the Mediterranean Fleet in February 1881. He took part in the bombardment of Alexandria in July 1882 during the Anglo-Egyptian War.

== Early naval career ==
After completing a course on torpedoes at HMS Vernon Sturdee became a torpedo officer on HMS Bellerophon, flagship of the North America and West Indies Station, in 1886 before returning to HMS Vernon as an instructor in 1889. Promoted to commander on 30 June 1893, he transferred to the Admiralty as a torpedo specialist in the Directorate of Naval Ordnance. He became commanding officer of the cruiser HMS Porpoise on the Australian Station in November 1897 and became involved in managing the tensions with Germany and the United States over the Samoan Islands in 1899. His handling of this situation, which involved a tense stand-off with the German representatives, earned him his promotion to captain on 30 June 1899, and his appointment as a Companion of the Order of St Michael and St George in the 1900 New Year Honours list on 1 January 1900 (he was invested in person by Queen Victoria at Windsor Castle on 1 March 1900).

=== Senior office ===
Sturdee returned to the Admiralty as assistant director of naval intelligence (foreign division) from 1 January 1900, serving as such until 16 October 1902, when he was appointed to command of the protected cruiser HMS Minerva. Appointed a member, 4th class, of the Royal Victorian Order (MVO) on 21 April 1903 during King Edward's visit to Malta, he became commanding officer of the armoured cruiser HMS Bedford in the Home Fleet in November 1903. He went on to be commanding officer of the battleship HMS Bulwark and Chief of Staff to the Commander-in-Chief of the Mediterranean Fleet (Lord Charles Beresford) in May 1905. Advanced to Commander of the Royal Victorian Order on 16 April 1906, he became commanding officer of the battleship HMS King Edward VII and then of the battleship HMS New Zealand in a new role as Chief of Staff of the Channel Fleet in 1907. He was appointed an aide-de-camp to the King on 26 October 1907. He was promoted to rear-admiral on 12 September 1908.

Sturdee wrote (9 March 1909) to Jack Sandars, an adviser to the Opposition leader Arthur Balfour, expressing doubt that the 10,000 yard range of HMS Dreadnought’s 12-inch guns would be of much use, as visibility did not extend more than 6,000 yards in the North Sea on 25 days out of 30. He appears at that time to have favoured caution before committing too many resources to all-big-gun battleships. Historian Nicholas Lambert writes that “a self-proclaimed naval intellectual, Sturdee was the disciple of Reginald Custance [who had been his boss as Director of Naval Intelligence] and former flag captain to Lord Charles Beresford. Sturdee’s pomposity and arrogance combined with his close association with Beresford earned him the enmity of Admiral Sir John Fisher, who tried hard to sabotage his career." Although no longer First Sea Lord, Fisher wrote (1 Feb 1910) to First Lord of the Admiralty Reginald McKenna urging him not to appoint Sturdee Third Sea Lord. He became Rear Admiral commanding the 1st Battle Squadron of the Home Fleet, with his flag in the battleship HMS St. Vincent, in 1910.

Sturdee became President of the Submarine Committee of the Admiralty in early 1911. He benefited from the decision by the incoming First Lord of the Admiralty, Winston Churchill, in late 1911 to pass over twenty admirals to promote John Jellicoe to command of the 2nd Battle Squadron, freeing up a promotion logjam. Sturdee became commander of the 3rd Cruiser Squadron of the Home Fleet, with his flag in the cruiser HMS Shannon, in December 1911. He went on to become commander of the 2nd Cruiser Squadron of the Home Fleet, with his flag in Shannon again, in 1913. He was appointed a Knight Commander of the Order of the Bath on 3 June 1913.

== First World War ==
=== Chief of War Staff ===
Sturdee was promoted to vice-admiral on 13 December 1913. By the end of 1913 Sturdee was considered for the position of Chief of Admiralty War Staff. Draft notes in Churchill’s papers suggest that he may have been the second choice after Prince Louis of Battenberg had given what Nicholas Lambert describes as “uncharacteristically fierce resistance” to appointing his former superior Reginald Custance. Heathcote states that he took office as Chief of War Staff at the Admiralty in July 1914.

On 24 July 1914 Sturdee submitted two memos deploring the new planned “HMS Polyphemus” class, a semi-submerged torpedo cruiser armed with eight torpedoes. There had been an argument about the naval estimates at the start of 1914, with Liberal opinion, including Chancellor of the Exchequer David Lloyd George, objecting to ever-escalating naval expenditure, especially with a general election due within a year or so. Churchill’s motives were purely financial, aiming to save up to £900,000 off the naval budget, and his plans had been outlined in memos on 1 and 14 June 1914. He aimed to substitute 14-16 submarines for a planned "HMS Resistance" and 6-8 Polyphemuses for a planned "HMS Agincourt" (the name was reused for a different battleship), and to cease all destroyer building except for two or three large ones for use as flotilla leaders, and build submarines instead. Sturdee criticised the high cost of the Polyphemuses, as well as their low freeboard (making them unusable in rough seas) and vulnerability to enemy destroyers. Christopher Bell writes that, contrary to Nicholas Lambert's claims, no final decision had been reached on “substitution” (of submersible craft for battleships) prior to the outbreak of war.

On 9 August 1914, with Britain now at war with Germany, Churchill instructed Battenberg and Sturdee to draw up plans to seize Ameland in the Dutch Frisian Islands. This was the genesis of the eventual plan to land at Borkum (as a possible prelude to seizing the Kiel Canal and sending a British fleet into the Baltic. Bell gives the date of Churchill's Ameland instruction as 8 August in his text then 9 August in a footnote.

Sturdee objected (16 August 1914) to the Order in Council about blocking trade with Germany through neutral countries. He doubted the “political expediency of adopting an attitude the practical efficacy of which is very doubtful, and which I think is just as sure to raise trouble with neutrals”. Admiral Edmond Slade recorded similar thoughts on 18 August.

Sturdee wrote two “dismissive minutes” (25 September 1914) about the Cabinet’s wishes to mine the eastern North Sea as far south as Rotterdam and Flushing. Nicholas Lambert comments that Sturdee “a self-proclaimed naval theorist of the Mahanian school, was notorious for his monochromatic view of sea power and his dogmatic insistence that the primary objective must remain decisive victory in a fleet engagement”. Captain Herbert Richmond complained in his diary that “he produced the old, stale claptrap that what we want to do is not to keep the enemy in but to get him out & fight”. While Churchill was away at Antwerp Sturdee had persuaded the First Sea Lord Prince Louis of Battenberg to join him in a joint statement that it was not British policy to lay mines (the document is not in the archives, according to Nicholas Lambert – it is only mentioned in the 1 October diary of Captain Philip Dumas, the “Director of Mining”). Churchill (1 October) ordered the Admiralty to draw up a schedule for mining the North Sea, reconfirming instructions given by Prime Minister H.H. Asquith while he was away at Antwerp.

In Nicholas Lambert's view Sturdee shared some of the blame for Admiralty blunders for which Churchill was blamed by the press – the escape of the Goeben and Breslau, and the loss of the Aboukir, Cressy and Hogue. Christopher Bell writes that Churchill, who had vainly urged that the three cruisers be stationed more safely further away from the German fleet, was unfairly blamed in the press. He had appointed Battenberg and Sturdee and so bears some responsibility for their errors, but nonetheless the fault for the loss of the three cruisers lies with them. On 1 November 1914 the Royal Navy suffered a demoralising defeat when it lost two armoured cruisers commanded by Christopher Cradock at the Battle of Coronel. In The World Crisis (his First World War memoirs, published in the 1920s) Churchill later put the blame for Coronel on Cradock (to the displeasure of his surviving relatives); in Bell's view he should have been more critical of Battenberg and Sturdee for failure to transmit clear orders.

Admiral Fisher, returning as First Sea Lord in Battenberg's place, sacked Sturdee (4 November) – he was “the first to go” in Nicholas Lambert’s words. Stephen Roskill (in Man of Secrets, his biography of Maurice Hankey) described this as personal “headhunting” by Fisher. However Nicholas Lambert comments that Captain Philip Dumas wrote in his diary on the day of Fisher’s return (30 October) that “the great hope here is for Sturdee & Leveson to go”. “Blinker” Hall also thought similarly.

=== South Atlantic ===
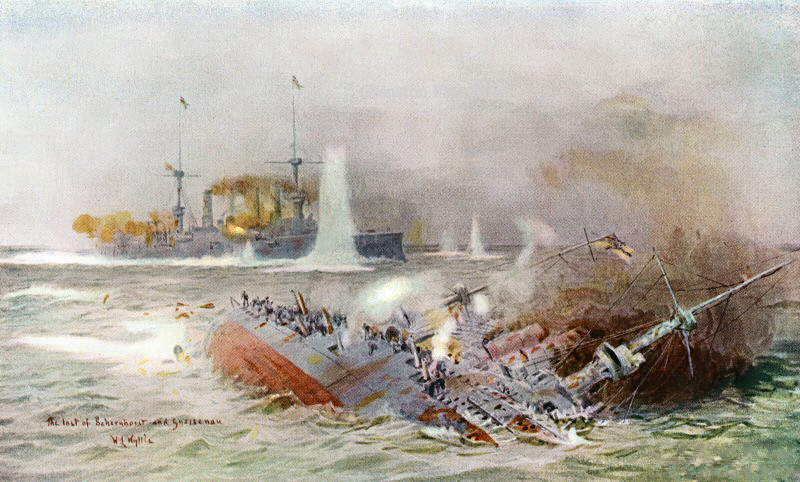
Battle of the Falkland Islands by William Lionel Wyllie. Scharnhorst rolls over and sinks while Gneisenau continues to fight

Admiral Lord Fisher sent a squadron commanded by Sturdee, with his flag in the battlecruiser HMS Invincible, to the South Atlantic to seek out the German squadron, commanded by Graf Maximilian von Spee, which had won the Battle of Coronel. Sturdee was given command at Winston Churchill’s insistence, because he did not at that time wish him to be scapegoated for Admiralty failings. Halpern comments that the decision was compounded by the fact that Fisher "detested" Sturdee and wanted to remove him from the Admiralty.

On 8 December 1914, while coaling at Stanley, Sturdee encountered von Spee and the subsequent action became known as the Battle of the Falkland Islands. Von Spee, finding that he was engaged with a superior force, was forced to flee. In the course of the pursuit Sturdee's forces sank almost the entire German squadron, including the armoured cruisers, SMS Scharnhorst and SMS Gneisenau. Only the light cruiser SMS Dresden escaped but she was hunted down in March 1915. Lambert comments that it was “remarkable fortune” that von Spee ran into Sturdee's force refuelling at Port Stanley.

=== Grand Fleet ===
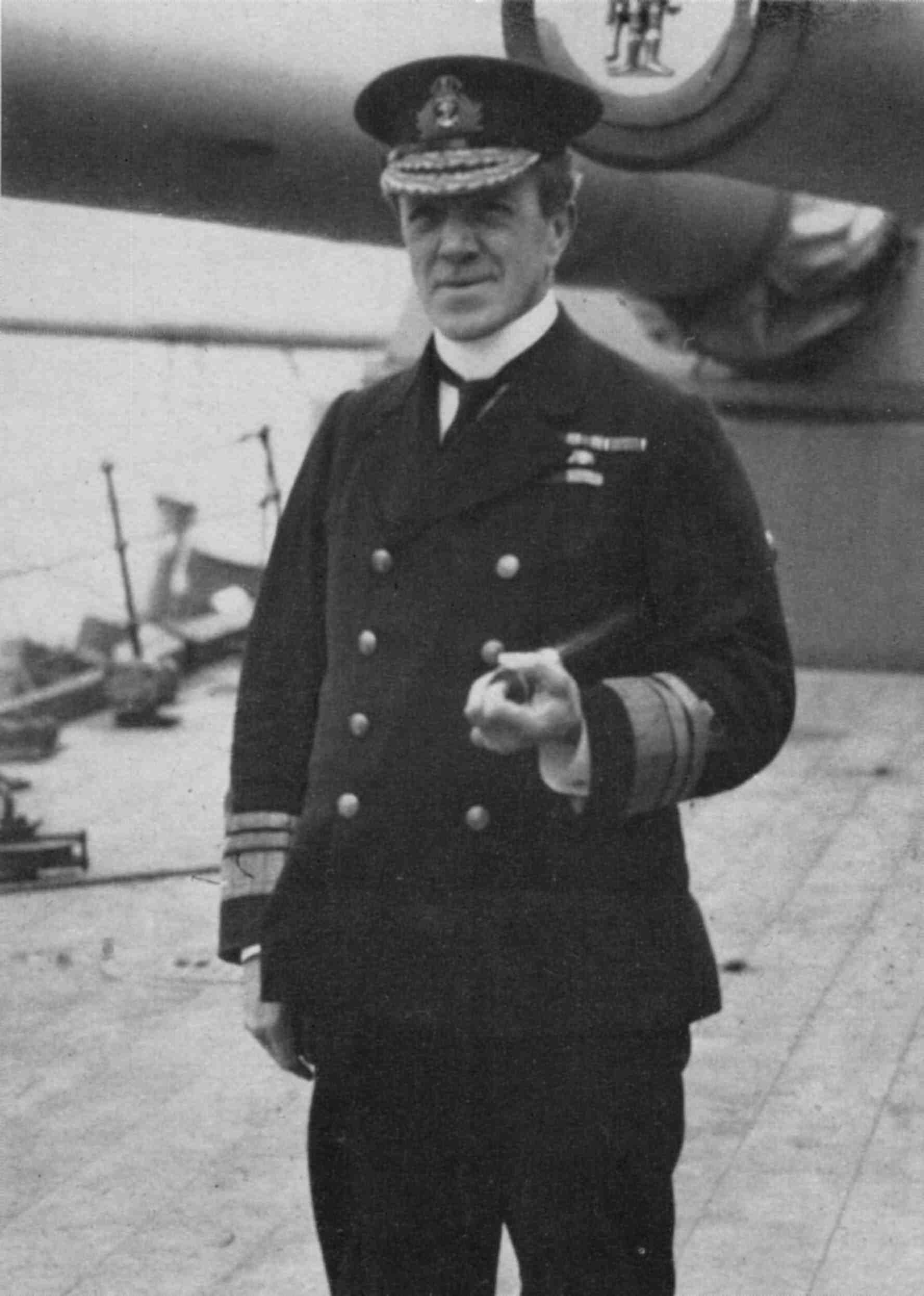
Sturdee on board HMS Hercules commanding 4th Battle Squadron at the Battle of Jutland

Sturdee became commander of the 4th Battle Squadron in the Grand Fleet, with his flag in the battleship HMS Benbow, in January 1915.

George Riddell commented in his Diary (29 April 1915) that Churchill, now under renewed press attack for the failed naval attack on the Dardanelles, showed him papers proving that he was not to blame for the loss of the three cruisers (Aboukir, Cressy and Hogue) and the Battle of Coronel the previous autumn. They were interrupted by Admiral Fisher coming into room and insisting to Churchill that “a person of importance wishes to see you” – Riddell suspected that Fisher had been summoned by Churchill’s Private Secretary James Masterton-Smith to stop Churchill showing him classified papers. Churchill did not go immediately but commented that Battenberg had been “very lethargic” and Sturdee “not a good Chief of Staff. He is a good fighting admiral but not a clever man”. Fisher resigned the following month, bringing down the Liberal Government and causing Churchill's removal from the Admiralty.

Sturdee was created a baronet on 15 March 1916 with the title "of the Falkland Is." Sturdee directed his squadron at the Battle of Jutland in May 1916. He was advanced to Knight Commander of the Order of St Michael and St George on 31 May 1916 and awarded the Cross of Commander of the French Legion of Honour on 15 September 1916.

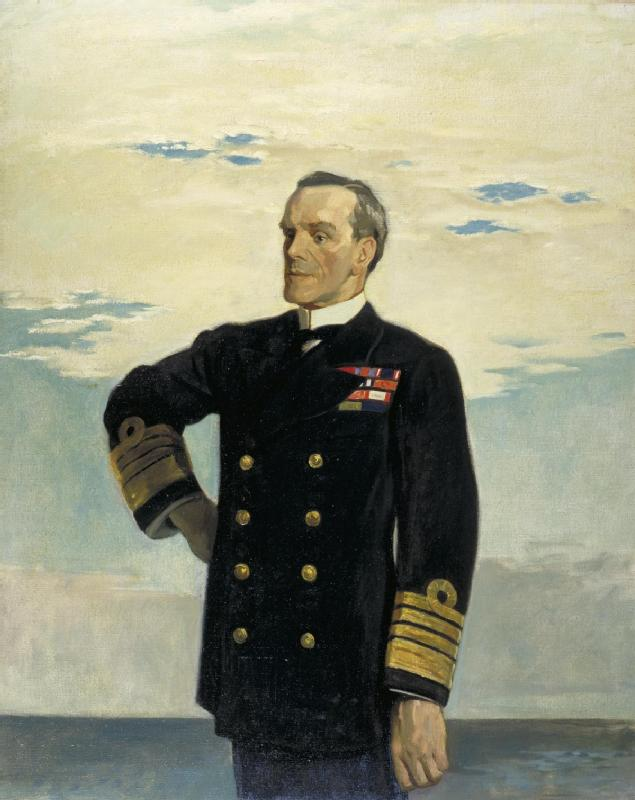
Frederick Charles Doveton Sturdee, 1918, by Glyn Philpot

Lord Sydenham of Combe (4 October 1916) and Reginald Custance (9 October 1916) complained in letters to The Times that Churchill’s recent statements (Churchill was out of office at the time) that the German High Seas Fleet was effectively blockaded and that surplus forces should be used in offensive operations (similar to the views of naval theorist Julian Corbett) ignored the importance of seeking a decisive victory over the German Fleet. Sturdee also complained in a private memorandum (24 Nov 1916) that Churchill’s policy was “the exact reverse of what he advocated when in office and expressed in public speeches”. Historian Christopher Bell thinks this not quite fair – Churchill had advocated risking old, near-obsolete ships in the attack on the Dardanelles but had never suggested weakening Britain’s superiority over Germany in the North Sea. In articles (The London Magazine December 1916 and January 1917) and in a Commons speech (21 February 1917) Churchill continued to argue that seeking a major naval victory over Germany was unrealistic but that Germany was effectively blockaded even if such a blockade now took place from bases further away from the enemy than in Napoleonic times.

Promoted to full admiral on 17 May 1917, Sturdee was appointed Grand Officer of the Italian Order of Saints Maurice and Lazarus on 11 August 1917, and became Commander-in-Chief, The Nore in March 1918. He was promoted to Admiral of the Fleet on his retirement on 5 July 1921 and advanced to Knight Grand Cross of the Order of the Bath on 1 January 1921. He was President of the Society for Nautical Research (1922–1925).

== Personal life ==
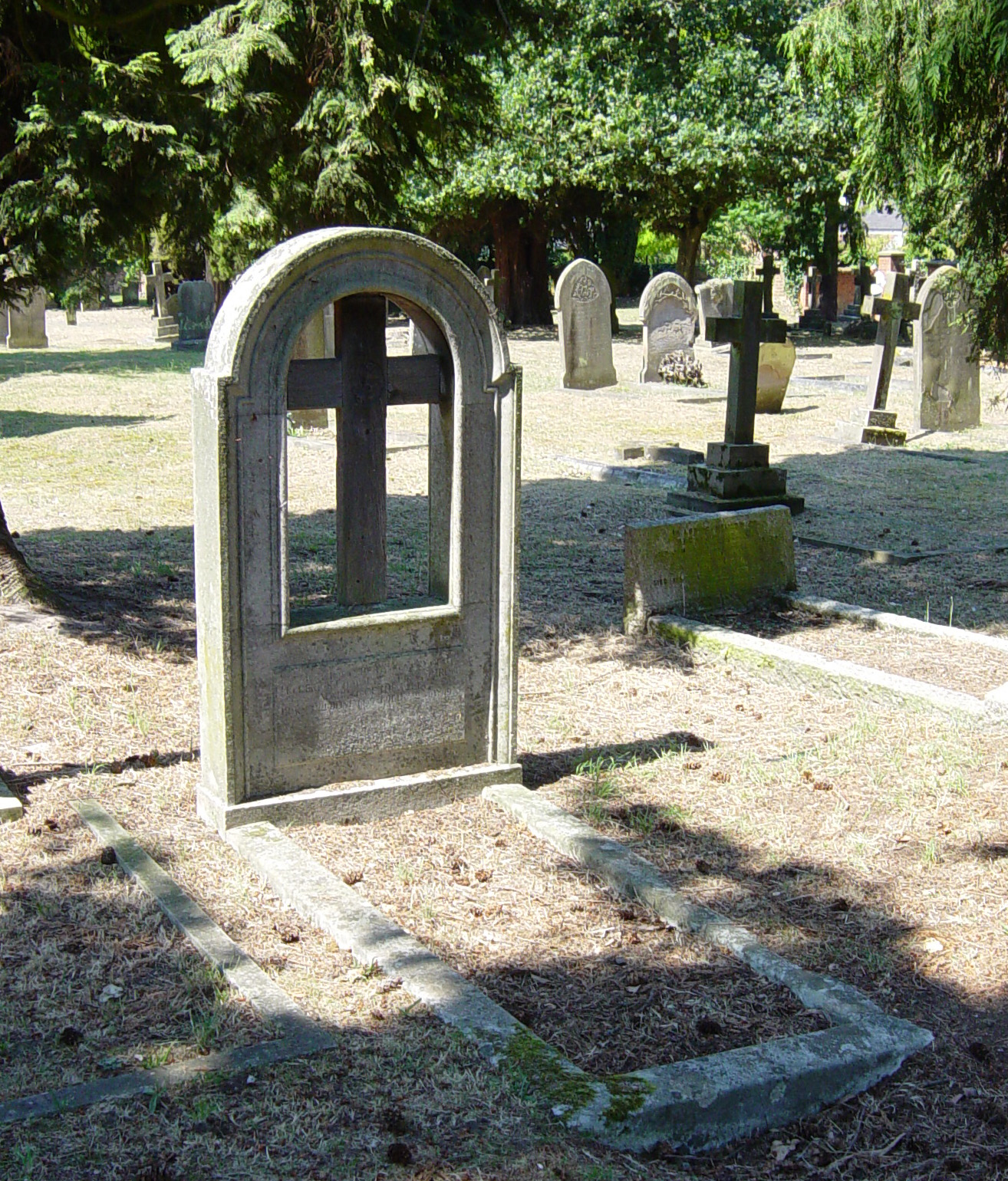
Sir Doveton Sturdee's gravestone in the churchyard of St Peter's Church, Frimley.

In 1882 Sturdee married Marion Andrews (died 1940): they had a son and a daughter.

Sturdee retired to Camberley, in Surrey, and died there on 7 May 1925. He was buried in the churchyard of St Peter's Church in nearby Frimley. His gravestone incorporates a cross made from the timbers of Nelson's ship, HMS Victory. His grandson William Staveley and grandson-in-law Edward Ashmore were also Admirals of the Fleet.

== Arms ==
Coat of arms of Doveton Sturdee
Crest Issuant out of a naval crown an arm in armour holding in the hand a spiked club proper. Escutcheon Gyronny of eight Argent and Gules on a chief Azure an anchor fessewise Or. Motto Firmus Maneo

== See also ==
- Lieutenant General Sir Vernon Sturdee, his nephew

== Sources ==
- Bell, Christopher (2012). Churchill and Sea Power. Oxford: Oxford University Press. ISBN 978-0-19969-357-3.
- Bell, Christopher (2017). Churchill and the Dardanelles. Oxford: Oxford University Press. ISBN 978-0-19870-254-2.
- Halpern, Paul G. (1994). A Naval History of World War I. Annapolis, Maryland: Naval Institute Press. ISBN 1-55750-352-4.
- Heathcote, Tony (2002). The British Admirals of the Fleet 1734 – 1995. Pen & Sword. ISBN 0-85052-835-6.
- Lambert, Nicholas (2002) [1999]. Sir John Fisher's Naval Revolution. Columbia, SC: University South Carolina Press. ISBN 978-1-57003-492-3.
- Lambert, Nicholas (2012). Planning Armageddon: British Economic Warfare and the First World War. Cambridge Massachusetts: Harvard University Press; 1st Edition. ISBN 978-0-67406-149-1.
- Massie, Robert K. (2004). Castles of Steel: Britain, Germany, and the Winning of the Great War at Sea. London: Jonathan Cape. ISBN 0-224-04092-8.
- Murphy, Hugh & Derek J. Oddy (2010), The Mirror of the Seas; A Centenary History of the Society for Nautical Research London, Society for Nautical Research. ISBN 978-0-902387-01-0

Military offices
Preceded by Sir George Callaghan	Commander-in-Chief, The Nore; 1918–1921	Succeeded by Sir Hugh Evan-Thomas
Baronetage of the United Kingdom
New creation	Baronet (of the Falkland Islands); 1916–1925	Succeeded by Lionel Sturdee
