= Cusden =

Cusden is a surname. Notable people with the surname include:

- Phoebe Cusden (1887–1981), British trade unionist, educator, peace campaigner, and politician
- Simon Cusden (born 1985), British cricketer

== See also ==
- Cussen
