= Cousins (disambiguation) =

A cousin is the child of one's aunt or uncle, or a more distant relative who shares a common ancestor. Cousins may also refer to:

== Film and television ==
- Les Cousins (film), 1959 French film directed by Claude Chabrol
- Cousins (1989 film), American film directed by Joel Schumacher
- Cousins (2014 film), Indian film directed by Vysakh
- Cousins (2019 film), Brazilian film
- Cousins (2021 film), New Zealand film directed by Ainsley Gardiner and Briar Grace-Smith
- Cousins (TV series), a BBC documentary
- Leonel and Marco Salamanca, fictional hitmen in the TV series Breaking Bad referred to as "The Cousins" or "The Twins"

== Music ==
- Cousins (band), a Canadian garage rock band

=== Songs ===
- "Cousins" (Vampire Weekend song)
- "Cousins" (Kanye West song)
- Cousins, song by King Von featuring JusBlow600

== Other uses ==
- Cousins (surname), people with the surname Cousins
- The Cousins (painting), an 1852 painting by Franz Xaver Winterhalter
- Cousins, an 1879 novel by Lucy Bethia Walford

== See also ==
- Cousin (disambiguation)
- Cousins, Alberta (disambiguation)
- Cousins Subs, a US sandwich chain
- Couzens (disambiguation)
