= HMS Resistance =

Four ships of the Royal Navy have borne the name HMS Resistance. A fifth was planned but never built:

- HMS Resistance (1782) was a 44-gun fifth rate launched in 1782, which blew up on 24 July 1798 in the Bangka Strait, South East Sumatra in an unexplained ammunition explosion.
- HMS Resistance (1801) was a 36-gun fifth rate launched in 1801 and wrecked in 1803.
- HMS Resistance (1805) was a 38-gun fifth rate launched in 1805. She was converted into a troopship in 1842 and was broken up in 1858.
- HMS Resistance (1861) was a Defence-class ironclad launched in 1861. She was used as a target ship from 1885, and was sold in 1898 but foundered in 1899. She was raised and scrapped in 1900.
- HMS Resistance was to have been a Revenge-class battleship. She was ordered in 1914, but was cancelled later that year. The cancellation, proposed by Winston Churchill (First Lord of the Admiralty) in memoranda of 1 and 14 June 1914, was intended to shave around £900,000 off that year's naval estimates, which had met with resistance from leading members of the ruling Liberal Party. It had been proposed to build submarines in place of Resistance and in place of all but two or three of that year's planned destroyers, and a new type of submersible torpedo-craft, the Polyphemus class, in place of another planned battleship HMS Agincourt (the name was reused for a different ship).

== Private ships called the Resistance ==
In 1605, a ship called the Resistance was intended to join the fleet taking Charles Howard, 1st Earl of Nottingham, as ambassador to Spain. However, although funded by the crown for this sailing, it was discovered that the Resistance, owned by Robert Mansell, John Trevor, and Phineas Pett, had transported a cargo lead to Spain instead.

== Book ==
- Lambert, Nicholas (2002) [1999]. Sir John Fisher's Naval Revolution. Columbia, SC: University South Carolina Press. ISBN 978-1-57003-492-3.
