= Queen Elizabeth-class battleship =

Class of British battleships

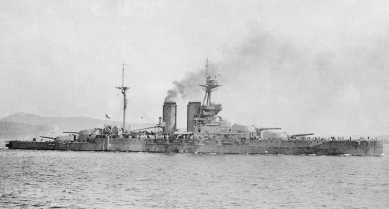
- Queen Elizabeth in her original configuration at Lemnos, 24 April 1915

Class overview
- Name: Queen Elizabeth class
- Builders: Armstrong Whitworth; Fairfields; Devonport Dockyard; John Brown & Co.; Portsmouth Dockyard
- Operators: Royal Navy
- Preceded by: Iron Duke class
- Succeeded by: Revenge class
- In commission: 1914–1947
- Planned: 6
- Completed: 5
- Cancelled: 1
- Lost: 1
- Scrapped: 4

General characteristics (as built)
- Type: Dreadnought battleship
- Displacement: 32,590 long tons (33,110 t) (normal); 33,260 long tons (33,790 t) (Deep load)
- Length: 643 ft 9 in (196.2 m) (o/a)
- Beam: 90 ft 7 in (27.6 m)
- Draught: 33 ft 7 in (10.2 m) (deep load)
- Installed power: 24 water-tube boilers; 75,000 shp (56,000 kW)
- Propulsion: 4 shafts; 2 steam turbine sets
- Speed: 24 knots (44 km/h; 28 mph)
- Range: 5,000 nmi (9,260 km; 5,750 mi) at 12 knots (22 km/h; 14 mph)
- Complement: 923–951 (as completed); 1,249–1,262 (as flagships, 1920)
- Armament: 4 × twin 15 in (381 mm) guns; 12, 14, or 16 × single 6 in (152 mm) guns; 2 × single 3 in (76 mm) AA guns; 4 × 21 in (533 mm) torpedo tubes
- Armour: Waterline belt: 13 in (330 mm); Deck: 1–3 in (25–76 mm); Barbettes: 7–10 in (178–254 mm); Gun turrets: 11–13 in (279–330 mm); Conning tower: 13 in (330 mm)

The Queen Elizabeth-class battleships were a group of five dreadnoughts built for the Royal Navy during the 1910s. These battleships were superior in firepower, protection and speed to their Royal Navy predecessors of the Iron Duke class as well as preceding German classes such as the König class. The corresponding Bayern-class ships were generally considered competitive, although the Queen Elizabeth class were 2 knots (3.7 km/h) faster and outnumbered the German class 5:2. The Queen Elizabeths are generally considered the first fast battleships of their day.

The Queen Elizabeths were the first battleships to be armed with 15-inch (381 mm) guns, and were described in the 1919 edition of Jane's Fighting Ships as "the most successful type of capital ship yet designed." They saw much service in both world wars. Barham was lost to a U-boat attack in 1941, but the others survived the wars and were scrapped in the late 1940s.

== Background and design ==
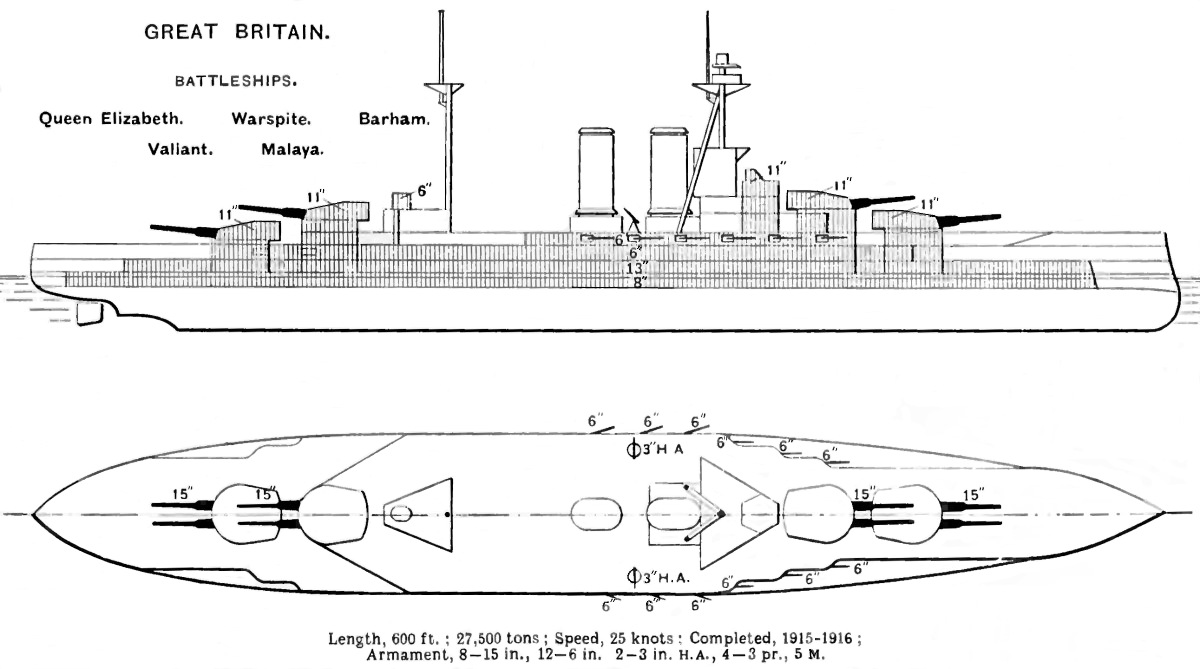
Right plan and elevation drawing from Brassey's Naval Annual 1923; the shaded areas represent the ships' armour plating

The early design history of the Queen Elizabeth class is not well known because not many records have survived in the files of the Admiralty. When Winston Churchill became First Lord of the Admiralty in October 1911, the ships of the 1911–1912 Naval Programme, the four Iron Duke-class battleships and the battlecruiser HMS Tiger were being ordered and preliminary design work had begun on the new class of battleships scheduled for the 1912–1913 Naval Programme. Each class received its own alphabetical designation with the Iron Dukes being MIV, the fourth major iteration of Design M. Presumably the improved 1912–1913 ships were Design N, but no details of it have been found in Admiralty records. The letter O was not used during this time. Naval historian Norman Friedman believes that Design P was a slow ship armed with ten 15-inch (381 mm) guns based on a passing reference in the official history of naval construction during the First World War that such a ship was a precursor to the Queen Elizabeths.

Churchill and Admiral of the Fleet Lord Fisher, the retired First Sea Lord, corresponded at length during this time with Fisher advocating for a fast (probably 28-knot (52 km/h; 32 mph)) ship armed with eight guns and nearly as well armoured as a battleship, something that he sometimes called a "super-Lion", referring to the battlecruiser HMS Lion. Friedman believes that the Director of Naval Construction (DNC), Sir Philip Watts, designated Fisher's concept as Design Q with a slower version being the Queen Elizabeth class as Design R. "The destruction of papers may thus have concealed the reality that instead of being a spectacular advance on previous battleships, the Queen Elizabeths were a slow version of a ship which Fisher and probably Churchill badly wanted. Much of the fragmentary evidence for the fast ship is to be found in Fisher's letters to Churchill."

The tactical mission of these ships is portrayed as being fast enough to manoeuvre to catch the head of the enemy's battleline and concentrate fire against it, but they were actually intended to prevent the German battlecruisers, which were more heavily armoured than their British equivalents, from doing the same to the British fleet. A memo from Churchill to Rear-Admiral Gordon Moore, Third Sea Lord, on 27 October 1912, stated "the speed and power of the Queen Elizabeths ... is sufficient to protect the battle fleet against any turning movement by German battlecruisers.

Influenced by Fisher, Churchill ordered development of the 42-calibre BL 15-inch Mk I gun using the codename "14inch Experimental" in January 1912. This was a risky decision as development of new heavy guns and their turrets was normally a multi-year project, and a failure would seriously delay the completion of the ships. The first gun turret was successfully tested on 6 May 1914, likely much to the relief of the Admiralty.

The Admiralty decided on the design of the Queen Elizabeths on 15 June 1912, with the decision on whether they would solely use fuel oil deferred to a subsequent meeting. That meeting must have happened very shortly afterwards because the design that received the Board's stamp the following day was oil-fueled. The design had not been optimised to burn oil instead of coal and the fuel tanks had different requirements than the coal bunkers previously planned. Eustace Tennyson d'Eyncourt, the DNC who followed Watts, estimated that the change so late in the design process cost some 300 long tons (300 t) that could have been put to better use. To guarantee a supply of oil in wartime, Churchill negotiated the Anglo-Persian Oil Convention.

Fisher also believed that the 1912–1913 ships should all be battlecruisers instead of the usual mix of three battleships and a battlecruiser. Churchill initially agreed with him, but was persuaded to go back to the original plan, much to Fisher's fury. Given the speed of the new ships, envisaged as 25 knots (46 km/h; 29 mph), it was decided that the battlecruiser would not be needed and a fourth battleship would be built instead. When the Federation of Malay States offered to fund a further capital ship, the Admiralty decided to add a fifth unit to the class, HMS Malaya.

In some respects, the ships did not quite fulfil their extremely demanding requirement. They were seriously overweight, as a result of which the draught was excessive and they were unable to reach the planned top speed of 25 knots. In the event, the combination of oil fuel and more boilers provided for a service speed of about 24 knots (44 km/h; 28 mph), still a useful improvement on the traditional battle line speed of 21 knots (39 km/h; 24 mph) and just fast enough to be thought of as the first fast battleships. After Jutland Admiral John Jellicoe was persuaded that the slowest ship of this class was good only for about 23 knots (43 km/h; 26 mph), he concluded that, since this should be considered as the speed of the squadron, it would not be safe to risk them in operations away from the main battlefleet.

== Description ==
The ships of the Queen Elizabeth class were 600 feet 6 inches (183.0 m) long between perpendiculars, 634 ft 6 in (193.4 m) long at the waterline, and had a length overall of 643 ft 9 in (196.2 m), excluding the sternwalk fitted on several ships. They had a beam of 90 feet 6 inches (28 m) and a draught of 33 feet 7 inches (10.2 m) at deep load. They had a normal displacement of approximately 32,590 long tons (33,113 t) and 33,260 long tons (33,790 t) at deep load. The ships had a metacentric height of 6.5 feet (2.0 m) at deep load. Their crew numbered between 923 and 951 officers and ratings as completed; by 1920, the number of crew had grown to 1,016 then to 1,025. Service as a flagship increased these numbers from 1,249 to 1,262 that same year.

They were powered by two sets of direct-drive steam turbines, Parsons units were fitted in Queen Elizabeth, Warspite and Malaya while Barham and Valiant had Brown-Curtis turbines. The latter pair were not equipped with the cruising turbines to improve fuel economy at slow speeds used in the first three ships. Each turbine set drove two shafts with 12-foot (3.7 m), three-bladed propellers, using steam provided by 24 Babcock & Wilcox boilers at a working pressure of 235 psi (1,620 kPa; 17 kgf/cm^{2}) in all but Warspite and Barham, which received boilers manufactured by Yarrow. The boilers were ducted into a pair of funnels. The turbines were divided into three watertight compartments arranged side by side; the low-pressure turbines driving the inner pair of shafts were in the centre engine room together, while the high-pressure outboard turbines were in the rooms on either side.

The turbines were rated at 75,000 shaft horsepower (56,000 kW) at overload and were intended to give the ships a maximum speed of 25 knots (46 km/h; 29 mph), although they fell short of that. Due to the war only Barham ran her sea trials on a measured course; in August 1916 she reached a top speed of 23.9 knots (44.3 km/h; 27.5 mph) from 70,788 shp (52,787 kW) at deep load. Fuel storage amounted to 3,400 long tons (3,500 t) of fuel oil which enabled the ships to steam for 5,000 nautical miles (9,300 km; 5,800 mi) at a cruising speed of 12 knots (22 km/h; 14 mph), which fell to 1,600 nautical miles (3,000 km; 1,800 mi) at full speed.

=== Armament and fire control ===
The Queen Elizabeth class was equipped with eight breech-loading (BL) 15-inch Mk I guns in four twin-gun turrets, in two superfiring pairs fore and aft of the superstructure, designated 'A', 'B', 'X', and 'Y' from front to rear. The guns were initially supplied with 80 shells per gun, but the magazines were later modified to allow for up to one hundred shells per gun. The ships carried the guns in Mk I mounts that allowed for elevation to 20 degrees and depression to -5 degrees. The mounts had a weight of 782 t and a train of –150 to +150 degrees. The guns themselves had a weight of 101 t. They could be loaded at any angle, but the crews typically returned to +5 degrees, since the guns could be cleared faster that way. They fired 1,929-pound (875 kg) projectiles at a muzzle velocity of 2,450 ft/s (750 m/s) to a range of 24,423 yards (22,332 m). Their designed rate of fire was one shot every 36 seconds.

The gun even remained competitive in the Second World War after receiving further shell upgrades and mountings with greater elevation, and HMS Warspite would eventually record a hit during the Battle of Calabria which to this day is one of the longest-range naval gunnery hits in history – 24,000 metres (26,000 yd).

The guns could elevate to 20° and depress to −5°, but the turret sights could only elevate 15°, effectively limiting the range that could be achieved unless firing under director control. The sights were equipped to permit the guns to fire at full charge or with 3/4 charge.

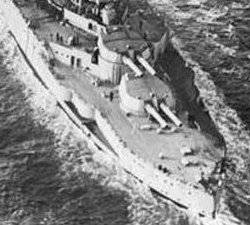
Queen Elizabeth c. 1918 showing the two aft port secondary casemates plated over

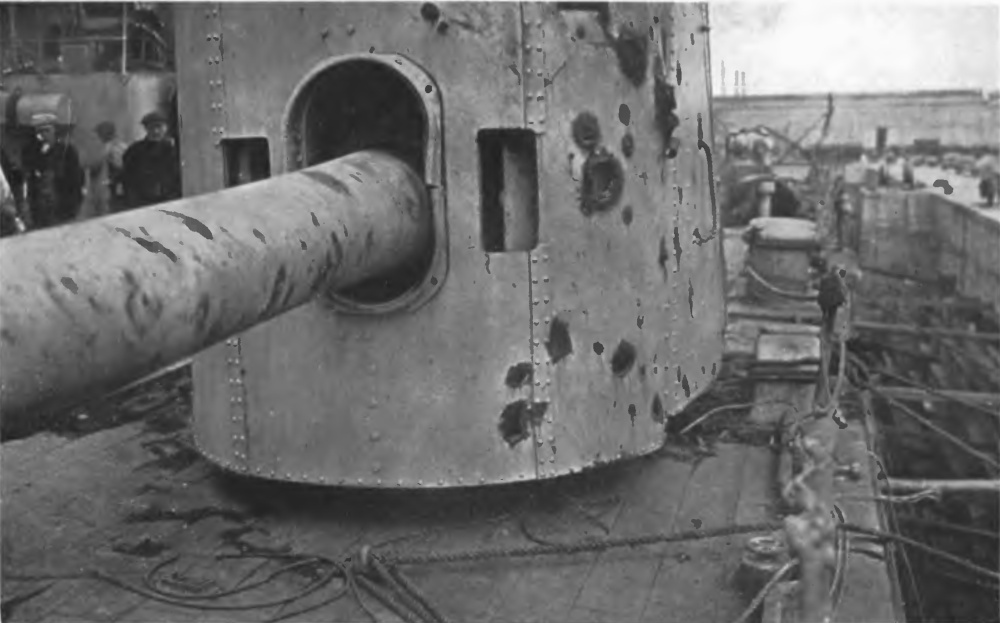
Forecastle deck gun as added to all ships in 1915–1916, here seen on Warspite after Jutland

The ships' secondary battery consisted of sixteen 45-calibre BL 6-inch (152 mm) Mk XII guns. The guns had a muzzle velocity of 2,825 ft/s (861 m/s) from their 100-pound (45 kg) projectiles. At their maximum elevation of 15 degrees, they had a range of 13,600 yd (12,400 m). As designed twelve of these were mounted in casemates on the upper deck, six of each on the broadside of the vessel amidships; the remaining four guns were on the main deck aft abreast 'Y' turret. In an effort to ameliorate the flooding problems that the casemated guns in the Iron Duke-class ships had in heavy seas, the guns in the Queen Elizabeths were moved back from abreast 'A' turret to 'B' turret, but this made little difference in service. The aft guns were more prone to flood and were virtually useless even in moderate seas. Only Queen Elizabeth was completed with them; one pair was removed and the other was repositioned on the forecastle and protected by gun shields in May 1915. The casemates were plated over to improve their seaworthiness. The other ships were similarly modified while fitting-out.

Each gun was provided with 130 rounds. Stowage was provided for 30 rounds at each gun as the only ammunition hoists for them were located at the forward end of the battery. Captain Morgan Singer, commander of the RN's gunnery school HMS Excellent, criticized this arrangement, saying that it had been proven inefficient in the pre-dreadnought battleships and he recommended using dredger hoists as they were much faster. His comments were rejected as the Admiralty believed that the guns would only intermittently be in use as destroyers attempted to close to torpedo range and they desired to maintain a break in the cordite supply between the magazines and the battery. In service this led to the gun crews keeping additional rounds immediately available at the guns in case they were needed. This resulted in an ammunition fire aboard Malaya during the Battle of Jutland that nearly resulted in the loss of the ship.

The ships also mounted four 3-pounder (47-millimetre (1.9 in)) saluting guns. Their anti-aircraft (AA) armament consisted of two quick-firing (QF) 3-inch (76 mm) 20 cwt Mk I (Note: "Cwt" is the abbreviation for hundredweight, 20 cwt referring to the weight of the gun.) guns. They were fitted with four submerged 21-inch (533 mm) torpedo tubes, two on each broadside. Each ship was supplied with a total of 20 Mk II or Mk IV torpedoes.

The Queen Elizabeth-class ships were completed with two fire-control directors. The one that was mounted above the conning tower was protected by an armoured hood and was fitted with a 15-foot (4.6 m) rangefinder. The other director was on top of the tripod mast and was equipped with a 9-foot (2.7 m). The main armament could be controlled by 'X' turret as well and each turret was fitted with a 15-foot rangefinder. A torpedo-control director with a 9-foot rangefinder was mounted at the aft end of the superstructure. The secondary armament was primarily controlled by directors mounted on each side of the compass platform on the foremast once they began to be fitted in March 1917. The rangefinders in 'B' and 'X' turrets were replaced by 30-foot (9.1 m) models between 1919 and 1922.

Flying-off platforms were fitted on all the ships on the roofs of 'B' and 'X' turrets in 1918. Between them the ships carried three fighters and seven reconnaissance aircraft.

=== Armour ===
Armour protection was modified from the previous Iron Duke class, with a thicker belt and improved underwater protection. The scale of deck armour was less generous, though typical of contemporary practice.

== Ships ==
A further ship was authorised in 1914 and would have been named Agincourt (a name later applied to a dreadnought expropriated from Ottoman Turkey). Although most sources and several official papers in the class's Ships Cover (Note: A Ships Cover was an official volume prepared by the Constructor's Department and contained machinery contracts, rough design specifications, trials reports, and other documents relating to the design, construction, and repair work for a specific class of ships. Surviving Covers are held by the National Maritime Museum at its out-station in Woolwich.) describe her as a further repeat of the Queen Elizabeth design, one historian, Nicholas Lambert, has claimed that Agincourt would have been built on battlecruiser lines. This design would have kept the Queen Elizabeth armament, but substituted thinner armour down to 10 inches (254 mm) instead of 12 inches (305 mm), for example] in order to gain a 28-knot (52 km/h; 32 mph) top speed.

Whatever the case, Agincourt was cancelled at the outbreak of war in 1914. The cancellation, proposed by Churchill in memoranda of 1 and 14 June 1914, was intended to shave around £900,000 off that year's naval estimates, which had met with resistance from leading members of the ruling Liberal Party. It had been proposed to build a new type of semi-submersible torpedo cruiser, the Polyphemus class, in place of Agincourt, and submarines in place of another planned battleship, HMS Resistance, and in place of all but two or three of that year's planned destroyers.

Construction data
Name	Builder	Laid down	Launched	Commissioned	Fate
Queen Elizabeth	HM Dockyard, Portsmouth	21 October 1912	16 October 1913	22 December 1914	Broken up at Dalmuir, 1948
Warspite	HM Dockyard, Devonport	31 October 1912	26 November 1913	8 March 1915	Towed for scrapping at Faslane; ran aground at Prussia Cove April 1947; Broken up at Marazion, 1950
Valiant	Fairfield, Clydebank	31 January 1913	4 November 1914	13 January 1916	Broken up at Cairnryan, 1948
Barham	John Brown, Clydebank	24 February 1913	31 December 1914	19 October 1915	Sunk by submarine, 25 November 1941
Malaya	Armstrong Whitworth, Tyneside	20 October 1913	18 March 1915	1 February 1916	Broken up at Faslane, 1948
Agincourt	HM Dockyard, Portsmouth	—N/a	—N/a	—N/a	Cancelled, August 1914

== Service ==
=== First World War ===
In the First World War, Queen Elizabeth was detached from the squadron and took part in the Dardanelles Campaign, but missed Jutland as she was undergoing dock maintenance.

At the Battle of Jutland, four of the ships formed Admiral Hugh Evan-Thomas's 5th Battle Squadron, and in the clash with the German 1st Scouting Group under Admiral Franz von Hipper they "fired with extraordinary rapidity and accuracy" (according to Admiral Scheer, commander of the High Seas Fleet), damaging SMS Lützow and SMS Seydlitz and a number of other German warships. These battleships were able to engage German battlecruisers at a range of 19,000 yards (17,400 m), which was beyond the maximum range of the Germans' guns. Three of the Queen Elizabeths received hits from German warships during the engagement, yet they all returned home. Warspite was the most heavily damaged, with her rudder jammed and taking fifteen hits, coming close to foundering.

=== Between the wars ===
Between the wars, the ships received considerable upgrades, including new machinery, small-tube boilers, deck armour upgrades, torpedo belt armour, trunked funnels, new secondary armament and anti-aircraft armament, and many improvements in gunlaying and electronics. Queen Elizabeth, Valiant, and Warspite were the most modernised, with all three receiving the new "Queen Anne's Mansions" block superstructure for the bridge, whilst twenty 4.5" dual-purpose guns in 10 twin-gun turrets replaced the 6" casemate secondary weapons on Queen Elizabeth and Valiant. Warspite kept her 6" secondary guns, now reduced to just four per battery.

=== Second World War ===
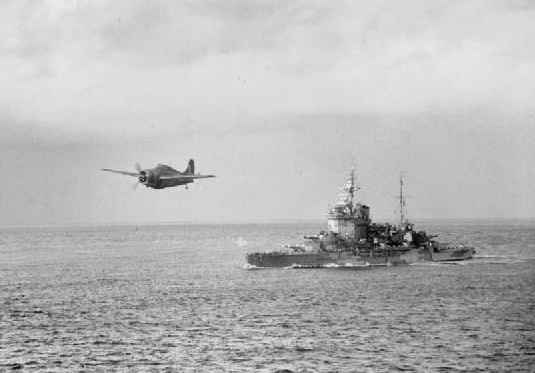
HMS Warspite off Salerno, 1943

By the Second World War, the class were showing their age. Barham and Malaya, the least-modernized of the class, were at a disadvantage compared to modern battleships. In spite of this, Malaya prevented a direct attack on a transatlantic convoy by the modern German battlecruisers Scharnhorst and Gneisenau by her presence though the German ships led u-boats onto the convoy sinking six ships. Queen Elizabeth, Warspite, and Valiant, the more modernised of the class, fared better. With her modern fire control equipment, Warspite scored a hit on an Italian battleship during the Battle of Calabria at a range of more than 26,000 yards, one of the longest range naval artillery hits in history. (Note: The German warship Scharnhorst scored a hit on the British aircraft carrier HMS Glorious at approximately the same range, a month earlier, during the evacuation of Norway.)

Modern torpedoes outclassed their torpedo belt protection: in November 1941, Barham was torpedoed by a U-boat and sank in five minutes, with the loss of over 800 of her crew, when her magazines detonated. Warspite survived a direct hit and two near-misses by German glider bombs, while Queen Elizabeth and Valiant were repaired and returned to service after being badly damaged by limpet mines placed by Italian frogmen during a raid at Alexandria Harbour in 1941.

=== HMS Queen Elizabeth ===
Queen Elizabeth took part in the Dardanelles Campaign of 1915 bombarding forts, but missed Jutland in 1916. She became Admiral Beatty's flagship in 1917 after he assumed command of the Grand Fleet. In the Second World War she was mined by Italian frogmen and badly damaged, but did not ground in the shallow water of Alexandria Harbour in 1941. She was subsequently repaired, and served in the Far East until 1945.

=== HMS Warspite ===
Warspite suffered severe damage at Jutland, being hit by at least 15 heavy shells. She lost 14 men, with 32 wounded, firing a total of 259 shells. In the Second World War, she took part in many battles, including Narvik, Cape Matapan, Crete, and Salerno, where she was hit by a glider bomb. She was never fully repaired, and became a coastal bombardment ship, covering the Normandy landings, further operations in other parts of France, and the Walcheren landings. She holds the most battle honours for an individual ship in the Royal Navy's history, with 15.

=== HMS Valiant ===
Valiant received no hits at Jutland but suffered one wounded and fired 288 shells. In the Second World War, she took part in the attack on the French Fleet at Mers-el-Kebir, and was mined and damaged at Alexandria in 1941. She was repaired, and served in the Far East until 1944. On 8 August 1944 whilst in the floating dock at Trincomalee, Ceylon, she was severely damaged when the dock collapsed with the result that repairs were stopped.

=== HMS Barham ===
Barham was named after Lord Barham, First Lord of the Admiralty. The Barham received five hits at Jutland, suffering 26 dead and 46 wounded and fired 337 shells. In the Second World War, she fought at Cape Matapan. On 25 November 1941 she was struck by three torpedoes from U-331, commanded by Oberleutnant zur See Hans-Diedrich von Tiesenhausen, and went down with 850 of her crew.

=== HMS Malaya ===
Malaya was hit eight times at Jutland, suffering 63 dead and 68 wounded, and fired 215 shells. In the Second World War, she escorted convoys and was damaged by a torpedo from U-106 in 1941. Subsequently, she escorted several convoys and supported various operations following the Normandy invasion until she was decommissioned in 1945.

=== HMS Agincourt ===
HMS Agincourt was to be the sixth member of the Queen Elizabeth class. She was authorized in 1913, and intended for completion in late 1916, but was cancelled after the outbreak of the First World War. She is not to be confused with HMS Agincourt that was ordered by Brazil, sold to the Ottoman Empire while under construction, and seized for use by the Royal Navy before the beginning of the first World War.

=== Other ships ===
The Canadian Naval Aid Bill of 1913 asked for 35 million dollars for the construction of "battleships or armoured cruisers of the most modern and powerful type." intended to provide the funds for three modern battleships, which most likely would have been three improved members of the Queen Elizabeth class, potentially named as Acadia, Quebec and Ontario, in much the same way as Malaya had been funded. The bill was opposed by the Liberal-dominated senate in Parliament, and was not passed. It is unclear if these ships would have served in the Royal Navy (as with outright gifts like Malaya or the battlecruiser New Zealand), or if they would have served in the Royal Canadian Navy (HMAS Australia, an Indefatigable-class battlecruiser, served with the Royal Australian Navy).

== Bibliography ==
- Admiralty Historical Section (2000). Naval Operations of the Campaign in Norway, April–June 1940. Whitehall Histories: Naval Staff Histories. London: Frank Cass. ISBN 0-7146-5119-2.
- Breyer, Siegfried (1973). Battleships and Battle Cruisers 1905–1970. New York: Doubleday. ISBN 0-385-07247-3.
- Brown, David (2002). The Royal Navy and the Mediterranean: November 1940 - December 1941, Volume II. Frank Cass Publishers. ISBN 0-7146-5205-9.
- Brown, David K. (1999). The Grand Fleet: Warship Design and Development 1906–1922. Annapolis, Maryland: Naval Institute Press. ISBN 1-55750-315-X.
- Burt, R. A. (2012a). British Battleships, 1919–1945 (2nd ed.). Annapolis, Maryland: Naval Institute Press. ISBN 978-1-59114-052-8.
- Burt, R. A. (2012b). British Battleships of World War One (2nd ed.). Annapolis, Maryland: Naval Institute Press. ISBN 978-0-87021-863-7.
- Campbell, John (1998). Jutland: An Analysis of the Fighting. London: Conway Maritime Press. ISBN 978-1-55821-759-1.
- Campbell, N. J. M. (1980). "Great Britain". In Chesneau, Roger (ed.). Conway's All the World's Fighting Ships 1922–1946. New York: Mayflower Books. pp. 2–85. ISBN 0-8317-0303-2.
- Friedman, Norman (2015). The British Battleship 1906–1946. Barnsley, UK: Seaforth Publishing. ISBN 978-1-84832-225-7.
- Friedman, Norman (2014). Fighting the Great War at Sea: Strategy, Tactics and Technology. Annapolis, Maryland: Naval Institute Press. ISBN 978-1-59114-188-4.
- Friedman, Norman (2011). Naval Weapons of World War One: Guns, Torpedoes, Mines and ASW Weapons of All Nations; An Illustrated Directory. Barnsley, UK: Seaforth Publishing. ISBN 978-1-84832-100-7.
- Greger, René (1997). Battleships of the World. Annapolis, Maryland: Naval Institute Press. ISBN 1-55750-069-X.
- Halpern, Paul, ed. (2011). The Mediterranean Fleet 1920–1929. Navy Records Society Publications. Vol. 158. Farnham, UK: Ashgate. ISBN 978-1-4094-2756-8.
- Jellicoe, John (1919). The Grand Fleet, 1914–1916: Its Creation, Development, and Work. New York: George H. Doran Company. OCLC 162593478.
- Lambert, Nicholas (2002) [1999]. Sir John Fisher's Naval Revolution. Columbia, SC: University South Carolina Press. ISBN 978-1-57003-492-3.
- Massie, Robert K. (2003). Castles of Steel: Britain, Germany, and the Winning of the Great War at Sea. New York: Random House. ISBN 0-679-45671-6.
- Parkes, Oscar (1990) [1966]. British Battleships, Warrior 1860 to Vanguard 1950: A History of Design, Construction, and Armament (New & rev. ed.). Annapolis, Maryland: Naval Institute Press. ISBN 1-55750-075-4.
- Preston, Antony (1985). "Great Britain and Empire Forces". In Gray, Randal (ed.). Conway's All the World's Fighting Ships 1906–1921. Annapolis, Maryland: Naval Institute Press. pp. 1–104. ISBN 0-85177-245-5.
- Raven, Alan & Roberts, John (1976). British Battleships of World War Two: The Development and Technical History of the Royal Navy's Battleship and Battlecruisers from 1911 to 1946. Annapolis, Maryland: Naval Institute Press. ISBN 0-87021-817-4.
