= Cousin (disambiguation) =

A cousin is the child of one's aunt or uncle, or a more distant relative who shares a common ancestor. It may also refer to:

== People ==
- Cousin Bette (La Cousine Bette), an 1846 novel by Honoré de Balzac that was made into a 1998 movie starring Jessica Lange
- Cousin Brucie, a nickname for radio personality Bruce Morrow
- "Cousin Dupree", a song by Steely Dan from their 2000 album Two Against Nature
- Cousin Henry, a novel by Anthony Trollope in 1879
- Cousin Joe, a blues and jazz singer born in 1907
- Cousin Itt, a member of the fictional Addams Family in the 1964 television series
- Cousin Oliver, a character on The Brady Bunch, and a metaphor to denote the decision to add a cute child actor to the cast of a television program to improve its ratings
- Cousin Skeeter, a comedy television show which ran on Nickelodeon from 1998 to 2001

== Film and television ==
- The Cousin (Italian: La cugina), 1974 drama film by Aldo Lado
- Cousin Cousine, a 1975 French-language film which tells the story of cousins-by-marriage who have an affair
  - Cousins (1989 film), its English-language remake

== Music ==
- Cousin (album), a 2023 studio album by Wilco

== Surname ==
Notable people with the surname Cousin include:

- Alan Cousin, Scottish footballer
- Aurelien Cousin, Maltese water polo player
- Daniel Cousin, Gabonese footballer
- Ertharin Cousin, American ambassador
- Germaine Cousin-Zermatten (1925–2026), Swiss herbalist and author
- Jérôme Cousin, French racing cyclist
- Victor Cousin, French philosopher

== Other uses ==
- Cousin prime, a pair of prime numbers that differ by four
- Cousin problems, two math questions in several complex variables, concerning the existence of meromorphic functions
- Protolampra sobrina, a noctuid moth of Britain known as the cousin german
- Cousin Island, a small granitic island of the Seychelles

== See also ==
- Cousins (disambiguation)
- Cussen (surname)
