= Sturdee baronets =

Extinct baronetcy in the Baronetage of the United Kingdom

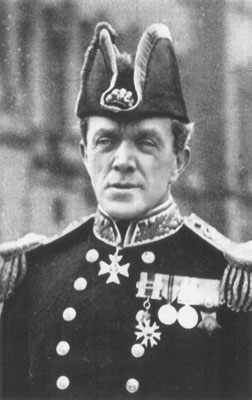
Sir Doveton Sturdee, 1st Baronet

The Sturdee Baronetcy, of the Falkland Islands, was a title in the Baronetage of the United Kingdom. It was created on 19 January 1916 for Vice-Admiral Sir Doveton Sturdee in honour of his victory at the Battle of the Falkland Islands. In 1970 the title became extinct on the death of the second Baronet, who had reached the rank of Rear Admiral.

== Sturdee baronets, of the Falkland Islands (1916) ==
- Sir (Frederick Charles) Doveton Sturdee, 1st Baronet (1859–1925)
- Sir Lionel Arthur Doveton Sturdee, 2nd Baronet (1884–1970)

Coat of arms of Sturdee baronets
Crest Issuant out of a naval crown an arm in armour holding in the hand a spiked club proper. Escutcheon Gyronny of eight Argent and Gules on a chief Azure an anchor fessewise Or. Motto Firmus Maneo
