= Couzens =

Couzens is a surname and may refer to:

== People ==
- Andy Couzens (born 1975), English retired footballer
- Brian Couzens (1933–2015), British music executive
- Christine Couzens (born 1958), Australian politician
- Dominic Couzens, British birdwatcher and writer
- Edward Couzens-Lake (born 1963), British writer, publisher and broadcaster
- Frank Couzens (1902–1950), American politician, mayor of Detroit, son of James
- H. D. Couzens (1872–1914), American writer
- H. H. Couzens (1877–1944), British electrical engineering executive
- James J. Couzens (1872–1936), United States Senator from the state of Michigan, father of Frank
- Julia Couzens (born 1947), American artist from California
- Kenneth Couzens (1925–2004), English civil servant
- Thomas Couzens (died 1959), member of the Royal New Zealand Air Force for whom Couzens Bay and Couzens Saddle are named
- Michael Couzens (1946–2023) American communications attorney and community broadcasting advocate
- Millie Couzens (born 2003), British cyclist
- Tim Couzens (1944–2016), South African literary and social historian
- Wayne Couzens (born 1972), British murderer and police officer

== Places ==
- Couzens Bay, an ice-filled inlet within Ross Ice Shelf, Antarctica
  - Couzens Saddle, a landform in Oates Land between the bay and Byrd Glacier

== See also ==
- Cozens
- Cousins (disambiguation)
