= Cozens =

English surname article

Cozens is an English surname. Following the Norman Conquest of England in 1066, the name Cozens was first found in Britina. It was a name for a person who was related to someone of note in the area. Further research showed the name was derived from the Old French, cusin, and the Old English, cousin, which means relative.

Notable people with the surname include:

- Alexander Cozens (1717–1786), British landscape painter
- Charles Cozens (1784–1863), Canadian politician
- Chris Cozens (born 1982), British freestyle swimmer
- Dylan Cozens (baseball) (born 1994), American baseball player
- Dylan Cozens (born 2001), Canadian ice hockey player
- Fred Cozens (1890–1954), American basketball coach
- John Cozens (footballer) (20th century), English professional footballer
- John Cozens (musician) (1906–1999), English-Canadian musician
- John Robert Cozens (1752–1797), English draftsman and painter
- Lewis Cozens (1909–1968), British railway historian and author
- Peter Cozens (21st century), New Zealand businessperson
- Spencer Cozens (born 1965), musician, writer and producer

== See also ==
- Cozens-Hardy
- Couzens
- Luke F. Cozans (1836–1903), New York lawyer and politician
