= Battenberg course indicator =

Mechanical navigation aid

The Battenberg course indicator is a mechanical calculating device invented by Prince Louis of Battenberg in 1892 for taking station on other vessels whose range, bearing, course and speed are known. By extension, it has a range of other functions related to relative velocity calculations.

A number of versions of the device were produced and it proved particularly useful for station-keeping, such as ships moving in convoy during World War II. Manufacture of the instruments was contracted to Elliott Brothers, London. Devices based on the Battenberg indicator were also developed for determining course and distance in aviation and when making allowances for aircraft drift due to winds. Instruments were also manufactured for other navies, for example in the USA.

== Mark I ==
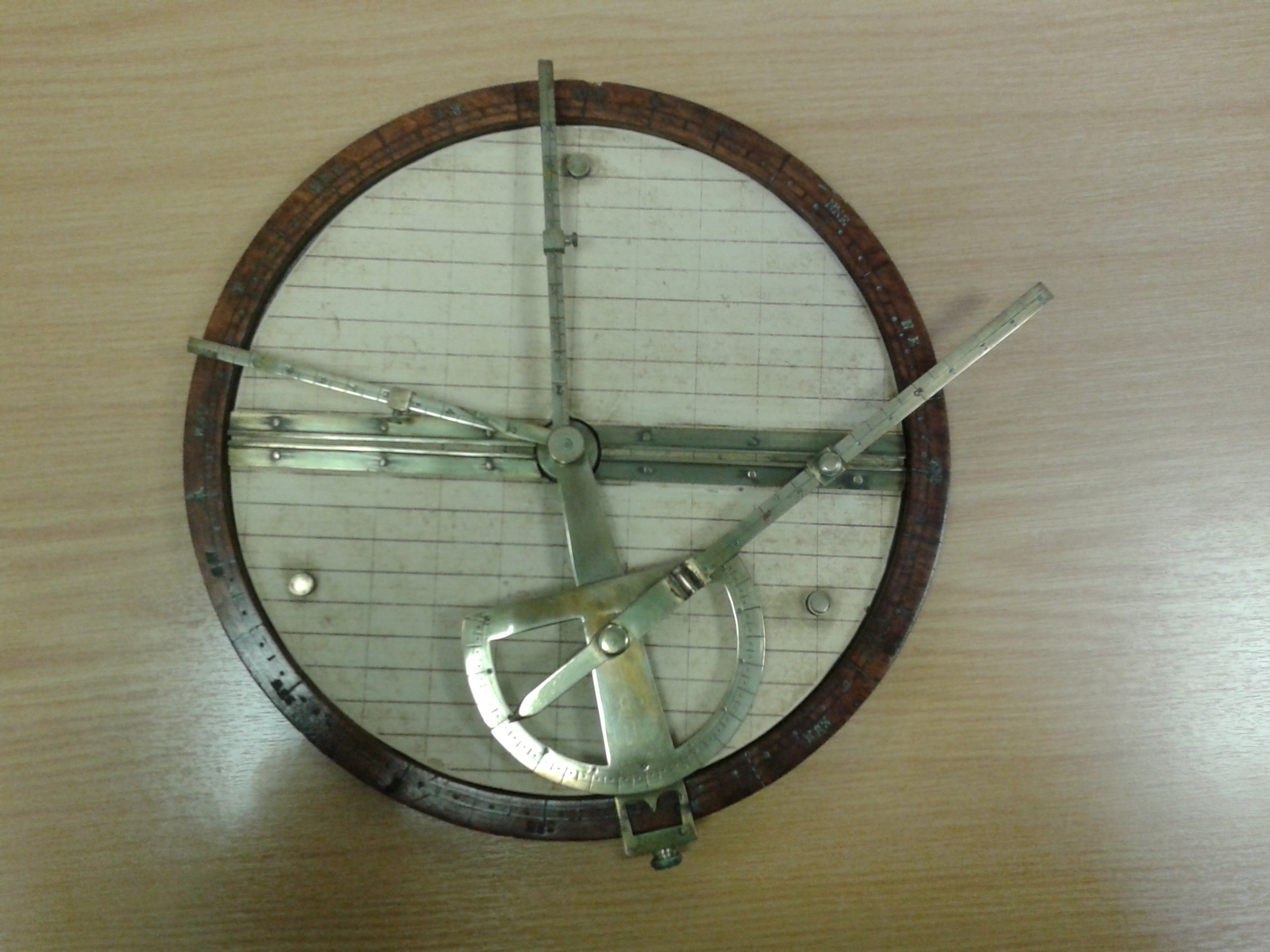
The prototype Battenberg course indicator of 1892. The guide bar and circular disc are at the bottom of the picture; the position bars are at the top and left; the speed bar stretches up and right to meet the almost horizontal diameter grove at the 3 o'clock position

Prince Louis of Battenberg employed a firm of London instrument makers to build a prototype to his design. The device comprised:

- 2 position bars for setting the initial and final stations
- A speed bar, on which the speed of the ship (relative to the flagship) was set, and which was clamped at one end into the diameter grove by the speed ratio clamp
- A guide bar
- A circular disc

To use the instrument, the course of the flagship was first set on the guide bar. When the initial and final stations had been set using the position bars, the speed ratio clamp was set to show the ratio of own ship speed to the speed of the flagship (if the flagship was doing 10 knots, and the manoeuvring ship had 15 knots available, the clamp would be set to "1.5"). Ensuring that the pin beneath the speed ratio clamp was set within the diameter groove, the course required to take station could then be read off the circular disc.

== Mark II ==
The Mark II version dispensed with the use of relative speeds and set the guide bar on a sliding speed scale, thus allowing the speed of the guide and the speed of the own ship to be set independently. The device was constructed largely of brass.

== Mark III ==
The Mark III instrument was constructed of aluminium alloy.

== Mark IV ==
Similar to Mark III. The circular scale attached to the end of the 'own ship' bar was moved to be part of the pivot assembly so that it is fixed relative to the 'guide bar' instead of being fixed relative to the 'own ship' bar. The 'own ship' bar was redesigned with a pointer on the end to read off the scale.

== Mark V ==
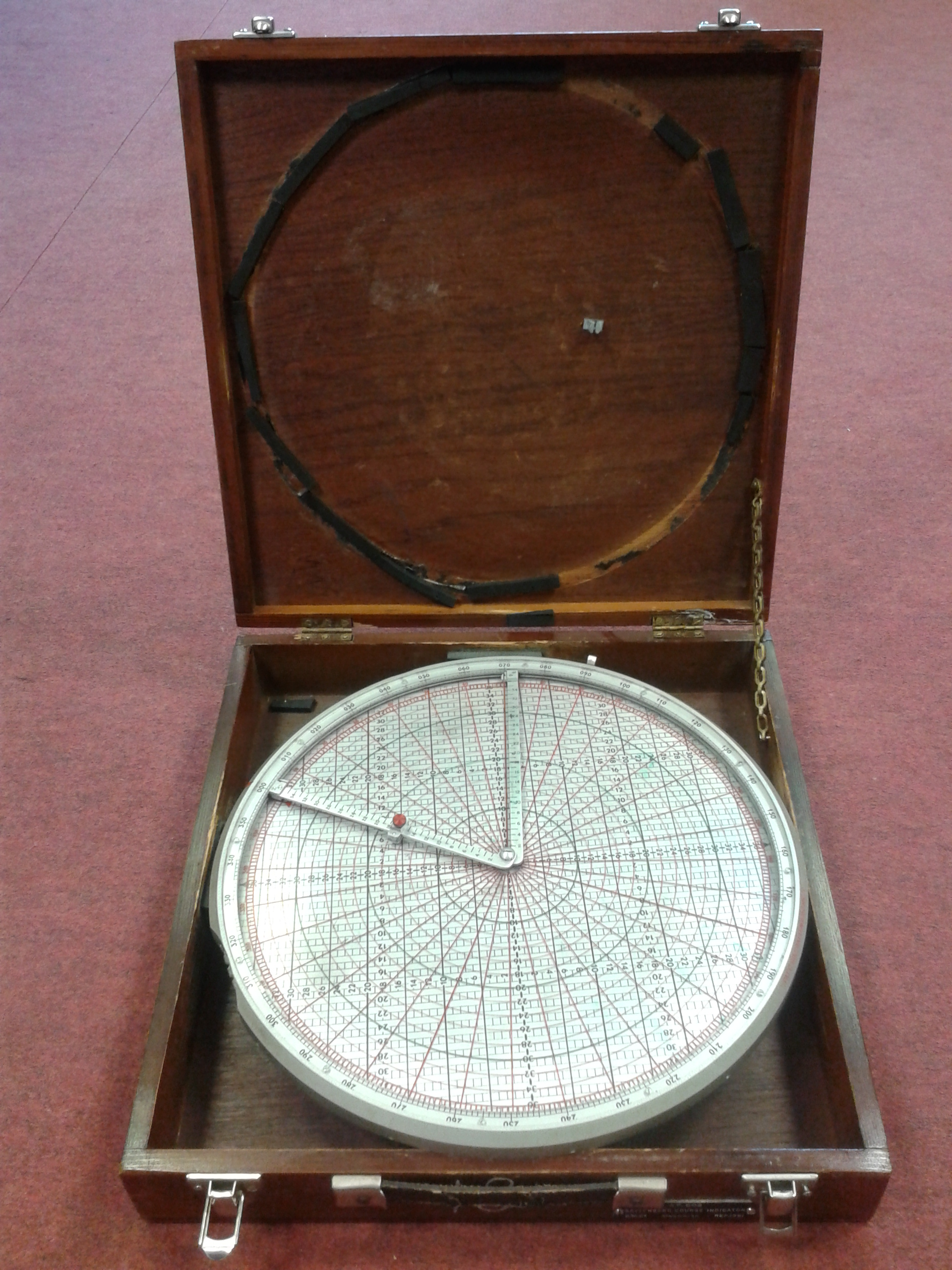
The Mk V Battenberg course indicator

The Mark V instrument dispensed with the guide bar and own ship's bar, retaining only the two position bars. However, the circular base plate was added to by the provision of two celluloid transparent discs which were placed on top of the base and free to rotate. The instrument body was made of an aluminium alloy and had a scale graded in degrees around the outside. The base plate had no scale, but a series of interrupted parallel lines running across it. This device was in production around 1955.

One disc was marked with a scale from 0 at the centre to 36 on the outside, in a similar manner to the markings originally etched onto the base plate, except that three marked scales were used, one in a line through the centre and another parallel but halfway to the edge either side of the centre line. The markings were then repeated by a second set at right angles to the first. Depending on usage, the marked scale numbers could refer to distance or speed.

A second disc was marked with a circular scale all around the edge labelled in degrees, with radial lines from the centre of the disc stretching out every ten degrees. The disc also had concentric circles which coincided with the marked scale on the other disc. To aid clarity, markings on the second disc were in a different colour to those on the first.

The rear of the device had a separate rotating calculator, where if the ship's speed was set against the 60-minute guide mark, then the distance travelled at any time 0–60 minutes could be read off against the logarithmic time scale.
