= Carl Vandyk =

British photographer (1851–1931)

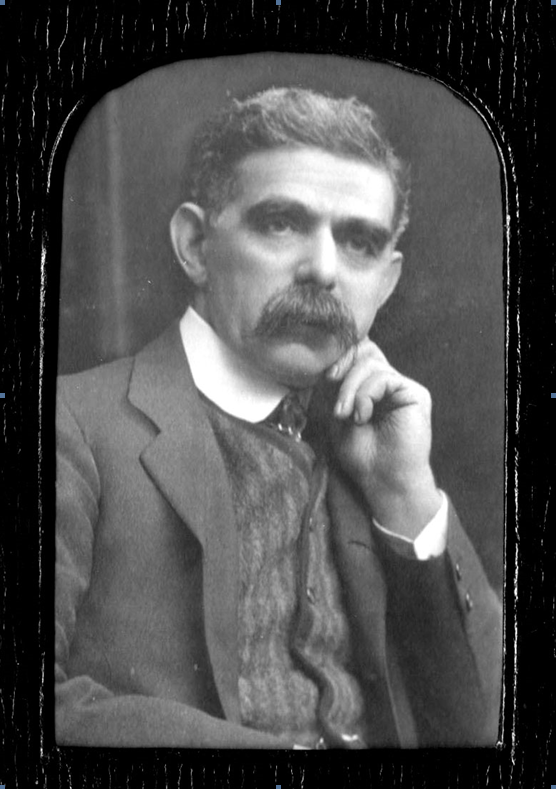
- Carl Vandyk, c. 1900s
- Born: 17 January 1851; Bunde, Germany
- Died: 18 November 1931 (aged 80); London
- Occupation: photographer

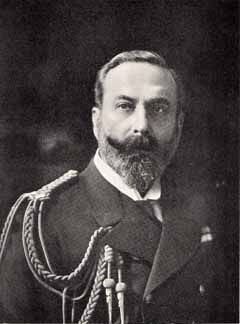
Prince Louis photographed by Carl Vandyk of London, 1905

Carl Vandyk (17 January 1851 – 18 November 1931) was a successful London photographer born in Bunde, Germany. From 1882 he owned a studio at Gloucester Road taking images of the British Royal Family including Queen Victoria, King George V as well as other notables such as Alexander I of Yugoslavia, Christian X of Denmark, Buffalo Bill and Enrico Caruso. From 1901 the studio moved to Buckingham Palace Road, London.

== Biography ==
Carl became a British citizen on 4 February 1886.

Carl's son Herbert Vandyk (1879–1943) took over the family business in 1913 after studying in London, Berlin and Paris and went on to accumulate 22 Royal Warrants.

Carl Vandyk owned three London hotels close to his studios:

- The Rembrandt Hotel, Thurloe Place, London SW
- The Rubens Hotel, Buckingham Palace Road, London SW
- The Vandyke Hotel, Cromwell Road, London SW7

Carl had two brothers, Aaron Vandyke (1843–1892) and Herman Vandyke (a.k.a. Hyman) (a.k.a. Vandyck) (1838–1919) who were also in the photographic trade. Aaron had studios in Liverpool from c.1869 until c.1902 and Herman in West London from c.1881 until c.1904.
