= Prince Louis of Battenberg =

Royal Navy admiral and nobleman (1854–1921)

Admiral of the Fleet The Most Honourable The Marquess of Milford Haven GCB GCVO KCMG PC ADC
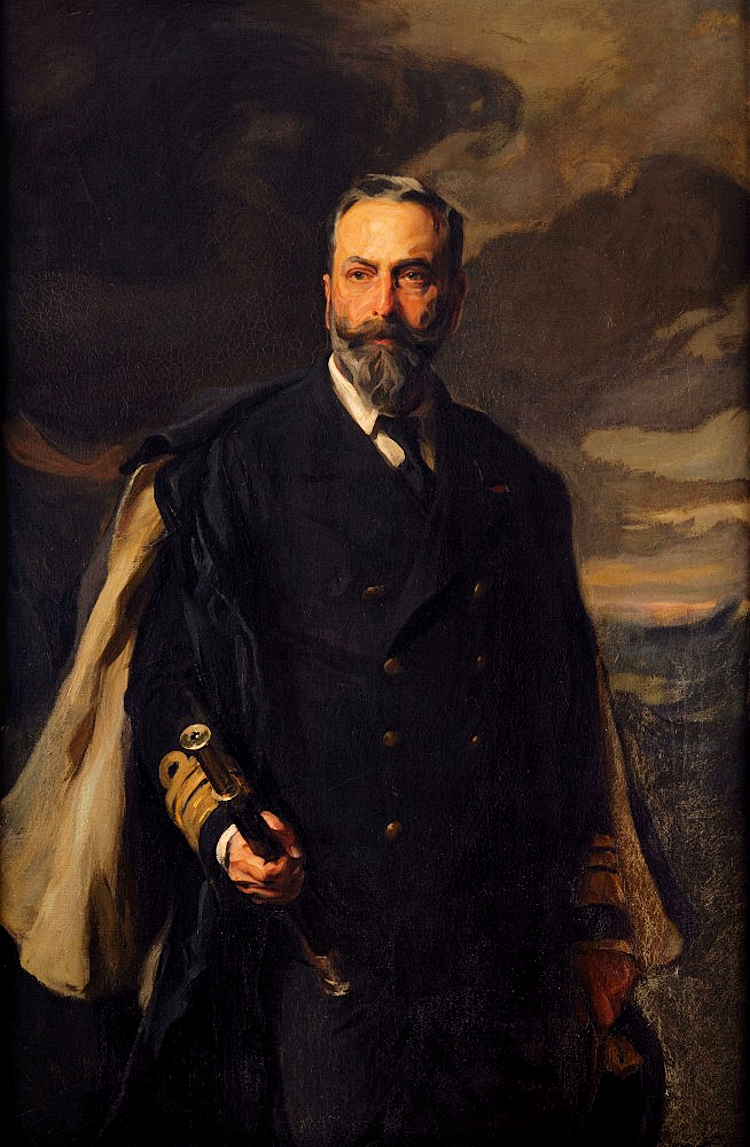
- Portrait, 1909

First Sea Lord
- In office 8 December 1912 – 28 October 1914
- Prime Minister: H. H. Asquith
- Preceded by: Sir Francis Bridgeman
- Succeeded by: John Fisher, 1st Baron Fisher

Member of the House of Lords Lord Temporal
- Hereditary peerage 7 November 1917 – 11 September 1921; Marquess of Milford Haven
- Preceded by: New creation
- Succeeded by: George Mountbatten

Personal details
- Born: Count Louis Alexander of Battenberg; 24 May 1854 Graz, Austrian Empire
- Died: 11 September 1921 (aged 67) Piccadilly, London, England
- Resting place: St. Mildred's Church, Whippingham, Isle of Wight
- Spouse: Princess Victoria of Hesse and by Rhine (m. 1884)
- Children: Alice, Princess Andrew of Greece and Denmark; Louise, Queen of Sweden; George Mountbatten, 2nd Marquess of Milford Haven; Louis Mountbatten, 1st Earl Mountbatten of Burma
- Parent(s): Prince Alexander of Hesse and by Rhine; Julia, Princess of Battenberg

Military service
- Allegiance: United Kingdom
- Branch/service: Royal Navy
- Years of service: 1868–1914
- Commands: First Sea Lord (1912–14); 3rd and 4th Divisions, Home Fleet (1911); Atlantic Fleet (1908–10); 2nd Cruiser Squadron (1905–07); Naval Intelligence (1902–05); HMS Implacable (1901–02); HMS Majestic (1897–99); HMS Cambrian (1894–97)
- Battles/wars: Anglo-Egyptian War

Louis Alexander Mountbatten, 1st Marquess of Milford Haven (24 May 1854 – 11 September 1921), formerly Prince Louis Alexander of Battenberg, was a British naval officer and German prince related by marriage to the British royal family.

Although born in Austria, and brought up in Italy and Germany, Louis enrolled in the British Royal Navy at the age of fourteen. Queen Victoria and her son the Prince of Wales (later King Edward VII) occasionally intervened in his career: the Queen thought that there was "a belief that the Admiralty are afraid of promoting Officers who are Princes on account of the radical attacks of low papers and scurrilous ones". However, Louis welcomed assignments that provided opportunities for him to acquire skills and to demonstrate to his superiors that he was serious about his naval career. Posts on royal yachts and tours arranged by Queen Victoria and the Prince of Wales impeded his progress, as his promotions were perceived as undeserved royal favours.

After a naval career lasting more than forty years, in 1912 Louis was appointed First Sea Lord, the professional head of the British naval service. With the First World War looming, he took steps to ready the British fleet for combat, but his background as a German prince forced his retirement once the war began, when anti-German sentiment was running high. He changed his name and relinquished his German titles, at the behest of King George V, in 1917. The King made Louis Marquess of Milford Haven.

Louis married Princess Victoria of Hesse and by Rhine, a granddaughter of Queen Victoria. They had four children: Alice, Louise, George, and Louis. Louise later became Queen of Sweden, while the younger Louis served as First Sea Lord, like his father, from 1954 to 1959. The Marquess and Marchioness of Milford Haven were the maternal grandparents of Prince Philip, Duke of Edinburgh.

== Early life ==
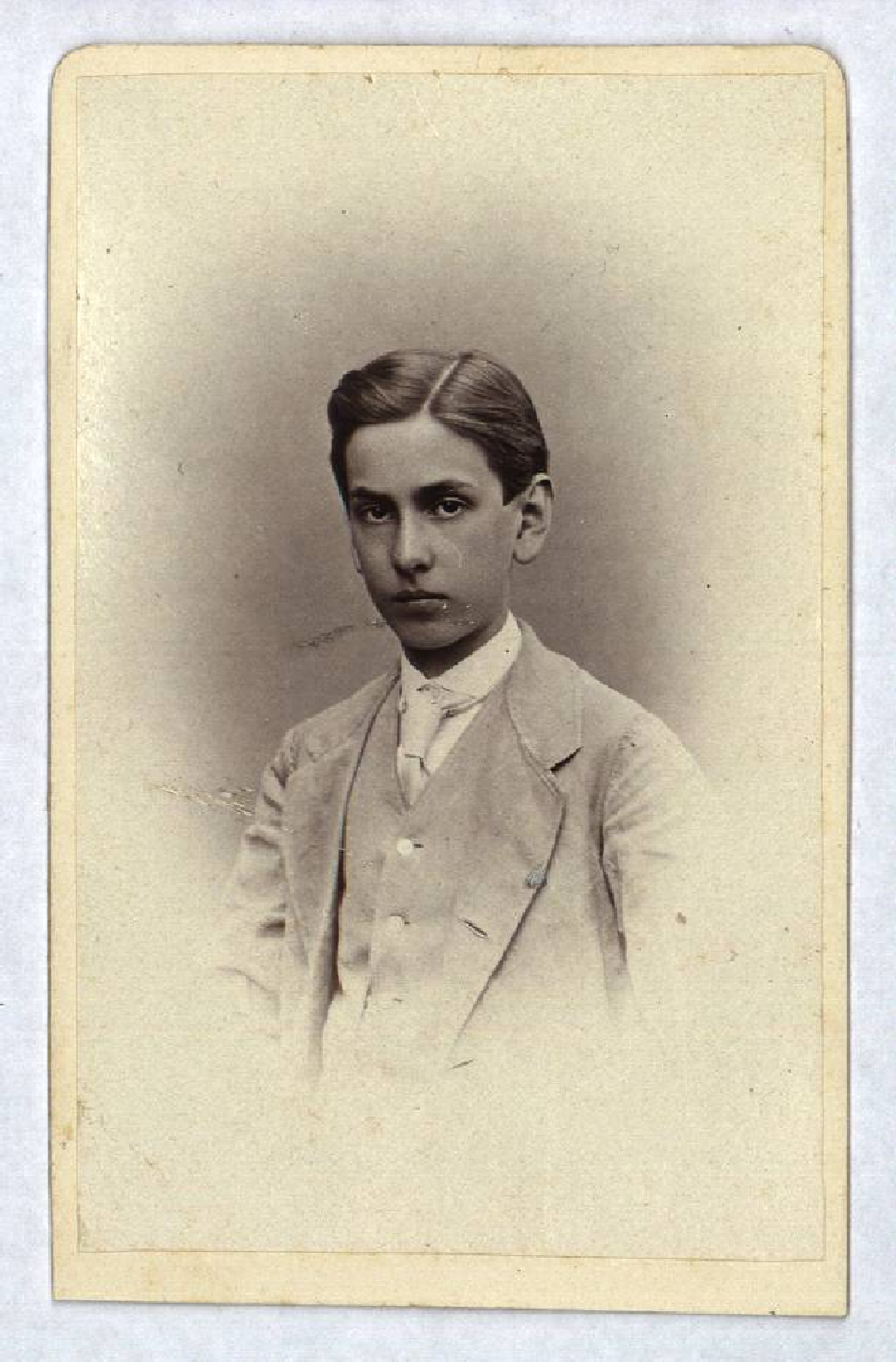
Prince Louis photographed by Franz Backofen, c. 1865

Louis was born on 24 May 1854 in Graz, Styria, the eldest son of Prince Alexander of Hesse and by Rhine by his morganatic marriage to Countess Julia von Hauke. Because of his morganatic parentage, Louis did not inherit his father's rank in the Grand Duchy of Hesse; and, from birth, his style of Illustrious Highness and title of Count of Battenberg instead derived from the rank given to his mother at the time of her marriage. On 26 December 1858, he automatically became His Serene Highness Prince Louis of Battenberg when his mother was elevated to Princess of Battenberg with the style of Serene Highness, by decree of her husband's brother, Louis III, Grand Duke of Hesse.

Shortly after Louis's birth, his father was stationed with the Austro-Hungarian Army in Northern Italy during the Second Italian War of Independence. Louis's early years were spent either in the north of Italy or at Prince Alexander's two houses in Hesse, the castle of Heiligenberg in Jugenheim, and the Alexander Palace in Darmstadt. Because his mother spoke French to him and he had an English governess, he grew up trilingual.

Among the visitors entertained at Heiligenberg were Battenberg's relations, the Russian imperial family and his cousin, Prince Louis of Hesse. Influenced by his cousin's wife, Princess Alice, a daughter of Queen Victoria, and by Prince Alfred, another of Queen Victoria's children, Battenberg became a naturalised British subject and joined the Royal Navy on 3 October 1868 at age fourteen. He was admitted by the Board of Admiralty without the production of a medical certificate, which was contrary to the usual regulation. He had been found medically unfit "on account of small, flat chest, slight lateral curvature of the spine and defective vision", but was allowed to join so as not to disappoint the Queen. He was entered as a naval cadet aboard HMS Victory, Nelson's old flagship, then used as a permanently moored receiving ship.

In January of the following year, the Prince and Princess of Wales cruised the Mediterranean and Black Seas in the frigate HMS Ariadne; and the Prince of Wales requested that Louis be appointed to the vessel, before his training was complete. As part of the same tour, Louis accompanied them on a visit to Egypt, where they visited the construction site of the Suez Canal. As was traditional, the Khedive, Isma'il Pasha, bestowed honours on the party, with Louis receiving the Order of the Medjidie (4th Class); in April, he received the Order of Osmanieh (4th Class) from Ottoman Sultan Abdulaziz.

== Early naval career ==
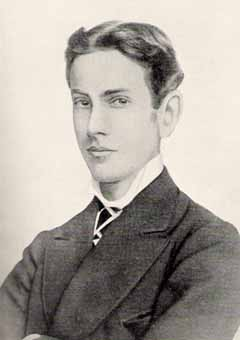
Portrait of Prince Louis by Backofen in Darmstadt, 1869

Louis returned to Britain in May 1869. In June he joined HMS Royal Alfred, the flagship of the North America and West Indies Station, becoming a midshipman in October. From June to September 1870 he took leave in Germany, coinciding with the Franco-Prussian War, but he spent the next three-and-a-half years in the Americas (Bermuda and Halifax, Nova Scotia), where his tour of duty served to make up for the training he had missed while posted with the Prince of Wales on the Ariadne. Returning to Europe in early 1874, he was placed on the books of HMS Excellent at Portsmouth, and passed the sub-lieutenant's examinations—gaining the best marks ever recorded at seamanship and joint best-ever at gunnery.

In 1875, again at the invitation of the Prince of Wales, he joined HMS Serapis, which conducted the Prince on an official tour of India, 1875–76. Louis sketched some of the events of the tour and his drawings were published in the Illustrated London News. He was promoted to lieutenant on 15 May 1876. The Prince asked Louis to stay with him at Marlborough House for the summer of 1876, but wishing to gain further experience at sea, Louis instead accepted an offer to join Prince Alfred, Duke of Edinburgh, as a lieutenant on board HMS Sultan. In addition to acting as the Duke's equerry, Louis continued his naval duties. He did not enjoy the position, as the Duke was rather touchy and Louis's cabin was infested with rats, one of which he caught with his bare hands as it ran across his chest as he lay in bed. The Sultan toured the Mediterranean from July 1876.

In late February–early March 1878, Louis was still serving on the Sultan as it lay in the Bosphorus during the Russo-Turkish War. He was criticised for visiting his brother, Prince Alexander, who was serving with the Russian forces, but an investigation cleared both Louis and Alexander, as well as Prince Alfred, of any wrongdoing. For the next two years Louis served on HMS Agincourt and on the Royal Yacht, HMY Osborne, but in October 1879 he refused further service on the Royal Yacht, saying it was damaging his professional career, and requested half-pay until he could be given an active duty. On 17 February 1880 he, his father, and Tsar Alexander II witnessed an explosion at the Winter Palace in Saint Petersburg, when Stephen Chalturin unsuccessfully attempted to assassinate the Tsar with dynamite beneath the great dining room.

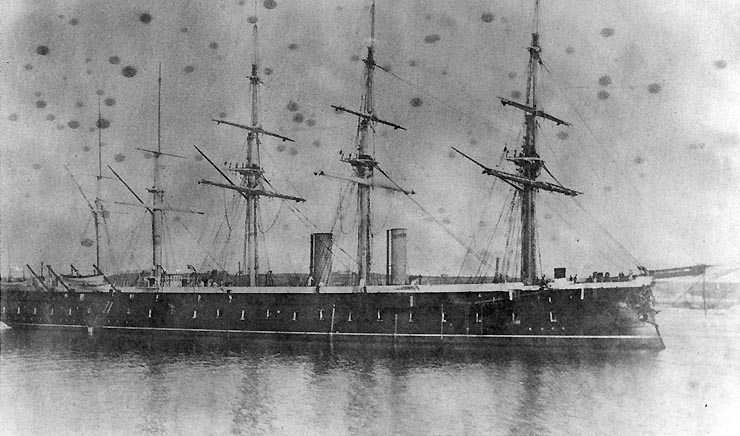
HMS Agincourt, c. 1878

On 24 August 1880, Louis was posted to HMS Inconstant, the flagship of the Flying Squadron, which included HMS Bacchante on which Princes Albert Victor and George were serving. The ship sailed to South America, South Africa, Australia, Fiji, Japan, China, Hong Kong, Singapore and the Dutch East Indies, before returning to South Africa in April 1882. Seven months after Louis left Britain on the voyage, actress Lillie Langtry allegedly bore him an illegitimate daughter, Jeanne Marie. Langtry was also a one-time mistress of the Prince of Wales. Jeanne Marie's parentage was never completely verified, but Louis made a financial settlement nonetheless.

From South Africa the Inconstant sailed to St Helena, and the Cape Verde Islands, where the squadron received orders to proceed to Gibraltar, and from there to Malta and Egypt to take part in the Anglo-Egyptian War. On 11 July 1882, Alexandria was bombarded and in the next two weeks Louis served in the Flying Squadron delivering shells and ammunition to the battle fleet, and then as a guard to the Khedive at Ras El Tin Palace. He was decorated with the Egypt Medal by Queen Victoria personally.

In November 1882, he left the Inconstant, spent Christmas in Darmstadt, and in March the following year visited his younger brother, Prince Alexander, in Bulgaria. Alexander had been made Sovereign Prince of Bulgaria in 1879 with the approval of Europe's Great Powers. Louis accompanied his brother on a state visit to the Ottoman Empire, and then on a tour of Cyprus and the Holy Land with the Ottoman Navy, during which Louis was appalled at the lack of seamanship—the Turkish captains were unable to navigate and had to hug the coast so as not to get lost; when they did leave the coast they became so disoriented that they were unable to steer for Jaffa. On its return journey the ship on which they had travelled ran aground.

== Marriage and family ==
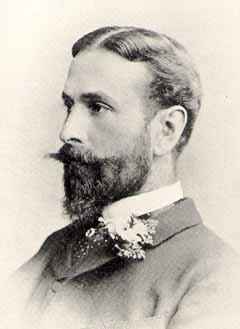
Prince Louis photographed by Elliott & Fry in London, 1884

In September 1883, Queen Victoria appointed him to her yacht, HMY Victoria and Albert (1855). On 30 April 1884 at Darmstadt in the presence of the Queen, Prince Louis married her granddaughter, Princess Victoria of Hesse and by Rhine. His wife was the eldest daughter of Queen Victoria's second daughter Princess Alice and Louis IV, Grand Duke of Hesse. Through the Hesse family, Prince and Princess Louis of Battenberg were first cousins once removed. They had known each other since childhood, and invariably spoke English to each other. As wedding presents Louis received the British Order of the Bath and the Star and Chain of the Hessian Order of Louis.

Louis and Victoria had four children:

Name	Birth	Death	Notes
Alice	25 February 1885	5 December 1969	Married 1903, to Prince Andrew of Greece and Denmark; had issue, including Prince Philip, Duke of Edinburgh.
Louise	13 July 1889	7 March 1965	Married 1923, to Gustaf VI Adolf of Sweden (making this his second marriage); one stillborn daughter.
George	6 November 1892	8 April 1938	Married 1916, to Countess Nadejda Mikhailovna de Torby (daughter of Grand Duke Michael Mikhailovich of Russia); had issue.
Louis	25 June 1900	27 August 1979	Married 1922, to Edwina Cynthia Annette Ashley; had issue.

In 1885, one of Louis's younger brothers, Prince Henry of Battenberg, married Princess Beatrice, the youngest child of Queen Victoria, and took up residence with the Queen in Britain so that Beatrice could continue to serve as her mother's companion and personal secretary.

== Commander ==
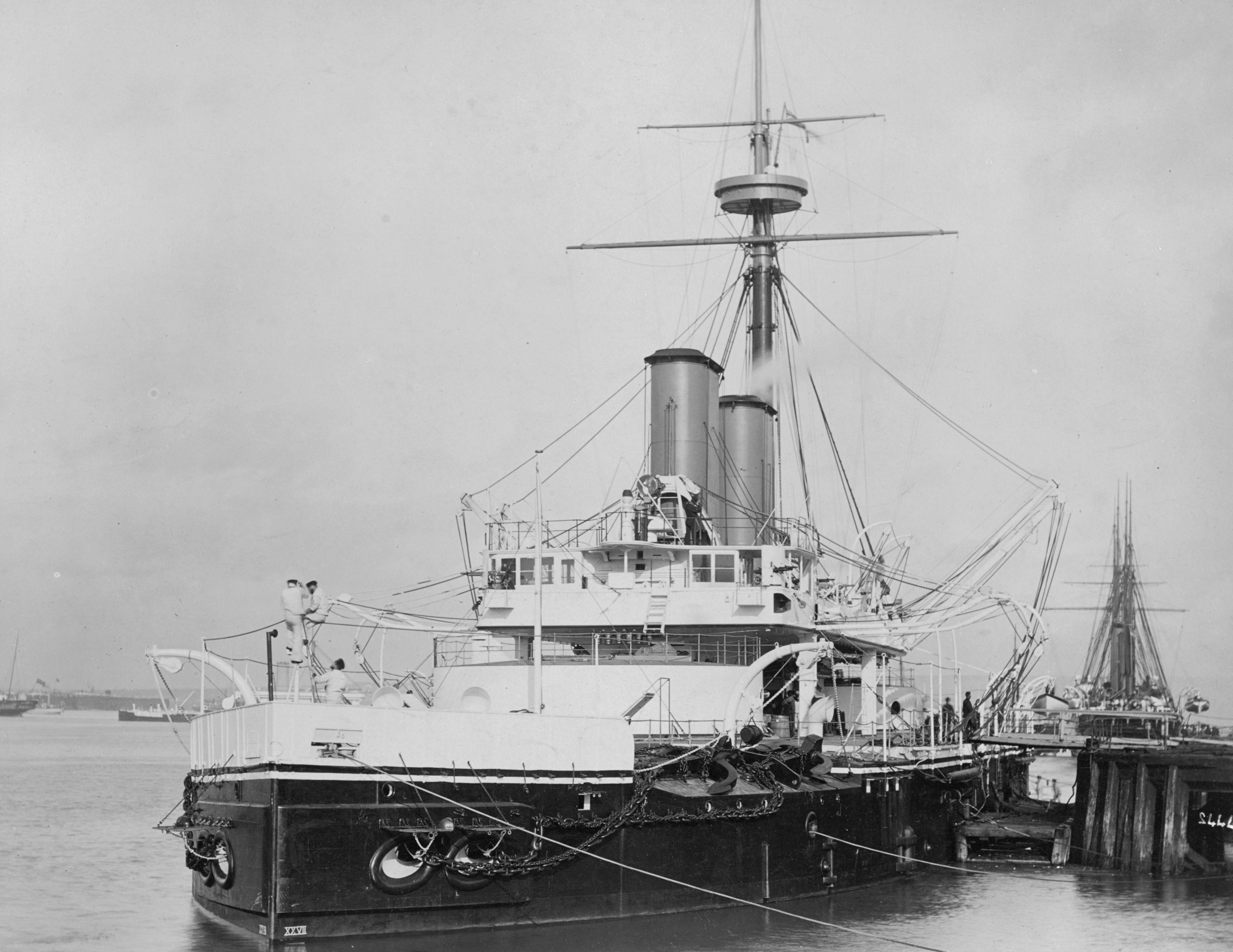
HMS Dreadnought, c. 1894

On his penultimate day aboard the Queen's yacht, 30 August 1885, Louis was promoted to the rank of commander. The next four years were spent in the shore establishments HMS Excellent and HMS Vernon on half-pay, on HMS Cambridge, very briefly at Milford Haven in August 1886, and on board HMS Dreadnought in the Mediterranean. Irish nationalist Member of Parliament (MP) Willie Redmond and Liberal MP Charles Conybeare both questioned Battenberg's appointment to Dreadnought in the British House of Commons. Conybeare asked, "What special qualifications have entitled a foreigner to be promoted over the heads of some 30 British officers?" First Lord of the Admiralty Lord George Hamilton said, "Captain Stephenson, who commands the Dreadnought, applied for Prince Louis of Battenberg to fill the appointment. I may add that another officer who is about to command a large iron-clad in the Mediterranean has made a similar application." He added that 22 commanders junior to Battenberg held similar appointments, and that Battenberg was a naturalised British subject. Another Liberal MP, Edward Pickersgill, backed up by Conybeare and Irish nationalist Charles Tanner, questioned the propriety of Battenberg's appointment to the Navy in 1868, given Battenberg's failure to get the required medical certificate, and suggested that he only got in the Navy because of royal favour.

On 3 October 1889, Battenberg was appointed to his first independent command, HMS Scout, a torpedo-cruiser, which saw service in the Red Sea.

== Captain ==
On 31 December 1891, Prince Louis was promoted to the rank of captain. At the beginning of the following year, he was appointed naval advisor to the inspector-general of fortifications. His role was to act as a liaison between the navy and the army in order to ensure a co-ordinated defence. Traditionally, there was a great deal of friction between the two services, but Louis exercised his social skills in the role, leading Prince George, Duke of Cambridge, to write to him, "You have produced a mutual feeling of goodwill and unanimity which I have always wished to see established, and which, by your tact and sound judgement, you have brought about to the fullest extent."

In 1892, Battenberg invented the Battenberg Course Indicator, an analogue computer device used by seamen to determine course and speed to steer for changes of position between ships.

By February 1894 his role was further developed when he was appointed joint secretary of the naval and military committee on defence, which was later renamed the Committee of Imperial Defence. Louis captained HMS Cambrian in the Mediterranean Fleet from October 1894 to May 1897 and HMS Majestic in the Channel Fleet from June 1897. His careful study of both naval and military defence, as well as its interaction, led to his appointment as assistant director of the Naval Intelligence in June 1899. He used his relationships with the royal houses of Europe to gather intelligence on the naval fleets of other nations, which he passed on to the Admiralty in full and detailed reports. He became an aide-de-camp to the Queen in 1897, a post he would retain under both King Edward VII and King George V.

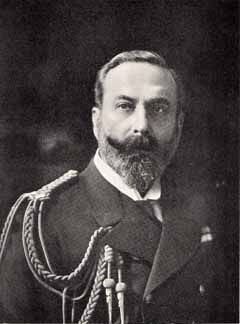
Prince Louis photographed by Carl Vandyk of London, 1905

He commissioned the newly built battleship HMS Implacable on 10 September 1901, and served as its captain for a year in the Mediterranean, during which he spectacularly defeated a larger opposing force in a naval exercise. When the Second-in-Command of the Mediterranean Fleet, Rear-Admiral Burges Watson, died suddenly in late September 1902, Louis was temporarily appointed 2nd class Commodore with added responsibilities. In November of the same year he was appointed as Director of Naval Intelligence, an apt posting for a man whom First Lord of the Admiralty William Palmer, 2nd Earl of Selborne, described as "the cleverest sailor I have met yet". The outgoing Director, Rear-Admiral Reginald Custance, had been Battenberg’s superior at the Naval Intelligence Department a few years earlier and tried to prevent Battenberg’s promotion to succeed him.

== Admiral ==
He was promoted to rear admiral on 1 July 1904, in which year his family connections to the royal courts of Europe helped resolve the Dogger Bank incident peacefully. The following February, he was given command of the 2nd Cruiser Squadron, with HMS Drake as his flagship. During a successful two years the squadron visited Greece, Portugal, Canada, and the United States, where the American press commented favourably on Prince Louis's courtesy, unassuming manner and democratic nature. After two years at the head of the Second Cruiser Squadron, and further visits to Spain (where his niece Victoria Eugenie of Battenberg was Queen), he was appointed second-in-command of the Mediterranean Fleet as acting vice-admiral with HMS Venerable as his flagship.

After less than six months in post his flag was transferred to the battleship Prince of Wales in August 1907. The following year, he was promoted to vice-admiral, and appointed as Commander-in-Chief, Atlantic Fleet. Historian Andrew Lambert described Battenberg as a sea-going admiral as "more cerebral than the average, although somewhat lazy. The [fleet] exercises had a greater sense of realism, reflecting the latest thinking on weapons and strategy." In 1909, he published a translation of Commander Vladimir Semenoff's Rasplata (The Reckoning), a memoir of the Russo-Japanese War of 1904–05, and witnessed the first crossing of the English Channel by air by Louis Blériot. He was appointed as commander of the newly constituted Third and Fourth Divisions of the Home Fleet two years later. The years immediately preceding this appointment were marred by disagreements between Admirals Sir John Fisher and Lord Charles Beresford over the direction of the navy and the imposition of reforms. Louis largely supported Fisher's modernising efforts, although he disapproved of his methods, and as a result Fisher's opponents attempted to prevent Louis's promotions.

== Sea Lord ==
Fisher recommended Louis as First Sea Lord in 1911: "He is the most capable administrator in the Admirals List by a long way", but elements of the British press were against his appointment on the grounds that he was a German. Horatio Bottomley said it was "a crime against our Empire to trust our secrets of National Defence to any alien-born official". In December 1911, Louis did return to the Admiralty but as Second rather than First Sea Lord. As Second Sea Lord, Louis pushed through improvements in working conditions for the ratings, and created an Admiralty War Staff that would prepare the navy's plans in case of war. He was promoted to full admiral on 13 July 1912.

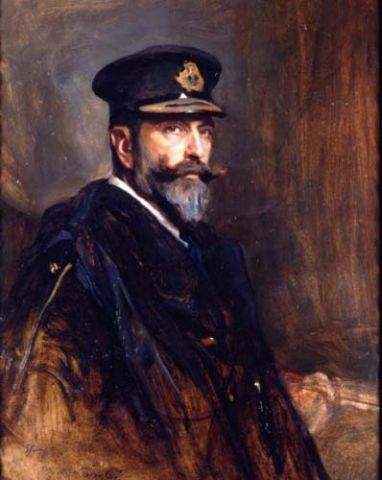
Portrait by Philip de László, 1910

However, almost a year to the day later, on 8 December 1912, Battenberg assumed the post of First Sea Lord in succession to Admiral Sir Francis Bridgeman. Military historian Hew Strachan contends that Battenberg "lacked Fisher's dogmatism. Not the least of his attractions to Churchill was his malleability. The combination of frequent change and weak appointees ensured that the professional leadership of the Royal Navy lost its direction in the four years preceding the war. Power now lay with the service's civilian head ... Winston Churchill." Late in 1913 Battenberg (according to draft notes in Churchill's papers) gave what historian Nicholas Lambert describes as "uncharacteristically fierce resistance" to Churchill's suggestion of appointing his former superior Reginald Custance to the post of Chief of Naval War Staff (Doveton Sturdee was appointed instead). Jack Sandars, Arthur Balfour’s former political secretary, at one point recorded that his many sources at the Admiralty complained of Battenberg’s subservience to Churchill and that his nickname was "Quite Concur" after the words which he often wrote on Churchill’s memos.

As First Sea Lord, Battenberg was responsible to the First Lord for the readiness of the fleet and the preparation of naval strategy, as well as the development of a scheme for state insurance of merchant vessels in times of war, which was to prove essential in preventing prohibitive insurance rates that would have stifled British trade.

On the eve of the World War, Churchill and Battenberg made the crucial decision to cancel the scheduled dispersal of the British fleet following practice manoeuvres, to preserve the Royal Navy's battle readiness. In the view of Andrew Lambert, "While Churchill planned to recall Fisher if war broke out, he missed the chance to prevent war that might have been provided by drafting him earlier. No Cabinet advised by Fisher would have made such a blundering, incompetent, disastrous response to the July Crisis. The British trumpet gave a very uncertain note in July [1914], allowing the Germans to delude themselves that Britain might be neutral ... the contrast in habits between the energy and enthusiasm of the young First Lord and the lackadaisical habits of the First Sea Lord Prince Louis of Battenberg made Fisher's recall all but inevitable."

Upon the outbreak of war, gout began to cause Battenberg considerable pain, and the naval staff he had set up did not function as well as it ought to have done. On 6 August 1914 Battenberg and the French Deputy Chief of Staff of the Navy Antoine Schwerer signed a convention in London on the division of responsibilities between the two navies. The convention confirmed the terms of the Entente Cordiale, and placed France in command of all naval operations in the Mediterranean. Malta and Gibraltar would both be treated as French naval bases. In the event that Austria-Hungary entered the war France would act against its naval forces, and would at minimum prevent them passing the Strait of Otranto.

Anti-German sentiment rose among the British public, in newspapers, and in elite gentlemen's clubs, where resentment was inflamed by Admiral Lord Charles Beresford despite Churchill's remonstrances. Driven by public opinion, Churchill asked Prince Louis to resign as First Sea Lord on 27 October 1914. When acceptance of Battenberg's resignation was delayed by the King's opposition to the appointment of Fisher in his place, Louis wrote to Churchill, "I beg of you to release me. I am on the verge of breaking down & I cannot use my brain for anything." On 13 November he wrote to Churchill's Naval Secretary, Rear-Admiral Horace Hood, "It was an awful wrench, but I had no choice from the moment it was made clear to me that the Government did not feel themselves strong enough to support me by some public pronouncement". Churchill later told George Riddell (Diary 29 April 1915) that Battenberg had been "very lethargic". He was also critical of Doveton Sturdee "not a good Chief of Staff. He is a good fighting admiral but not a clever man."

His resignation was announced amid an outpouring of appreciation from politicians and naval comrades. Battenberg had written to Churchill on 28 October, "What I shd (sic) value above all else is to be admitted to the Privy Council". The King later swore Louis in as a Privy Councillor in a public show of support. Labour party politician and trade union leader J. H. Thomas wrote to The Times: "I desire to express my extreme regret at the announcement that Prince Louis of Battenberg has, by his resignation, pandered to the most mean and contemptible slander I have ever known ... I was simply astounded to hear the base suggestions and rumours current, and I am afraid that his action will simply be looked upon as a triumph for the mean and miserable section of people, who, at a time of national trial, is ever ready to pass a foul lie from lip to lip without a tittle of evidence". Admiral of the Fleet Lord John Hay thought that the "ingeniously propagated lies" originated from Germany.

Prince Louis held no official post for the remainder of the war and lived in retirement at Kent House on the Isle of Wight. He occupied his time in writing a comprehensive encyclopaedia on naval medals published in three large volumes, which became the standard reference work on the subject. His naval career had been characterised by industry, invention and intellect; he introduced mechanical calculators to compute navigations and a cone signalling apparatus. Although assured that he would be returned to command post-war, on 9 December 1918 the First Sea Lord, Admiral Sir Rosslyn Wemyss, wrote to Prince Louis informing him that he would not be employed again and suggested that he might retire in order to facilitate the promotion of younger officers. Prince Louis agreed, and he officially retired on 1 January 1919 "at [his] own request", shortly before reaching the mandatory retirement age of 65.

== Adoption of the surname Mountbatten ==
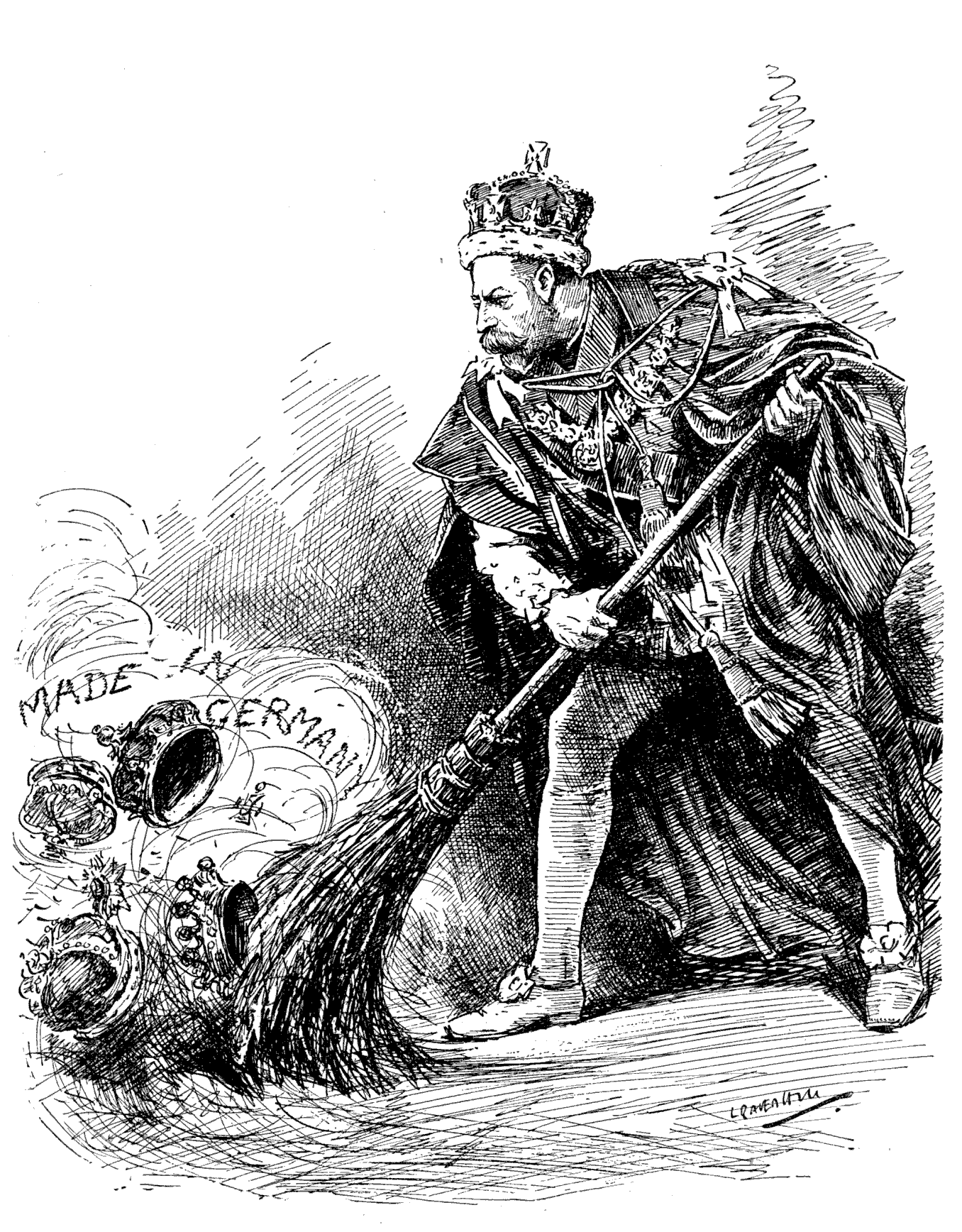
Punch cartoon depicting King George V sweeping away the German titles held by members of his family, 1917

During the war, persistent rumours that the British royal family must be pro-German, given their dynastic origins and many German relatives, prompted the King to abandon his subsidiary German dynastic titles and adopt an English surname. At the behest of the King, Louis relinquished the title Prince of Battenberg in the Grand Duchy of Hesse, along with the style of Serene Highness, on 14 July 1917. At the same time, Louis anglicised his family name, changing it from "Battenberg" to "Mountbatten", having considered but rejected "Battenhill" as an alternative. On 7 November, the King created him Marquess of Milford Haven, Earl of Medina, and Viscount Alderney in the peerage of the United Kingdom. He was offered a dukedom by George V, but declined as he could not afford the lavish lifestyle expected of a duke.

The King's British relatives in the Teck, Schleswig-Holstein, and Gleichen families underwent similar changes. Louis's wife ceased to use her own title of Princess of Hesse and became known as the Marchioness of Milford Haven. His three younger children ceased to use their princely titles and assumed courtesy titles as children of a British marquess; his eldest daughter, Princess Alice, had married into the Greek Royal Family in 1903, and never had occasion to use the surname Mountbatten. However, her only son, Prince Philip of Greece and Denmark, adopted the name when he became a British subject in 1947.

While the transition in names and titles was being effected, Louis spent some time at the home of his eldest son, George. After anglicising his surname to Mountbatten and becoming Marquess of Milford Haven, Louis wrote in his son's guestbook, "Arrived Prince Hyde, Departed Lord Jekyll".

== Final years and death ==
During the war, two of Lord Milford Haven's sisters-in-law (Empress Alexandra Feodorovna and Grand Duchess Elizabeth Feodorovna) were killed by the Bolsheviks in Russia. Eventually, in January 1921, after a long and convoluted journey, the body of Grand Duchess Elizabeth Fyodorovna was interred in Jerusalem in the presence of Milford Haven and his wife.

In 1919, the Milford Havens had to give up their home, Kent House, for financial reasons. He sold his collection of naval medals. All of his financial investments in Russia were seized by the Bolsheviks and his German property became valueless with the collapse of the mark. He sold Heiligenberg Castle, which he had inherited from his father, in 1920.

Milford Haven was appointed Military Knight Grand Cross of the Order of the Bath (GCB), to add to the Civil one he already held, in recognition of his service to the Royal Navy in the 1921 New Year Honours, and was specially promoted by Order in Council to the rank of Admiral of the Fleet on the Retired List, dated 19 August. A few days later he joined HMS Repulse, the ship on which his son Louis was serving, for a week at the invitation of the captain Dudley Pound. It was his last voyage; he died at 42 Half Moon Street, Piccadilly, London in the annexe of the Naval and Military Club on 11 September 1921 of heart failure following influenza, aged 67. After a funeral service at Westminster Abbey, his remains were buried at St. Mildred's Church, Whippingham, on the Isle of Wight.

Milford Haven's estate comprised £6,535 in England and 734,613 marks in Darmstadt. His elder son, George Mountbatten, who had received the courtesy title Earl of Medina, succeeded him as 2nd Marquess of Milford Haven. Louis's younger son, styled Lord Louis Mountbatten after 1917, served in the Royal Navy, became First Sea Lord like his father, was the last Viceroy of India, and was created Earl Mountbatten of Burma in 1947.

== Titles, styles, honours and arms ==
=== Titles and styles ===
- 24 May 1854 – 26 December 1858: His Illustrious Highness Count Louis of Battenberg
- 26 December 1858 – 14 July 1917: His Serene Highness Prince Louis of Battenberg
- 14 July – 7 November 1917: The Right Honourable Sir Louis Mountbatten
- 7 November 1917 – 11 September 1921: The Most Honourable The Marquess of Milford Haven

=== Orders and decorations ===
- United Kingdom of Great Britain and Ireland:
  - Egypt War Medal, 1882
  - Knight Commander of the Bath, 29 April 1884 (civil)/25 June 1909 (military); Additional Knight Grand Cross with Collar, 21 June 1887 (civil)/1 January 1921 (military)
  - Queen Victoria Golden Jubilee Medal, 1887
  - Knight of Justice of St. John
  - Knight Grand Cross of the Royal Victorian Order, 2 February 1901
  - King Edward VII Coronation Medal, 1902
  - Knight Commander of St Michael and St George, 30 June 1905
- Hesse and by Rhine:
  - Grand Cross of the Ludwig Order, 25 September 1870; with Star and Collar, 29 April 1884
  - Grand Cross of the Merit Order of Philip the Magnanimous, with Swords, 25 September 1870
  - Knight of the Golden Lion, with Collar, 30 April 1884
  - Wedding Medal of Grand Duke Ernst Ludwig and Grand Duchess Victoria Melita, 1894
- (Austrian Empire) (Kingdom of Hungary) Austria-Hungary:
  - Grand Cross of the Order of Franz Joseph, 1877
  - Grand Cross of the Imperial Order of Leopold, 1908
- Principality of Bulgaria:
  - Grand Cross of St. Alexander
  - Commemorative Medal for the Liberation of Bulgaria
- Egypt:
  - Order of the Medjidie, 4th Class, January 1869
  - Khedive's Star, 1882
- (Saxe-Coburg and Gotha) (Duchy of Saxe-Altenburg) (Saxe-Meiningen) Ernestine duchies: Grand Cross of the Saxe-Ernestine House Order
- French Third Republic: Grand Cross of the Legion of Honour, 20 July 1913
- Greece: Grand Cross of the Redeemer
- Empire of Japan: Grand Cordon of the Rising Sun, with Paulownia Flowers, 2 November 1917
- Principality of Montenegro: Grand Cross of the Order of Prince Danilo I
- Ottoman Empire: Order of Osmanieh, 4th Class, April 1869; 1st Class, 1882
- Kingdom of Portugal:
  - Grand Cross of the Royal Military Order of Our Lord Jesus Christ
  - Grand Cross of the Tower and Sword, with Collar
- Kingdom of Prussia: Grand Cross of the Red Eagle
- Russian Empire:
  - Knight of St. Anna, 1st Class
  - Knight of St. Andrew, 1909
  - Knight of St. Alexander Nevsky
  - Knight of the White Eagle
  - Knight of St. Stanislaus, 1st Class
- Restoration (Spain):
  - Grand Cross of the Order of Charles III, 26 November 1906
  - Grand Cross of Naval Merit, with White Decoration, 1907
- Württemberg: Grand Cross of the Württemberg Crown, 1884

=== Appointments ===
- Honorary naval aide-de-camp to the Sovereign, 1 January 1897
- Privy Councillor, 5 November 1914

=== Arms ===
Coat of arms of Prince Louis of Battenberg
Coronet A Coronet of a Marquess Crest 1st: Out of a Coronet Or two Horns barry of ten Argent and Gules issuing from each three Linden Leaves Vert and from the outer side of each horn four Branches barwise having three like Leaves pendent therefrom of the last (Hesse); 2nd: Out of a Coronet Or a Plume of four Ostrich Feathers alternately Argent and Sable (Battenberg) Escutcheon Quarterly: 1st and 4th, Azure a Lion rampant double-queued barry of ten Argent and Gules armed and langued of the last crowned Or within a Bordure compony of the second and third (Hesse); 2nd and 3rd, Argent two Pallets Sable (Battenberg) Supporters On either side a Lion double-queued and crowned all Or Motto In Honour Bound Orders The shield is surrounded by the heraldic circlet of the Order of the Bath, which bears the order's motto, and suspended below the shield is the insignia of the order

== Notes and citations ==
Military offices
New title Ship commissioned	Captain of HMS Implacable; 1901–1902	Succeeded by Reginald Prothero
Preceded by Reginald Custance	Director of Naval Intelligence; 1902–1905	Succeeded by Charles Ottley
New title Squadron formed	Rear-Admiral Commanding Second Cruiser Squadron; 1905–1907	Succeeded by Charles Henry Adair
Preceded by Francis Bridgeman	Second-in-Command Mediterranean Fleet; 1907–1908	Succeeded by George Callaghan
Preceded by Sir Assheton Curzon-Howe	Commander-in-Chief Atlantic Fleet; 1908–1910	Succeeded by Sir John Jellicoe
Preceded by Sir George Egerton	Second Sea Lord; 1911–1912	Succeeded by Sir John Jellicoe
Preceded by Sir Francis Bridgeman	First Sea Lord; 1912–1914	Succeeded by The Lord Fisher
Peerage of the United Kingdom
New creation	Marquess of Milford Haven; 1917–1921	Succeeded by George Mountbatten
