= William Cousins =

William Cousins may refer to:

- William Cousins (judge) (1927–2018), American lawyer, judge, and member of the Chicago City Council
- William Edward Cousins (1902–1988), American Roman Catholic archbishop
- William J. Cousins (1924–2013), American sociologist
- William Roy Cousins (1881–1976), American politician
