= Craig Custance =

Craig Custance is Head of Creative Development at The Athletic. Previously, he was an editorial director at The Athletic where he managed the NHL, MLB and college football groups. He is the author of The Franchise: The Business of Building Winning Teams, released by Simon and Schuster Canada in 2024. Before joining The Athletic, he was a national hockey writer for ESPN and ESPN The Magazine from 2011 to 2017 and Sporting News from 2008 to 2011. He also covered the Atlanta Thrashers for the Atlanta Journal-Constitution. On May 26, 2017, Custance announced he was leaving ESPN. On June 19, 2017, he announced via Twitter that he would be joining The Athletic to launch their new Detroit division.

Custance graduated from Michigan State University in 1999. He lives in Clinton Township, Michigan, with his wife and three children. His first book Behind the Bench: Inside the Minds of Hockey's Greatest Coaches (Triumph Books) was released in October 2017. He was also host of The Full 60 podcast.
