= Cousins, Alberta =

Cousins, Alberta may refer to:

- Cousins, Medicine Hat, a locality in Medicine Hat, Alberta
- Cousins, Provost No. 52, Alberta, a locality in Provost No. 52, Alberta
