= Cussen =

Cussen is a surname in the English and Irish languages. In English, it is generally described as a matronymic, derived from the Middle English Cust, a pet name for Custance, and son, as in 'son of Cust'. In Irish, the surname is likely a variant of "Cousin", which is derived from the Middle English cusin or cosin, meaning 'kinsman or cousin'.

Notable people with the surname include:

- Cliodhna Cussen, Irish sculptor married to activist and writer Pádraig Ó Snodaigh, and mother of Aengus Ó Snodaigh
- Laurence Cussen (1843–1903), New Zealand surveyor
- Leo Cussen (1859–1933), Australian judge
- Michael Cussen (born 1984), Irish hurler

== See also ==
- Cousin (disambiguation)
- Cussans
