= Germaine Cousin-Zermatten =

Swiss herbalist and author (1925–2026)

- Born: 22 April 1925; Saint-Martin, Valais, Switzerland
- Died: 4 January 2026 (aged 100)
- Occupations: Herbalist and author
- Website: Official website

Germaine Cousin-Zermatten (22 April 1925 – 4 January 2026) was a Swiss herbalist and author who, following personal research aimed to compile an ancestral knowledge only transmitted orally, wrote several books devoted to the phytotherapeutic properties of medicinal plants located in the Val d’Hérens region. She died on 4 January 2026, at the age of 100.

== Works ==
- Germaine Cousin-Zermatten (1995). Recettes santé de nos grand-mères. Archives vivantes (in French). Cabédita. ISBN 2882952430.

- German version: Germaine Cousin-Zermatten (1997). Gesundheitsrezepte unserer Grossmütter [Recettes santé de nos grand-mères] (in German). Translated by Marliese Peiser. Illustrated by Jeanne Covillot. Monographic. ISBN 2883410801. OCLC 81770433.

- Germaine Cousin-Zermatten (2005). Cataplasmes, compresses, bains de pieds et bains de mains: Recueil de recettes essentiellement constituées à base de plantes pour réaliser cataplasmes, pommades, compresses et ainsi soulager de nombreux maux tels que rages de dents, sinusites, crises de foie, toux, etc. Regard et connaissance (in French). Cabédita. ISBN 2882954476. OCLC 427916867.
- Germaine Cousin-Zermatten (2006). Tisanes bienfaisantes: au gré des saisons et des âges. Archives gourmandes (in French). Cabédita. ISBN 2882954778.
- Germaine Cousin-Zermatten; Raymond Cousin (2009). Saveur et vertus des plantes sauvages: recettes et teintures. Regard et connaissance (in French). Illustrated by Jeanne Covillot; Sabine Rey. Yens sur Morges: Ed. Cabédita. ISBN 978-2882953834. OCLC 1040875738.
- Germaine Cousin-Zermatten (2009) [2005]. Liqueurs, apéritifs et sirops: recettes à l'ancienne. Archives gourmandes (in French). Bière: Cabédita. ISBN 978-2882954398. OCLC 997425169.
- Germaine Cousin-Zermatten (2009). La cuisine des prés et des champs: la table au naturel. Archives gourmandes (in French). Cabédita. ISBN 978-2882955432.
- Germaine Cousin-Zermatten (2010). Les bonnes soupes de nos grands-mères: saines et vivifiantes. Archives gourmandes (in French). Bière: Cabedita. ISBN 978-2882955982. OCLC 722954146.
- Germaine Cousin-Zermatten; Raymond Cousin (2013). Les remèdes de Grand'mère ne se perdront pas... (in French). St-Martin: Ed. Santissa. ISBN 978-2839912006. OCLC 999735001.
- Germaine Cousin-Zermatten (2014) [2000]. Les pouvoirs de la lune: sagesse populaire et astuces lunaires éprouvées au fil du temps (in French). Reprinted in 2001, 2004, 2009, 2010, 2012. St-Martin: Ed. Santissa. ISBN 978-2839914062. OCLC 999735001.

== Sources ==
=== Bibliography ===
- Sandrine Fattebert Karrab. "La Valaisanne superstar chez les Belges: Invitée pour présenter ses remèdes et recettes de grand-mère, Germaine Cousin a conquis Bruxelles. Elle a même été reçue par... Micheline Calmy-Rey". Générations plus: Bien vivre son âge (in French). Issued in November 2011, 16 July 2014, 19 August 2014. OCLC 1033857401.
- Lia Rosso, responsable éditoriale; Christophe Ungar, journaliste scientifique; Joëlle Houriet, consultante scientifique; Germaine Cousin-Zermatten, herboriste; Christine Immelé, graphiste (2019). Les remèdes de grand-mère sous la loupe médicale (in French). D’après une idée originale de l’émission 36.9° de la Radio Télévision Suisse, avec le soutien de l’université de Genève. Léchelles: Rosso éditions. OCLC 1176184565. "À travers treize remèdes ancestraux, la valaisanne Germaine Cousin nous emmène avec humour et rigueur dans l'univers des plantes qui soignent, alors que Joëlle Houriet, pharmacienne, docteure ès sciences, spécialisée en phytochimie, détaille les connaissances scientifiques pour chaque potion."

=== Radio document ===
- Paul Burnet, Germaine Cousin-Zermatten, Henriette Crettaz-Maistre, Lina Chevrier, Marie Maître, Yolande Métrailler, Denise Beytrison, Lucienne Chevrier (1959–1970). Un trésor national, nos patois. Archives sonores des parlers patois de la Suisse romande et des régions voisines (in French). Lausanne: Radio suisse romande. OCLC 716955192. "Le chien de la Chachille, conte d'auteur inconnu, interprété par Germaine Cousin-Zermatten de Saint-Martin, Valais; Lè chés dè Bèndelyon / Les rochers de Bindillon, conte d'auteur inconnu, interprété par Germaine Cousin-Zermatten, de Saint-Martin, Valais; Quand j'étais jeune fille, poème de et par Germaine Cousin-Zermatten, de Saint-Martin, Valais."

=== Videography ===
- Manuelle Pernoud, journaliste-présentatrice; Marc Régnier, directeur de l'école de plantes médicinales Alchemille (Evolène); Dr Thierry Buclin, pharmacoloque au CHUV (Lausanne); Drs Brigitte Zirbs-Savigny & Nathalie Calame, médecins FMH; Germaine Cousin-Zermatten (17 November 2009). "Remèdes de grand-mère: potions thérapeutiques ou pur folklore ?". À bon entendeur (in French). Radio télévision suisse. URL 2
- Jean-Robert Probst, Eric Pannatier (2010). Germaine Cousin: entretien au mayen. Archives vivantes (in French). Cabedita. OCLC 1041966113.
- "Les remèdes de grand-mère: Se soigner avec les plantes. Qu'en dit la science ?". 36.9° (in French). Radio télévision suisse. March–April 2019.
