= Reginald Custance =

Royal Navy Admiral (1847–1935)

Admiral Sir Reginald Custance GCB KCMG CVO
- Born: 20 September 1847
- Died: 30 August 1935 (aged 87)
- Military career
- Allegiance: United Kingdom
- Branch: Royal Navy
- Service years: 1860–1908
- Rank: Admiral
- Commands: HMS Phaeton; HMS Barfleur; HMS Blenheim
- Awards: Knight Grand Cross of the Order of the Bath; Knight Commander of the Order of St Michael and St George; Commander of the Royal Victorian Order

Admiral Sir Reginald Neville Custance, GCB, KCMG, CVO (20 September 1847 – 30 August 1935) was a Royal Navy officer. He was the eldest son of General William Neville Custance CB.

== Naval career ==
Custance joined the Royal Navy in 1860. Promoted to captain on 31 December 1885, he was given command of the cruiser HMS Phaeton in January 1890, of the battleship HMS Barfleur in February 1895 and of the cruiser HMS Blenheim in September 1898. He went on to be Director of Naval Intelligence in March 1899. During his first year as Director, he was promoted to flag rank as a rear-admiral on 1 August 1899. Custance was Prince Louis of Battenberg's superior in the Naval Intelligence Department and tried to prevent Battenberg's promotion to succeed him.

In November 1902 Custance was asked to take the position of Second-in-Command of the Mediterranean Fleet, after the sudden death of Rear-Admiral Burges Watson. He flew his flag on the battleship HMS Venerable, on her first commission. He was promoted to vice-admiral on 20 October 1904. He was appointed Second-in-Command of the Channel Fleet in February 1907.

== Later life ==
Draft notes in Winston Churchill's papers (Churchill was First Lord of the Admiralty at the time) suggest that in late 1913 Custance, who had been unemployed for six years, was considered for the post of Chief of Naval War Staff. Prince Louis of Battenberg, now First Sea Lord but normally subservient to Churchill's wishes, gave what historian Nicholas Lambert describes as “uncharacteristically fierce resistance” to appointing Custance, his former boss. Instead Doveton Sturdee, a former disciple of Custance, was appointed.

Lord Sydenham of Combe (4 October 1916) and Custance (9 October 1916) complained in letters to The Times that Churchill's recent statements (Churchill was out of office at the time) that the German High Seas Fleet was effectively blockaded and that surplus forces should be used in offensive operations (similar to the views of naval theorist Julian Corbett) ignored the importance of seeking a decisive victory over the German Fleet. Sturdee also complained in a private memorandum (24 Nov 1916) that Churchill's policy was “the exact reverse of what he advocated when in office and expressed in public speeches”. Historian Christopher Bell thinks this not quite fair – Churchill had advocated risking old, near-obsolete ships in the attack on the Dardanelles but had never suggested weakening Britain's superiority over Germany in the North Sea. In articles (The London Magazine December 1916 and January 1917) and in a Commons speech (21 February 1917) Churchill continued to argue that seeking a major naval victory over Germany was unrealistic but that Germany was effectively blockaded even if such a blockade now took place from bases further away from the enemy than in Napoleonic times.

== Sources ==
- Lambert, Nicholas (2012). Planning Armageddon: British Economic Warfare and the First World War. Cambridge Massachusetts: Harvard University Press; 1st Edition. ISBN 0-67406-149-7.
- Bell, Christopher (2012). Churchill and Sea Power. Oxford: Oxford University Press. ISBN 0-19969-357-9.

Military offices
| Preceded by Lewis Beaumont | Director of Naval Intelligence; 1899–1902 | Succeeded by Prince Louis of Battenberg |
