= Mark Cousins =

Mark Cousins may refer to:

- Mark Cousins (filmmaker) (born 1965), Northern Irish writer, director and producer
- Mark Cousins (footballer) (born 1987), English goalkeeper
- Mark Cousins (writer) (1947–2020), British intellectual
