= Simon Cusden =

English cricketer and coach

Simon Mark James Cusden (born 21 February 1985) is a former professional cricketer, who now helps high performing individuals and teams prevent and treat wellbeing and performance crisis.

Born in Thanet in Kent,and going to Simon Langton Grammar School For Boys, Cusden played for Kent County Cricket Club between 2004 and 2006. After being released by Kent at the end of the 2006 season he joined Derbyshire but was in turn released by them after making only one first-class appearance during 2007. He played a total of seven first-class matches and six List A matches in his playing career. He represented England Under-19's touring Australia in 2002–2003. In the Under-19s test against Bangladesh in July 2004, Cusden claimed four wickets and was top wicket taker in the test and one day series.

After playing for Elvaston Cricket Club in Derbyshire for two seasons following his release by Derbyshire, Cusden moved to Australia. He set up his own cricket coaching company.

Cusden has spoken of the mental health issues he faced whilst playing and after leaving the professional game. For a time he abused alcohol and attempted to commit suicide on one occasion. The Professional Cricketers' Association Benevolent Fund provided assistance to him after the attempt and he was admitted to a rehabilitation centre to aid his recovery.

Nearly a decade later, Cusden now works as a private coach for senior leaders and high performers who are suffering silently from depression, addiction and suicidal ideation.

Simon lives in Somerset with his wife, Jess and their twin sons – Jupiter and Phoenix.
