= William Neville Custance =

English officer in the Royal Army (1811–1886)

General William Neville Custance CB
- Born: William Neville Custance; 26 October 1811; Woodbridge, Suffolk, England
- Died: 7 February 1886 (aged 74); Fordingbridge, Hampshire, England
- Military career
- Allegiance: United Kingdom
- Branch: British Army
- Service years: 1831–1886
- Rank: General
- Units: 95th Regiment of Foot; 46th (or South Devonshire) Regiment of Foot; 2nd Dragoon Guards (Queen's Bays); 6th Dragoon Guards (Carabineers)
- Commands: 6th Dragoon Guards in India; Commandant of the Cavalry Depots at Canterbury and Maidstone; Colonel of the 11th Hussars (Prince Albert's Own)
- Conflicts: Crimean War Battle of Sebastopol; Indian Rebellion of 1857 Siege of Delhi and other battles
- Awards: Companion of the Order of the Bath (CB); Turkish Order of the Medjidie (5th Class)

General William Neville Custance CB (26 October 1811 – 7 February 1886) was a senior British Army officer, who served initially as an infantry officer but mainly as a cavalry officer. He served in the Crimean War and the Indian Rebellion of 1857 (also known as the Indian Mutiny).

== Family background ==
Custance was born in Woodbridge, Suffolk, to parents Hambleton Thomas Custance and Mary Bower. The Custance family had strong links to Weston Longville in Norfolk. He first married Jane Campbell on 8 June 1837 in Dublin, and they had one daughter. He married Mary Meggison on 18 December 1846 in Catton, Norfolk. They had at least five children (one son and four daughters). He died on 7 February 1886 at his home in Fordingbridge, at the age of 74. On his death he was survived by his second wife who died in 1924. His eldest son was Admiral Sir Reginald Neville Custance.

== Military career ==
William Custance was commissioned as an ensign (by purchase) on 11 October 1831 into the 95th Regiment of Foot, but he then transferred to the 46th (or South Devonshire) Regiment of Foot, who by 1837 were serving on Gibraltar. After commissioning into the infantry he was then promoted as follows: lieutenant (by purchase) on 26 June 1835; captain (by purchase) 16 March 1838; in 1841 he moves from the 46th Regiment of Foot to the 2nd Dragoon Guards (Queen's Bays) and in 1848 is serving with the 6th Dragoon Guards (Carabiniers) in Dundalk; major (by purchase) 16 September 1851 (still in the 6th Dragoon Guards (Carabiniers)); lieutenant colonel 1 August 1856; colonel 19 January 1858; major general 6 March 1868; lieutenant general 1 October 1877 and general 7 September 1880. He became the Regimental Colonel of the 11th Hussars (Prince Albert's Own) on 8 March 1875, a post he held until his death in 1886.

Early on in his career as an infantry officer Custance served on Corfu (19 September 1832 to 17 January 1835) and on Gibraltar (8 September 1840 to 28 Oct 1841).

William Custance served in the Crimean campaign from 14 August 1855, taking part in the Battle of the Chernaya, as well as the siege and fall of Sebastopol. He was awarded the British Crimea Medal with Sebastopol Clasp, the Turkish Order of the Medjidie (5th Class) and Turkish Crimea Medal.

In India he was in command of British cavalry (the Carabiniers (6th Dragoon Guards)) at Meerut at the outbreak of the Indian Rebellion on 10 May 1857, also in the subsequent campaign against rebel Indian leaders and units, including the battles of the Hindon River, on 30 and 31 May 1857 (his mount was killed); then the battle of Budlekaserai (his mount was wounded) and then the siege of Delhi. He commanded the Irregular Cavalry under Sir Hope Grant, at the storming of the city on 14 September 1857. He commanded the Carabiniers and Hodson's Horse at the capture of the fortress of Kanound with 22 guns and treasure. He was also in command of the Carabiniers and 2nd Bengal Fusiliers, surprised the city of Farrukhnagar, taking the Nawab. He next commanded a Wing of the Carabineers in the action of Bunkagaon on 11 October 1858, also three squadrons during the subsequent Central Indian campaign of 1858 focussing on Oudh, including the actions of Mahadipur, Rasoolpur, the advance on and capture of the fortress Mitoudee, the actions of Auygung and Bishwa and he commanded the Carabiniers in pursuit of Tantia Tope for three months through Rajputana and Central India, during which frequently commanded detached Columns. He was personally commended by the Governor General and frequently mentioned in despatches. He was awarded the Indian Mutiny Medal with Clasp, the Brevet rank of Colonel and the CB for his leadership and actions in India during the period 1857 to 1858. The 6th Dragoon Guards would return to the England in 1861.

Back in England on 1 October 1862 Custance took over as Commandant of the Cavalry Depot at Canterbury. In 1865 he is recorded as being back at lieutenant colonel and Commandant of the Cavalry Depot at Maidstone, Kent. He remained on half pay but still affiliated with the 6th Dragoon Guards.
