= HMS Polyphemus =

Three ships of the British Royal Navy have been named HMS Polyphemus, after the Polyphemus of Greek mythology.

- HMS Polyphemus (1782) was a 64-gun third rate launched in 1782, active in the Napoleonic Wars, converted to a powder hulk in 1813 and broken up in 1827.
- HMS Polyphemus (1840) was a wooden paddlewheel sloop launched in 1840 and wrecked off Jutland in 1856.
- HMS Polyphemus (1881) was a torpedo ram in use from 1881 to 1903.
- The Polyphemus class was a semi-submerged torpedo cruiser armed with eight torpedoes, proposed in 1914. There had been an argument about the naval estimates at the start of 1914, with Liberal opinion, including Chancellor of the Exchequer David Lloyd George, objecting to ever-escalating naval expenditure, especially with a general election due within a year or so. Winston Churchill (First Lord of the Admiralty) wanted to substitute 15 submarines for one planned battleship and six Polyphemuses for another. On 24 July 1914 Admiral Doveton Sturdee submitted two memos criticising the high cost of these new ships, as well as their low freeboard (making them unusable in rough seas) and vulnerability to enemy destroyers.
- HMS Polyphemus was to have been a Arethusa-class cruiser. However, this ship was cancelled and reordered as a new Town-class cruiser named as HMS Southampton.
- HMS Polyphemus was to have been an Centaur-class aircraft carrier of 18,300 tons, 650 ft (200 m) long, but was cancelled in October 1945.

== Books ==
- Bell, Christopher (2012). Churchill and Sea Power. Oxford: Oxford University Press. ISBN 0-19969-357-9.
