= Admiral Sullivan =

Admiral Sullivan may refer to:

- Sir Francis Sullivan, 6th Baronet (1834–1906), British Royal Navy admiral
- Paul E. Sullivan (born 1952), U.S. Navy vice admiral
- Timothy S. Sullivan (fl. 1970s–2010s), U.S. Coast Guard rear admiral
- William D. Sullivan (born 1950), U.S. Navy vice admiral

== See also ==
- Bartholomew Sulivan (1810–1890), British Royal Navy admiral
- Thomas Ball Sulivan (1781–1857), British Royal Navy rear admiral
