= Thomas Herbert (Royal Navy officer) =

British Royal Navy officer

Vice-Admiral Sir Thomas Herbert KCB
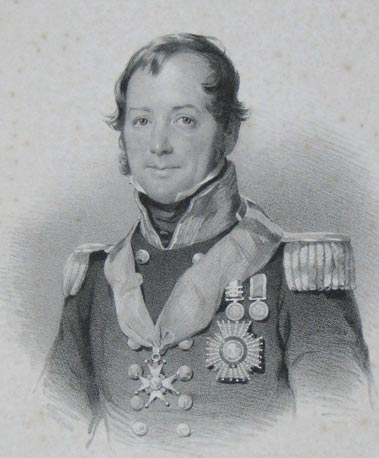
- Born: February 1793; County Kerry, Ireland
- Died: 4 August 1861 (aged 68); Cadogan Place, London, England
- Military career
- Allegiance: United Kingdom
- Branch: Royal Navy
- Rank: Vice-Admiral of the White
- Wars: Napoleonic Wars; War of 1812; First Anglo-Chinese War
- Awards: CB; KCB; China War Medal; Naval General Service Medal

Vice-Admiral Sir Thomas Herbert, KCB (February 1793 – 4 August 1861), was a British Royal Navy officer. He served in the Napoleonic Wars, War of 1812, and First Anglo-Chinese War. From 1847 to 1849, he was commodore of the South East Coast of America Station. Herbert served as Member of Parliament for Dartmouth as a Conservative from 1852 to 1857.

== Early career ==
Herbert was born in County Kerry, Ireland, in February 1793 as the second son of Richard Townsend Herbert, esquire of Cahirnane, County Kerry (where the Herbert family had been seated since the reign of King Charles II), and his wife Jane, daughter of Anthony Stoughton, esquire of Ballyhorgan. Among his ancestors was Sir Richard Herbert of Coldbrook, who was beheaded with his brother William, Earl of Pembroke at Banbury, the day after the Battle of Edgecote Moor on 26 July 1469.

Herbert joined the Royal Navy on 23 July 1803 as a first-class volunteer on board HMS Excellent under Captain Frank Sotheron. In that ship he went to the Mediterranean and was invested with the rating of midshipman on 1 January 1804. After assisting in the defence of Gaeta and the capture of Capri in 1806, he moved to HMS Blonde under Captain Volant Vashon Ballard, whom he accompanied to the West Indies Station, where he witnessed the reduction of the Danish West Indies and contributed to the capture of five privateers carrying 58 guns and 515 men. On 1 August 1809, as a reward for his conduct as prize-master of L'Alert, containing 20 guns and 149 men, Herbert was made a lieutenant by Sir Alexander Cochrane in his flagship HMS Neptune, on the recommendation of Ballard. He was officially promoted on 10 October.

== War of 1812 ==
From March 1810 to June 1814, Herbert served as a lieutenant on board HMS Pompee under Captain James Athol Wood in the West Indies, Home, and Mediterranean stations. In 1814, he became first lieutenant under Captain Charles John Napier of the frigate HMS Euryalus, in which he served in the War of 1812 against the United States. He was mentioned in the dispatches of Sir James Gordon for his ability and exertions displayed throughout the operations on the Potomac River, including the capture of Fort Washington and Raid on Alexandria. After serving in over twenty engagements and being wounded three times, he was promoted to commander on 19 October 1814. He did not take up his commission until February 1815, and he remained on half-pay until 6 September 1821.

== West Indies and South America ==
In September 1821, Herbert commissioned HMS Icarus for the Jamaica station, where he transferred to HMS Carnation, and was posted to HMS Tamar on 25 November. In that ship, he destroyed three pirate vessels on the coasts of Cuba and Yucatán. He served in Tamar until he brought her back home, and she was paid off in August 1823. In 1829, he was High Sheriff for County Kerry. He had no further military service until 10 November 1837, when he was appointed to HMS Calliope and sent to Brazil. Until the arrival of Commodore Thomas Ball Sulivan, Herbert conducted the duties of Senior Officer. Herbert was directed to assume command of the naval force in the Río de la Plata to protect British interests at Buenos Aires during a blockade by a French squadron, and at Monte Video. While carrying out his duties, he was twice officially assured of the approbation of the Admiralty. In January 1840, he went around Cape Horn, and joined Rear-Admiral Charles Ross at Valparaíso, where he began his expedition to China.

== China ==
In June 1840, Herbert sailed from Valparaíso to China in the Calliope via St. Bernardin's Passage. While en route in the Philippine Islands, the crew encountered a typhoon, which the ship survived through their efforts. After arriving in the Canton River on 10 October, he assumed command of the blockading force until the arrival of Rear-Admiral George Elliot on 20 November. In the Second Battle of Chuenpi on 7 January 1841, Herbert, who was in the Calliope, also had HMS Hyacinth and HMS Larne under his command. The ships fired on the island's lower fort of sixteen guns facing the sea, and silenced the Chinese batteries in less than an hour. Between 23 and 26 February, he participated in the Battle of the Bogue to prevent the Chinese making further defensive preparations in the Bocca Tigris. On 23 February, he sailed to the back passage of Anunghoy Island on board Nemesis, with the Calliope, HMS Samarang, HMS Herald, and HMS Alligator under his command. After unexpectedly reaching a masked battery of twenty guns that opened fire, the British ships rapidly returned fire and landed the troops, who soon captured the fort. Herbert reported eighty guns captured (twenty mounted and sixty unmounted), and twenty to thirty Chinese dead.

In the Battle of First Bar on 27 February, Herbert, while in Calliope, also had Herald, Alligator, HMS Sulphur, HMS Modeste, and the steamers Madagascar and Nemesis under his command. The ships cannonaded the Chinese war junks and batteries, which protected their strongly entrenched camp. In an hour, when the Chinese artillery was nearly silenced, he landed with the seamen and marines, and stormed the works, driving before them over 2,000 Chinese troops and killing nearly 300. The forts were under British possession half an hour later. He participated in further campaigns in capturing the forts leading towards Canton. From June to July 1841, he was senior officer in the Canton River, and on the arrival of Sir William Parker, Herbert was moved to HMS Blenheim, in which he took part in the capture of Amoy and Chusan, and commanded the naval brigade at the capture of Chinhai. He was appointed a Companion of the Most Honourable Military Order of the Bath on 29 June, and a Knight Commander of the Most Honourable Military Order of the Bath on 14 October.

== Later career ==
Herbert returned to England by the Cape of Good Hope, thus completing a circumnavigation of the globe, and paid off Blenheim in March 1843. On 11 January 1847, he was employed as commodore on the South East Coast of America Station until 1849, with a broad pennant on HMS Raleigh. From February to December 1852, he was Third Naval Lord under Algernon Percy, 4th Duke of Northumberland. He became a rear-admiral on 26 October 1852. He was promoted to vice-admiral on 8 December 1857. He received a good service pension in 1849. From July 1852 to April 1857, Herbert was Member of Parliament for Dartmouth. A Conservative, he opposed "further concessions to the Roman Catholics", and was against re-imposing an import duty on corn. He unsuccessfully contested that borough in 1859. After a protracted illness, he died on 4 August 1861 in Cadogan Place, Chelsea, London.

Military offices
Preceded by Samuel Inglefield	Commander-in-Chief, South East Coast of America Station; 1847–1849	Succeeded by William Henderson
Preceded by Sir James Stirling	Third Naval Lord; 1852–1853	Succeeded by Sir Richard Dundas
Parliament of the United Kingdom
Preceded by George Moffatt	Member of Parliament for Dartmouth; 1852–1857	Succeeded by James Caird
