= HMS Cambrian (1893) =

Astraea-class cruiser

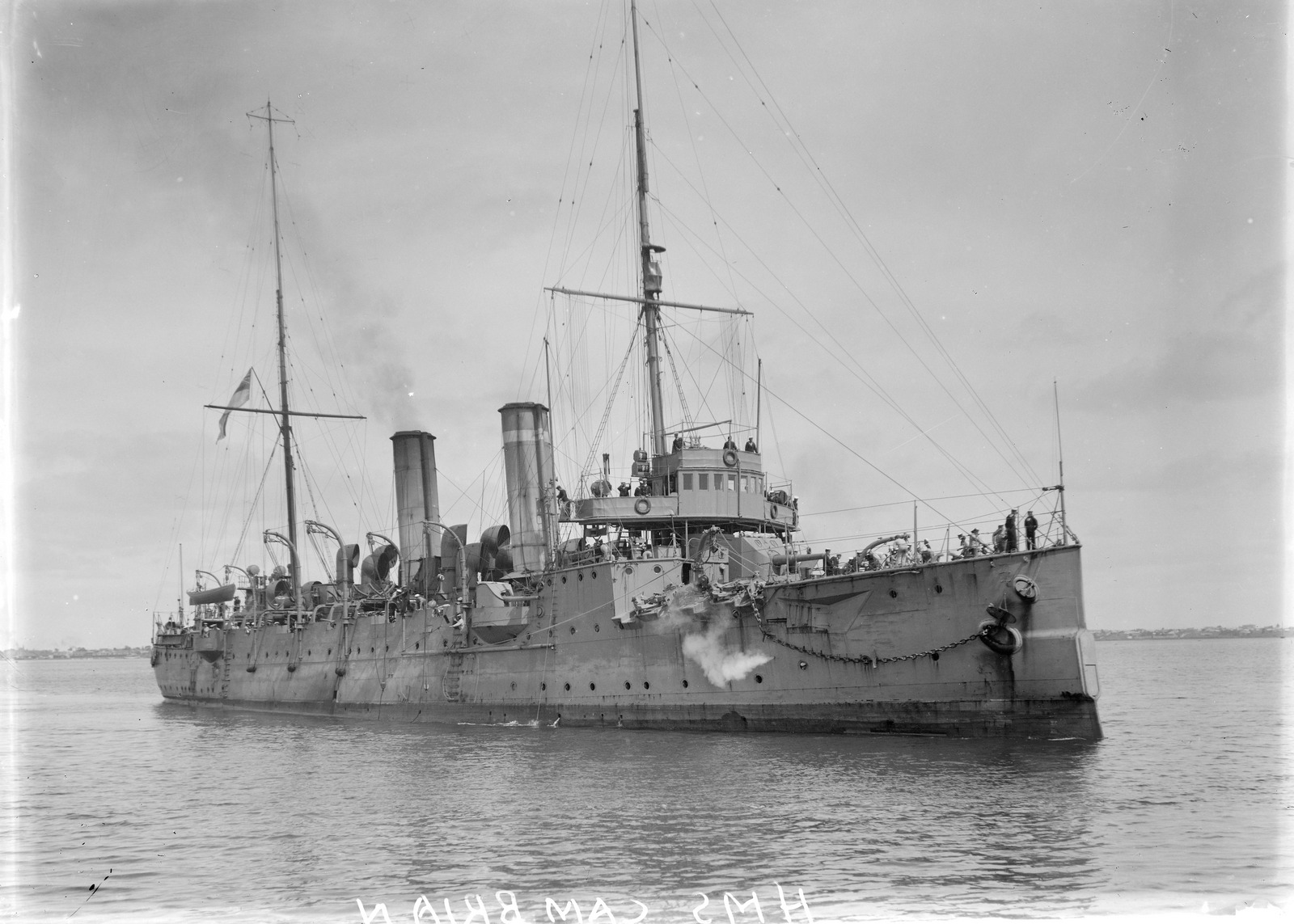
- HMS Cambrian

History

United Kingdom
- Name: HMS Cambrian
- Builder: Pembroke Dockyard
- Laid down: 1891
- Launched: 30 January 1893
- Fate: Sold in February 1923 and broken up.

General characteristics
- Class & type: Astraea-class cruiser
- Displacement: 4,360 tons
- Length: 320 ft (98 m) (p/p)
- Beam: 49.5 ft (15.1 m)
- Draught: 21 ft 6 in (6.55 m)
- Propulsion: Triple expansion engines Two shafts 7,500 ihp
- Speed: 18 knots (33 km/h; 21 mph) (natural draught); 19.5 knots (36.1 km/h; 22.4 mph) (forced draught)
- Range: Carried 1000 tons coal (max)
- Complement: 318
- Armament: 2 × QF 6-inch (152.4 mm) guns; 8 × QF 4.7 in (120 mm) guns; 1 × 76 mm (3.0 in) gun; 2 × 6-pounder guns; 1 × 3-pounder gun; 4 × machine guns; 3 × 18 inch (450 mm) torpedo tubes
- Armour: Conning tower: 3–6 in (76–152 mm); Deck: 2 in (51 mm); Engine hatch: 5 in (130 mm)

HMS Cambrian was a second-class protected cruiser, of the Royal Navy, built at the Pembroke Dockyard and launched on 30 January 1893. She was the last flagship of the Australia Station.

Prince Louis of Battenberg, later First Sea Lord, captained Cambrian in the Mediterranean Fleet from October 1894 to May 1897. In March 1901 she was commissioned at HMNB Devonport by Captain Frederick Sidney Pelham, with a crew of 345, to become senior officer's ship on the South East Coast of America Station. From May 1901 she was commanded by Commodore Robert Leonard Groome, when Captain Pelham had transferred to a different vessel. Captain Frank Finnis was appointed Commodore, 2nd class in command of the South East American Station based on the Cambrian in June 1902, and arrived to take up the command the following month. By the middle of August, Commander Edward Stafford Fitzherbert was in command of the ship, when she visited Montevideo and Santos, Brazil. She continued to Bahia and Rio de Janeiro the following months, and visited the Falkland Islands in early 1903.

In 1907 she was on the Mediterranean Station. She commenced service on the Australia Station on 3 October 1905 under the command of Captain Ernest Gaunt arriving in Sydney in December. In December 1905 Cambrian took possession of the Ashmore and Cartier Islands in the Indian Ocean on behalf of the United Kingdom. She left the Australia Station after the arrival of the Australian Navy Fleet and returned to England on 13 October 1913. Upon arrival in England she was paid off. She was converted into a base ship and renamed HMS Harlech in March 1916 and later HMS Vivid in September 1921.

== Fate ==
She was sold in 1923 to Young in Southerland for breaking up.
