= Charles James Norcock =

Vice-Admiral Charles James Norcock
- Born: 30 September 1847; Plymouth, Devon
- Died: April 1933 (aged 85); Havant, Hampshire
- Military career
- Allegiance: United Kingdom
- Branch: Royal Navy
- Rank: Vice-Admiral
- Commands: South East Coast of America Station
- Conflicts: Anglo-Egyptian War

Vice-Admiral Charles James Norcock (30 September 1847 – April 1933) was a Royal Navy officer who became Commander-in-Chief of the South East Coast of America Station.

== Naval career ==
Educated at the Royal Naval School at New Cross, Norcock joined the Royal Navy in June 1861 and saw action at the Bombardment of Alexandria in July 1882 during the Anglo-Egyptian War. He became commanding officer of the cruiser HMS Iris in July 1892, of the corvette HMS Caroline in November 1892 and of the protected cruiser HMS Phaeton in July 1896. He went on to be commanding officer of the protected cruiser HMS Retribution in September 1896 and of the cruiser HMS Flora in February 1898. After that he became Commodore on the South East Coast of America Station in late 1898 and Assistant Superintendent of Naval Reserves in August 1899. He retired on 30 September 1902, and was promoted to rear-admiral on the Retired list on 3 October 1902. He was later promoted to vice-admiral on the retired list.

Military offices
Preceded by None (Previously a Captain's command)	Commodore, South East American Station; 1898–1899	Succeeded by Robert Groome
