= Admiral Hope =

Admiral Hope may refer to:

- George Hope (Royal Navy officer) (1869–1959), British Royal Navy admiral
- George Johnstone Hope (1767–1818), British Royal Navy rear admiral
- Henry Hope (Royal Navy officer) (1787–1863), British Royal Navy admiral
- James Hope (Royal Navy officer) (1808–1881), British Royal Navy admiral
- William Johnstone Hope (1766–1831), British Royal Navy vice admiral

== See also ==
- William Hope-Johnstone (1798–1878), British Royal Navy admiral
