= HMY Mekong =

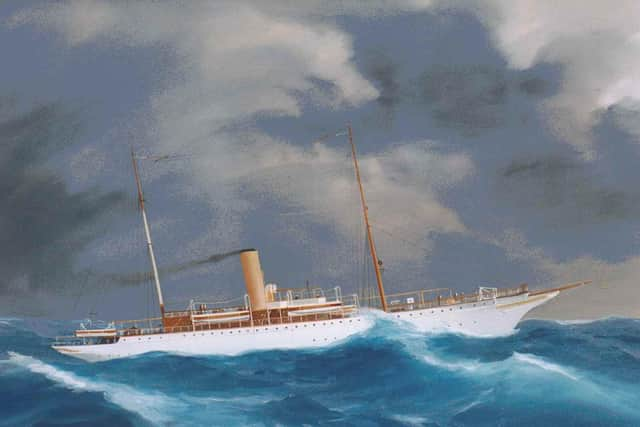
- The yacht Mekong

History
- Name: 1906: Maund
- Owner: 1906: Adam Mortimer Singer
- Operator: 1914: (United Kingdom) Royal Navy
- Builder: Ramage & Ferguson, Leith
- Fate: wrecked, 12 March 1916

General characteristics
- Type: steam yacht
- Tonnage: 1906: 903 GRT
- Length: 213.5 ft (65.1 m)
- Beam: 30.4 ft (9.3 m)
- Installed power: 204 NHP
- Propulsion: triple-expansion steam engine
- Armament: 1914: 3 small cannons

The luxury yacht HMY Mekong was originally built in 1906 as the Maund, a luxury steam-yacht. At 903 tons, the ship was 213 feet (65 m) long with a beam of 30 feet (9.1 m). A 204-horsepower (152 kW) steam engine gave her a top speed of 16 knots (30 km/h; 18 mph). The luxurious vessel was built for Adam Mortimer Singer of the sewing machine company. It was then sold to a French noble, the Prince Ferdinand, Duke of Montpensier, who renamed it Mekong after the Mekong River, in the French colony of French Indochina.

== World War 1 service ==
The Texas newspaper El Paso Herald on 16 October 1914 reported that when war broke out Montpensier gifted it to the British Royal Navy representatives in Tokyo. They accepted his offer on 5 August 1914 but "begged" him to sail it to the British colony port of Weihaiwei in China. In the tradition of British privateers, they armed his ship with "three little guns made more for ornament than use, and but one man on board who knew how to fire them." On their maiden raiding voyage, while the ship was still commanded by the Duc de Montpensier's American Captain Henry E. Morton, they came across a German merchant ship SS Hamametal (4,000 GRT). The German ship tried to run but quickly surrendered when fired upon. Hamametal was taken as a prize ship and it and the Mekong sailed to Weihaiwei.

HMY Mekong was operating off the coast of Great Britain when a storm hit on 12 March 1916. Under the command of Admiral Frank Finnis who had come out of retirement at the age of 65, the ship struck rocks off Gristhorpe, Yorkshire and was driven ashore under the cliffs, becoming a total wreck. Of around the 50 crew who were aboard the ship, three were lost to the sea as the crew were rescued.
