= Samuel Inglefield =

British Royal Navy admiral (1783–1848)

Rear-Admiral Samuel Inglefield CB
- Born: 1783
- Died: 24 February 1848 (aged 64–65); Bombay
- Father: John Nicholson Inglefield
- Relatives: Edward Augustus Inglefield (son)
- Military career
- Allegiance: Great Britain; United Kingdom
- Branch: Royal Navy
- Service years: 1791–1848
- Rank: Rear-Admiral
- Commands: HMS Ganges; Brazils and River Plate Station; East Indies and China Station
- Conflicts: French Revolutionary Wars; Napoleonic Wars; Uruguayan Civil War; Battle of Vuelta de Obligado
- Awards: Companion of the Order of the Bath

Rear-Admiral Samuel Hood Inglefield CB (1783 – 24 February 1848) was a Royal Navy officer who went on to be Commander in-Chief, East Indies and China Station.

== Naval career ==
The son of John Nicholson Inglefield, Inglefield joined the Royal Navy in 1791. He was promoted to post-captain in 1807 and commanded HMS Bacchante at Jamaica in 1807 and assisted in the capture of the Spanish privateer Amor de la Patria, and intercepted a Spanish armed vessel. The following year he captured the French brig Griffon.

By 1827 Inglefield was commanding HMS Ganges. Promoted to rear admiral in 1841, he was appointed Commander-in-Chief on the Brazils and River Plate Station at a time when Uruguayan Civil War was underway. Inglefield took decisive action at this time to keep the Paraná River open so ensuring continuity of trade. He became Commander in-Chief, East Indies and China Station in 1846 and died of apparent heat stroke while still serving in that role in 1848.

He lived at Orpington in Kent.

== Family ==
In 1816 he married Priscilla Margaret Otway. He was father to Edward Augustus Inglefield, an admiral, inventor and Arctic explorer.

== See also ==
- O'Byrne, William Richard (1849). "Inglefield, Samuel Hood" . A Naval Biographical Dictionary . John Murray – via Wikisource.

Military offices
| Preceded by John Purvis | Commander-in-Chief, South East Coast of America Station; 1844–1846 | Succeeded by Sir Thomas Herbert |
| Preceded by Sir Thomas Cochrane | Commander-in-Chief, East Indies and China Station; 1846–1848 | Succeeded by Sir Francis Collier |
