= HMS Madagascar (1822) =

Frigate of the Royal Navy

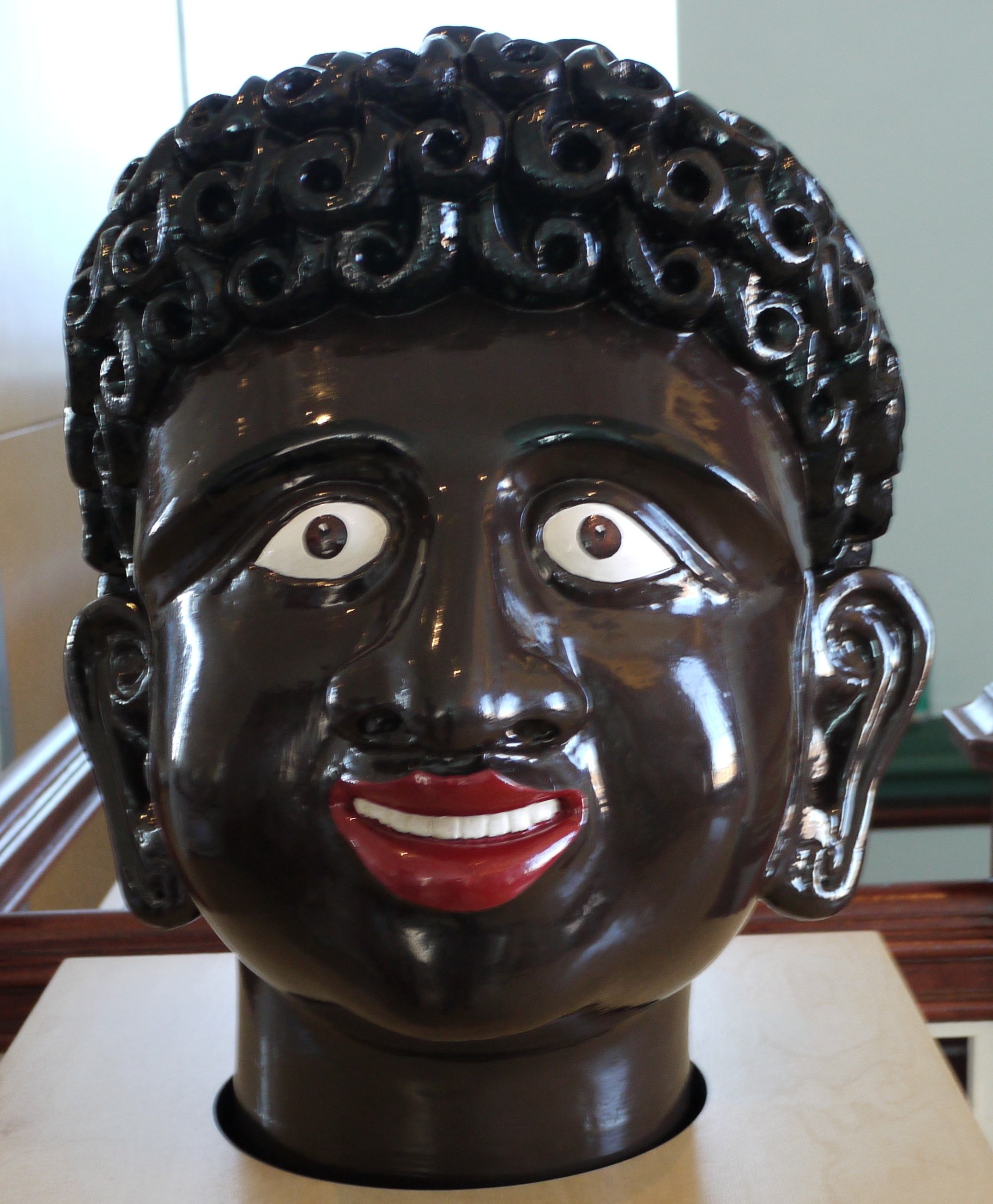
- The figurehead of HMS Madagascar

History

United Kingdom
- Name: HMS Madagascar
- Ordered: 5 April 1817
- Builder: East India Company, Bombay
- Laid down: October 1821
- Launched: 15 November 1822
- Completed: January 1829 at Portsmouth Dockyard
- Motto: –
- Fate: Sold 5 May 1863

General characteristics
- Class & type: Seringapatam-class frigate
- Tons burthen: 1,162 bm
- Length: 159 ft (48 m) (gundeck)
- Beam: 40 ft 5 in (12.32 m)
- Depth of hold: 12 ft 9 in (3.89 m)
- Propulsion: Sail
- Speed: –
- Range: –
- Complement: 315
- Armament: 46 guns

HMS Madagascar was a 46-gun fifth-rate Druid-class sloop; originally intended as a Seringapatam-class frigate. The ship underwent slight modifications when it was reordered in 1820, and so was built and launched at Bombay (modern day Mumbai) as a Druid-class on 15 November 1822; a sub-class of the Seringapatam.

Madagascar was built under Master Shipwright Nowrojee Jamsetjee Wadia, who had succeeded his father, Jamsetjee Bomanjee, following his retirement in 1817. The ship was commissioned by the Royal Navy from the East India Company who had established the yard in 1735. It is believed that Parsi shipwrights were brought to Bombay (Mumbai) from the Surat province of Gujarat, to assist with shipbuilding though no record survives detailing exactly who was responsible for building HMS Madagascar (1822) or carving the figurehead.

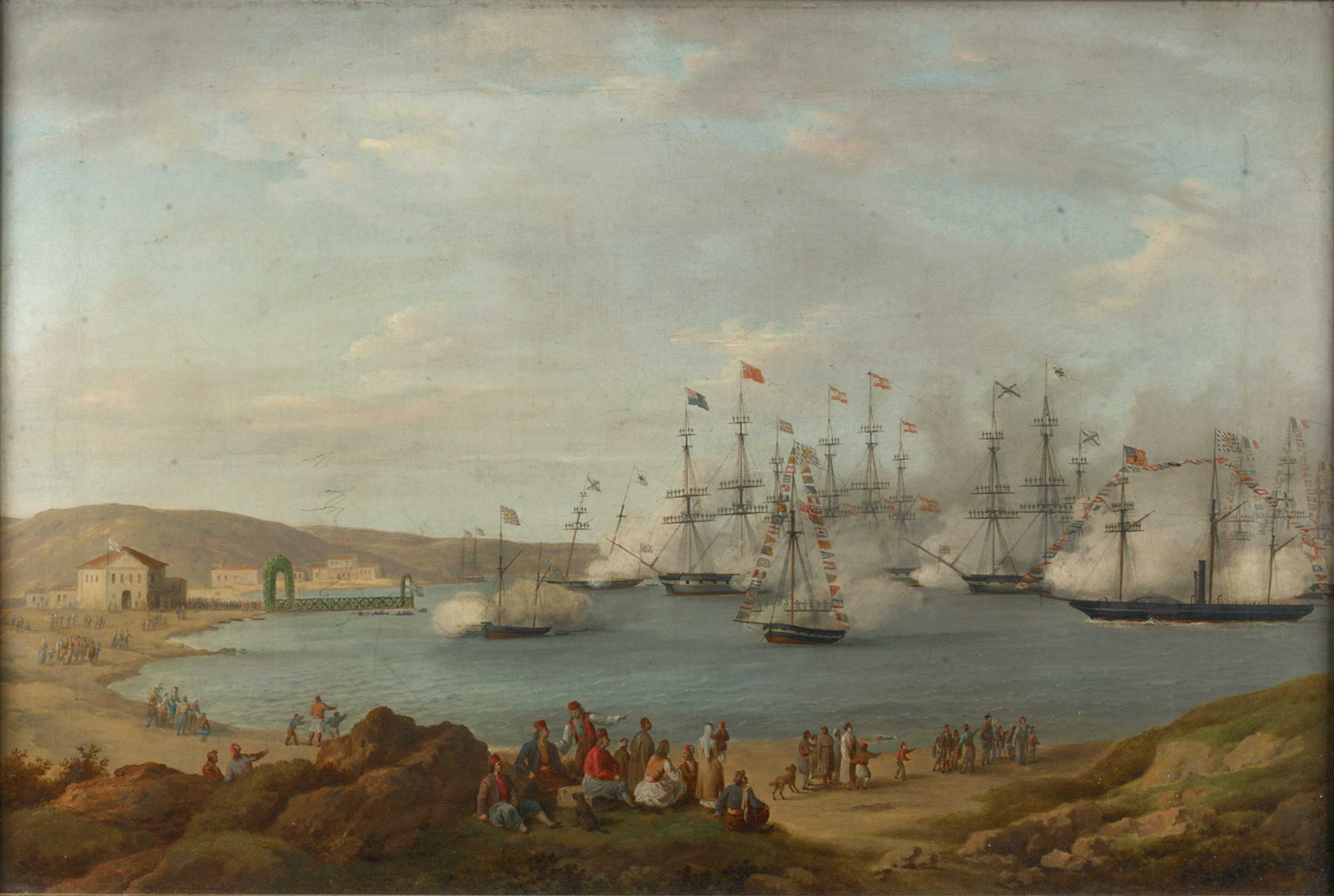
Madagascar (centre) and the international squadron carrying Prince Otto of Bavaria to become King of Greece firing a salute off Nafplio, February 1833

Madagascar delivered Bavarian Prince Otto, who had been selected as the King of Greece, to his new capital Nafplion in 1833. In 1843, Madagascar was assigned to the West Africa Squadron for the suppression of the Atlantic slave trade, which had been made illegal throughout the British Empire since 1807, when the Slave Trade Act prohibited its continuation. Operating off the West African coast, it successfully detained the Portuguese slave schooner Feliz in 1837, the Brazilian slave ships Ermelinda Segunda (detained 1842), Independencia (1843), Prudentia (1843) and Loteria (1843), and the Spanish slave brigantine Roberto (1842), along with two other vessels of which the nationalities were not recorded.

In 1848, Madagascar became a storeship, first in Devonport and then at Rio de Janeiro after 1853. She was sold in 1863.

== Figurehead ==
The figurehead has survived and is now in the National Museum of the Royal Navy.

== Commanding officers ==
- 1830 – Sir Robert Spencer, second son of the Earl of Spencer died aboard ship in Malta.
- 1830–1834 – captain Edmund Lyons
- 1838–1839 – Provo Wallis, KCB, East Indies
- 1840 – Out of Commission
- 1841–1844 – captain John Foote, west coast of Africa
- 1847 – Robert Mann
- 1853 – John William Finch, storeship, Rio de Janeiro, Brazil
- 1855 – John Ptolemy Thurburn, storeship, Rio de Janeiro, Brazil
- 1856 – John Mortimer Leycester, storeship, Rio de Janeiro, Brazil
- 1859–1863 – Vice Admiral Richard Dunning White, CB, storeship, Rio de Janeiro, Brazil
