= Wallis House =

Building in Ottawa, Canada

Coordinates: 45.433124°N 75.676070°W

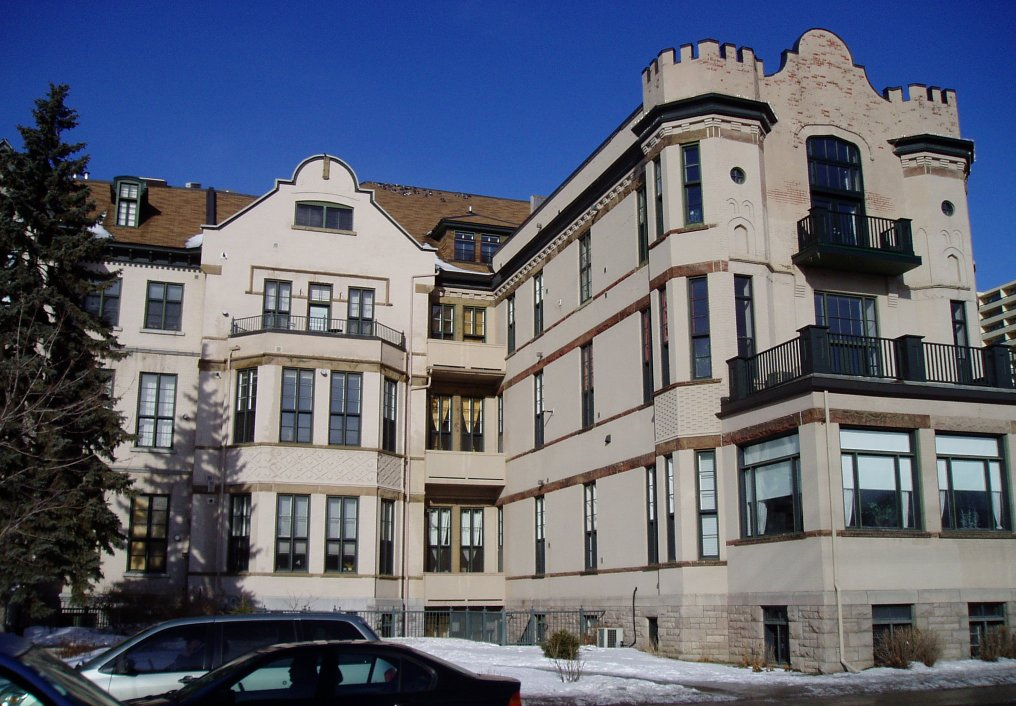
The eastern portion of Wallis House in 2004

Wallis House is a prominent landmark building in Ottawa, Ontario, Canada. It is located at the corner of Rideau Street and Charlotte Street. Today, after restoration, the building serves as a deluxe condominium complex.

== History ==
Originally built to house the Carleton County Protestant General Hospital (This is not the Ottawa General that went from Sussex and Water to Smyth Road, now known as the Élisabeth Bruyère Hospital on Bruyere Street), this was the second hospital in the city, after the Catholic hospital run by the Grey Nuns. The hospital's first building was completed in 1851, but had become too small and Wallis House was built to replace it between 1873 and 1876. It was paid for and supported by the various Protestant churches in the area. The east wing was added to the hospital between 1887 and 1898. It remained a hospital until 1924, when it was merged with two others to create the Ottawa Civic Hospital.

=== War usage ===
The building served as a Catholic seminary until 1943, when the military took it over and used it to house members of the Women's Royal Canadian Naval Service during the Second World War. The navy gave it the name Wallis House, after Provo Wallis, a hero of the War of 1812, who later rose to be an admiral in the Royal Navy.

=== Post-war ===
After the war, it was left empty, leading to protests from returning veterans who faced a housing crisis. In 1946, a group of veterans and squatters occupied the building until they were forced out by the Governor General's Foot Guards. The event drew enough attention that Prime Minister William Lyon Mackenzie King mandated that it be turned into subsidized housing.

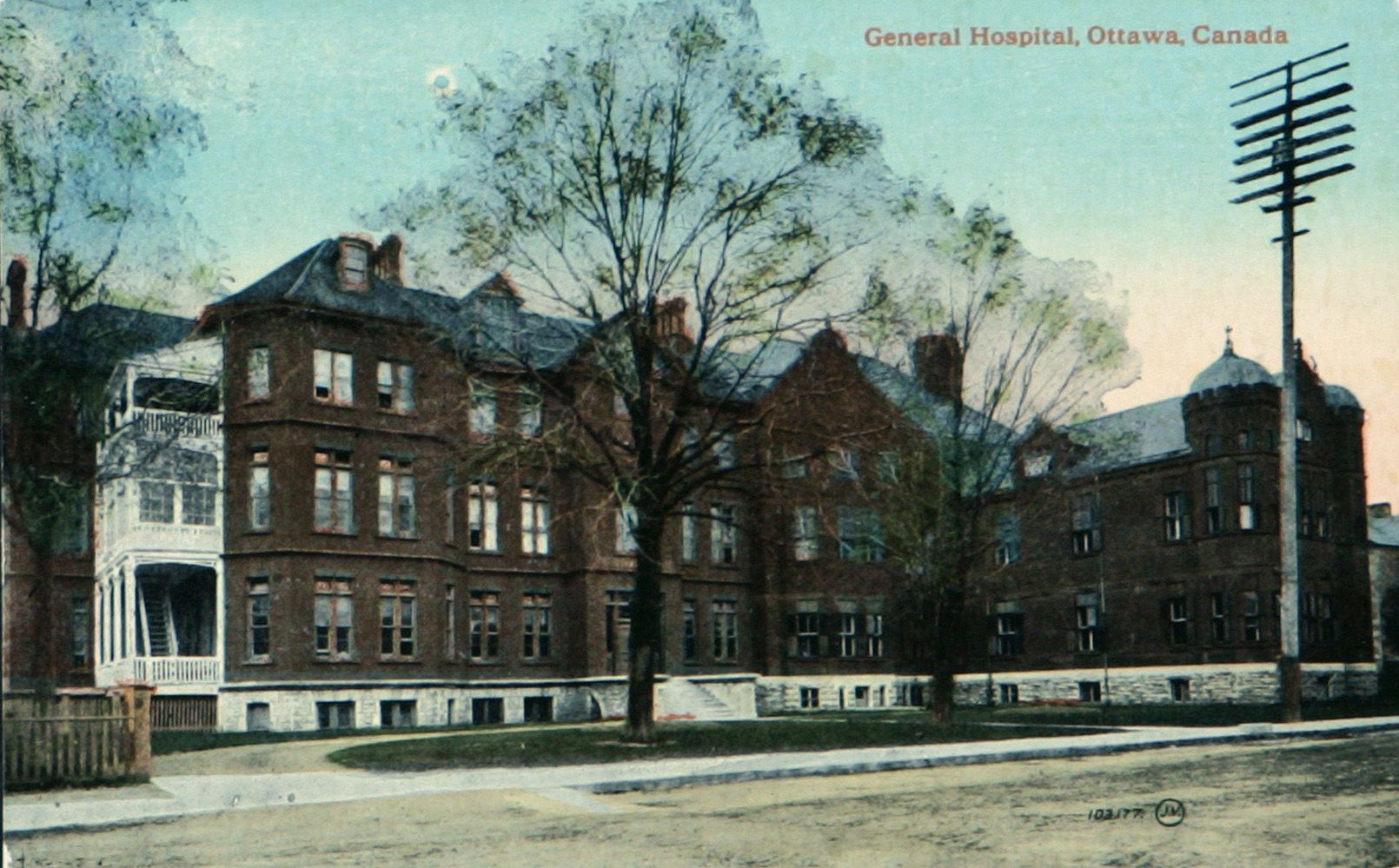
The General Hospital, circa 1920

In 1950, the military reoccupied the structure and it served a number of purposes over the next decades, eventually becoming the home of 28 Service battalion, 763 Communications Regiment (formerly 3 Signals Regiment RC Signals) and several minor Army reserve units. The aged building soon became a problem. Constant minor renovations left the interior a warren of hallways and rooms. The military inspectors also considered it to be a dangerous fire trap. There were problems with asbestos and PCBs that would require an expensive clean-up effort. It was thus abandoned by the armed forces and boarded up.

It remained vacant for several years and was threatened with demolition. This led to a number of squabbles. The city wanted the federal government to do something about the dangerous structure in the centre of town, heritage and veterans' groups protested the demolition, and the Government could find no one interested in buying the site. A number of proposals were advanced, perhaps the most unlikely was when the commission on the prostitution problem in the city proposed turning the building into a city run and regulated brothel.

=== Current usage ===
The debate was finally resolved in May 1994 when L.A Sandy Smallwood, a heritage restorer, bought the structure for $320,000 and promised to restore it. Wallis House was turned into 47 high-end condominiums. The parking lot behind the building was converted into a group of town houses, while the land to the east was set aside for an apartment building. When the Wallis House condos went on sale in October 1995, they were all sold in fewer than twenty-four hours. This unprecedented event was the beginning of a long-lasting real estate boom in Ottawa.

The City of Ottawa erected brass plaques, which were unveiled in 1990 and 1997. The memorial is dedicated to Admiral of the Fleet Sir Provo William Perry Wallis, GCB (1791-1892), from Halifax, Nova Scotia.
