= HMS Flora (1893) =

Astraea-class cruiser

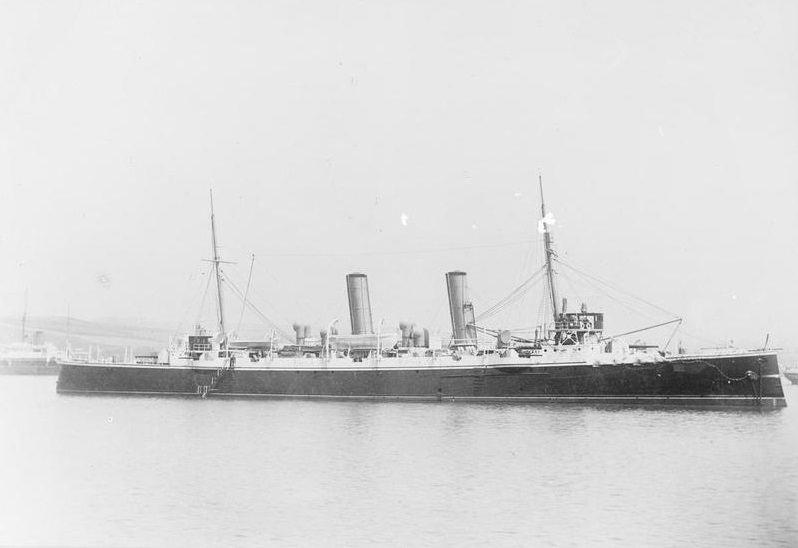
- HMS Flora

History

United Kingdom
- Name: HMS Flora
- Builder: Pembroke Dock
- Launched: 21 November 1893
- Commissioned: 24 July 1895
- Decommissioned: March 1922
- Renamed: TS Indus II in April 1915
- Fate: Sold 12 December 1922 for breaking up in Dover

General characteristics
- Class & type: Astraea-class cruiser
- Displacement: 4,360 long tons (4,430 t) fully loaded
- Length: 320 ft (98 m)
- Beam: 49 ft 6 in (15.09 m)
- Draught: 19 ft (5.8 m)
- Propulsion: 2 shaft, 3 cycle TE, 8 cylinder boilers; 7,500 hp (5,600 kW) natural draught; 9,500 hp (7,100 kW) forced draught; Coal 1000 tons maximum load
- Speed: 18 knots (33 km/h) natural draught; 19.5 knots (36.1 km/h) forced draught
- Range: 7,000 nmi (13,000 km)
- Complement: 44
- Armament: 2 × QF 6 in (152 mm) guns; 8 × QF 4.7 in (120 mm) guns; 1 × 3 pdr (47 mm) quick firing gun; 4 × 18 in (450 mm) torpedo tubes
- Armour: Deck 2 in (51 mm); Conning tower 3 in (76 mm); Gunshields 4.5 in (114 mm); engine hatch 5 in (127 mm)

HMS Flora was an Astraea-class cruiser of the Royal Navy launched on 21 November 1893. She was constructed under the Naval Defence Act 1889 along with several other Astraea-class cruisers. Flora was decommissioned in 1922.

== Operational history ==
HMS Flora served a commission, under the command of Commodore Robert Leonard Groome and later of Captain Frederick Sidney Pelham, as senior officer′s ship on the South East Coast of America Station until June 1901, when she returned to Devonport to pay off.

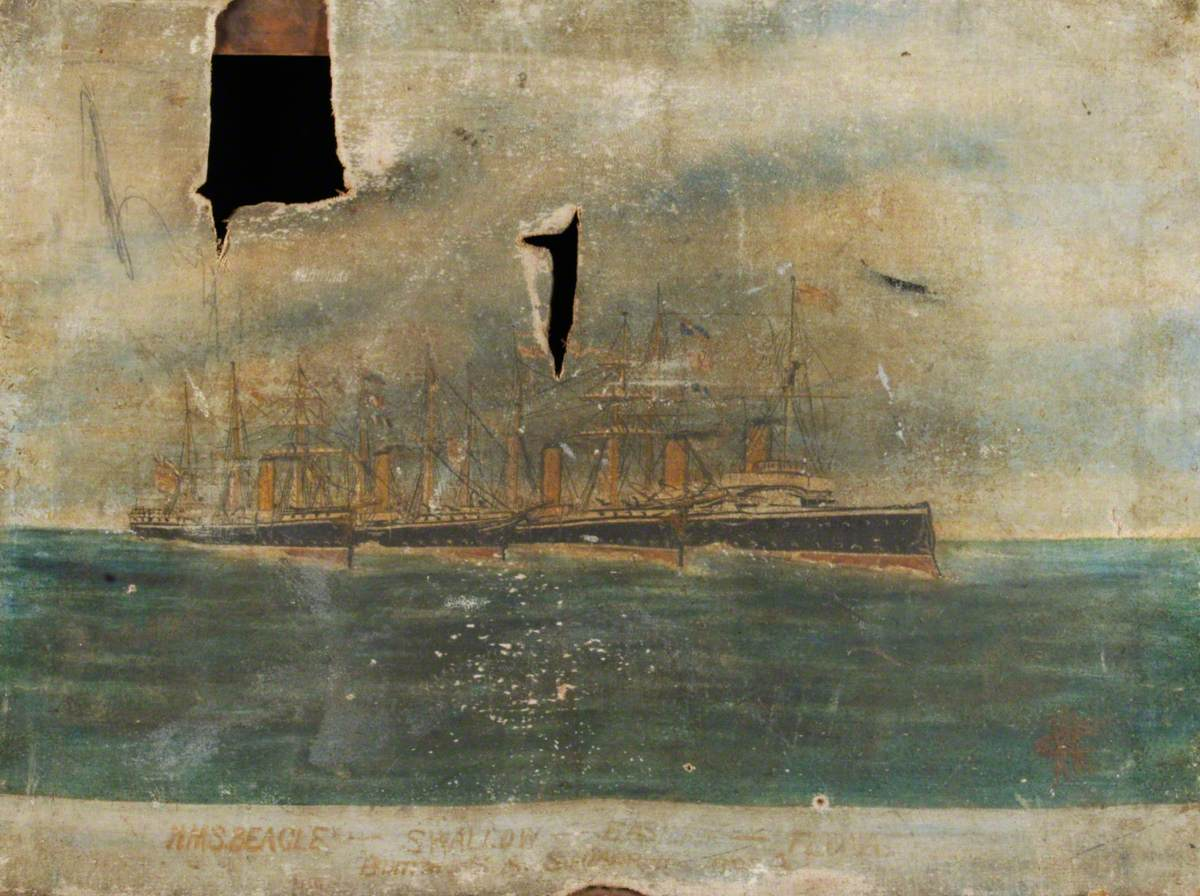
HMS Beagle, Swallow, Basilisk and Flora, unknown artist

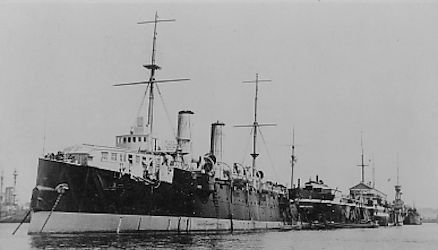
HMS "Indus II" at Devonport in October 1915

She was commissioned at Devonport on 11 November 1902 to relieve HMS Phaeton for service on the Pacific Station. Leaving Plymouth in late November, she stopped in Funchal, Saint Vincent, Pernambuco and Montevideo before she arrived at the station early the following year.

HMS Flora was the subject of a famous salvage operation after running aground in 1903.

In 1914, just prior to the First World War, Flora was placed on the sale list and remained on harbour service for the majority of the conflict. In April 1915 Flora was renamed TS Indus II. She was sold on 12 December 1922 and was broken up at Dover.

== Publications ==
- Colledge, J. J.; Warlow, Ben (2006) [1969]. Ships of the Royal Navy: The Complete Record of All Fighting Ships of the Royal Navy from the 15th Century to the Present (3rd Rev ed.). London: Chatham Publishing. ISBN 978-1-86176-281-8. OCLC 67375475.
