= HMS Forte (1893) =

Astraea-class cruiser

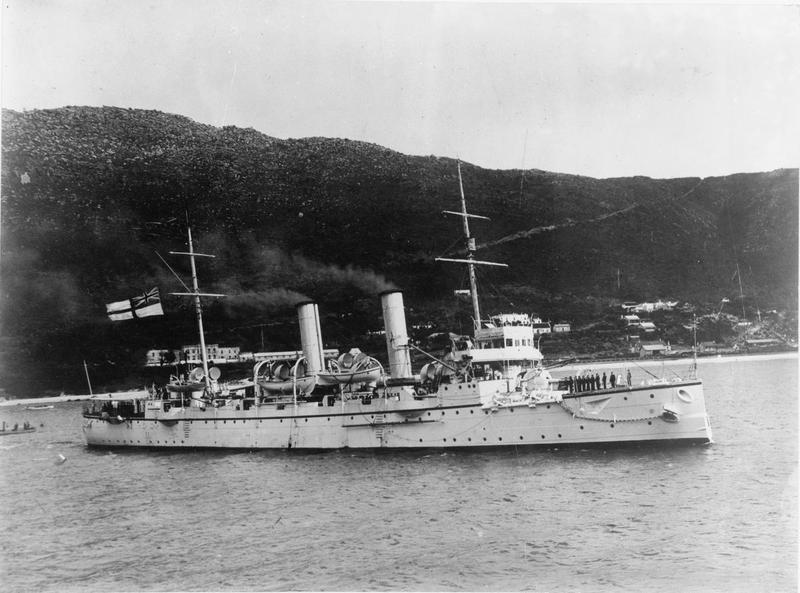
- HMS Forte leaving Simonstown, South Africa, c. 1900

History

United Kingdom
- Name: HMS Forte
- Builder: Chatham Dockyard
- Launched: 9 December 1893
- Commissioned: 5 November 1895
- Decommissioned: 1913
- Fate: Sold 2 April 1914 for breaking up

General characteristics
- Class & type: Astraea-class cruiser
- Displacement: 4,360 tons loaded
- Length: 320 ft (97.5 m) (pp); 339 ft 6 in (103.48 m) (oa)
- Beam: 49 ft 6 in (15.09 m)
- Draught: 19 ft (5.8 m)
- Propulsion: 2 shaft, 3 cycle TE, 8 cylinder boilers; 7,500 hp (5,600 kW) natural draught; 9,500 hp (7,100 kW) forced draught; Coal 1,000 tons maximum load
- Speed: 18 knots (33 km/h; 21 mph) natural draught; 19.5 knots (36.1 km/h; 22.4 mph) forced draught
- Range: 7,000 nmi (13,000 km; 8,100 mi)
- Complement: 44
- Armament: 2 × QF 6 in (150 mm) guns; 8 × QF 4.7 in (120 mm) guns; 1 × 3-pounder (47 mm) quick firing gun; 4 × 18-inch (450 mm) torpedo tubes
- Armour: Deck 2 in (51 mm); Conning tower 3 in (76 mm); Gunshields 4.5 in (110 mm); Engine hatch 5 in (130 mm)

HMS Forte was an Astraea-class cruiser of the Royal Navy launched on 9 December 1893. She was constructed under the Naval Defence Act 1889 along with several other Astraea-class cruisers. Forte was eventually decommissioned in 1913.

== History ==
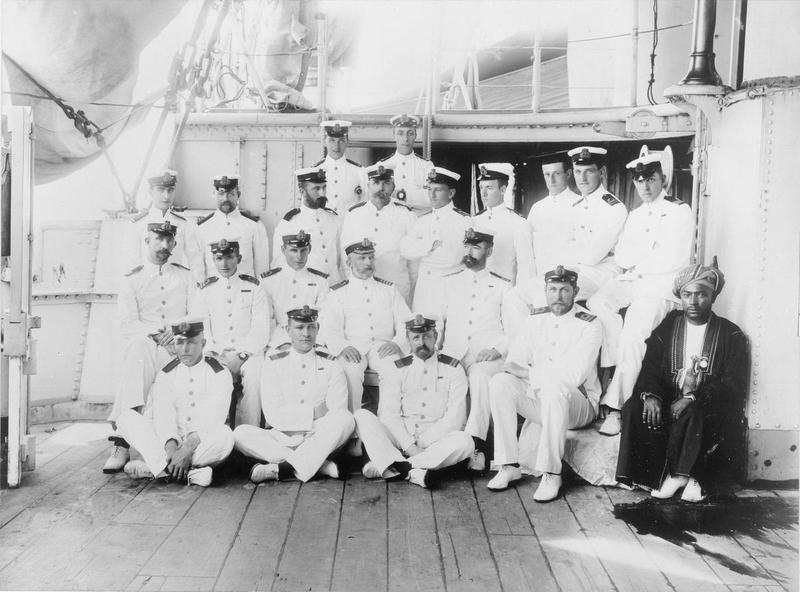
Officers of HMS Forte, Zanzibar, 1901–1902)

HMS Forte served on the Cape and West African stations. She visited Sierra Leone and The Gambia in early January 1901. In December 1902 she was reported to be in East Africa, when she took the British colonial secretary Joseph Chamberlain and his wife from Mombasa to Zanzibar during their tour of British colonies.

In 1908, the ship delivered such a terrible result in a gunlayer's test that a Court of Inquiry was convened, leading to the determination that Captain John Green and his officers had failed to provide sufficient training, as they had not appreciated the difficulty of the test procedure. In 1910 Green ran the cruiser aground, eliciting Their Lordships "severe displeasure for failure to comply with King's Regulations for unseamanlike manner in which the ship was navigated."

== Disposal ==
In 1913 Forte was placed on the sale list and sold on 2 April 1914 for scrapping. She was the only ship of her class not to see service in the First World War.
