= Frank Finnis =

Royal Navy Admiral (1851–1918)

Admiral Frank Finnis CVO
- Born: 8 November 1851
- Died: 17 November 1918 (aged 67)
- Military career
- Allegiance: United Kingdom
- Branch: Royal Navy
- Rank: Admiral
- Commands: HMS Amphion; HMS Cambrian; South East American Station; Chatham division
- Awards: Commander of the Royal Victorian Order

Admiral Frank Finnis CVO (8 November 1851 – 17 November 1918) was a British Royal Navy admiral before the First World War.

== Early life ==
Finnis was born in 1851, the son of Steriker Finnis, of Dover. He was educated at Highgate School from 1862 and entered the Royal Navy in 1864.

== Navy career ==
Finnis was promoted to lieutenant in 1874, commander in 1886, and to captain on 1 January 1893. He was appointed in command of the second class cruiser HMS Amphion on 7 January 1897, and served on the Pacific Station until the ship paid off at Devonport on 13 February 1900. In early February 1900 it was announced that Finnis would be appointed in command of the battleship Collingwood, but the appointment was cancelled, and he was appointed in command of the battleship Illustrious until early 1902. On 20 June 1902 he was appointed Commodore, 2nd class in command of the protected cruiser HMS Cambrian, and Commander of the South East American Station, where the Cambrian was senior officers's ship. Before departure from London, he was received in audience by King Edward VII on 11 June, on his appointment as commander of the station, and he arrived to take up the post the following month. With the Cambrian, he visited Montevideo and Santos, Brazil, in August 1902, then Bahia and Rio de Janeiro the following months. After spending New Year in Montevideo, she visited the Falkland Islands in early 1903.

He was promoted to rear-admiral in 1905, and was appointed commander of the Chatham division in the Home Fleet the following year. After his promotion to the rank of vice-admiral on 15 November 1908 he was placed on the Retired List at his own request on 9 February 1909. He was advanced to the rank of admiral on the Retired List on 20 March 1913. On 24 April 1915, during the First World War, he was granted a temporary commission as a captain in the Royal Naval Reserve. On 12 March 1916, while commanding HMY Mekong the ship was wrecked but he was safely evacuated from the wreck on the rocks.

Finnis died in London a week after the Armistice, on 17 November 1918, and was buried at St Alban's Churchyard, Frant, East Sussex.

== Family ==
Finnis married, in 1906, Anna MacRobin, daughter of Professor John MacRobin, Aberdeen, and widow of Herbert Lake.

Military offices
Preceded by Robert Leonard Groome	Commander, South East American Station; 1902–1904	Succeeded by
