= HMS Bonaventure (1892) =

Astraea-class cruiser

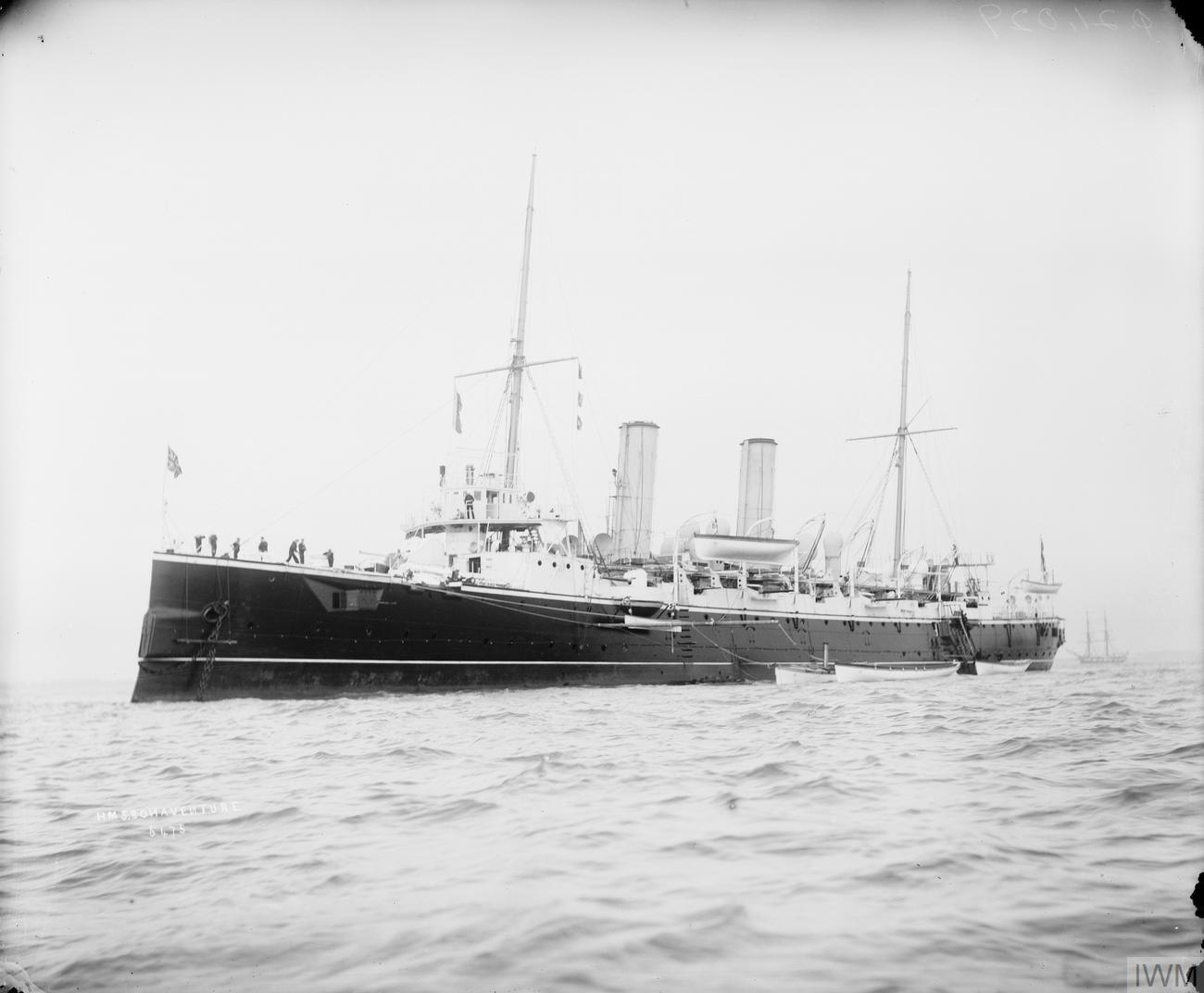
- HMS Bonaventure in the 1890s

History

United Kingdom
- Name: HMS Bonaventure
- Builder: Devonport Dockyard
- Laid down: December 1890
- Launched: 2 December 1892
- Commissioned: 5 July 1894
- Fate: Sold on 12 April 1920

General characteristics
- Class & type: Astraea-class cruiser
- Displacement: 4,360 tons
- Length: 320 ft (98 m) (p/p)
- Beam: 49.5 ft (15.1 m)
- Draught: 21 ft 6 in (6.55 m)
- Propulsion: Triple expansion engines; Two shafts; 7,500 ihp
- Speed: 18 knots (33 km/h; 21 mph) (natural draught); 19.5 knots (36.1 km/h; 22.4 mph) (forced draught)
- Range: Carried 1000 tons coal (max)
- Complement: 318
- Armament: 2 × QF 6-inch (152.4 mm) guns; 8 × QF 4.7 in (120 mm) guns; 1 × 76 mm (3.0 in) gun; 2 × 6-pounder guns; 1 × 3-pounder gun; 4 × machine guns; 3 × 18 inch (450 mm) torpedo tubes
- Armour: Conning tower: 3–6 in (76–152 mm); Deck: 2 in (51 mm); Engine hatch: 5 in (130 mm)

HMS Bonaventure was an Astraea-class second class cruiser of the Royal Navy, ordered as part of the eight-ship Astraea class under the Naval Defence Act of 1889. She was commissioned for service in 1895, and survived to serve in the First World War.

== History ==
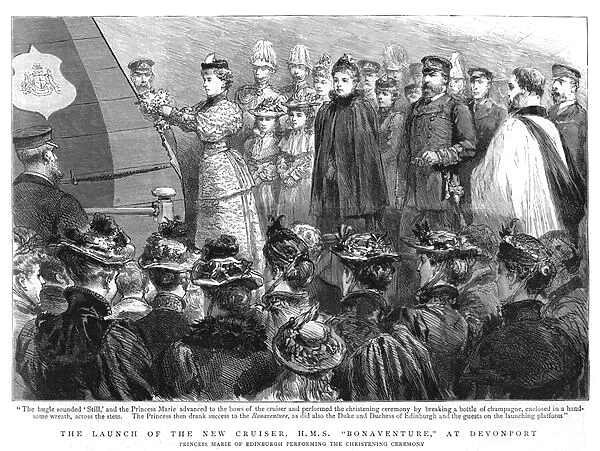
The launch of the new cruiser, Bonaventure, at Devonport, Princess Marie of Edinburgh performing the christening ceremony

Bonaventure served in the Pacific Squadron, including service in the 3rd China War, under command of Captain Robert Montgomerie RN.

She returned in May 1906 to Devonport to be paid off. She then went to Haulbowline Dockyard, Cork, Ireland to be converted into a depot ship for submarines.

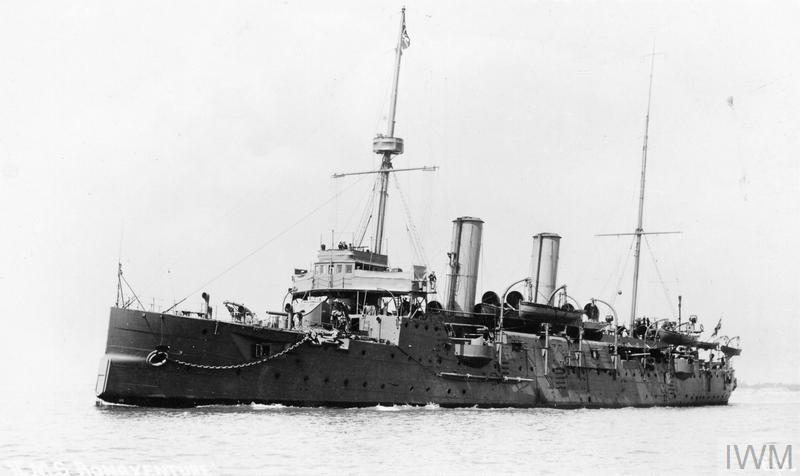
Bonaventure, converted to a submarine depot

This work was completed in April 1907 and she continued to serve during the First World War as a submarine depot ship.

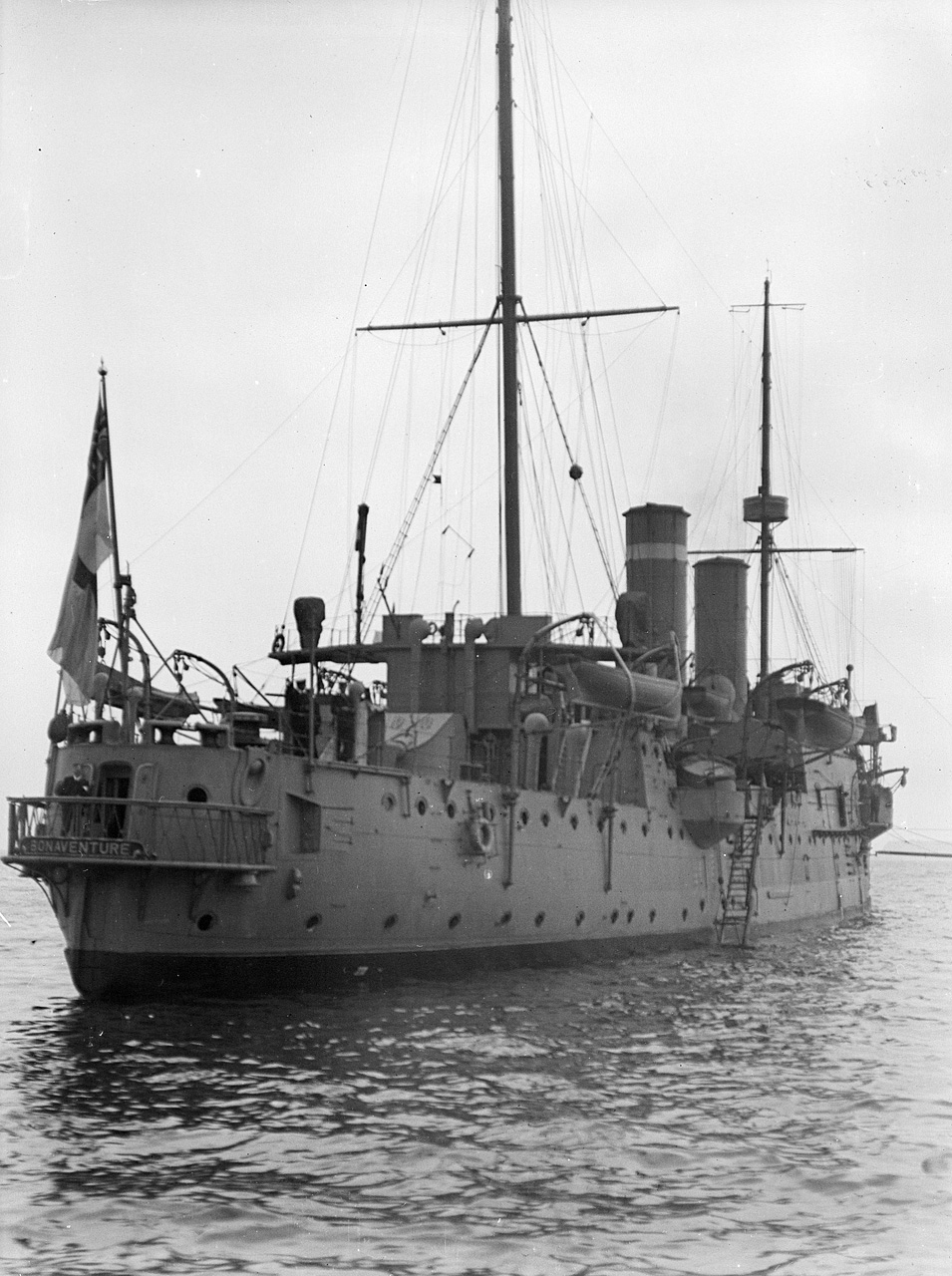
Stern view of HMS Bonaventure anchored at Spithead, 1909

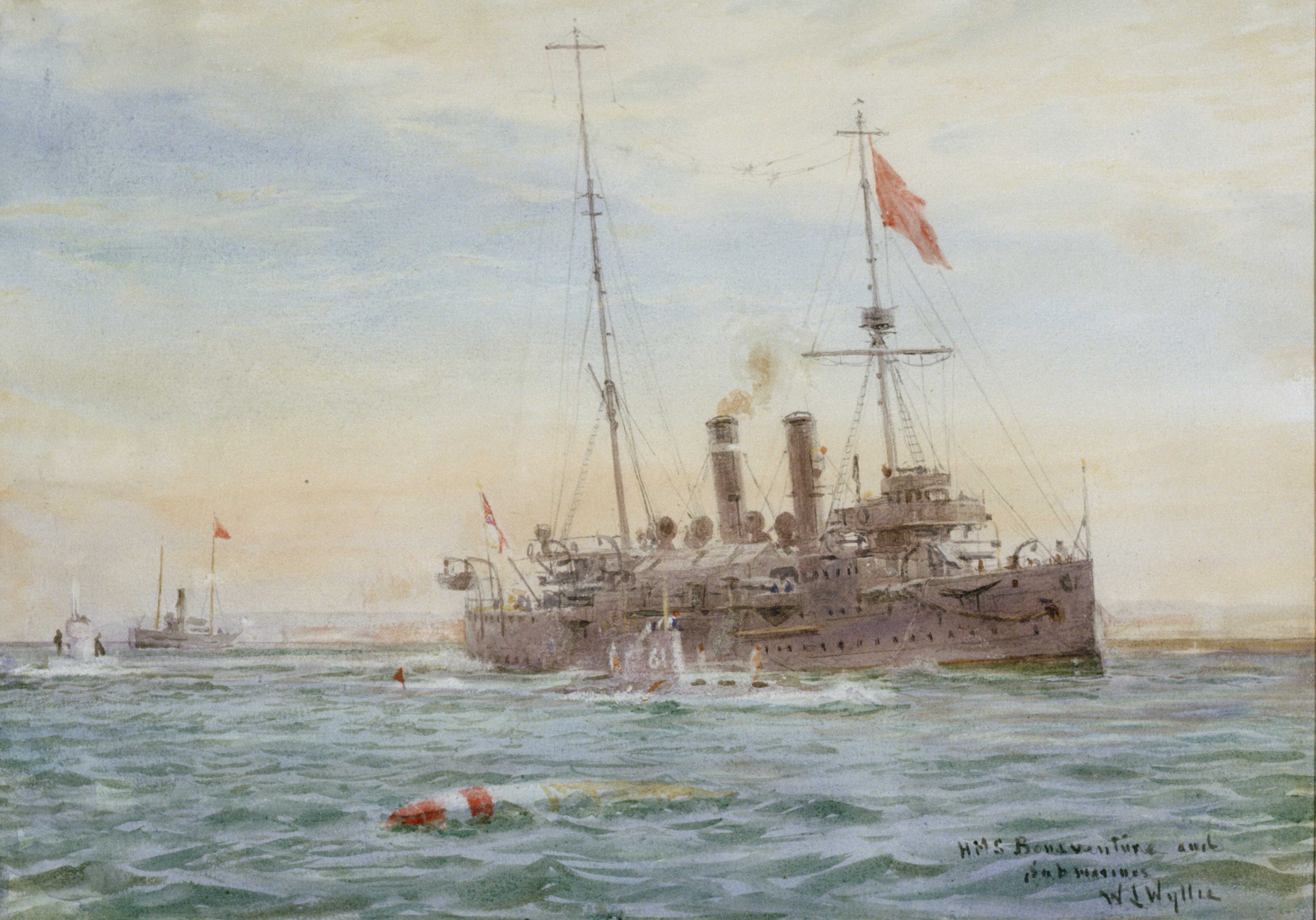
C31 alongside HMS Bonaventure

== Scrapping ==
Bonaventure returned to the UK and was paid off on 17 October 1919. She was sold on 12 April 1920 to the Forth Ship Breaking Company, Bo'ness.

== Publications ==
- Colledge, J. J.; Warlow, Ben (2006) [1969]. Ships of the Royal Navy: The Complete Record of All Fighting Ships of the Royal Navy from the 15th Century to the Present (3rd Rev ed.). London: Chatham Publishing. ISBN 978-1-86176-281-8. OCLC 67375475.
- Jane's Fighting Ships of World War One. Jane's Publishing Company. 1919.
