= HMS Fox (1893) =

Astraea-class cruiser

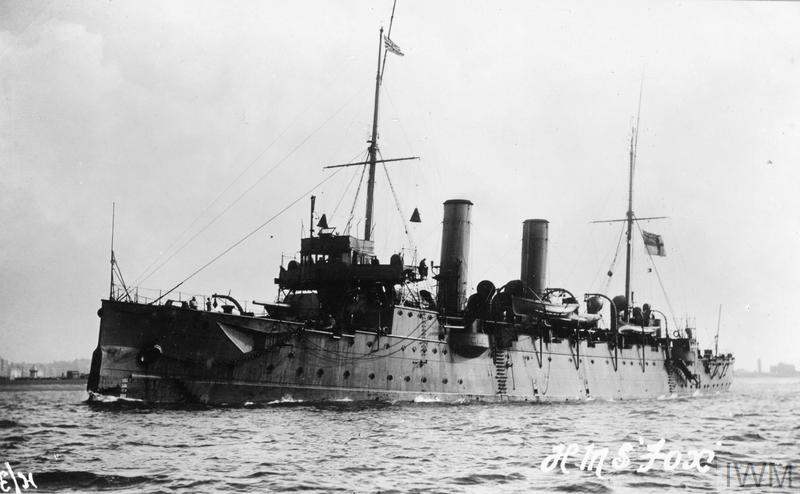
- HMS Fox

History

United Kingdom
- Name: HMS Fox
- Launched: 15 June 1893
- Commissioned: 1896
- Decommissioned: March 1919
- Fate: Sold for scrap 1920

General characteristics
- Class & type: Astraea-class protected cruiser
- Displacement: 4,360 tons loaded
- Length: 320 ft (98 m)
- Beam: 49 ft 6 in (15.09 m)
- Draught: 19 ft (5.8 m)
- Propulsion: 2 shaft, 3 cycle TE, 8 cylinder boilers; 7,500 hp (5,600 kW) natural draught; 9,500 hp (7,100 kW) forced draught; Coal 1,000 tons maximum load
- Speed: 18 knots (33 km/h; 21 mph) natural draught; 19.5 knots (36.1 km/h; 22.4 mph) forced draught
- Range: 7,000 nmi (13,000 km; 8,100 mi)
- Armament: 2 × QF 6 in (152 mm); 8 × QF 4.7 in (120 mm) guns; 10 × QF 6-pounder guns; 1 × QF 3-pounder gun; 4 × 18-inch (450 mm) torpedo tubes
- Armour: Deck: 2 in (51 mm); Conning tower 3 in (76 mm); Gunshields 4.5 in (110 mm); Engine hatch 5 in (130 mm)

HMS Fox was a second class protected cruiser of the Astraea class of the Royal Navy. The class represented an improvement on previous types, 1,000 tons displacement larger with better seaworthiness due to improved hull design. It also had somewhat increased firepower and superior arrangement of guns.

== Construction ==
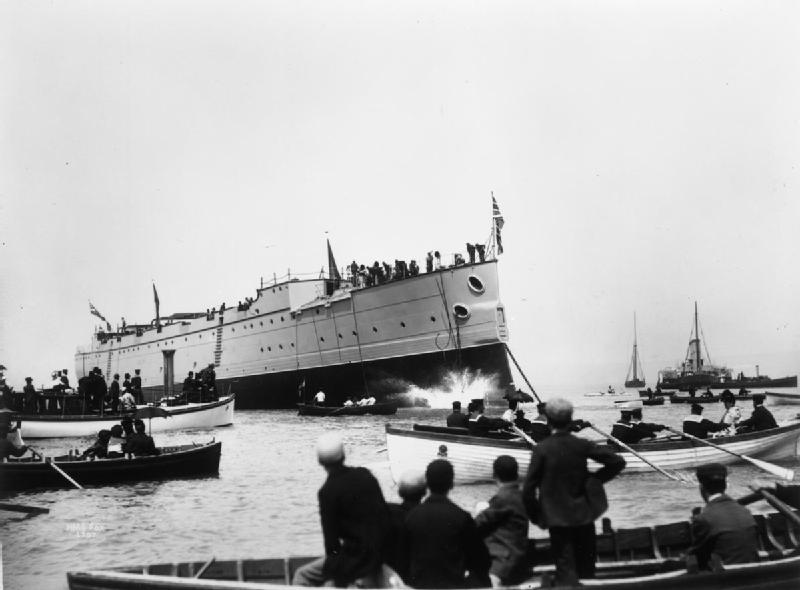
Fox on launching at the Portsmouth Royal Dockyard

Ships of this category were designed for overseas duty where they were unlikely to encounter first class opposition. They were useful for showing the flag, suppressing piracy, escorting convoys during wartime, supporting colonial governments, and as a show of force to minor powers. They had some use in countering armed merchant cruisers of a hostile navy.

Fox was sheathed in wood and copper, to fit her for tropical waters. The hull of an unsheathed steel vessel operating in warm waters would usually become so encrusted with barnacles that its speed would be seriously affected within six months.

== Operational service ==
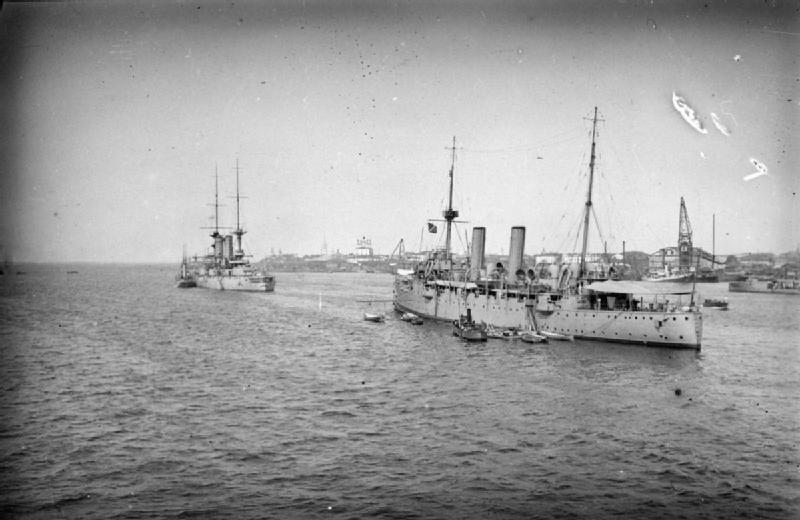
HMS Fox at Archangel in 1919

Fox was commissioned at Portsmouth on 10 September 1901 to relieve HMS Marathon on the East Indies Station, and left home waters the following month after a commissioning trial in the Channel. She arrived at Malta on 28 October, at Aden on 11 November, and later proceeded to Bombay. In early January 1902 she sailed to Kuwait, carrying six small guns presented by the British to Sheikh Mubarak, after recent trouble between Britain and Turkey in the Persian Gulf. In September 1902 she was reported to be in Colombo, where she had escorted the SS Nithsdale after it had been involved in an accident near the Maldives, and later that month she was back at station head quarters in Trincomalee. In late December 1902 she paid a visit to the Persian city of Bandar Abbas, which had been damaged by an earthquake earlier in the year. Early the following year, Fox escorted torpedo boats Not. 101 and 104 from Bombay to Aden, then went to Obbia on the Somali coast, where her captain served for a time as senior naval officer.

In April 1904 Fox took part in the Dervish War, including supplying men for the landing party that stormed and captured the forts at Illig, the ship's guns supporting the attack. She was paid off after six years in January 1907 and sent to the reserve fleet. In May 1908, she was recommissioned for the Home Fleet. In June 1908, she was sent once more to the East Indies where she served until 1914.

On the outbreak of the First World War Fox was 18 years old and obsolete, but continued in active service. Off Colombo, Ceylon, she captured two German merchant ships, the Australia on 10 August 1914, and the Holtenfels on 11 August 1914.

On 3 and 4 November Fox supported Indian and British troops in their unsuccessful attack on the port of Tanga in German East Africa on 3 and 4 November 1914. She then participated in the hunt for the German light cruiser SMS Königsberg and participated in a raid on Dar-es-Salaam where she bombarded the city. In January 1915 Fox was part of the force which occupied Mafia Island.

Fox served in the East Indies and Egypt from 1915 to 1917, and then in the Red Sea in 1917 to 1918. Fox played a critical role while in the Red Sea in supporting the Arab Revolt against the Ottoman Empire, flying the flag of William Boyle, 12th Earl of Cork.

In 1919, Fox was dispatched to participate as part of the British intervention in the Russian Civil War.

== Scrapping ==
The ship was sold in 1920 and scrapped in Watchet Harbour, Somerset by the Cardiff Scrap and Salvage company, in the autumn of 1923. She is still the largest vessel ever to enter Watchet Harbour.
