= Robert Leonard Groome =

Royal Navy Admiral; CiC of the South East Coast of America Station (1848–1917)

Admiral Robert Leonard Groome CVO
- Born: 10 September 1848
- Died: 22 November 1917 (aged 69)
- Military career
- Allegiance: United Kingdom
- Branch: Royal Navy
- Rank: Admiral
- Commands: HMS Tribune; HMS Aeolus; HMS Terrible; HMS Repulse; HMS Flora; HMS Cambrian; South East Coast of America Station
- Awards: Commander of the Royal Victorian Order

Admiral Robert Leonard Groome (10 September 1848 – 22 November 1917) was a Royal Navy officer and Commander-in-Chief of the South East Coast of America Station.

== Naval career ==
Promoted to captain on 4 August 1890, Groome became commanding officer of the cruiser HMS Tribune in July 1893, of the protected cruiser HMS Aeolus in January 1894 and of the protected cruiser HMS Terrible in June 1897. He went on to be commanding officer of the battleship HMS Repulse in December 1897, then of the cruiser HMS Flora in June 1899 as Commander-in-Chief of the South East Coast of America Station. He transferred to the protected cruiser HMS Cambrian in May 1901, while still in command in South America. After that he became Rear-Admiral, Portsmouth Division in January 1905 and Rear-Admiral, Channel Fleet in November 1905. He served as Director of Transports at the Admiralty from November 1907 to December 1911 holding the rank of vice-admiral.

Military offices
Preceded by Charles Norcock	Commander, South East American Station; 1899–1902	Succeeded by Frank Finnis
