= John Purvis (Royal Navy officer) =

Vice-Admiral John Purvis
- Portrait by Erminio Bettinotti, 1843
- Born: 12 August 1787
- Died: 1 October 1857 (aged 70); Gosport
- Military career
- Allegiance: United Kingdom
- Branch: Royal Navy
- Service years: 1799–1857
- Rank: Vice-Admiral
- Commands: South East Coast of America Station; Queenstown

Vice-Admiral John Brett Purvis (12 August 1787 – 1 October 1857) was a Royal Navy officer who became Commander-in-Chief, South East Coast of America Station.

== Naval career ==
Born the son of Admiral John Child Purvis, Purvis joined the Royal Navy in 1799. Promoted to commodore, he became Commander-in-Chief, South East Coast of America Station in March 1842. Promoted to rear admiral on 9 November 1846, he went on to be Commander-in-Chief, Queenstown in June 1852 and was promoted to vice admiral on 4 July 1853.

Military offices
Preceded by Thomas Sulivan	Commander-in-Chief, South East Coast of America Station; 1842–1844	Succeeded by Samuel Inglefield
Preceded by Manley Dixon	Commander-in-Chief, Queenstown; 1852–1855	Succeeded by George Sartorius
