= Provo Wallis =

Royal Navy officer (1791–1892)

Admiral of the Fleet Sir Provo Wallis GCB
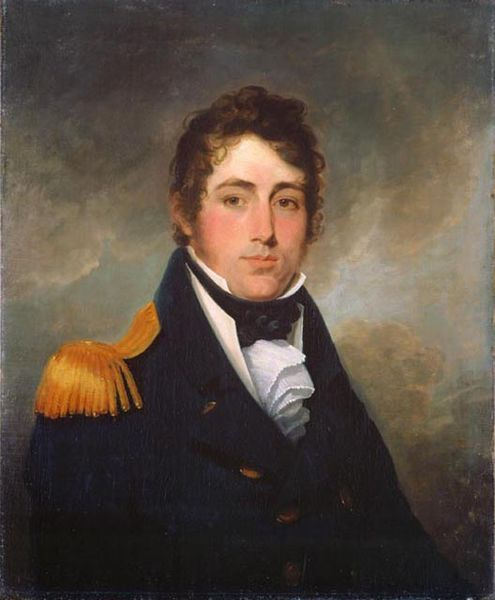
- Portrait by Robert Field, 1813
- Born: Provo William Parry Wallis; 12 April 1791; Halifax, Nova Scotia
- Died: 13 February 1892 (aged 100); Funtington, England
- Military career
- Allegiance: Great Britain; United Kingdom
- Branch: Royal Navy
- Service years: 1795–1892
- Rank: Admiral of the Fleet
- Commands: HMS Snipe; HMS Niemen; HMS Madagascar; Senior Naval Officer, Gibraltar; South East Coast of America Station
- Conflicts: War of 1812; Pastry War
- Awards: Knight Grand Cross of the Order of the Bath

Signature
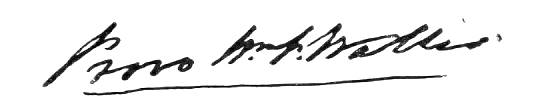

Admiral of the Fleet Sir Provo William Parry Wallis, GCB (12 April 1791 – 13 February 1892) was a Royal Navy officer. As a junior officer, following the capture of USS Chesapeake by the frigate HMS Shannon during the War of 1812, the wounding of HMS Shannon's captain and the death of her first lieutenant in the action, he served as the temporary captain of HMS Shannon as she returned to Halifax, Nova Scotia, with Chesapeake.

As commanding officer of the fifth-rate HMS Madagascar, Wallis earned the thanks of the people of Veracruz in Mexico when he protected them from French bombardment during the Pastry War. He went on to be Senior Naval Officer, Gibraltar, and then Commander-in-Chief on the South East Coast of America Station. Wallis was promoted to senior flag officer positions and was still carried on the active list at 100 years old when he died.

== Early career ==
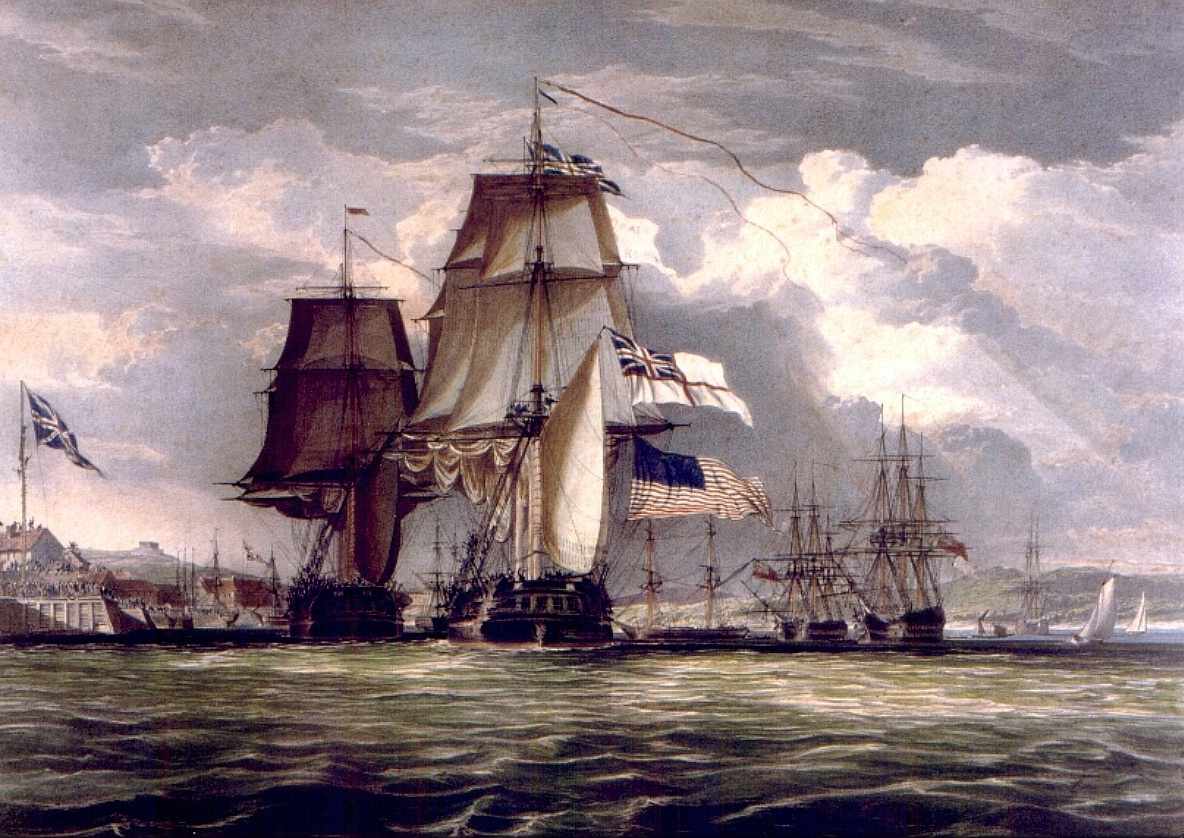
Wallis commanded HMS Shannon on her return to Halifax with her prize, after the capture of USS Chesapeake

He was the son of Provo Featherstone Wallis, a clerk at the Royal Naval Dockyard, Halifax, Nova Scotia, by his wife Elizabeth Lawlor. Wallis benefited from his father's desire to secure a naval career for his son. Knowing the rules for an officer's entry into the navy, his father managed to get him officially registered in May 1795, at the age of four, as an able seaman on the 36-gun frigate HMS Oiseau, under Captain Robert Murray.

In May 1798, young Provo became a volunteer in the 40-gun frigate HMS Prevoyante where he remained (on paper at least) until September 1799 when he joined the 64-gun third-rate HMS Asia. He served on HMS Asia until September 1800, when he was promoted to midshipman in the 32-gun fifth-rate HMS Cleopatra. HMS Cleopatra was the first ship he actually served aboard – he physically joined the ship in October 1804 – but by now he had amassed nearly a decade of seniority. In an action on 16 February 1805, HMS Cleopatra was captured by the French frigate Ville de Milan and the ship's company taken prisoner of war. Wallis was freed a week later when Ville de Milan was itself captured by the Royal Navy: he transferred to Ville de Milan which now became a British ship.

Wallis transferred to the third-rate HMS Triumph in November 1806 and to the third-rate HMS Bellona in February 1808 and, having been promoted to lieutenant on 13 November 1808, he transferred again to the sloop-of-war HMS Curieux later that month. HMS Curieux ran aground and was wrecked on the coast of Guadeloupe in November 1809 and Wallis transferred to the fifth-rate HMS Gloire in December 1809. He subsequently served in the sloops HMS Observateur, HMS Driver and HMS Emulous.

Wallis transferred to the 38-gun frigate HMS Shannon in January 1812. HMS Shannon captured USS Chesapeake near Boston on 1 June 1813, during the War of 1812: HMS Shannon's Captain, Philip Broke, was badly wounded during the action and her first lieutenant was killed.

Wallis served as the temporary captain of the British frigate for a period of exactly six days as she made her way back to Halifax, Nova Scotia, with Chesapeake flying the Blue Ensign above the Stars and Stripes, for which action he was promoted to commander on 9 July 1813.

Wallis was given command of the sloop HMS Snipe at Sheerness in January 1814. Promoted to captain on 12 August 1819, he became commanding officer of the sixth-rate HMS Niemen at Halifax in June 1824 and commanding officer of the fifth-rate HMS Madagascar on the North America and West Indies Station in April 1838. He earned the thanks of the people of Veracruz in Mexico when he protected them from French bombardment in Winter 1838 during the Pastry War.

Appointed as commodore (but remaining a post captain in substantive rank) he went on to be Senior Naval Officer, Gibraltar, with his broad pennant of the third-rate HMS Warspite, in October 1843.

== Senior command ==
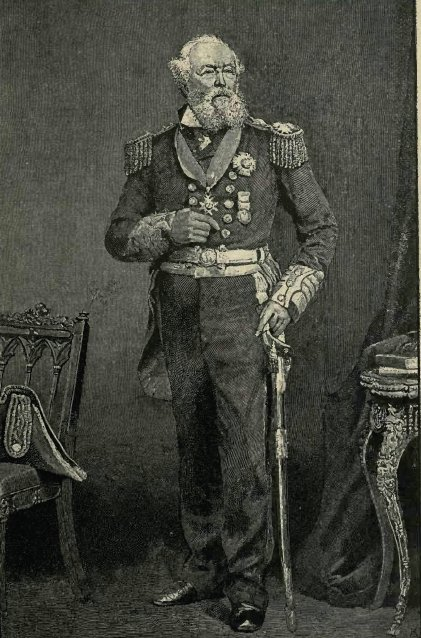
Wallis in the uniform of a senior flag officer

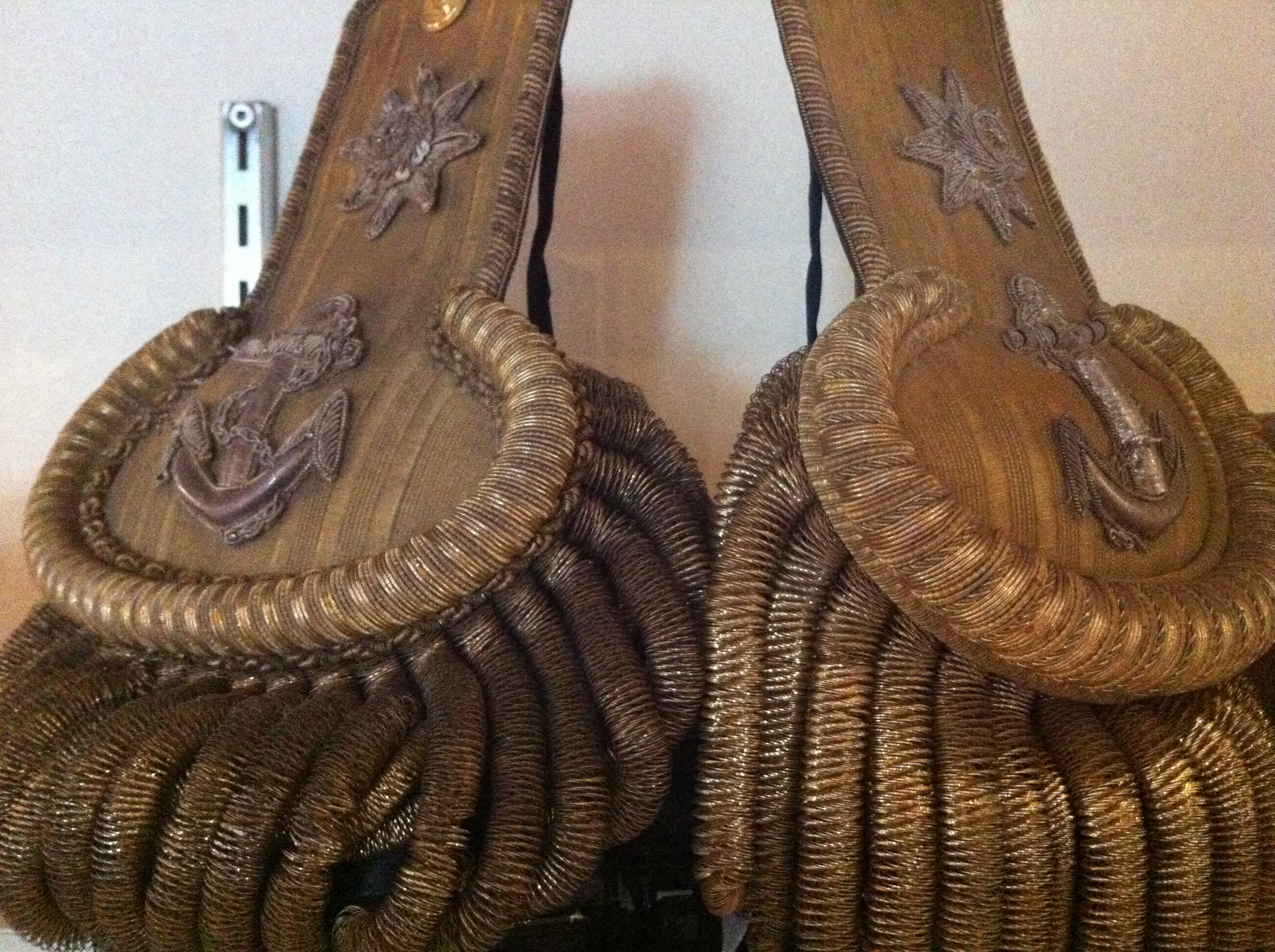
Wallis's epaulettes displayed in the Naval Museum of Halifax, CFB Halifax

Promoted to rear-admiral on 27 August 1851, Wallis became Commander-in-Chief, South East Coast of America Station, with his flag in the third-rate HMS Cumberland, in May 1857 but only held the command until September 1857. He was promoted to vice-admiral on 10 September 1857, appointed a Knight Commander of the Order of the Bath on 18 May 1860 and promoted to admiral on 2 March 1863. He was appointed Rear-Admiral of the United Kingdom on 17 July 1869 and Vice-Admiral of the United Kingdom on 12 February 1870.

In order to prevent admirals from dying as paupers, a special clause in the retirement scheme of 1870 provided that those officers who had commanded a ship before the end of the Napoleonic Wars should be retained on the active list: the six days Wallis was in command of HMS Shannon qualified him to remain on the active list until he died. He was advanced to Knight Grand Cross of the Order of the Bath on 24 May 1873 and promoted to Admiral of the Fleet on 11 December 1875. The Admiralty suggested he retire when he reached his late nineties, as being on the active list meant he was liable for calling up for a seagoing command. Wallis instead replied he was ready to accept one.

Wallis died at his country home in Funtington in West Sussex on 13 February 1892 and was buried in St Mary's churchyard at Funtington. He was only a few months short of his 101st birthday with a combined service of 96 years from the time his name first appeared on the books of a Royal Navy ship. He was the last survivor of the action between HMS Shannon and USS Chesapeake, and on his death, four admirals below him on the active list were able to gain immediate promotion.

== Family ==
On 17 October 1817 Wallis married Juliana Massey; they had two daughters. Following the death of his first wife, he married Jemima Wilson, daughter of Sir Robert Wilson, on 21 July 1849.

== Legacy ==
Wallis House in Ottawa is named after Wallis; the City of Ottawa has erected brass plaques, which were unveiled in 1990 and 1997 documenting the history of the building. The former Canadian Coast Guard Ship CCGS Provo Wallis was also named after him. The main street in the Naval dockyard of Halifax, Nova Scotia, is also named "Provo Wallis Street" in his honour.

== Effective dates of promotion ==
Promotions
| Rank | Date |
|---|---|
| Admiral of the Fleet | 11 December 1877 |
| Admiral | 2 March 1863 |
| Vice-Admiral | 10 September 1857 |
| Rear-Admiral | 27 August 1851 |
| Captain | 19 August 1819 |
| Commander | 9 July 1813 |
| Lieutenant | 11 November 1808 |
| Able seaman | 1 May 1795 |

== See also ==
- O'Byrne, William Richard (1849). "Wallis, Provo William Parry" . A Naval Biographical Dictionary . John Murray – via Wikisource.

== Sources ==
- Ellis, James H. (2009). A Ruinous and Unhappy War: New England and the War of 1812. United States: Algora Publishing. ISBN 9780875866901.
- Heathcote, Tony (2002). The British Admirals of the Fleet 1734 – 1995. Pen & Sword. ISBN 0-85052-835-6.
- Clowes, William Laird, Sir (1996–1997). The Royal Navy: a history from the earliest times to the present. Chatham Pub.

Military offices
| Preceded by William Hope-Johnstone | Commander-in-Chief, South East Coast of America Station; May 1857– September 1857 | Succeeded by Stephen Lushington |
Honorary titles
| Preceded by Sir Fairfax Moresby | Rear-Admiral of the United Kingdom; 1869–1870 | Succeeded by Sir William Hope-Johnstone |
| Preceded by Sir Fairfax Moresby | Vice-Admiral of the United Kingdom; 1870–1876 | Succeeded by Sir Michael Seymour |
