= William Henderson (Royal Navy officer) =

Royal Navy admiral

Rear-Admiral William Henderson CB KH
- Born: 1788
- Died: 1854 (aged 65–66); At sea
- Military career
- Allegiance: United Kingdom
- Branch: Royal Navy
- Service years: 1799–1854
- Rank: Rear-Admiral
- Commands: South East Coast of America Station
- Conflicts: HMS Edinburgh; HMS Victory; Egyptian–Ottoman War
- Awards: Companion of the Order of the Bath; Knight of the Royal Guelphic Order

Rear-Admiral William Willmott Henderson, CB, KH (1788–1854) was a Royal Navy officer who became Commander-in-Chief, South East Coast of America Station.

== Naval career ==
Henderson joined the Royal Navy in May 1799. Promoted to captain on 9 October 1815, he became commanding officer of the third-rate HMS Edinburgh in July 1837 and saw action in operations off the coast of Syria in 1840 during the Egyptian–Ottoman War. He went on to be commanding officer in HMS Victory at Portsmouth in September 1841 and Commander-in-Chief, South East Coast of America Station in July 1851. He died at sea in 1854.

Military offices
Preceded by Thomas Herbert	Commander-in-Chief, South East Coast of America Station; 1851–1854	Succeeded by William Hope-Johnstone
