= Bartholomew Sulivan =

British naval officer and hydrographer (1810–1890)

Admiral Sir Bartholomew Sulivan KCB
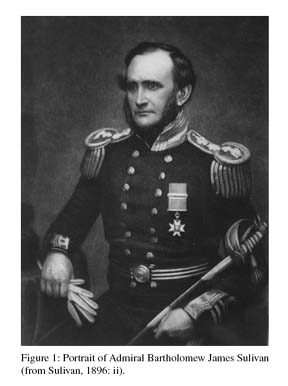
- Born: Bartholomew James Sulivan; November 18, 1810; Mylor, Cornwall, England
- Died: January 1, 1890 (aged 79)
- Military career
- Allegiance: United Kingdom
- Branch: Royal Navy
- Rank: Admiral
- Conflicts: Crimean War

Admiral Sir Bartholomew James Sulivan, KCB (18 November 1810 – 1 January 1890) was a British naval officer and hydrographer. He was a leading advocate of the value of nautical surveying in relation to naval operations.

Sulivan was born at Mylor, Cornwall, near Falmouth, the son of Rear Admiral Thomas Ball Sulivan.

His early career included service under Robert FitzRoy on the second voyage of HMS Beagle from 1831 to 1836 with Charles Darwin, during which Bartolomé Island in the Galapagos Islands was named after him. From 1842 to 1846 he commanded HMS Philomel on the South American Station and surveyed the Falkland Islands.

He was the commander of the combined Anglo-French fleet at the Battle of Vuelta de Obligado which took place on 20 November 1845.

During the Crimean War he was sent by Sir Francis Beaufort, Hydrographer of the Navy, to the Baltic to assist the fleet commanded by Sir Charles Napier. Sulivan, commanding the paddle steamer HMS Lightning, made many invaluable surveys and charts of the shallow waters in which the fleet had to operate, and led the bombardment ships into position during the capture of Bomarsund in 1854. From 1856 to 1865 he was the naval professional member of the Board of Trade. He was promoted to vice-admiral in 1870, and admiral in 1877. After Robert FitzRoy killed himself in 1865, leaving his wife and daughter destitute, Sulivan convinced the British government to provide them with £3,000, to which Charles Darwin contributed another £100 of his own money.

He was appointed a Companion of the Order of the Bath (CB) in July 1855 and later a Knight Commander of the Order of the Bath (KCB) in the June 1869 Birthday Honours.

He was married to Sophia, daughter of vice-admiral James Young and his wife Charlotte Ann, née Fyers; their son, Henry Norton Sulivan (1848 or 1849 to 1941) edited his father's Life and letters.

The Falkland Islands issued a set of stamps in 1985 for "Early Cartographers maps", the ship Philomel is featured on the fourth in set, 54p stamp along with a portrait of Admiral Sir B. J. Sulivan K.C.B.
