= William Hope-Johnstone =

Royal Navy Admiral (1798–1878)

Admiral Sir William Hope-Johnstone KCB
- Born: 28 July 1798
- Died: 11 July 1878 (aged 79)
- Military career
- Allegiance: United Kingdom
- Branch: Royal Navy
- Rank: Admiral
- Commands: HMS Doris; HMS Asia; HMS Britannia; HMS Agincourt; HMS Albion; South East Coast of America Station; Nore Command
- Awards: Knight Commander of the Order of the Bath

Admiral Sir William James Hope-Johnstone KCB (28 July 1798 – 11 July 1878) was a Royal Navy officer who became Commander-in-Chief, The Nore.

== Naval career ==
Born the second son of Vice-Admiral Sir William Johnstone Hope, William James Hope-Johnstone joined the Royal Navy in 1811. Promoted to captain in 1823, he commanded HMS Doris, HMS Asia, HMS Britannia, HMS Agincourt and then HMS Albion. He was appointed Superintendent of Haslar Hospital and the Royal Clarence Victualling Yard in 1852, Commander-in-Chief, South East Coast of America Station in 1854 and Commander-in-Chief, The Nore in 1860.

There is a memorial to Hope-Johnstone at the Johnstone Church Burial Ground in Dumfries.

== Family ==
In 1826 Hope-Johnstone married Eleanor Kirkpatrick; they had three daughters.

== Sources ==
- O'Byrne, William Richard (1849). "Johnstone, William James Hope" . A Naval Biographical Dictionary . John Murray – via Wikisource.

Military offices
Preceded by William Henderson	Commander-in-Chief, South East Coast of America Station; 1854–1857	Succeeded by Provo Wallis
Preceded by Sir Edward Harvey	Commander-in-Chief, The Nore; 1860–1863	Succeeded by Sir George Lambert
Honorary titles
Preceded by Sir Provo Wallis	Rear-Admiral of the United Kingdom; 1870–1878	Succeeded by Sir William Martin
