= Timothy S. Sullivan =

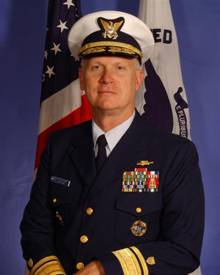
- Born: Milwaukee, Wisconsin
- Allegiance: United States of America
- Branch: United States Coast Guard
- Service years: 1971–2013
- Rank: Rear Admiral
- Commands: Pacific Maintenance and Logistics Command
- Conflicts: September 11 attacks
- Awards: Legion of Merit (three awards); Meritorious Service Medal (five awards); Coast Guard Commendation Medal (three awards); Coast Guard Achievement Medal

Timothy Shawn Sullivan is a retired rear admiral in the United States Coast Guard who served as the Deputy Commander, Pacific Area Coast Guard Defense Forces West. He was assigned as Commander of the Pacific Maintenance and Logistics Command, but was detached from those duties while serving as Deputy PACAREA. He has also served as the First Coast Guard District Commander and Commander, Maritime Defense Command One as well as the Senior Military Advisor to the Secretary of Homeland Security serving as the primary coordinator between the Departments of Defense and Homeland Security as well as operational advisor to the Secretary during Hurricanes Katrina and Rita.

== Early life and career ==
A native of Greendale, Wisconsin, Sullivan graduated from the United States Coast Guard Academy in 1975, and later earned a master's degree in Communication Arts/Public Affairs from Cornell University. He is also a graduate of Harvard University, Kennedy School of Government Senior Executive National and International Security Program.

Prior to becoming a flag officer, Sullivan served as Pacific Area, Eleventh Coast Guard District Chief of Staff for a geographical area encompassing over 73 million square miles. He commanded Group San Francisco during the 9/11 national crisis.

His shipboard commands include the Coast Guard Cutter MALLOW in Honolulu, and the Coast Guard Cutter JUNIPER, homeported in Newport, RI, where he had the distinction of being the first "Plankowner" Commanding Officer. He was also the Commanding Officer and "Plankowner" of the Eastern Regional Recruiting Command in Norfolk, Virginia. Prior to that, he served as Commanding Officer of the Coast Guard LORAN station on the island of Saipan in the Western Pacific.

Other afloat tours include Deck Watch Officer aboard the Coast Guard Cutters MESQUITE and ACACIA in Sturgeon Bay, and Executive Officer aboard the Coast Guard Cutter PAPAW in Charleston, South Carolina. Staff assignments include Eighth District Public Affairs Officer, Coast Guard Headquarters Chief of Media Relations, Press Assistant to the Commandant and Ninth District Chief of Aids to Navigation and Waterways Branch.

== Awards and decorations ==
He has been awarded The Coast Guard medal, the Legion of Merit (3), the Meritorious Service Medal (5), the Coast Guard Commendation Medal (3), the 9-11 Medal and the Coast Guard Achievement Medal. He is also authorized to wear the Cutterman's Insignia.

== See also ==
- Organization of the United States Coast Guard
