= Thomas Ball Sulivan =

English naval officer

Rear-Admiral Thomas Ball Sulivan CB
- Born: 5 January 1781; Cawsand, Cornwall
- Died: 17 November 1857 (aged 76); Flushing, Cornwall
- Spouse: Henrietta James (m. 1808)
- Relatives: Sir Bartholomew Sulivan (son)
- Military career
- Allegiance: United Kingdom
- Branch: Royal Navy
- Service years: 1786–1846
- Rank: Rear-admiral
- Commands: HMS Eclipse; HMS Woolwich; HMS Weser; HMS Talavera; HMS Stag; South East Coast of America Station
- Conflicts: French Revolutionary Wars; Expedition to Ostend; Napoleonic Wars; Action of 23 August 1806; War of 1812; Battle of Queen Anne; Battle of Baltimore

Rear-Admiral Thomas Ball Sulivan CB (5 January 1781 – 17 November 1857) was a Royal Navy officer who became Senior Officer, South East Coast of America Station.

== Life ==
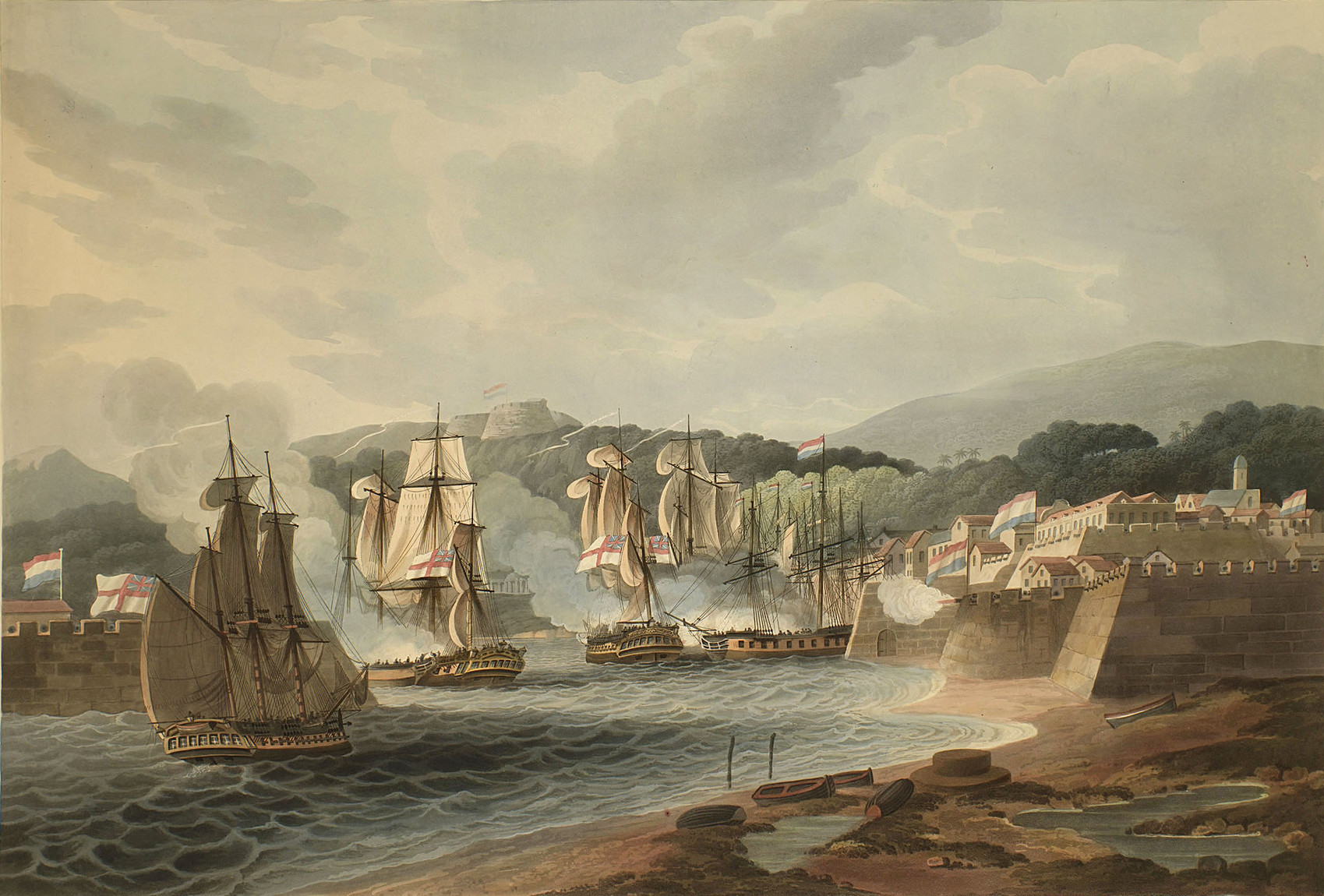
The capture of Curaçao, depicted by Thomas Whitcombe

Sulivan was born in Cawsand, Cornwall on 5 January 1780. By 1786, he was recorded on board HMS Triumph in Portsmouth, then under the command of Samuel Hood, 1st Viscount Hood. He served on several different naval ships until 1793, when he was sent to Mediterranean to take part in French Revolutionary Wars, including being part of the crew of HMS Southampton that captured Utile in 1796, and was promoted to lieutenant the following year.

Sulivan took part in the expedition to Ostend to destroy the Bruges Canal in May 1798 and was present at the bombardment of the Port of Granville in September 1803. In 1807, he took part in the capture of Curaçao, and was promoted to commander for his efforts. in 1813, after a few commands, his ship HMS Woolwich was wrecked in a hurricane, although the crew was saved and Sulivan was acquitted by the subsequent court martial.

He commanded a naval brigade at the Battle of Bladensburg in August 1814 during the War of 1812. He went on to be commanding officer of the third-rate HMS Talavera at Plymouth in March 1836 and, having been promoted to Commodore, he became Senior Officer, South East Coast of America Station in 1838.

On 19 March 1808, Sulivan married Henrietta, daughter of Rear-Admiral Bartholomew James. They had fourteen children, four of whom entered the navy. His son, Bartholomew Sulivan, was a naval officer and hydrographer. He received a CB on 5 June 1815.

Sulivan died at his home in Flushing, Cornwall on 17 November 1857.

== See also ==
- O'Byrne, William Richard (1849). "Sulivan, Thomas Ball" . A Naval Biographical Dictionary . John Murray – via Wikisource.
- Laughton, John Knox (1898). "Sulivan, Thomas Ball" . In Lee, Sidney (ed.). Dictionary of National Biography. Vol. 55. London: Smith, Elder & Co.

Military offices
Preceded by New Post	Commander-in-Chief, South East Coast of America Station; 1838–1841	Succeeded by John Purvis
