= South East Coast of America Station =

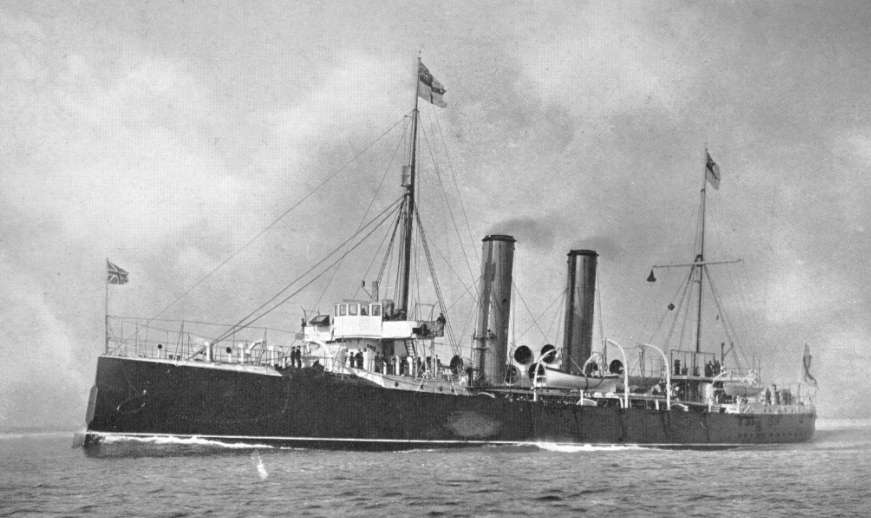
- HMS Retribution, flagship of the South East Coast of America Station
- Active: 1838–1905
- Country: United Kingdom
- Branch: Royal Navy
- Type: Formation
- Garrison/HQ: Stanley, Falkland Islands

The South East Coast of America Station was a formation of the Royal Navy which existed from 1838 until just after the end of the 19th century.

== History ==
The station was separated from the Pacific Station in 1838 in order to combat the slave trade in Brazil. In its early years it was often referred to as the "Brazils and River Plate Station". In the mid-1840s Rear Admiral Samuel Inglefield took decisive action to keep the Paraná River open so ensuring continuity of trade during the Uruguayan Civil War.

The station suffered significant ship reductions between 1869 and 1874. From 1870 it was commanded by a captain, designated the "senior officer", and comprised just three gunboats although it had responsibility for the Western Atlantic from Brazil South. The squadron's only permanent base was a coal station at Stanley on the Falkland Islands. It was disbanded altogether in 1905. Its area of operation, along with that of the Pacific Station, was ultimately absorbed, in 1928, into that of the North America and West Indies Station, with its main base at the Royal Naval Dockyard in the Imperial fortress colony of Bermuda, which was redesignated the America and West Indies Station.

== Commanders ==
Commanders included:

- Commodore Thomas Sulivan (1838–1841)
- Commodore John Purvis (1842–1844)
- Rear Admiral Samuel Inglefield (1844–1846)
- Commodore Thomas Herbert (1847–1849)
- Rear Admiral Barrington Reynolds (1849–1851)
- Rear Admiral William Henderson (1851–1854)
- Rear Admiral William Hope-Johnstone (1854–1857)
- Rear Admiral Provo Wallis (May 1857 – September 1857)
- Rear Admiral Stephen Lushington (1858–1860)
- Rear Admiral Henry Keppel (1860–1861)
- Rear Admiral Richard Warren (1861–1864)
- Rear Admiral Charles Elliot (1864–1866)
- Rear-Admiral George Ramsay (1866–1869)
- Commodore Charles James Norcock (1898–1899)
- Commodore Robert Leonard Groome (1899–1902)
- Commodore Frank Finnis (1902–1904)

== Sources ==
- Brown, David (1987). The Royal Navy and Falklands War. Pen & Sword Books. ISBN 978-0850520590.
- Bourne, Kenneth (2008). Britain and the Balance of Power in North America, 1815-1908. ACLS History E-Book Project. ISBN 978-1597404075.
- Heathcote, Tony (2002). The British Admirals of the Fleet 1734 – 1995. Pen & Sword. ISBN 0-85052-835-6.
- O'Hara, Vincent (2013). To Crown the Waves: the Great Navies of the First World War. Naval Institute Press. ISBN 978-1612510828.
- Preston, Antony; Major, John (2007). Send a Gunboat!: 150 Years of the British Gunboat. Conway. ISBN 978-0851779232.
