= Neville Usborne =

British naval officer

Neville Florian Usborne
- Born: 27 February 1883; Queenstown, Ireland
- Died: 21 February 1916, aged 32; Strood
- Burial place: Woodlands cemetery, Gillingham, Kent
- Military career
- Allegiance: United Kingdom
- Branch: Royal Navy; Royal Naval Air Service
- Service years: 1897-1916
- Rank: Wing Commander (RNAS)

Neville Florian Usborne (27 February 1883 – 21 February 1916) was a British naval officer who played a prominent part in British military lighter-than-air aviation before the First World War. He was involved with the construction of the first British rigid airship HMA No. 1 and was killed in one of the first experiments in launching an aeroplane from an airship.

== Biography ==
Usborne was born on 27 February 1883 in Queenstown, Ireland, the third son of George Usborne, a former naval officer who was deputy harbourmaster at Cork, and his wife Edith Josephine.

=== Early career ===
In 1897 he became a cadet in the Royal Navy, entering the training ship HMS Britannia. In 1898, now a midshipman, he achieved the second-highest marks in his year and was also awarded a prize for French. In December 1899 he was posted to HMS Canopus and in 1903 he was promoted to sub-lieutenant, and entered the newly formed submarine service, joining HMS Latona In January 1904 he was promoted to full lieutenant, with seniority back-dated to March 1903. and shortly afterwards posted to HMS Doris In March 1905 he was posted to the torpedo school at HMS Vernon.

=== Aviation career ===
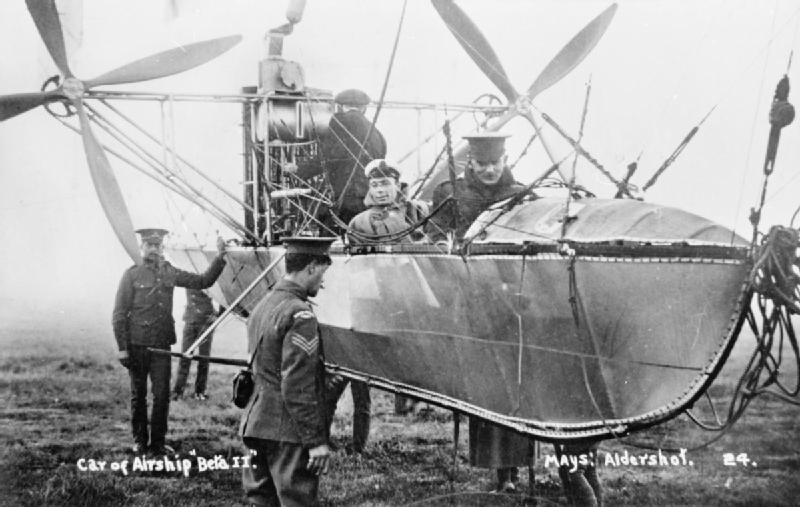
Usborne in the gondola of the airship Beta II, 1913

In 1909 he was sent to Barrow-in-Furness to supervise the construction of the Navy's first rigid airship, H.M.A. No. 1 being built by Vickers, and was posted to HMS Hermione, a cruiser acting as the tender for the airship, in September 1910. He is credited with having made significant contributions to the design of the airship, and the Inspecting Captain of Airships Murray Sueter later appointed him to be the captain of the airship when it was completed. Unfortunately the airship subsequently broke its back without having made a successful flight, and development was abandoned. Usborne remained attached to Hermione until January 1912. In April 1912 he was promoted to Squadron Commander in the RNAS.

His interest in flying was not confined to lighter-than air flight, and he took flying lessons at the Ewen School at Hendon, and was awarded Aero Club Certificate No. 449 on 1 April 1913. In October 1913 he was given command of HMA No. 3, an Astra-Torres airship, in which capacity he once had Winston Churchill, then First Lord of the Admiralty, as a passenger.

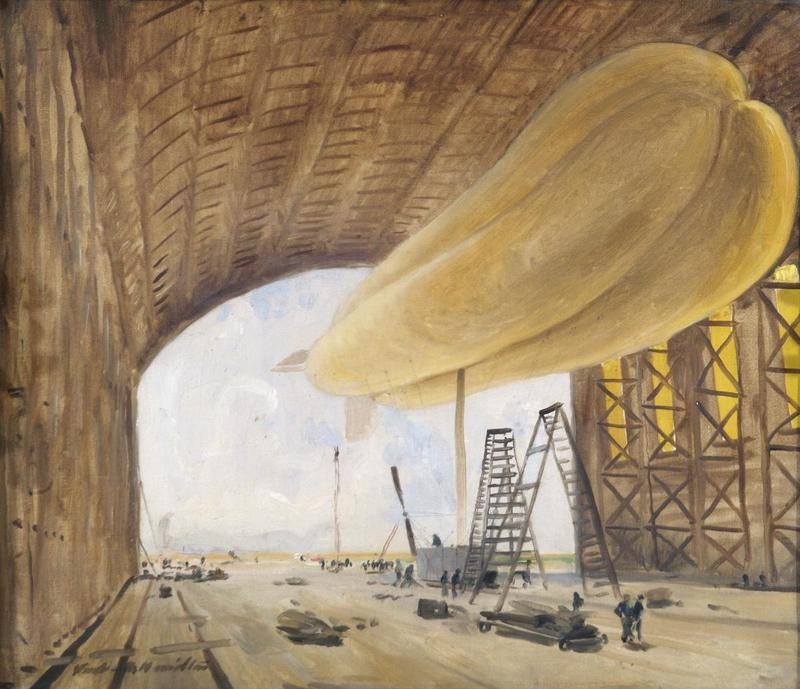
H.M.A.3 in the shed at Kingsnorth, painted by his father-in-law Vereker Hamilton

He was promoted to Commander on 1 January 1914, and in April 1914 was appointed the commanding officer of RNAS Kingsnorth. On 1 July 1914 Neville was promoted to Wing-Commander, and on 13 August 1915 he was appointed Inspector Commander of Airships at the Admiralty.

As a defence against the German Zeppelin bombing raids Usborne and Squadron Commander de Courcy Ireland (of RNAS Great Yarmouth) had developed a method of suspending a B.E.2c airplane from an envelope: this would be able to reach altitude quickly and patrol as an airship, the airplane being detached once a Zeppelin had been found. Some preliminary trials were made in August 1915, and a full trial was attempted on 21 February 1916. This trial, however, ended in disaster: the "airship-plane" had lifted off from RNAS Kingsnorth with Usborne and Ireland in the cockpit. They floated to an altitude of about 4,000 ft (1,200 m) when a sudden and unexpected loss of pressure in the envelope above them caused the envelope to buckle, in turn causing the forward suspension cable supporting the airplane to part. For a moment the plane hung vertically from the envelope, nose-down. Then the overloaded rear cables also failed, and the airplane began to fall in a slideslip: it then flipped, ejecting Ireland who fell 15 seconds to his death: Usborne remained with the plane until it crashed in Strood railway station goods yard, killing him.

=== Private life ===
He married Betty Hamilton, the daughter of Mr. and Mrs. Vereker Monteith Hamilton at St Margaret's, Westminster on 23 February 1914.

== Legacy ==
The Usborne Memorial Prize for best contribution to the Royal Aeronautical Society's publications written by a graduate or student was established in his memory.
