= Flying Squadron (United Kingdom) =

- Active: 1869–1870; 1870-72; 1896
- Country: United Kingdom
- Branch: Royal Navy
- Type: Squadron

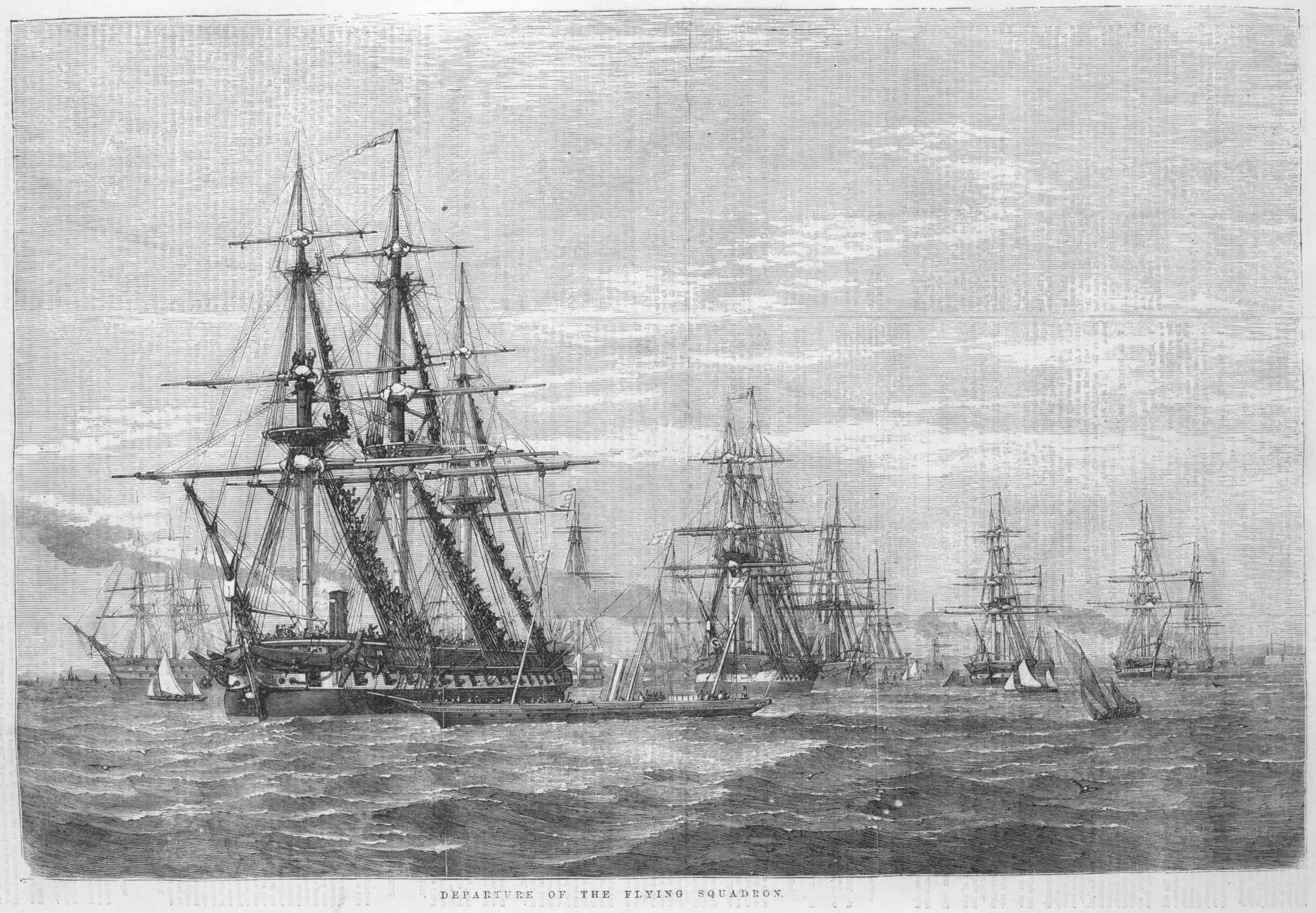
Departure of the Flying Squadron from Portsmouth for the Baltic in 1855. Illustrated London News

The Flying Squadron was a Royal Navy squadron formed at least three times. Its first formation existed from June 1869-November 1870.

== First formation, 1869–70 ==
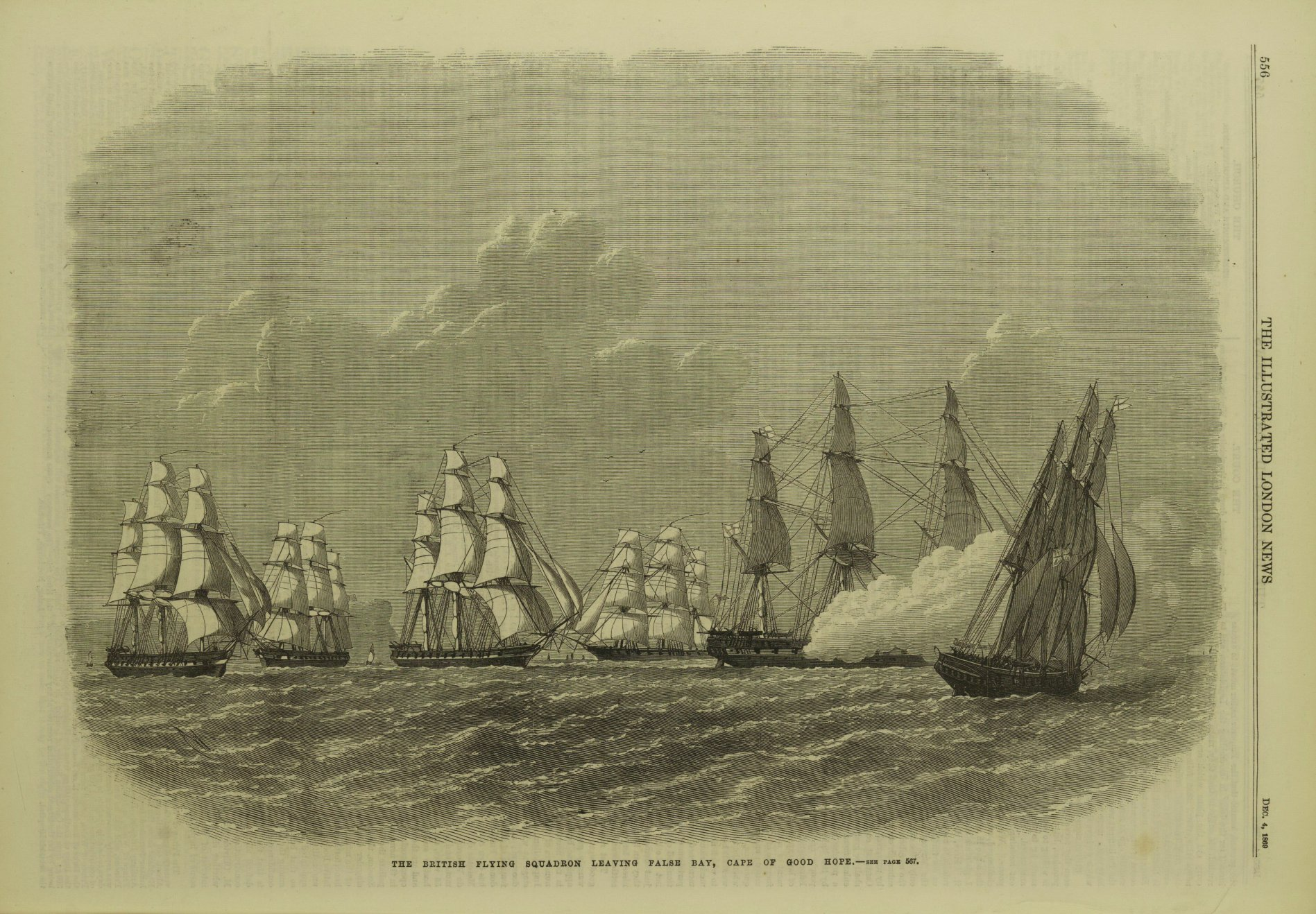
The British Flying Squadron of 1869 leaving False Bay, Cape of Good Hope, showing Liverpool (1860), Rattlesnake (1861), Scylla (1856), Endymion (1865), Bristol (1861), Barrosa (1860), and Seringapatam (1819). Illustrated London News 1869

The first Flying Squadron was established in 1869. It was made up, at various times, of ten wooden ships with auxiliary steam power. The squadron sailed from Plymouth on 19 June 1869. It called at Madeira, South America, South Africa, Melbourne, Sydney, and Hobart in Australia, Auckland, Wellington, and Lyttelton in New Zealand, Japan, Canada Hawaii, and Bahia in Brazil, before returning to England on 15 November 1870.

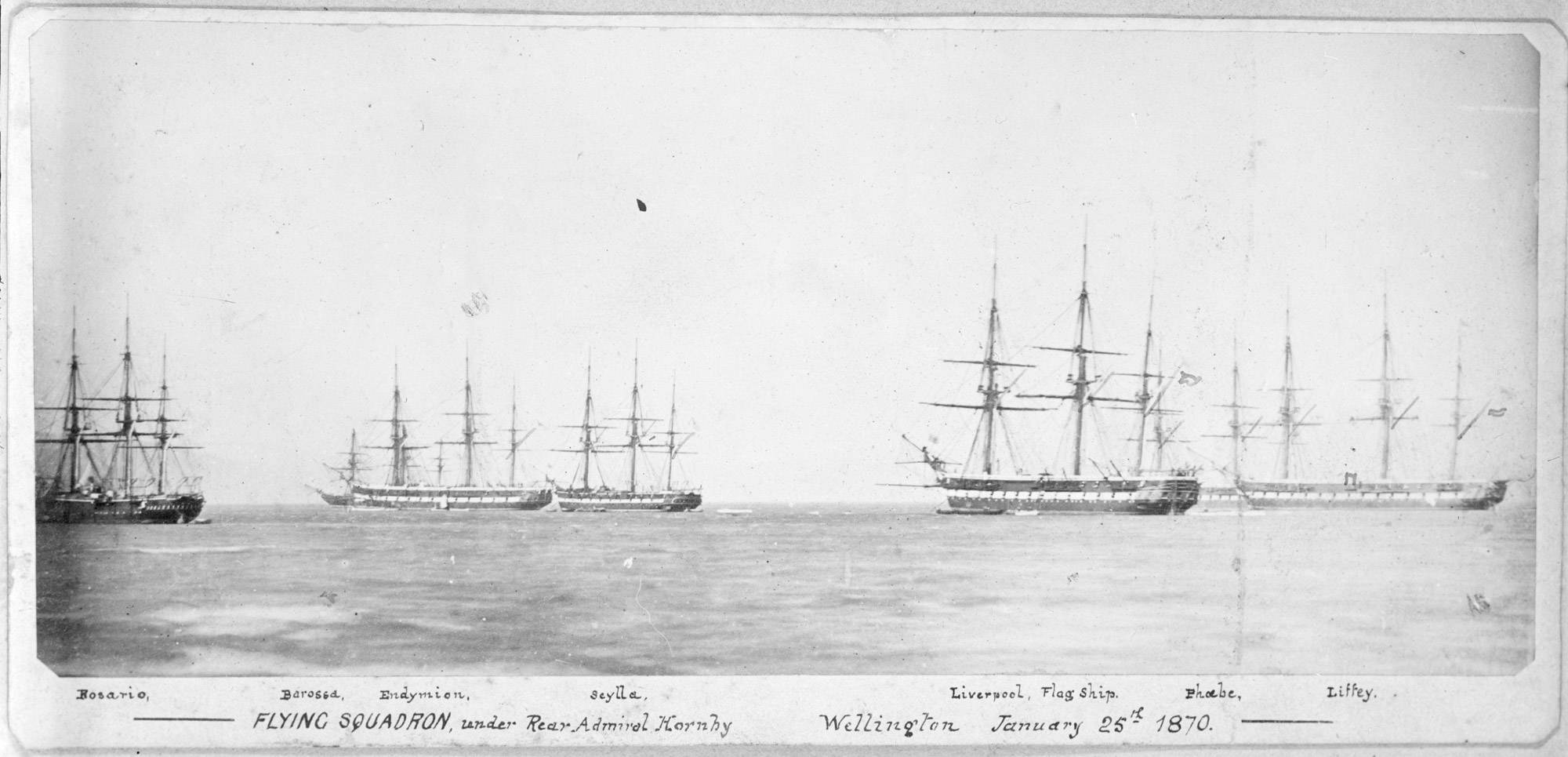
The Flying Squadron of 1869 under Rear-Admiral Hornby at Wellington, with ships Rosario, Barossa, Endymion, Scylla, Liverpool, Phoebe and Liffey.

Rear-Admiral Geoffrey Hornby commanded the squadron from 19 June 1869 – 15 November 1870, flying his flag from HMS Liverpool (1860). Other ships of the squadron included HMS Liffey, HMS Bristol (left at Bahia), HMS Endymion, HMS Scylla (left at Esquimalt), HMS Barrosa, HMS Phoebe, HMS Pearl, and HMS Charybdis. Between 1866 and 1870, HMS Satellite served in the Pacific with the Commander-in-Chief, China. She joined the Flying Squadron at Valparaíso in Chile, sailing home the rest of the way with them.

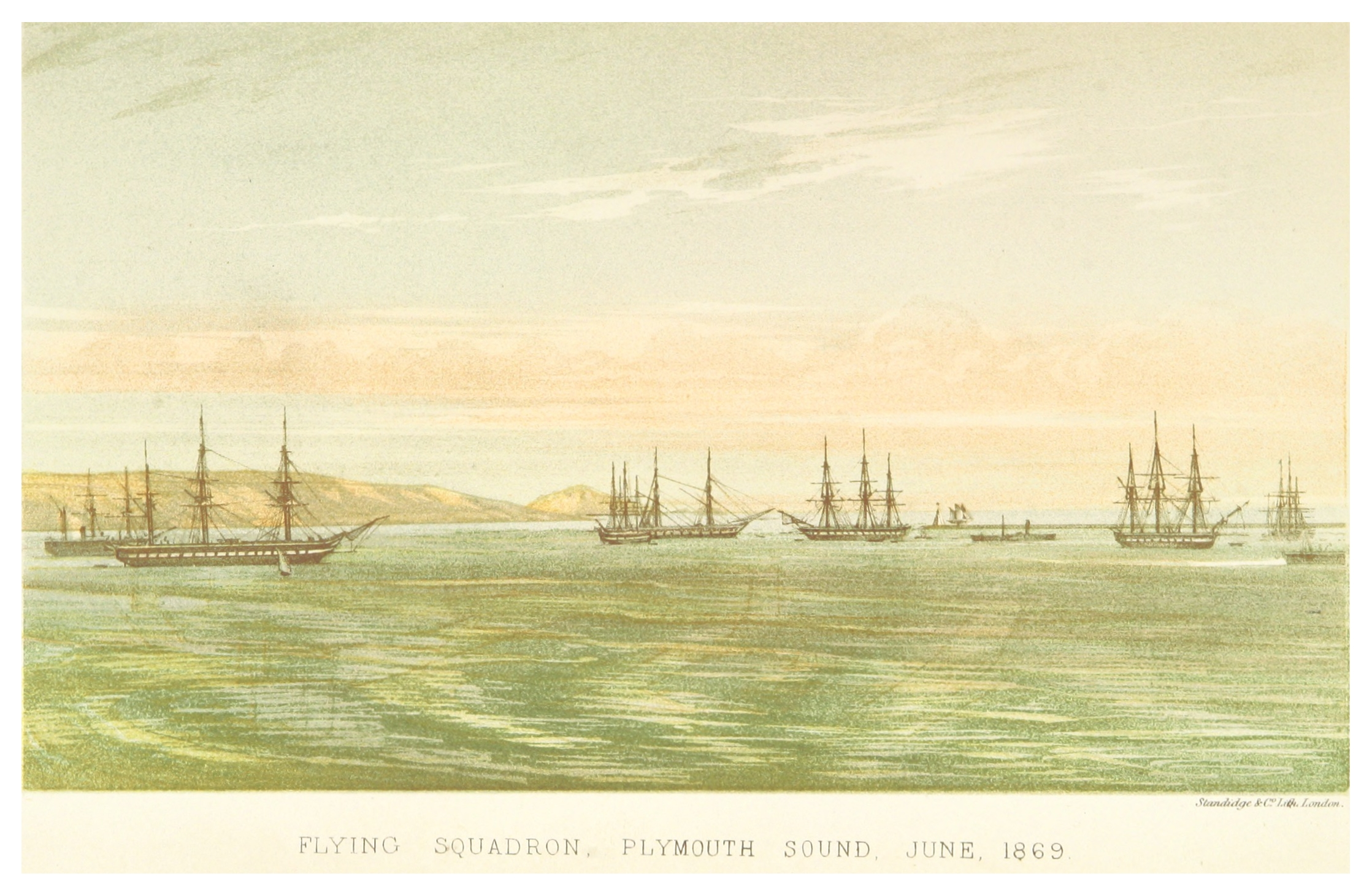
Plymouth Sound
(June, 1869)

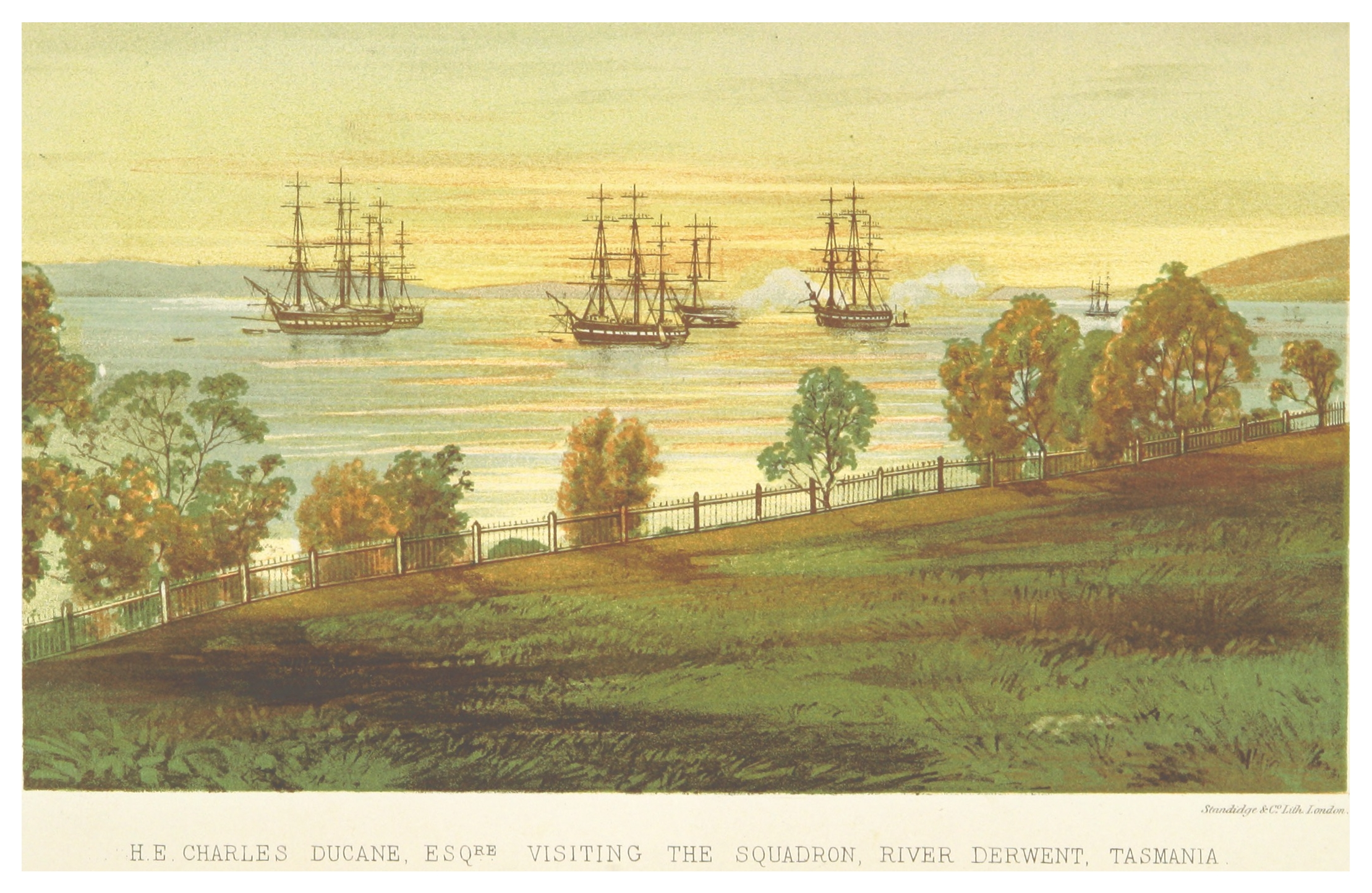
Hobart, Tasmania
(January, 1870)

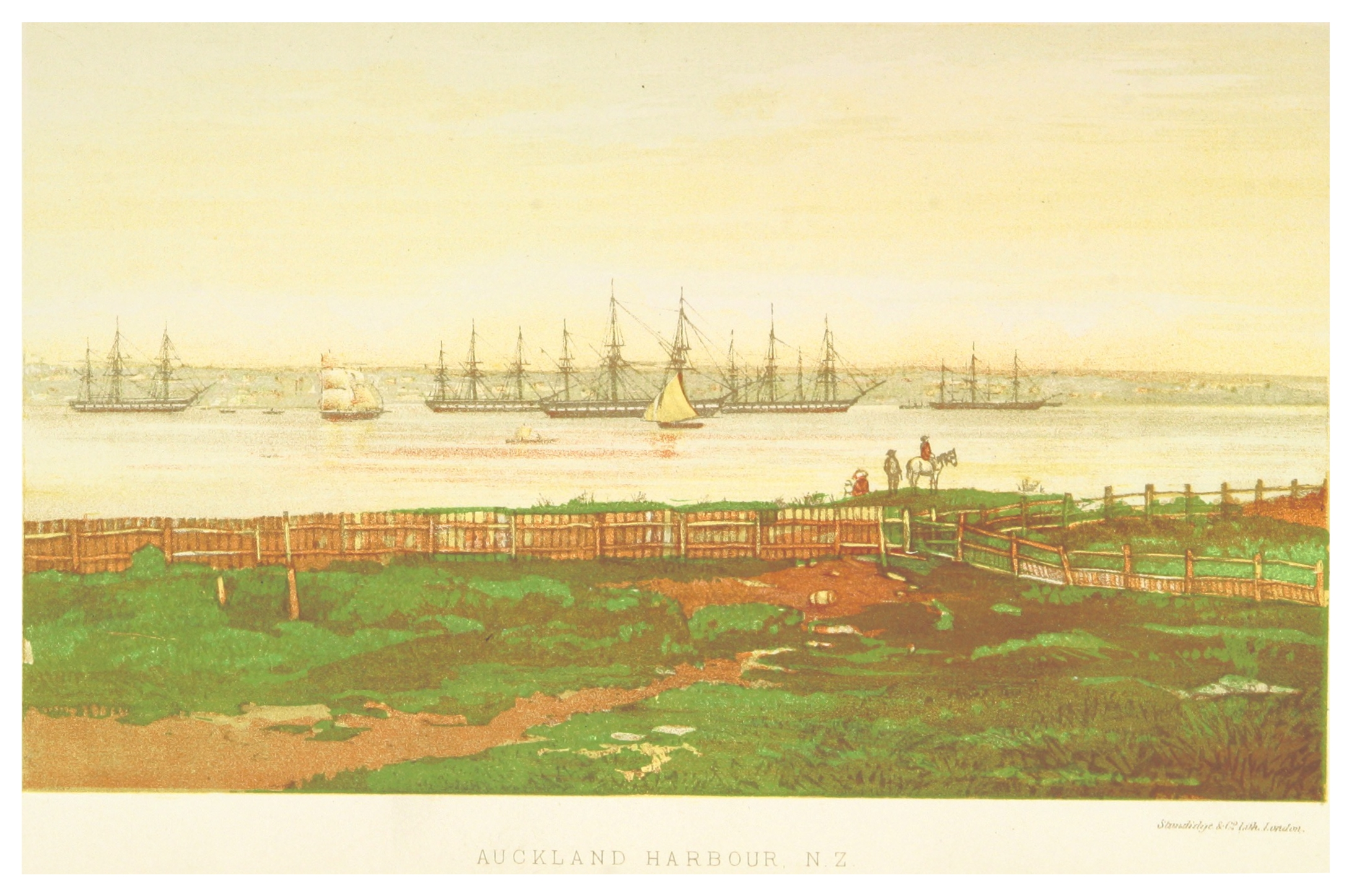
Auckland, New Zealand
(February, 1870)

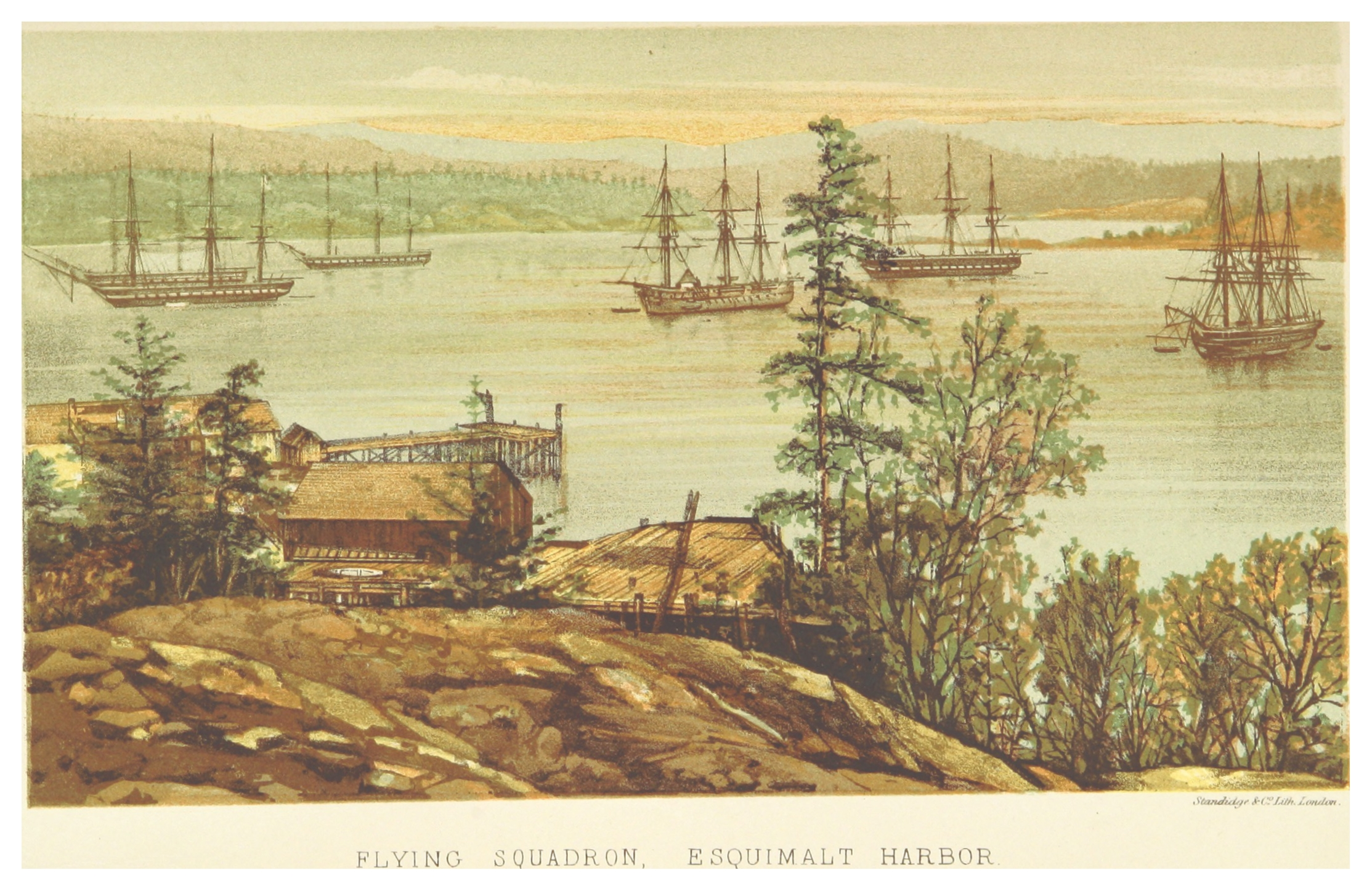
Esquimalt Bay, Canada,
(May, 1870)

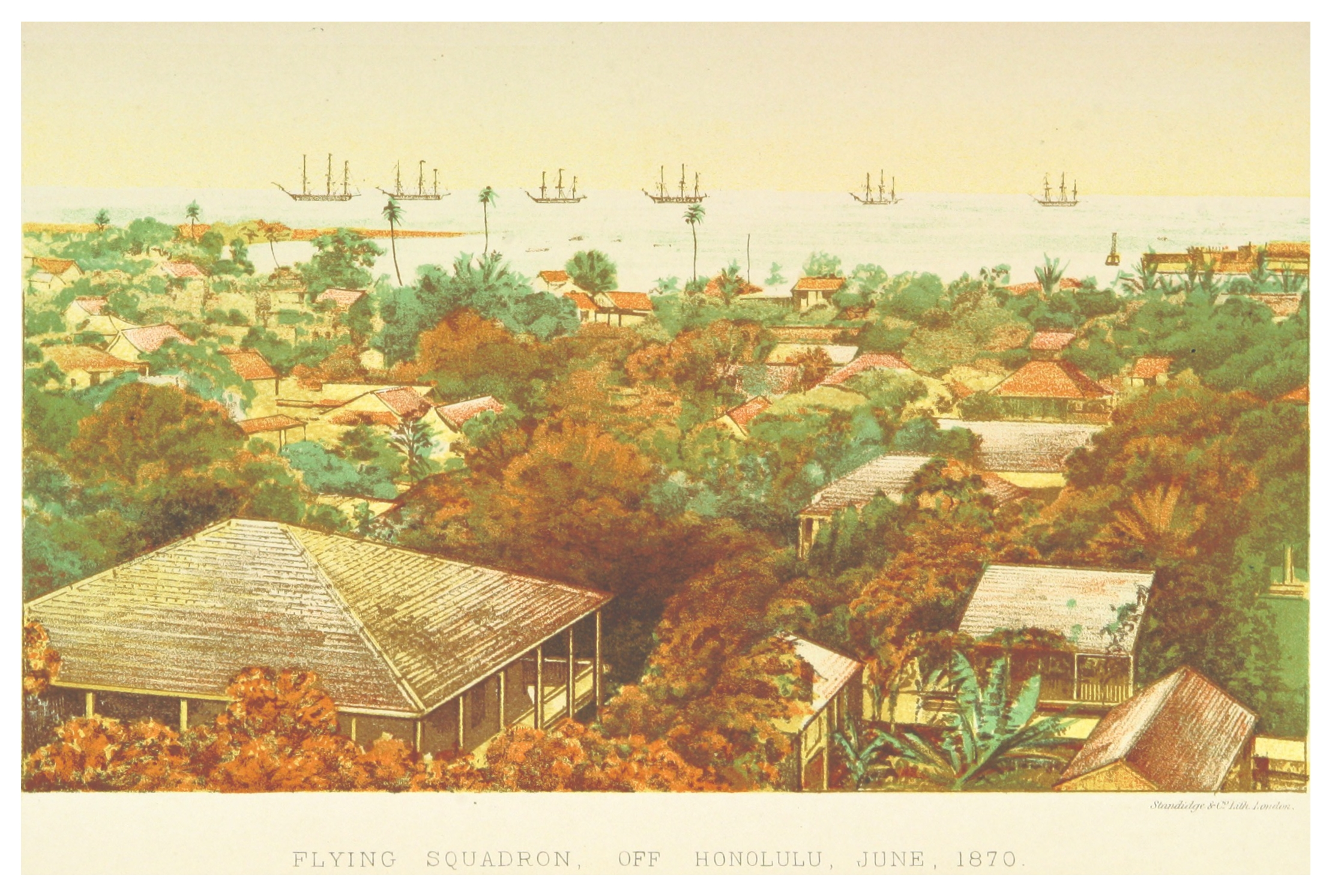
Honolulu, Hawaii
(June, 1870)

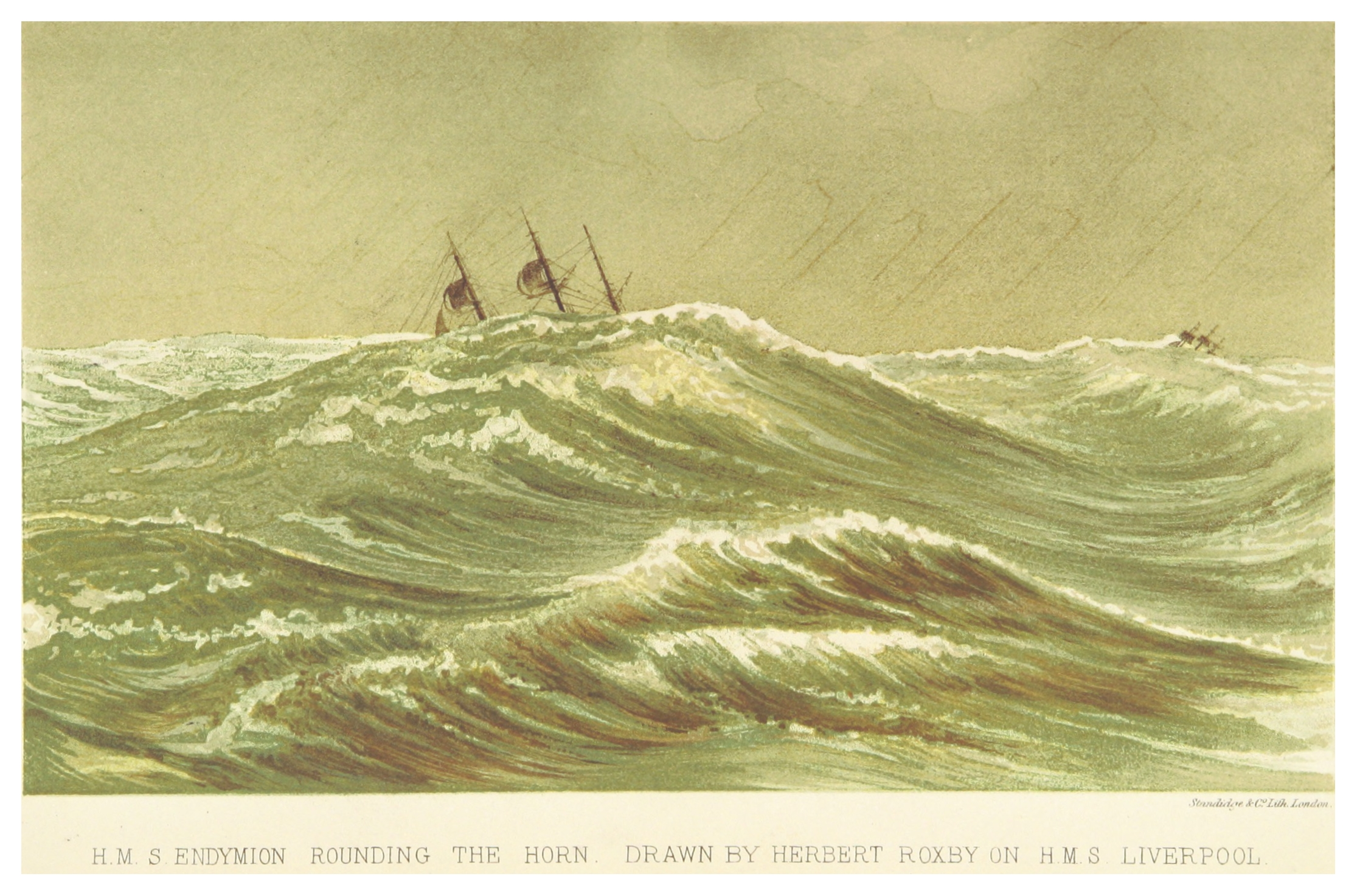
Rounding Cape Horn
(September 13, 1870)

== Second formation, 1870–72 ==
The second Flying Squadron was formed in 1870, mostly made up of wooden ships, but including the very new corvette HMS Volage, which circumnavigated the world to "show the flag". The squadron sailed from England on 3 December 1870 and called at Madeira, Brazil, the Cape of Good Hope, and the East Indies, before crossing the Pacific Ocean and returning to England at the end of 1872.

== Third formation, 1896 ==
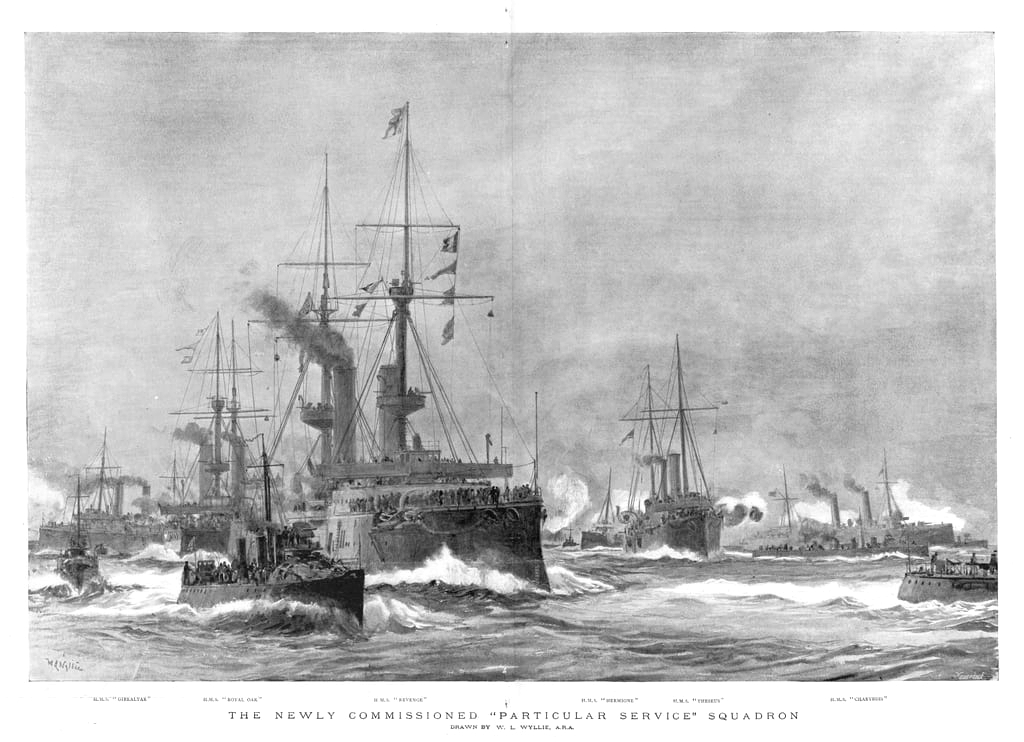
The newly commissioned Particular Service Squadron of 1896, a view of HMS Gibraltar, HMS Royal Oak, HMS Revenge, HMS Hermione, HMS Theseus, and HMS Charybdis. The Graphic 1898

The third Flying Squadron was a special Royal Navy squadron that operated during 1896.

Following the Jameson Raid in South Africa, the German Emperor Wilhelm II sent a telegram of support to President Kruger. This led to a war scare in Europe. To ready itself for the possibility of a war with the German Empire, the Royal Navy formed the Particular Service Squadron at Portsmouth, on 14 January 1896. It was soon renamed the Flying Squadron. Its flagship was the battleship Revenge, while the other ships in the squadron were the battleship Royal Oak, the Edgar-class cruiser Gibraltar and Theseus, and the Astraea-class cruisers Charybdis and Hermione. The squadron was commanded by Rear Admiral Alfred Taylor Dale.

The Flying Squadron was held in readiness for ten months, and briefly was attached to the Mediterranean Fleet in mid-1896. No war broke out, and the Flying Squadron was disbanded in November 1896.
