= HMS Hermione (1893) =

Astraea-class cruiser

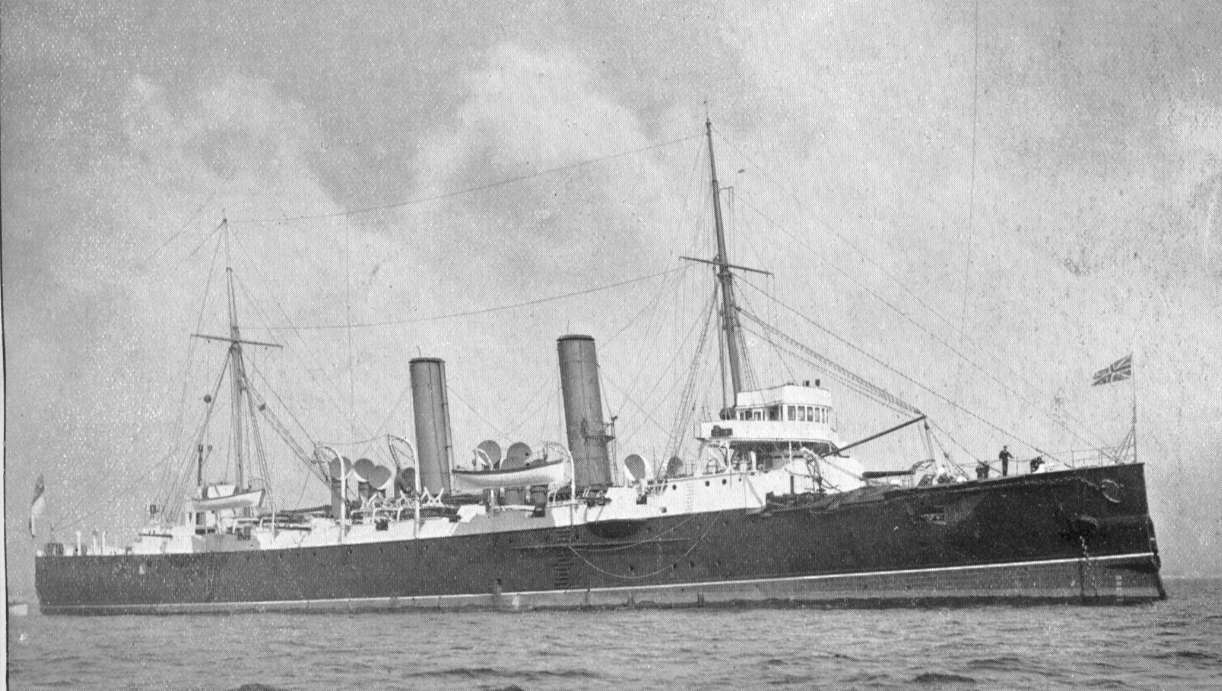

History

United Kingdom
- Name: HMS Hermione
- Laid down: December 1891
- Launched: 7 November 1893 at Devonport
- Renamed: TS Warspite on 18 December 1922
- Fate: Broken up September 1940

General characteristics
- Class & type: Astraea-class cruiser
- Displacement: 4,360 tons
- Length: 320 ft (98 m) (p/p)
- Beam: 49.5 ft (15.1 m)
- Draught: 21 ft 6 in (6.55 m)
- Propulsion: Triple expansion engines Two shafts 7,500 ihp
- Speed: 18 knots (33 km/h; 21 mph) (natural draught) 19.5 knots (36.1 km/h; 22.4 mph) (forced draught)
- Range: Carried 1000 tons coal (max)
- Complement: 318
- Armament: 2 × QF 6-inch (152.4 mm) guns; 8 × QF 4.7 in (120 mm) guns; 1 × 76 mm (3.0 in) gun; 2 × 6-pounder guns; 1 × 3-pounder gun; 4 × machine guns; 3 × 18 inch (450 mm) torpedo tubes
- Armour: Conning tower: 3–6 in (76–152 mm); Deck: 2 in (51 mm); Engine hatch: 5 in (130 mm)

HMS Hermione was an Astraea-class Royal Navy protected cruiser launched at Devonport in 1893. She served in World War I and was sold in 1921. She was renamed training ship Warspite in 1922, and broken up in 1940.

Hermione was a 10-gun twin-screw cruiser of 4360 tons, 9,000 horsepower (6,700 kW), and capable of 19 knots (35 km/h; 22 mph). The vessel was 320 feet (98 m) in length, had a beam of 49 feet (15 m), and a draught of 19 feet (5.8 m).

== Service history ==
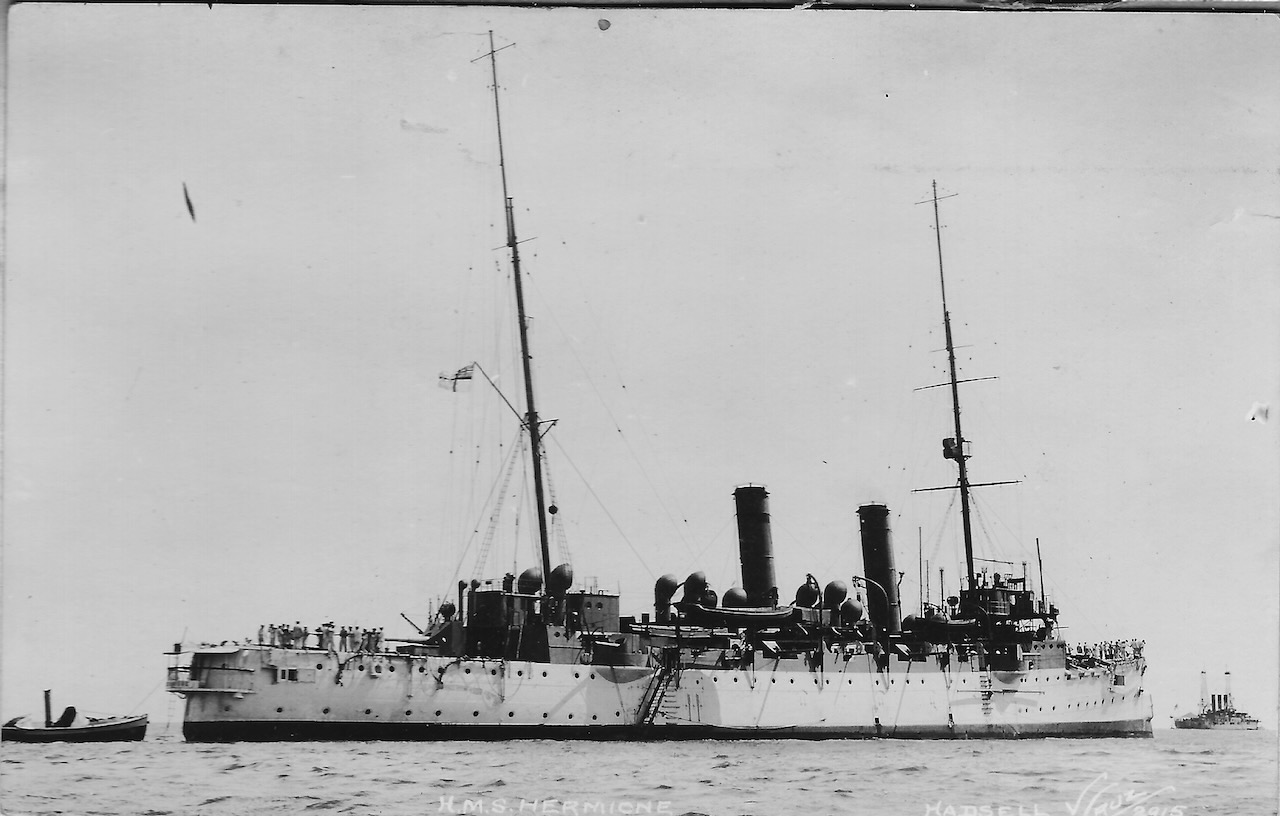
HMS Hermione, Royal Navy Astraea-class cruiser

In 1896 Hermione, commanded by Captain Charles R. Arbuthnot, was one six ships which was specially commissioned as part of a new squadron in reply to a congratulatory telegram from the German Emperor to President Paul Kruger on the repulse of Dr. Jameson's Raid. The squadron, known as the Particular Service Squadron, was commanded by Rear-Admiral Alfred Taylor Dale with his flag in Revenge.

Hermione was assigned to the China Station in 1898. In 1900 she played a minor part in the third China war or Boxer Rebellion. In December 1899 and April 1900, Marines from Hermione served as an honour guard and pallbearers for the funerals of the Governor of the Straits Settlements, Sir Charles Mitchell and the Chief Justice of the British Supreme Court for China and Corea, Sir Nicholas John Hannen, who had also served as consul-general in Shanghai.

In May 1902 she was posted to the Mediterranean station. Attached to the cruiser division, she visited Argostoli with other ships of the division in early October 1902. The following year she was in Aden in February 1903. In November 1904 the ship was at Suez to observe part of the Russian fleet on its eventual way to the Battle of Tsushima.

In 1906 Hermione went into reserve at Portsmouth, refitted in 1907 and sent to the Cape Town Station. On 14 February 1909 she ran aground at Zanzibar but was re-floated sustaining only slight damage. In June 1909 she joined the 3rd Cruiser Squadron at Portsmouth and in July joined the Home Fleet. On 6 August Hermione ran aground off Killingholme in the Humber and after 8 hours was re-floated.

In September 1910 she began preparations for use as a tender for the Royal Navy's first airship, but when this project was abandoned, she rejoined the Home Fleet in January 1912. In the meantime, she had hosted the first British seaplane experiments, with an Avro Type D in November 1911.

The major part of its 1913–1914 tour of duty involved Hermione being positioned off the Mexican coastal city of Tampico, to look after British interests and citizens working and living there. In April–May 1914 the Tampico Affair occurred. It led to U.S. forces occupying the port of Veracruz. This, and the encroachment of revolutionary forces on Tampico, resulted in a large number of refugees attempting to flee the city, and H.M.S. Hermione and her marines were centrally involved in the refugees' evacuation from Tampico. The entire log of H.M.S. Hermione has been transcribed and is available on the Royal Navy Log Books of the World War 1 Era website.

At the outbreak of World War I in August 1914, she became guard ship at Southampton, later becoming HQ Ship for motor launches and coastal motor boats from December 1916 until December 1919. Sold off in October 1921, she was then resold to The Marine Society on 18 December 1922 and renamed Warspite to replace an earlier training ship, until finally scrapped in September 1940.
