= HMA No. 1 =

Rigid airship of the Royal Navy (completed 1911)

HMA No. 1 "Mayfly"
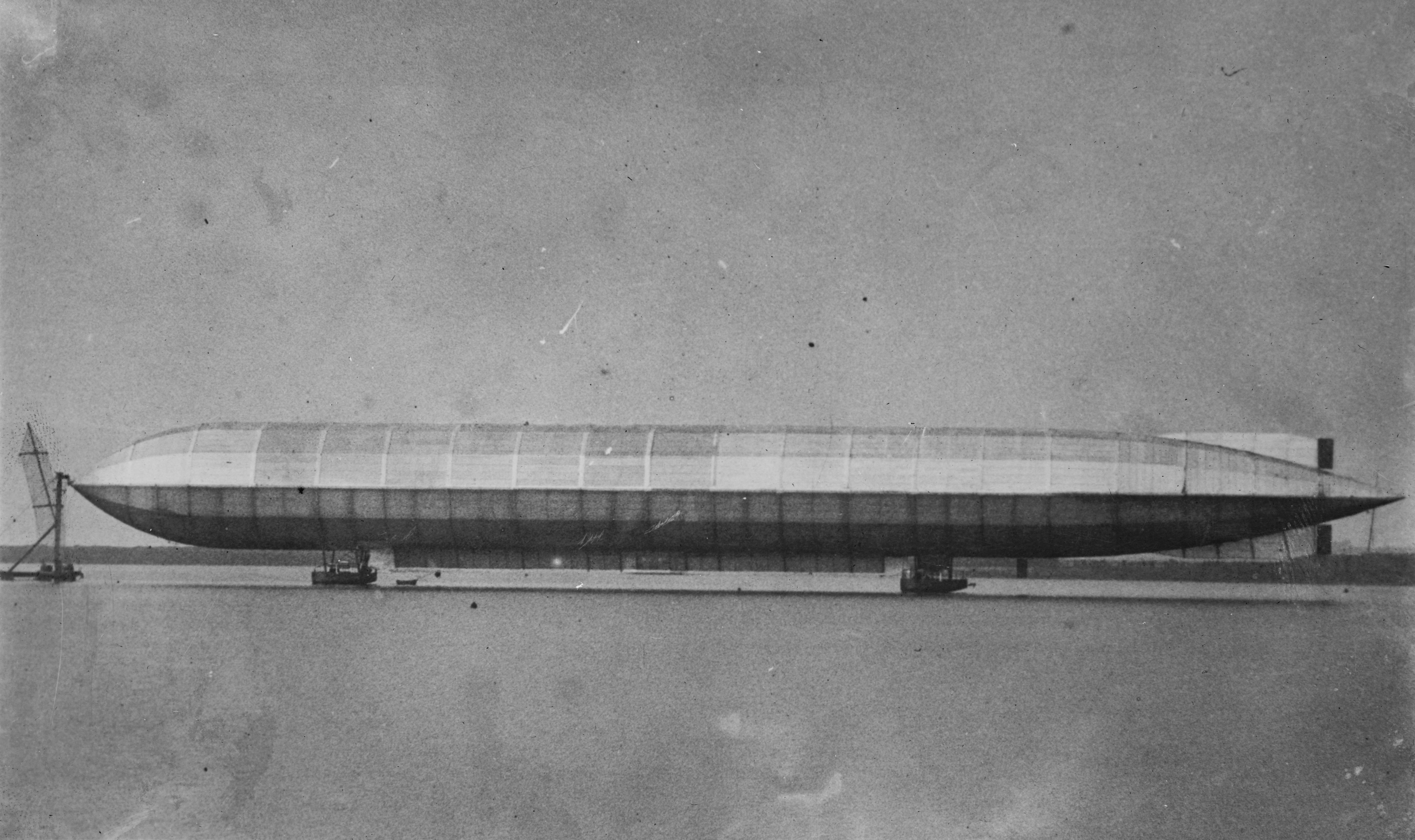
- HMA No. 1 Mayfly at its mooring, Barrow-in-Furness (September 1911)

General information
- Type: Aerial scout airship
- National origin: United Kingdom
- Manufacturer: Vickers
- Designer: C.G. Robertson; Lieutenant N.F. Usborne
- Status: Abandoned project; airship wrecked by winds on 24 September 1911
- Primary user: Royal Navy

History
- First flight: Never flown

His Majesty's Airship No. 1 was designed and built by Vickers, Sons and Maxim at their works in Barrow-in-Furness, Lancashire, England, as an aerial scout airship for the Royal Navy. It was the first British rigid airship to be built, and was constructed in a direct attempt to compete with the German airship programme. Often referred to as "Mayfly", a nickname given to it by the lower deck (i.e. the non-commissioned component of a naval ship's crew), in public records it is designated 'HMA Hermione' because the naval contingent at Barrow were attached to HMS Hermione, a cruiser moored locally preparing to act as its tender.

When it was moved from its shed in Cavendish Dock to conduct full trials on 24 September 1911 it broke in two before it could attempt its first flight as a result of being subject to strong winds. Although Mayfly never flew, its brief career provided valuable training and experimental data for British airship crews and designers.

== Background ==
In July 1908 Captain Reginald Bacon, the Royal Navy's Director of Naval Ordnance, recommended that the Navy should acquire an airship that would compete with the success of the early German rigid airships built by Count Ferdinand von Zeppelin. The British Government agreed that a sum of £35,000 (£3.6 million today) "should be allocated to the Admiralty for the building of a dirigible balloon", and in March 1909 the armament firm of Vickers, Sons and Maxim advised that they could construct the ship for £28,000 (£2.9 million today), not including the goldbeater's skin gas bags and outer cover, for which the Admiralty was required to provide contractors, and that they would erect a constructional shed at their own expense in return for a 10-year monopoly on airship construction, similar to the submarine agreement they already had with the Crown. The contract was awarded to Vickers on 7 May 1909, with design responsibility divided between Lieutenant N.F. Usborne at the Admiralty and C.G. Robertson of Vickers; however, the 10-year monopoly clause was refused.

== Design ==
Mayfly was intended to be an aerial scout, and was similar in design to contemporary Zeppelins, but with some major differences. At 512 ft (156 m) length and 46 ft (14 m) in diameter, it was 66 ft (20 m) longer than the contemporary LZ 6 and had a 50% larger volume, giving a correspondingly greater lift. His Majesty's Airship No. 1 was more commonly known as the "Mayfly", or simply referred to as "No. 1." In official records HMA No. 1 is often referred to by the name of the tender in which the crew was quartered, HMS Hermione, or the "Hermione Airship". The name Mayfly originated as a nickname originated by the sailors assigned to it. HMA No. 1 was essentially an experimental design and was therefore to be built as cheaply as possible.

Zeppelins of the time had a useful load of around 10,000 lb (4,500 kg) and were capable of flying at 37 mph (60 km/h). The Vickers design was intended to be moorable on water, carry wireless equipment, be capable of 40 kn (46 mph; 74 km/h) for 24 hours, have a ceiling of 1,500 ft (460 m), and carry a crew of 20 in comfort. The mooring was to be to a mooring mast, a practice that the British were the first to adopt as standard, and Mayfly was the first rigid airship to be fitted with the mooring equipment in the nose of the ship.

Before construction began an experimental section was constructed. This used a variety of construction techniques: one end used hollow timber spars, the centre frame used a combination of timber and aluminium, while the other end used aluminium only. Although wood proved the most satisfactory, the Admiralty preferred metal. In late 1909 duralumin became available, and it was decided to use this new alloy, which would allow a considerable weight saving while also forming a stronger structure. The use of Duralumin preceded its use by Zeppelin by four years. Development of HMA No. 1 involved essentially inventing the technology necessary and considerable experimentation in materials and manufacturing techniques was required before the final manufacturing processes were decided upon. The hull was made up of 40 twelve-sided transverse frames spaced 12.5 ft (3.8 m) apart: some of which were cross-braced by wires, dividing the structure into 17 bays of irregular length, varying from 12.5 ft to 37.5 ft (3.8 m to 11.4 m). The frames were connected by 12 longitudinal girders and a triangular section keel below the main structure. The hull shape was based on work by the American aerodynamicist Albert Zahm, and its head resistance was claimed to be 40% of that of contemporary Zeppelins. A fully streamlined shape had been proposed, but was rejected by the Admiralty as being too difficult to construct. It was not until 1918 that a truly streamlined airship, the R80, was designed.

Experiments were also carried out to determine the most suitable material for the outer cover, resulting in the choice of a treated silk. The covering of the upper half was additionally treated to reduce heat absorption by adding aluminium powder to the coating. This resulted in the underside of the ship being primrose yellow and the top aluminium coloured. The control surfaces, based on a design by Short Brothers and adopted after experiments by the National Physical Laboratory, consisted of quadruple rudders and triple elevators attached to the trailing edges of the cruciform tail surfaces, supplemented by forward mounted triplane elevators and small triple rudders behind the aft gondola.

The two gondolas were constructed of mahogany using the Consuta process to make them watertight so that the craft could be operated off water. Each contained a Wolseley 160 hp water-cooled V-8 piston engine, that in the front gondola drove a pair of 11 ft 10 in (3.61 m) diameter four-bladed propellers mounted on outriggers and geared to rotate at half engine speed. The rear engine drove a single 15 ft (4.6 m) two-bladed propeller mounted at the rear of the gondola. Equipment to recover water from the exhaust gases was fitted to replace the weight of fuel as it was consumed and so avoid the necessity to vent lifting gas. Considerable mistakes were made due to inexperience, Admiralty requirements, and in devices such as water recovery systems for engine exhaust.

== Construction and trials ==
The construction shed which also doubled as a hangar, was designed by Vickers and built from the wall of Cavendish Dock at their "Naval Construction Yard" in Barrow, out to piles driven into the basin floor. It contained a float on which construction of the airship took place and which could be taken out of the shed together with the airship. Beginning in 1909, the work was due to be completed in August that year and the ship delivered two months later, but in June trouble occurred with driving the piles into the floor of the dock. Consequently, the shed was not completed until June 1910, at which point the actual construction of HMA No. 1 could begin. A screen was erected in the dock together with a newly designed 38 ft (12 m)-high floating mooring mast that was capable of withstanding a steady pull of 80 tons (81 tonnes). A large safety margin had been allowed; the maximum load the ship would exert on the mast was calculated to be approximately 4 tons (4 tonnes) in a wind of 80 mph (130 km/h).

In preparation for the completion of Mayfly, crew training commenced on 25 February 1910, covering important skills such as working the rubber fabric (carried out at Messrs Short Brothers works, Battersea, London), instructions in petrol engines at Vickers works, and instruction in signals, aeronautics and meteorology.

An entry in Handbook for HMA No. 1 noted that:

Two crews were used to look after the ship whilst out, as the work was new. They lived on board the airship and suffered no discomfort at all although no provision had been made for cooking or smoking on board. At night the temperature of the living space was a little above that of the outside air, but as the ship proved quite free from draughts in the keel and the cabin, it was anticipated that with suitable clothing, no trouble would be experienced from the cold.

The Admiralty's officer responsible for the design of HMA No. 1, Lieutenant N.F. Usborne, was selected as captain.

The finished Mayfly was the largest airship yet constructed.

=== Static trials ===
Static trials inside the shed began on 13 February 1911. The motors were run and controls operated, but outdoor trials could not be carried out until the weather moderated.

On Monday 22 May 1911 Mayfly was removed from the shed for handling and mooring trials. It was towed stern first from its very narrow shed, then gradually swung out of Cavendish Dock and attached to a mooring mast mounted on a pontoon. While moored, nine officers remained on board (having quarters in the keel and telephone communication between the cars) to conduct engine trials, but these were cut short due to radiator problems. On the following day it was subjected to winds of 45 mph (72 km/h), and during the two nights it was out of the shed, searchlights were trained on it so that its movement could be observed. Mayfly showed no signs of rising, and it was discovered from calculations that the removal of fixtures weighing some three tons would be necessary to enable it to become airborne. It was decided to return it to the shed, where with all ballast, fuel and some equipment removed it floated for approximately five hours with both gondolas around 3 ft (0.91 m) out of the water. During this time the engineers were able to perform trim trials. It was obvious that drastic modifications to reduce weight must be made if HMA No. 1 was ever to fly.

The most drastic of the modifications was the removal of the external keel which resulted in both weakening and distorting the airship's framework. Hartley Pratt, a draughtsman working in another department at Vickers, calculated that this would be disastrous, but his warnings were ignored. Pratt subsequently left the company, but was re-hired to lead the design of the next British airship, the No. 9r which was ordered from Vickers in 1913. Other changes included deleting the forward elevators and the water recovery apparatus. The positions of the gondolas was also reversed, the heavier forward gondola being moved to the aft position. Also removed were the cabin and accommodations for the crew while in port. So extreme were the attempts to reduce weight that holes were drilled in engine control levers. The changes resulted in the Mayfly having a disposable lift of 3.21 tons. With the massive alterations Captain Murray Suter under pressure from the Admiralty solicitor was forced to provisionally accept No. 1 with the provision that she be flown.

=== Final outing ===
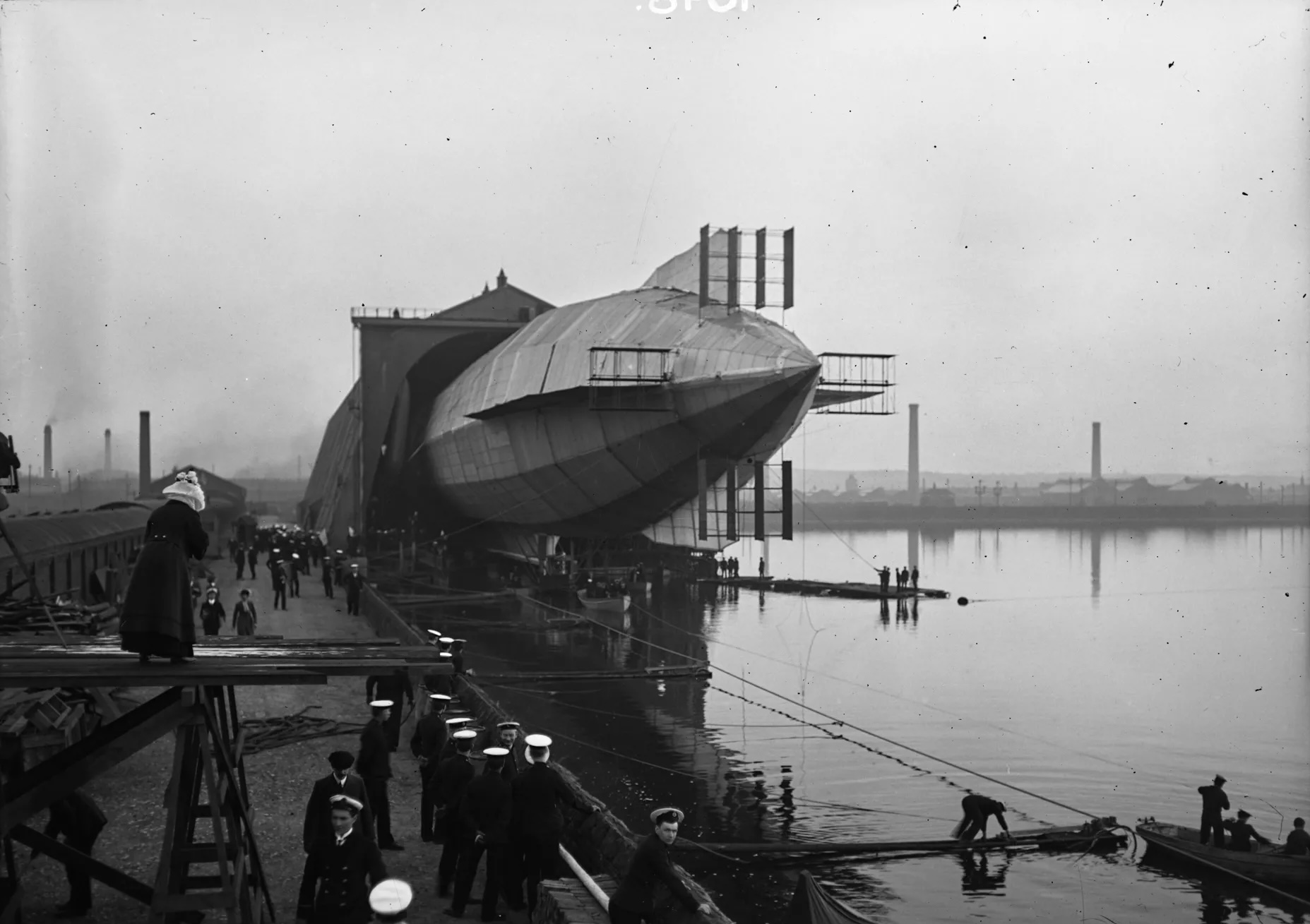
Mayfly emerging from its floating shed on 24 September 1911

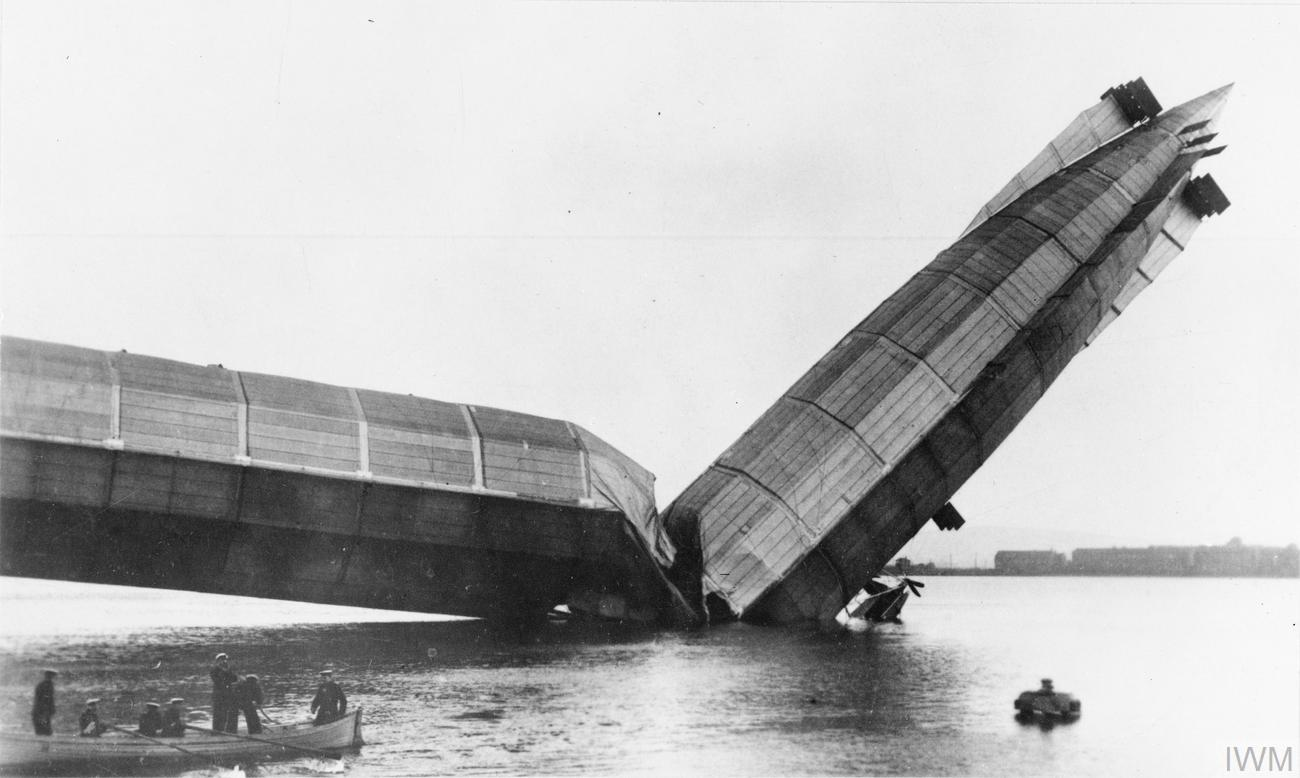
HMA No.1 after breaking its back

While under cover, an improved system was devised for removing Mayfly from the shed. This consisted of a series of electric winches that could gently ease it out, even in windy conditions, and on 24 September 1911 it was decided to move Mayfly from the hangar for full testing. Just as the nose cleared the hangar door, a gust caused the ship to roll virtually onto its beam ends. It eventually righted, but as it was being swung round so that the nose would point back out to the dock, there were cracking sounds amidships and it broke in two. At that point the centre started to rise, and the crew in the aft gondola dived overboard causing the stern to rise. Subsequent damage was caused by a bracing cable on the top of the hull, which held fast causing several frames to be severely damaged as the hull was moved by the wind. There were no fatalities, and the wreck was returned to the shed the same day.

A court of inquiry's conclusion was that no-one could be attributed the blame for the incident, and that it would be reasonable to support the story that the squall was to blame. It was of such a force that later ships would have also been severely damaged if they had encountered it under the same circumstances. Commander Masterman is reported as stating unofficially that, "Mayfly was pulled in half by the handling party when someone forgot to release the lines that tethered the bows of the ship." Furthermore, in an article entitled Twenty-One Years of Airship Progress Lt.Col. W. Lockwood Marsh wrote: "This accident, though the ship was undoubtedly weak, was directly due to a mistake in handling, one of the parties on a hawser continuing to haul in without noticing that the after car had fouled a buoy."

== Aftermath ==
Captain Murray Sueter proposed that No. 1 be repaired and used for mooring experiments. He also proposed the building of two more airships to keep intact the design and manufacturing capability.

Captain Reginald Bacon had left the Navy in 1909 and "Jackie" Fisher, who was an advocate of airship development was no longer First Sea Lord following his retirement. Winston Churchill, who became the First Lord of the Admiralty on 24 October 1911 was generally dismissive of airships, favouring the development of heavier-than-air aircraft. As a result, no attempt was made to repair the Mayfly and it was left to rot in its shed.

Churchill later made the following statement in House of Commons on 26 March 1913: "Altogether, compared with other navies, the British aeroplane service has started very well... I have a less satisfactory account to give of airships. Naval airship developments were retarded by various causes. The mishap which destroyed the May-fly, or the Won't Fly, as it would be more accurate to call it, at Barrow, was a very serious set-back to the development of Admiralty policy in airships." And on 31 March 1913 Sir Bolton Eyres-Monsell—who would himself later become First Lord of the Admiralty—made the following comment regarding the fate of Mayfly and the lack of British airships: "The 'May-fly' broke three years ago, and nothing further has been done. In non-rigid airships, Germany has seventeen, and against that we have two very inferior ones and two on order, but we are not doing anything in this respect."

Despite never having flown, the brief career of Mayfly provided valuable technical experience for British airship designers.

== Specifications ==
Data from Airships Heritage Trust, Flight International (sources do not agree on all values; and as Mayfly never flew, performance figures are theoretical. Engine data from Lumsden)

General characteristics

- Crew: 20
- Length: 512 ft 0 in (156.06 m)
- Diameter: 46 ft 0 in (14.02 m)
- Volume: 660,000 cu ft (19,000 m^{3})
- Empty weight: 44,000 lb (19,958 kg)
- Useful lift: 48,000 lb (22,000 kg)
- Powerplant: 2 × Wolseley 160 hp (each driving 2 propellers), 147 hp (110 kW) each

Performance

- Cruise speed: 42 mph (68 km/h, 36 kn)
- Range: 1,090 mi (1,750 km, 950 nmi)
- Endurance: 24 hours
- Service ceiling: 1,500 ft (460 m)
