= Alfred Taylor Dale =

Royal Navy admiral (1840–1925)

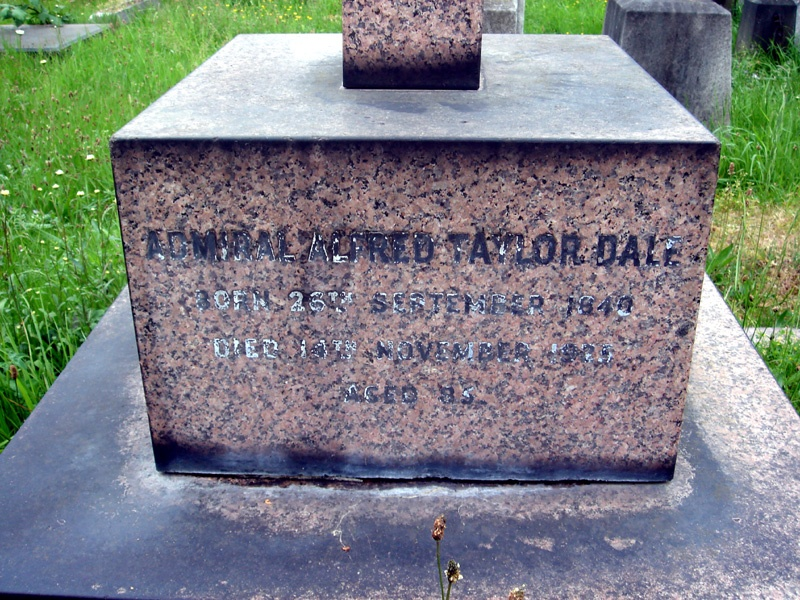
Funerary monument, Brompton Cemetery, London

Alfred Taylor Dale (26 September 1840 – 14 November 1925) was a Royal Navy admiral.

He joined the Royal Navy in 1854. Promoted to lieutenant on 14 April 1860, commander on 4 April 1870, captain on 31 December 1876, rear-admiral on 10 September 1891, vice-admiral on 16 September 1897, and admiral on 3 May 1903.

In April 1894, he was appointed second in command, Channel Squadron. In 1896, he commanded the Particular Service Squadron of six ships, specially commissioned in reply to a congratulatory telegram from Kaiser Wilhelm II to President Paul Kruger of South Africa on the repulse of Dr. Jameson's Raid. He was aboard the ship he commanded at that time, HMS Revenge, a Royal Sovereign class battleship.

An International Squadron was formed by a number of Great Powers to intervene during a native Greek rebellion against Ottoman rule on the island of Crete and to protect their citizens there. The squadron operated from February 1897 to December 1898, and its participating countries were Austria-Hungary, France, the German Empire, Italy, the Russian Empire, and the United Kingdom. Some of the participating British ships included the battleships Revenge under by then Rear-Admiral Alfred Taylor Dale, Hood and Empress of India.

He is buried at Brompton Cemetery, London.
