= Wolseley 160 hp =

1910s British piston airship engine

160 hp
- Type: Piston aero engine
- Manufacturer: Wolseley Motors Limited
- First run: c. 1910
- Major applications: HMA No. 1

The Wolseley 160 hp was a British V8, water-cooled aero engine that first ran in 1910, it was designed and built by Wolseley Motors. Its sole known use was in the ill-fated HMA No. 1 airship which broke in two while being removed from its shed on 24 September 1911.

== Applications ==
- HMA No. 1

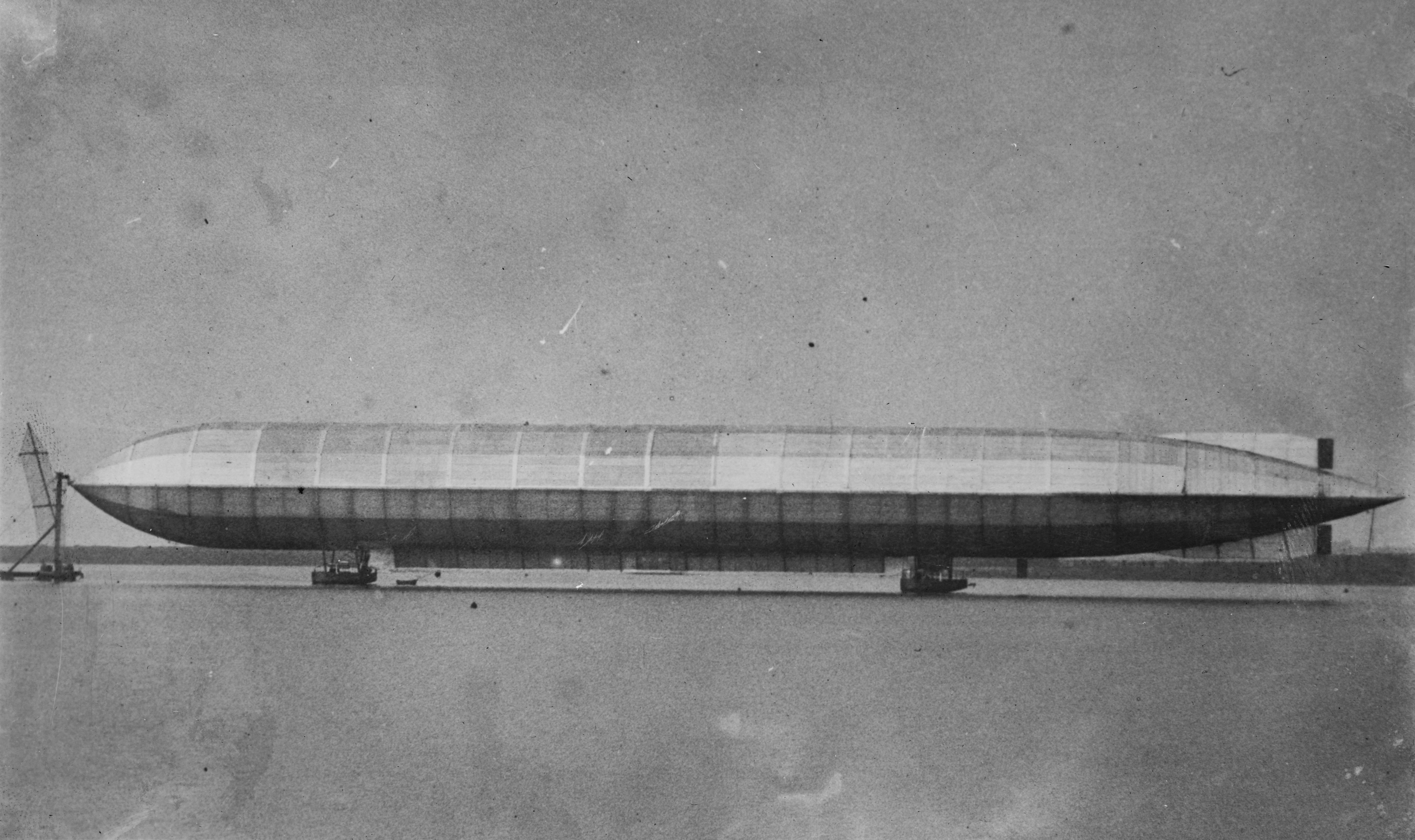
Airship HMA No. 1 Mayfly, built by Vickers, Sons and Maxim, powered by Wolseley 160 hp engines, September 1911

== Specifications (160 hp) ==
Data from Lumsden.

=== General characteristics ===
- Type: eight-cylinder, 90 degree, upright V-engine
- Bore: 5.0 in (127 mm)
- Stroke: 7.0 in (178 mm)
- Displacement: 1,100 cu in (18 L)

=== Components ===
- Fuel type: Petrol
- Cooling system: Water-cooled
- Reduction gear: Direct drive, right-hand tractor

=== Performance ===
- Power output: 147 hp (110 kW) at 1,200 rpm (maximum power for "short periods")
- Specific power: 0.13 hp/cu in (6.1 kw/L)

== See also ==
Related lists

- List of aircraft engines
