= Vereker Monteith Hamilton =

British painter (1856–1931)

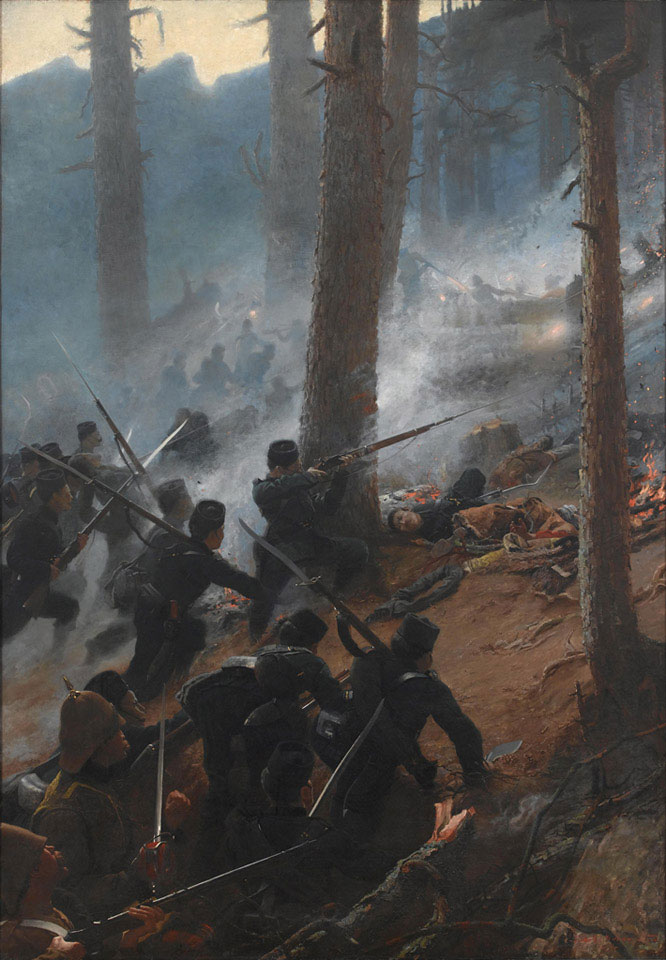
The attack on the Peiwar Kotal, Afghanistan, by 5th Gurkha Rifles, December 1878, c. 1890

Vereker Monteith Hamilton (14 February 1856 – 1931) was a British painter who specialised in military art.

He was born in Hafton, Argyll a son of Lieut. Col. Christian Monteith Hamilton of the 92nd Highlanders, and brother of British general Sir Ian Standish Monteith Hamilton. His mother Corinna Vereker, daughter of John Vereker, 3rd Viscount Gort, died when he was born. He followed his brother to Wellington College in 1871–73, and was destined for the army, and travelled to Dresden in 1873 to spend time with Colonel Drammers. However, he chose a career in art instead, following several years in Ceylon from 1873 to 1883 where he grew coffee. He studied art under Alphonse Legros at the Slade School where he won a prize in 1886 for landscape painting. He exhibited at the Royal Academy from 1886 onwards and at the Paris Salon, Glasgow and at the Grosvenor Gallery. He travelled to India in 1886 and spent a good deal of time there visiting Simla and Kashmir. In late 1893 he was living in Kilberry, Tarbert, Argyllshire.

Hamilton's military works focused primarily on contemporary events such as Piper Findlater at Dargai and the Tirah campaigns. He exhibited two paintings of the latter campaign entitled Missing and Afridis. His painting of Peiwar Kotal was inspired by a conversation with Lord Roberts who encouraged Hamilton to paint the scene. Another picture from the Second Afghan War depicted The 92nd at Kandahar, but he considered it a "shocking bit of work", and after its exhibition at the Royal Academy, repainted it with a number of new figures; it was exhibited again under its new title Macpherson's Brigade at Kandahar. In 1899, he returned to the subject with his Royal Academy piece Sniping the rear guard. During the First World War, Hamilton was a conscientious objector served with the British Red Cross.

He married Miss Lilian Swainson, granddaughter of ornithologist William Swainson, and died at Cowden, Kent in 1931 aged 76. He had three children; Ian, Marjorie (who married Felix Warre) and Janet (who married diplomat Alexander Wigram Allen Leeper, son of the educationist Alexander Leeper and grandson of Sir George Wigram Allen). Hamilton published an autobiography in 1925 entitled Things that Happened.

== Paintings ==
- A Forlorn Hope: Peninsula 1810 (1896) (South African National Gallery, Cape Town)
- The attack on the Peiwar Kotal (1891 (National Army Museum)
- An Ambuscade: an incident of the last Afghan campaign (1893) (Gordon Highlanders)
- After the attack on Sherpur (1893)
- A Shot at Daybreak: Kashmir (1894)
- The Forlorn Hope at Badajoz
- The Storming of the Kashmir Gate at Delhi (Private collection)
- Study for 'The Storming of the Kashmir Gate, Delhi' (Bugler Hawthorne) (Wellington College, Berkshire)
- Macpherson's Brigade assaulting Pir Paimal &c. (Royal Regiment of Scotland, Gordon Highlanders)
- Sniping the rear guard (North-West Frontier) (1897)
- Quatre Bras (1897) (Museum of New Zealand Te Papa Tongarewa)
- Piper Findlater at Dargai (1898 – Gordon Highlanders Museum, Aberdeen)
- The Airship flown by Captain Neville Usborne, R.N. (Imperial War Museum)
