= Peiwar Pass =

Mountain pass on the Afghanistan–Pakistan border

- Kurram Pass
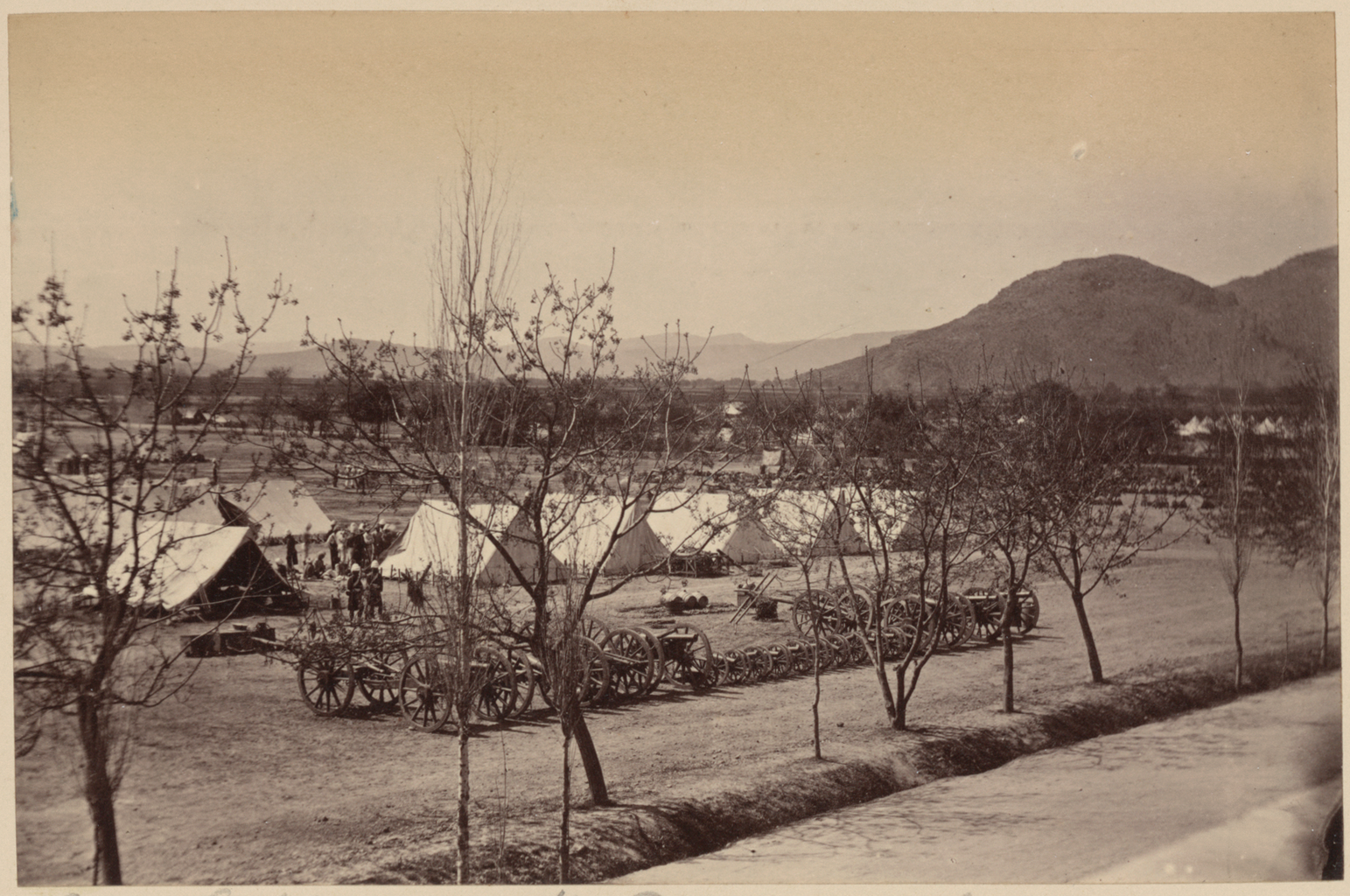
- "Guns captured at the Peiwar Kotal and parked at Kohat" photograph by John Burke (photographer) during the Second Anglo-Afghan War

- Location within Afghanistan Location within Khyber Pakhtunkhwa Location within FATA Location within Pakistan
- Interactive map of Peiwar Pass

Third Approach
- Location: Afghanistan–Pakistan border
- Range: Hindu Kush
- Coordinates: 33°58′09″N 69°52′21″E

The Peiwar Kotal Pass, also spelled Paywar, is a mountain pass in the Kurram Valley that connects Paktia Province in Afghanistan to Kurram District in the Khyber Pakhtunkhwa province of Pakistan. It is also known as Kurram Pass.

In November 1878, during the Second Anglo-Afghan War, Peiwar Kotal was the site of a battle between British-led forces under Sir Frederick Roberts and Afghan forces. Roberts outmaneuvered the Afghans and secured a British victory and control of the pass.

== See also ==
- Battles of the Second Anglo-Afghan War
- Battle of Peiwar Kotal
- Kurram Valley
- Loya Paktia
- Parachinar
