= HMS Liffey (1856) =

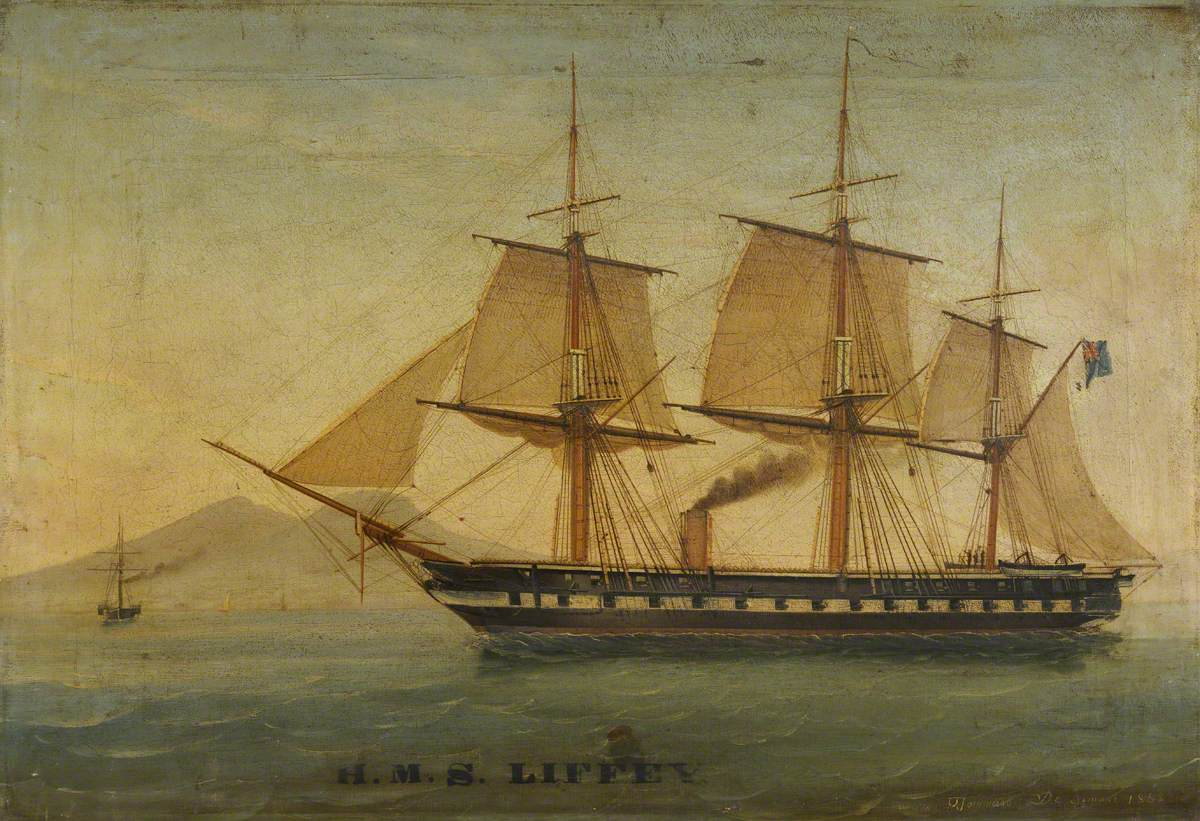

History

United Kingdom
- Name: HMS Liffey
- Ordered: 19 February 1844
- Cost: £135,774
- Launched: 6 May 1856, Devonport
- Commissioned: 1 November 1858
- Decommissioned: 17 March 1903 (paid off as store ship)
- Fate: Sold April 1903 at Coquimbo, broken up 1937

General characteristics
- Class & type: Liffey class frigate
- Displacement: 3,915 tons
- Tons burthen: 2,667 bm
- Length: 285 ft (87 m) (length overall); 235 ft 0 in (71.63 m) (gundeck); 203 ft 10 in (62.13 m) (keel)
- Beam: 50 ft 1.5 in (15.278 m)
- Draught: 13 ft 7 in (4.14 m)
- Depth of hold: 18 ft 4.5 in (5.601 m)
- Installed power: 600 nominal horsepower; 1,905 ihp (1,421 kW)
- Propulsion: 2-cyl. trunked horizontal single expansion; Single screw
- Sail plan: Full-rigged ship
- Speed: 11.1 kn (20.6 km/h) under steam
- Complement: 560
- Armament: 1858: Main deck: 30 × 8-inch (65 cwt) Smoothbore muzzle-loading shell; Upper deck: 20 × 32-pounder (56 cwt) Smoothbore muzzle-loading; 1 × 68-pounder gun (65 cwt) Smoothbore muzzle-loading on pivot; By 1870: Main deck: 4 × 7-inch 6 1/2-ton muzzle-loading rifles; 20 × 8-inch (65 cwt) smoothbore muzzle-loading shell; Upper deck: 6 × 64-pounder muzzle-loading rifles; Boat and field: 2 × 12-pounder Armstrong rifled breech-loading boat guns; 1 × 9-pounder Armstrong rifled breech-loading boat gun; 1 × 12-pounder Armstrong field gun; 1 × old brass practice gun; 1878 reduced to: 6 × upper deck guns

HMS Liffey was the name ship of five Liffey class of 51-gun wooden screw frigates of the Royal Navy. She was launched on 6 May 1856, at Devonport Dockyard, Plymouth.

== Design and description ==
Originally ordered on 19 February 1844 as a Constance class 50-gun sailing frigate to a 2,126bm Sir William Symonds design. She was reordered on 4 April 1851 as a screw frigate to the Surveyor's Department design.

Her John Penn and Sons engines were especially well regarded, featuring a shut off valve to prevent steam loss in case of damage. She was fitted with a 18 ft (5.5 m) diameter two-bladed Griffiths' propeller and bunkers for 342 tons of coal.

== Construction and service ==
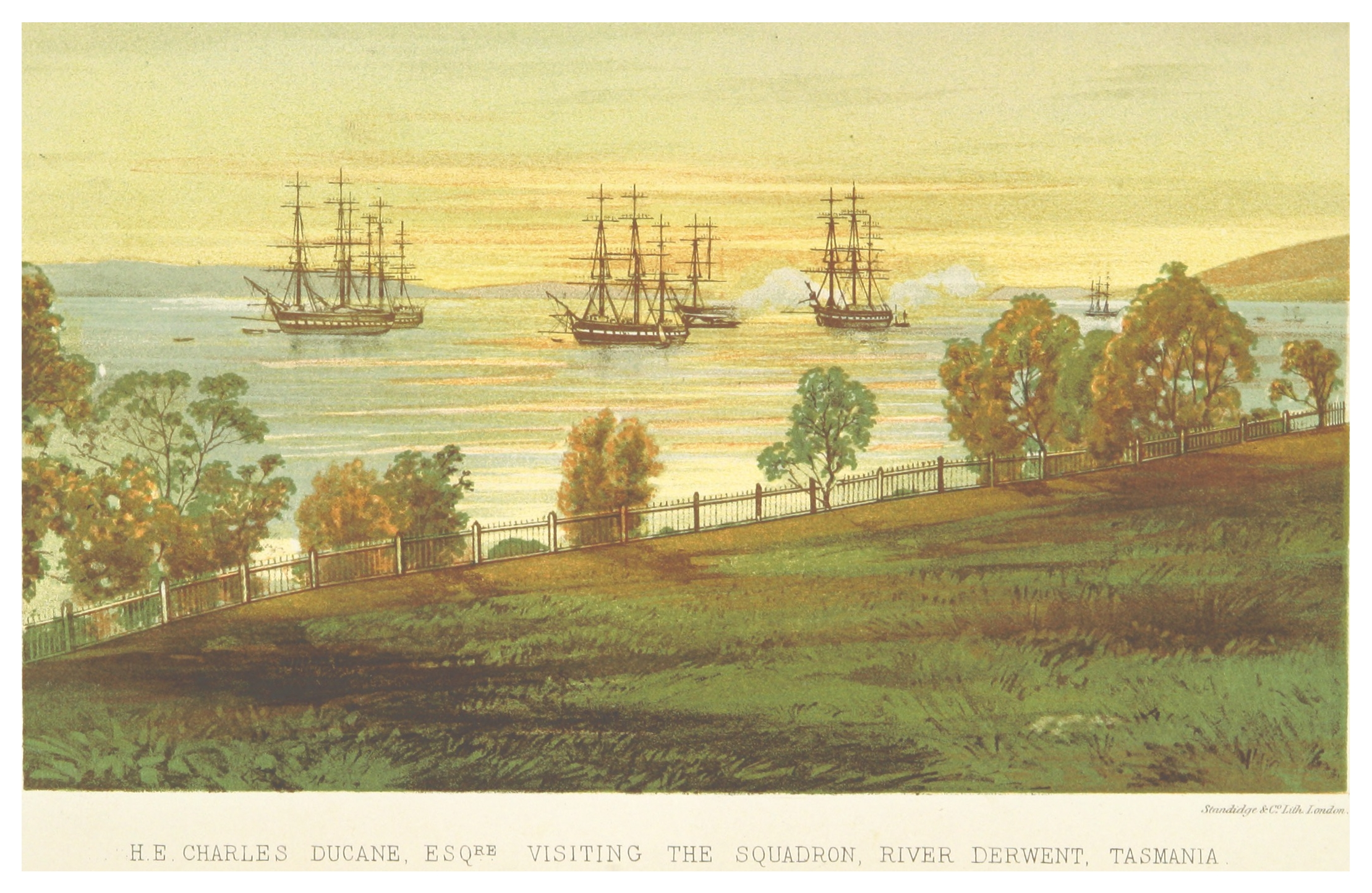
The Liffey and other frigates of the 1869–70 Flying Squadron on the River Derwent, Tasmania

The ship was laid down at Devonport Dockyard on 12 July 1854 and launched 6 May 1856. Liffey was commissioned in November 1858 at Portsmouth for the Channel Squadron. In May 1868 she escorted the Prince and Princess of Wales (the later Edward VII and Queen Alexandra) to Denmark.

By the time she was part of the 1869–70 Flying Squadron the ship was also fitted with a "Keyham's Donkey" for pumping seawater to and from the boilers, to fight fires and flooding, and could also be fitted to the engines of her steam launch. She joined the squadron at Madeira on 18 June 1869, completing a world cruise and arriving back at Plymouth Sound on 15 November 1870.

On 26 March 1877 she went into Devonport to be fitted out as a store ship for the Pacific Station, emerging on 23 March 1878 and costing £20,802. She had her machinery removed, spars and rigging reduced, ballasted with coal and only a few guns left on the upper deck. On passage to Madeira on 16 June 1878 she saved the crew of a burning German barque the Anita of Hamburg. After six weeks in the port of Valporaiso she sailed for Coquimbo, Chile, in company with the new iron frigate Shah and Pacific Station flagship ironclad Triumph, unsurprisingly losing in a sailing race against the Shah after losing a man overboard who was retrieved after being set upon by an albatross.

Liffey recommissioned at Coquimbo, on 17 November 1878, replacing the old store ship Nereus. Here her crew played football with foreign sailors, a sport otherwise unknown in Chile, the practice leading to the formation of the first Chilean football club Coquimbo Unido in 1894. She remained a harbour ship for the rest of career. In November 1902 the Admiralty decided they no longer needed a store ship at the south of the Pacific Station, and she was sold there as a hulk in April 1903, her guns transferred to another British ship.

Acquired by the English nitrate company Buchanan, Jones & Cia., she was towed to Mejillones in 1906. Liffey was sold again 1924 to MacAuliffee Shipping Co. to serve as a chata for coal, stores and accommodation for English employees. She served until 1937 when she was broken up for her teak timber. Her ship's wheel was saved and taken to Santiago, where in 1975 it existed as a garden feature on the Avenida Lyon. The Museo Marítimo Nacional preserves part of the cannons that she carried as ballast, and in 2013 it received as a donation the head of her figurehead.

In 2017 it was reported that her sunken remains had been found in the bay of Mejillones by divers working with the Museo de Mejillones. The keel, and parts of her frames, stern and stem were found.
