= Battle of Peiwar Kotal =

1878 battle of the Second Anglo-Afghan War

- Part of Second Anglo-Afghan War
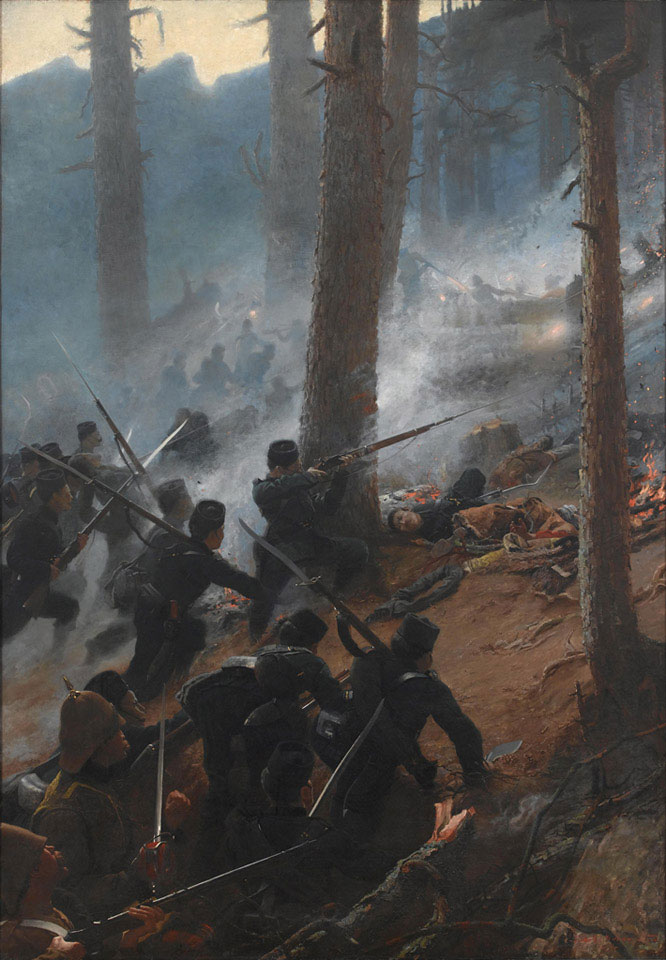
- The attack on the Peiwar Kotal, Afghanistan, by 5th Gurkha Rifles, December 1878; Vereker Monteith Hamilton, c. 1890
Date	2 December 1878
Location	Kurram Valley, Afghanistan
Result	British victory

Belligerents
British Empire: (British Raj) India	(Emirate of Afghanistan) Afghanistan

Commanders and leaders
Major General Frederick Roberts	Karim Khan

Strength
73 officers, 3,058 men 13 guns	4,000–5,000; 25 guns

Casualties and losses
21 killed 72 wounded	200 killed or wounded

The Battle of Peiwar Kotal was fought on 2 December 1878 between British forces under Major General Frederick Roberts and Afghan forces under Karim Khan, during the opening stages of the Second Anglo-Afghan War. The British were victorious, and seized the strategic Peiwar Kotal Pass leading into the interior of Afghanistan.

== The battle ==
After the outbreak of the Second Afghan War in November 1878, British-led forces invaded Afghanistan in three separate columns, the smallest of which was commanded by Major General Roberts. This column entered Afghanistan via the Kurram Valley on 21 November 1878, heading towards Kabul. The pass was however heavily defended at the Peiwar Kotal. This included Afghan regular forces, reinforced by local tribesman, who had established themselves in a strongly fortified position on a mountain overlooking the pass, which Robert described as an 'apparently impregnable position'.

Roberts halted and camped just outside Afghan artillery range for several days, sending out reconnaissance parties before deciding on his response. Finally, on 1 December, he ordered preparations for a frontal attack, including marking out artillery emplacements directly facing the main Afghan position. This was however a feint, and that night Roberts led the main body of his force around the flank of the Afghan defences. His attack on the morning of 2 December took the Afghans by surprise. After Roberts' forces, led by the Highlanders and Gurkhas, took a number of strongly held positions, the Afghans realised the threat to their line of retreat and retreated from the battlefield.

=== Aftermath ===
This victory, against a well positioned superior force, opened the route to Kabul and helped lead to the Afghan government suing for peace and accepting a British Resident in Kabul, the first phase of the war ending on 26 May 1879. It also brought General Roberts, until then a little known staff officer, into public prominence, both in Britain and the wider Empire.

Captain John Cook was awarded the Victoria Cross for his role in the battle, while his regiment, the 5th Gurkha Rifles, was awarded its first battle honour.

At least 16 cannon were captured from the Afghans. These were photographed by John Burke, who accompanied British forces.

== Order of battle ==
The following regiments participated in the battle:

=== British Regiments ===
- 2nd battalion, 8th King's Regiment
- 72nd Highlanders (half-battalion)

=== Indian Regiments ===
- 12th Bengal Cavalry
- 2nd Punjab Infantry, Punjab Frontier Force
- 5th Punjab Infantry
- 23rd Bengal Native Infantry (Punjab Pioneers)
- 29th Bengal Native Infantry (Punjabis)
- 5th Gurkha Rifles
- 21st (Kohat) Mountain Battery (Frontier Force)
- 22nd (Derajat) Mountain Battery (Frontier Force)

Thirty-eight members of the 10th Hussars were also present.

Prior to the battle, the total strength of the British force in camp was 889 Europeans, including officers, and 2,415 native Indians.

== Sources ==
- Farwell, Byron (1973). Queen Victoria's Little Wars. London: Allen Lane. ISBN 0713904577.
- Joslin; Litherland; Simpkin (1988). British Battles and Medals. London: Spink & Son. ISBN 0-907605-25-7.
- Richards, D.S. (1990). The Savage Frontier, A History of the Anglo-Afghan Wars. London: Pan MacMillan. ISBN 0-330-42052-6.
- Roberts, Frederick (1879). General Robert's dispatch for the Battle of Peiwar Kotal. London: London Gazette, 4 February 1879.
- Roberts, Sir Frederick (1897). Forty-one Years in India. London: Macmillan & Co.
- Robson, Brian (2007). The Road to Kabul: The Second Afghan War 1878–1881. Stroud: Spellmount. ISBN 978-1-86227-416-7.
