= Kruger telegram =

1896 telegram by Kaiser Wilhelm II to president Paul Kruger

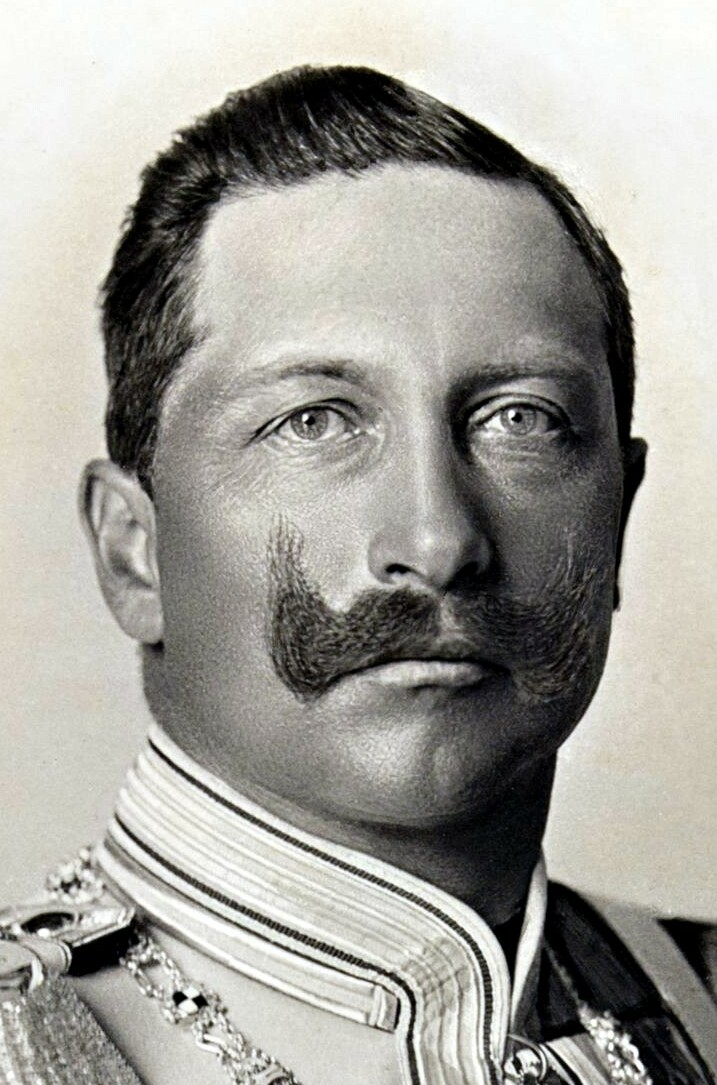
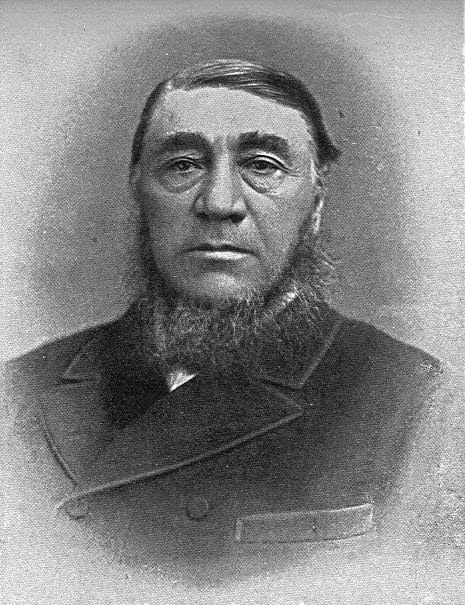
Wilhelm II and Paul Kruger, the sender and recipient of the telegram, respectively.

The Kruger telegram was a message sent by Kaiser Wilhelm II to Paul Kruger, president of the South African Republic, on 3 January 1896. It congratulated Kruger on repelling the Jameson Raid, a botched raid against the Republic carried out by British colonial administrator Leander Starr Jameson. The raid, conducted by 600 men from the Cape Colony, was intended to trigger a rebellion against the Republic by British migrant workers, but resulted in a fiasco when the raiders were defeated by the Republic's forces. The telegram caused huge indignation in the United Kingdom, and led to a deterioration in Anglo-German relations.

== The telegram ==
On receiving news of the Jameson Raid on 31 December 1895, the Kaiser reacted furiously, approving decisions to order a landing party of 50 marines to proceed to Pretoria to protect the Germans there and to dispatch a cruiser to Delagoa Bay. At a meeting on 1 January 1896 his behaviour towards his own Minister of War was so violent that the latter had difficulty in restraining himself from "drawing swords" and doubted that the Kaiser was "entirely normal" mentally. On 2 January the Kaiser wrote to Tsar Nicholas II of Russia to pursue the idea of a continental league against Great Britain.

On 3 January the Kaiser met with leading military and government representatives and the Foreign Secretary Adolf Marschall von Bieberstein's idea of a telegram was agreed upon as a compromise on the Kaiser's more extreme proposals such as declaring the Transvaal a German protectorate and the dispatch of troops there. The wording of the telegram was toned down after the Chancellor threatened to resign and the final version read:

I express to you my sincere congratulations that you and your people, without appealing to the help of friendly powers, have succeeded, by your own energetic action against the armed bands which invaded your country as disturbers of the peace, in restoring peace and in maintaining the independence of the country against attack from without.

In his Memoirs, the Kaiser claimed that the Kruger telegram had been composed by Marschall. According to the Kaiser:

I objected to this and was supported by Admiral Hollmann. At first the Imperial Chancellor remained passive in the debate. In view of the fact that I knew how ignorant Freiherr Marschall and the Foreign Office were of English national psychology, I sought to make clear to Freiherr Marschall the consequences which such a step would have among the English; in this, likewise, Admiral Hollmann seconded me. But Marschall was not to be dissuaded.

Then, finally, the Imperial Chancellor took a hand. He re [...]

Then I tried again to dissuade the ministers from their project; but the Imperial Chancellor and Marschall insisted that I should sign, reiterating that they would be responsible for the consequences. It seemed to me that I ought not to refuse after their presentation of the case. I signed.

The Kaiser also asserted that there was a subsequent Russo-French proposal for war against England.

In February, 1900,... I received news by telegraph...that Russia and France had proposed to Germany to make a joint attack on England, now that she was involved elsewhere, and to cripple her sea traffic. I objected and ordered that the proposal should be declined. Since I assumed that Paris and St. Petersburg would present the matter at London in such a way as to make it appear that Berlin had made this proposal to both of them, I immediately telegraphed from Heligoland to Queen Victoria and to the Prince of Wales (Edward) the facts of the Russo-French proposal, and its refusal by me. The Queen answered expressing her hearty thanks, the Prince of Wales with an expression of astonishment.

== Reaction ==
The telegram was applauded by the conservative German press and criticised in the liberal papers due to the potential of conflict with Britain. It caused huge indignation in Great Britain and led to a further deterioration in relations between the two countries. The telegram was taken to mean that the Kaiser endorsed the Transvaal's independence in what was seen by the British as their sphere of influence, and the reference to "friendly powers" was interpreted by them as meaning that assistance would have been available from Germany if necessary and that such assistance might be available in the future.

The Times newspaper proclaimed that "England will concede nothing to menaces and will not lie down under insult." The windows of German shops were broken, and German sailors were attacked in London. The German diplomatic response was essentially conciliatory, with the Kaiser responding to a letter from Queen Victoria (his grandmother) with "Never was the Telegram intended as a step against England or your Government...."

== Bibliography ==
- Sontag, Raymond J. "The Cowes Interview and the Kruger Telegram," Political Science Quarterly (1925) 40#2 pp. 217–247 in JSTOR
