= William Hannam Henderson =

Royal Navy Admiral (1845–1931)

Admiral Sir William Hannam Henderson KBE
- Born: 20 June 1845; Worth, Kent, England
- Died: 29 April 1931 (aged 85)
- Military career
- Allegiance: United Kingdom
- Branch: Royal Navy
- Service years: 1859–1908
- Rank: Admiral
- Nickname: "Busy William"
- Commands: HMS Conquest; HMS Arethusa; HMS Mersey; HMS Edgar; Captain of the Fleet Reserve, Devonport; Commodore, Jamaica; Admiral Superintendent, Devonport
- Awards: Knight Commander of the Order of the British Empire; East and West Africa Medal with "Vitu" clasp Mention in dispatches
- Other work: Editor of The Naval Review

Admiral Sir William Hannam Henderson, KBE (20 June 1845 – 29 April 1931) was a British flag officer of the Royal Navy, and the first editor of The Naval Review.

== Family background ==
Henderson was born in the coastal village of Worth in Kent, the eldest of four sons born to John Henderson and Laura Catherine (née Hannam). His three brothers also served in the Navy; Reginald Friend Hannam Henderson became an Admiral, Frank Hannam Henderson a Vice-Admiral, and John Hannam Henderson, retired as a Commander. (John's son Sir Reginald G. H. Henderson also became an Admiral.)

== Naval career ==
Henderson entered the Navy in 1859, aged 14, as a cadet aboard Britannia. From 1860 to 1864 he served aboard the 90-gun second rate ship of the line Nile, flagship of Rear Admiral Sir Alexander Milne, and also the steam sloop Styx, on the North America and West Indies Station, receiving promotion to sub-lieutenant in 1864. He then served aboard Prince Consort in the Channel Squadron. He was promoted to lieutenant on 11 September 1866, and served aboard the troopship Crocodile at Portsmouth from 1867, until taking part in the voyage around the world of the Flying Squadron in 1869–1870, serving aboard Liverpool, flagship of Rear Admiral Sir Geoffrey Hornby.

From 1872 to 1875 Henderson served aboard the screw sloop Peterel on the Pacific Station, then the sloop Eclipse on the North America and West Indies Station in 1877, and was on 'particular service' aboard the breastwork monitor Hydra in 1878. He was promoted to commander on 1 January 1880, with seniority from 31 December 1879, and served aboard the armoured cruiser Nelson, flagship of Commodore Sir James Erskine, on the Australia Station from 1881 to 1885.

On 1 January 1886 he was promoted to captain, and was sent to study at the Royal Naval College, Greenwich, where he was appalled to discover that apart from a few lectures on international law and naval history, studies were confined purely to technical matters, resulting in a total lack of knowledge of, and preparation for, war. He wrote a strongly worded letter, which he took personally to the Admiralty, and was permitted to read it to the Sea Lords in which he urged that naval officers should be instructed in naval history, strategy and tactics. Only Lord Charles Beresford was in any way interested in Henderson's ideas, which in the end came to nothing. In May 1888 Henderson received a letter from Admiral Alfred Thayer Mahan, commenting on Henderson's remarks on a paper by Rear-Admiral Colomb on the naval defences of the United Kingdom. The two men became regular correspondents thereafter, but did not meet in person for several years.

Undeterred by lack of official support, Henderson became a firm believer in value of a free debate, despite having taken part in a discussion on a paper by Sir Edward Reed at the United Service Institute, in which he criticised the Beagle-class sloops. A few days later Henderson allegedly received a message from the First Naval Lord stating that his remarks had harmed his prospects of obtaining a command. Again, when commanding Edgar in the Mediterranean, he attempted to initiate a discussion on the strategy of possible operations in the event of war, which was attended by the Commander-in-Chief, who brought the debate to an abrupt halt by saying, "Well, gentlemen, you may be sure that when war comes the Commander-in-Chief will know how to act and to make all necessary arrangements. Good morning."

Henderson returned to sea in 1889, commanding the screw corvette Conquest until 1892, and seeing action serving in the Naval Brigade under Admiral Sir Edmund Fremantle, Commander-in-Chief of the East Indies Station, in the punitive expedition against the Sultan of Vitu in East Africa in October 1890. For this service he was mentioned in dispatches and received the East and West Africa Medal with "Vitu" clasp. He subsequently commanded the second class cruisers Arethusa and Mersey, then the first class protected cruiser Edgar, on the Mediterranean and later China Stations from 1894 to 1896.

He returned to England to serve as the Captain of the Fleet Reserve at Devonport in 1896–1897, flying his flag in Devastation and Nile successively. From 1898 he served as commodore and naval officer-in-command at Jamaica, receiving promotion to rear admiral on 20 November 1899. He remained in Jamaica after the end of his appointment, being appointed a Member of the Privy Council and the Legislative Council on 28 March 1900.

Henderson then returned to England to serve as Admiral Superintendent of Devonport Dockyard from 1902 until 1906, receiving promotion to vice admiral on 28 November 1904.

On 22 August 1906 Henderson was appointed a member of a Royal Commission, led by Gerald William Balfour, alongside Frank Forbes Adam and Ivor John Caradoc Herbert, and with Charles Clive Bigham as Secretary, to inquire into management of navigational aids of the coast of the United Kingdom by the three General Lighthouse Authorities, and into the workings of these Authorities, and to report what changes, if any, were desirable.

On 30 June 1908 Henderson was promoted to admiral, but was placed on the Retired List at his own request, two days later, on 2 July.

== Post-naval career ==
In retirement Henderson served as a member of the Metropolitan Asylums Board from 1909 to 1921. Known as an ardent advocate of the reform of naval education, in 1912 he was approached by a group of young officers who asked him to act as treasurer and secretary of a correspondence society, which the following year began to publish the journal The Naval Review, of which Henderson served as editor until 1931. On 24 March 1914 he was appointed to the board of the Royal Patriotic Fund Corporation. On 3 June 1924, in the King's Birthday Honours, Henderson was made a Knight Commander of the Order of the British Empire (Military Division).

Admiral Henderson died in April 1931, aged 85.

== Personal life ==
Henderson was married to Sarah MacCabe, of New South Wales, and they had one daughter.
