= HMS Thames (1885) =

British cruiser, 1885–1947

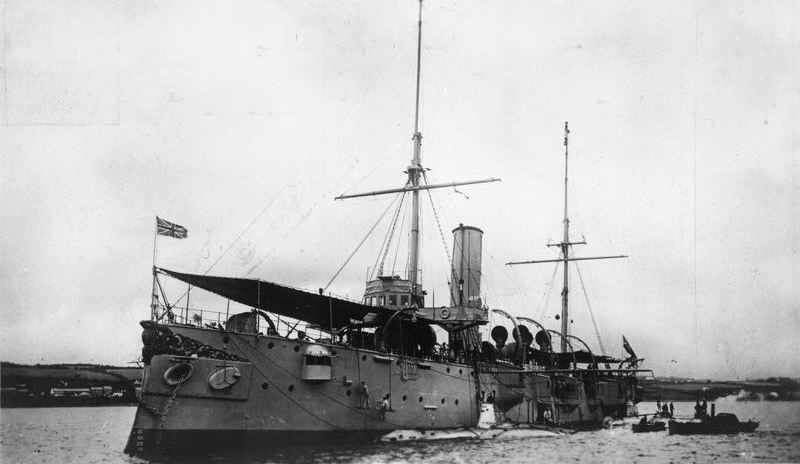
- Thames at anchor with what is probably an A-class submarine berthed next to her

History

United Kingdom
- Name: HMS Thames
- Namesake: River Thames
- Builder: Pembroke Dockyard
- Laid down: 14 April 1884
- Launched: 3 December 1885
- Completed: July 1888
- Reclassified: Submarine depot ship, 1903
- Fate: Sold, 13 November 1920

South Africa
- Name: SATS General Botha
- Namesake: Louis Botha
- Christened: 1 April 1922
- Acquired: 13 November 1920
- Commissioned: March 1922
- Decommissioned: 1942
- Renamed: Thames, 1942
- Reclassified: Training ship, 1922; Accommodation ship, 1942
- Home port: Simon's Town
- Fate: Scuttled, 13 May 1947

General characteristics
- Class & type: Mersey-class second-class cruiser
- Displacement: 4,050 long tons (4,110 t)
- Length: 300 ft (91.4 m) (p/p)
- Beam: 46 ft (14.0 m)
- Draught: 20 ft 2 in (6.1 m)
- Installed power: 6,000 ihp (4,500 kW); 12 × cylindrical boilers
- Propulsion: 2 × shafts; 2 × horizontal, direct-acting, compound-expansion steam engines
- Speed: 18 kn (33 km/h; 21 mph)
- Range: 8,750 nmi (16,200 km; 10,070 mi) at 10 knots (19 km/h; 12 mph)
- Complement: 300–50
- Armament: 2 × single BL 8 in (203 mm) guns; 10 × single BL 6 in (152 mm) guns; 3 × single QF 6-pounder (57 mm) Hotchkiss guns; 3 × single QF 3-pounder (47 mm) Hotchkiss guns; 2 × single 14 in (356 mm) torpedo tubes, 2 × 14 in torpedo launchers
- Armour: Deck: 2–3 in (51–76 mm); Conning tower: 9 in (229 mm)

HMS Thames was a Mersey-class protected cruiser built for the Royal Navy (RN) in the 1880s. The ship was placed in reserve upon her completion in 1888 and was converted into a submarine depot ship in 1903. She was sold out of the navy in 1920 and was purchased by a South African businessman to serve as a training ship for naval cadets under the name SATS General Botha. The ship arrived in South Africa in 1921 and began training her first class of cadets in Simon's Town the following year. General Botha continued to train cadets for the first several years of World War II, but the RN took over the ship in 1942 for use as an accommodation ship under her original name. She was scuttled by gunfire in 1947 and is now a diveable wreck.

== Design and description ==
The Mersey-class cruisers were improved versions of the Leander class with more armour and no sailing rig on a smaller displacement. Like their predecessors, they were intended to protect British shipping. The cruisers had a length between perpendiculars of 300 feet (91.4 m), a beam of 46 feet (14.0 m) and a draught of 20 feet 2 inches (6.1 m). They displaced 4,050 long tons (4,110 t). The ships were powered by a pair of two-cylinder horizontal, direct-acting, compound-expansion steam engines, each driving one shaft, which were designed to produce a total of 6,000 indicated horsepower (4,500 kW) and a maximum speed of 18 knots (33 km/h; 21 mph) using steam provided by a dozen cylindrical boilers with forced draught. The Mersey class carried enough coal to give them a range of 8,750 nautical miles (16,200 km; 10,070 mi) at a speed of 10 knots (19 km/h; 12 mph). The ships' complement was 300 to 350 officers and ratings.

Their main armament consisted of two breech-loading (BL) 8-inch (203 mm) guns, one each fore and aft on pivot mounts. Their secondary armament was ten BL 6-inch (152 mm) guns, five on each broadside in sponsons. Protection against torpedo boats was provided by three quick-firing (QF) 6-pounder Hotchkiss guns and three QF 3-pounder Hotchkiss guns. The ship was also armed with a pair of submerged 14-inch (356 mm) torpedo tubes and carried a pair of 14-inch torpedo carriages. The Mersey-class ships were protected by a lower armoured deck that was 2 inches (51 mm) on the flat and 3 inches (76 mm) on the slope. It sloped down at the bow to reinforce the ram. The armoured sides of the conning tower were 9 inches (229 mm) thick.

== Construction and career ==
Thames was the sixth ship of her name to serve in the Royal Navy. She was laid down on 14 April 1884 by Pembroke Dockyard in No. 4 slipway. The ship was launched on 3 December 1885 by the Hon. Mrs. Algernon Littleton and completed in July 1889 at a cost of £204,952. The ship went straight into reserve at Devonport after completion. On 21 March 1902 she was temporarily commissioned by Captain H. L. Fleet, with crewmen from the battleship HMS Empress of India, to serve as a port guard ship at Queenstown, while the latter ship was undergoing alterations. In 1903, the ship was converted to a submarine tender and served at Sheerness from 1907 to 1917 and then briefly at Portsmouth and Campbeltown, Scotland, before being paid off in 1919 at Chatham Dockyard.

=== South Africa ===
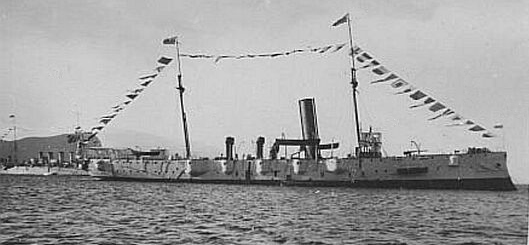
General Botha in 1925

She was sold for £8,000 in November 1920 to the Jersey-born South African entrepreneur T. B. Davis as a memory to his son who died during World War I. Later that month, the ship steamed to West India Dock, Tilbury, for a brief refit and Thames was renamed Training Ship (TS) General Botha, after Louis Botha, the first Prime Minister of the Union of South Africa. Before departing for Plymouth for extra crewmen on 6 January 1921, the ship was visited by Sir Reginald Blanckenberg, High Commissioner for South Africa, and his wife. She set sail from Plymouth on 18 January and ran into a heavy storm in the English Channel that smashed in the inadequately boarded-up sponsons and forced the ship to turn about for Plymouth for repairs where General Botha arrived two days later. The ship departed on 8 February and arrived in Cape Town on 26 March where she was greeted by the Minister of Defence, Colonel Hendrik Mentz and other notables.

Davis donated it to a trust on 9 May, with the stipulation that it be used exclusively for the nautical training of British and South African boys, so that they could subsequently serve in ships of the British Empire. The Admiralty agreed to cover the cost to convert General Botha into a training ship at Simon's Town Naval Dockyard and to tow her there from Cape Town in early September. It also agreed to grant the ship a mooring in Simon's Town. The first class of 75 boys reported aboard on 15 March 1922 on a two-year programme and the ship was formally christened as South African Training Ship (SATS) General Botha on 1 April by the wife of the Prime Minister, Jan Smuts. On 15 December, King George V agreed to become the ship's patron and sponsored an annual gold medal for the best cadet aboard. On 2 May 1925, Edward, Prince of Wales, inspected the boys and the ship. About a month later, she was docked to have her engines and funnel removed and her interior remodelled to create new messdecks, galleys and recreation spaces, returning to her moorings in August. In March 1935, Davis offered to sponsor a rowing competition between the cadets of General Botha and the British training ships, HMS Worcester, and HMS Conway in Britain and paid for their expenses to and from South Africa. King George V received the cadets in Buckingham Palace on 29 June shortly before the race during which they beat the cadets from Conway, but lost to Worcester. By the late 1930s, General Botha's guns and boilers had been removed and the former engine and boiler rooms converted into a gymnasium.

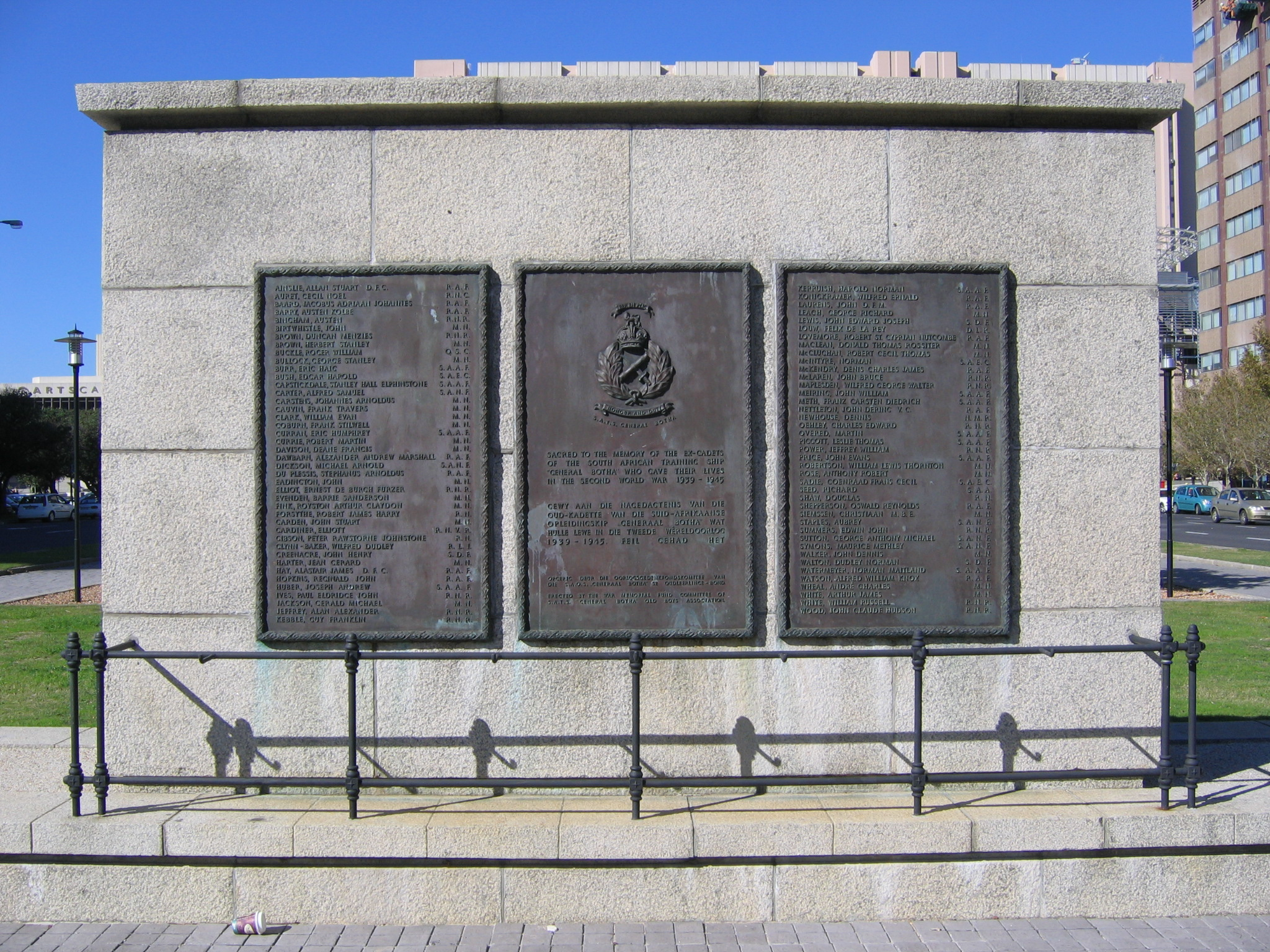
Memorial in Cape Town for SATS General Botha graduates who died during World War II

The trust's Board of Control offered the ship to the RN with 30 days notice on 7 September 1939, the day after South Africa declared war on Germany, but the offer was declined. Nevertheless, they decided to build accommodations for the cadets ashore if the RN did decide to take them up on their offer. The RN did so in July 1942 and the boys and staff went ashore on the 28th and the ship resumed her former name shortly afterwards. She served as an accommodation ship and was used as a prison ship for at least part of her time in RN service. By the time that the RN returned her to the Board of Control, the ship was deemed uneconomical to repair and she was scuttled by gunfire from one of the local coast defence battery on 13 May 1947 in False Bay at coordinates 34°13′48″S 18°37′48″E.

There exists an alumni association for those who served aboard General Botha, which has the Duke of Edinburgh as her patron. The South African Naval Museum in Simon's Town has an exhibit dedicated to the ship.

== See also ==
- Sailor Malan
- Shipwrecks of Cape Town
