= AVML =

AVML may refer to:

- Alan Villiers Memorial Lecture, a lecture series on naval history
- Alta Via dei Monti Liguri, a hiking trail in Liguria, Italy
- International Air Transport Association code for Asian Vegetarian Meal
