= Alexander Bethell =

Royal Navy Admiral (1855–1932)

Admiral Sir Alexander Bethell GCMG KCB
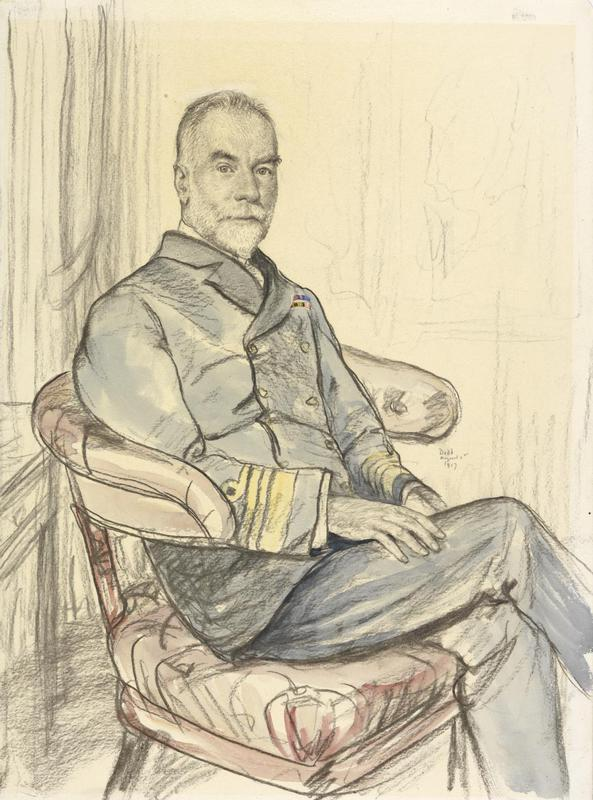
- 1917 portrait by Francis Dodd
- Born: 28 August 1855; London, England
- Died: 13 June 1932 (aged 76); London, England
- Relatives: Richard Bethell, 3rd Baron Westbury, brother
- Military career
- Allegiance: United Kingdom
- Branch: Royal Navy
- Service years: 1869–1918
- Rank: Admiral
- Commands: HMS Arethusa; HMS Naiad; HMS Hindustan; East Indies Station; Royal Naval College, Greenwich; Plymouth Command; Coastguards and Reserves
- Conflicts: World War I
- Awards: Knight Grand Cross of the Order of St Michael and St George; Knight Commander of the Order of the Bath

Admiral Sir Alexander Edward Bethell GCMG KCB (28 August 1855 – 13 June 1932) was a British naval officer who served as Commander-in-Chief, Plymouth of the Royal Navy.

== Naval career ==
Born the second son of Richard Augustus Bethell, 2nd Baron Westbury, Bethell joined the Royal Navy in 1869. In July–August 1899 he commanded the Arethusa, which was commissioned for the annual manoeuvres.

He was in March 1901 given command of the cruiser HMS Naiad serving in the Mediterranean Fleet, then took her to South Africa during the Second Boer War (service from April-Nov. 1901) and 117 of her crew of 234 served in Naval Brigades ashore, in the Cape Colony. The following year Naiad visited Alexandria and Port Said en route for Aden in late October 1902, landed the Somaliland Field Force in East Africa, and Bethell served for a time as senior naval officer at Obbia, Sultanate of Hobyo (in today's Somalia) until early 1903.

In April 1903 he returned to the United Kingdom to become assistant director of torpedoes, a role he kept until December 1906. He was given command of the battleship HMS Hindustan in 1908. He was appointed Director of Naval Intelligence in 1909.

In that capacity he attended the famous CID meeting on 23 August, at which the government rejected the Royal Navy's proposal that 5 divisions guard Britain whilst one land on the Baltic coast in the event of war with Germany. Instead the Army's plan, to send an Expeditionary Force of between four and six divisions to France, was adopted. He was appointed Commander-in-Chief, East Indies Station in 1912. He was appointed Officer Commanding the Royal Navy War College at Portsmouth in 1913.

He served in World War I as Commander, Battleships for the 3rd Fleet. He was President of the Royal Naval College, Greenwich, from 1914 to 1915 and was appointed Commander-in-Chief, Plymouth, in 1916 and Admiral commanding the Coastguards and Reserves in 1918. He retired later that year.

He lived at Wadeford House in Combe St Nicholas in Somerset. He died in a London nursing home on 13 June 1932.

== Family ==
In 1890 he married Hilda Huntsman; they had two sons and a daughter. Both his sons were killed in World War I.

== Books ==
- Jeffery, Keith (2006). Field Marshal Sir Henry Wilson: A Political Soldier. Oxford University Press. ISBN 978-0-19-820358-2.

Military offices
Preceded by Edmond Slade	Director of Naval Intelligence; 1909–1912	Succeeded by Thomas Jackson
Preceded by Sir Edmond Slade	Commander-in-Chief, East Indies Station; 1912	Succeeded by Sir Richard Peirse
Preceded by Sir Frederic Fisher	President, Royal Naval College, Greenwich; 1914–1915	Succeeded by Sir Lewis Bayly
Preceded by Sir George Warrender	Commander-in-Chief, Plymouth; 1916–1918	Succeeded by Sir Cecil Thursby
