= Log series (Westminster Press) =

The 'log' series of books were a series of at least 40 books written by members of the crew of various Royal Navy ships about their service between 1900 and 1909. They were published by Westminster Press and 4 shillings each. The write up of the series at the back of the books say that only 'happy ships' were written up.

The following is a list of [most of the] books in the 'log' series:

- HMS Argonaut, China Station, 1900–1904.
- HMS Astraea, China Station, 1899–1903.
- HMS Arethusa, went Round the World, 1899–1903.
- HMS Amphion, Pacific Station, 1901–1904.
- HMS Archer, Australian Station, 1900–1904.
- HMS Archer & Karrakatta, Australian Station, 1900–1904.
- HMS Bonaventure, Pacific and China Stations, 1903–1906.
- HMS Bulwark, Flagship, Mediterranean Station, 1902–1905.
- HMS Carnarvon, Mediterranean Station, 1905–1907.
- HMS Cumberland, Mediterranean Station, 1904–1906.
- HMS Caesar, Mediterranean Station, 1900–1903.
- HMS Crescent, Cape Station, 1904–1907.
- HMS Diana, Mediterranean Station, 1904–1606
- HMS Eclipse, China Station, 1901–1904.
- HMS Fox, East Indies Station, 1901–1904.
- HMS Flora, Pacific Station, 1902–1905.
- HMS Glory, China Station, 1900–1904.
- HMS Grafton, Pacific Station, 1902–1905.
- HMS Goliath, China Station, 1900–1903.
- HMS Hyacinth, Flagship, East Indies Station, 1903–1906.
- HMS Implacable, Mediterranean Station, 1902–1905.
- HMS Karrakatta, Passage Home from Australia, 1904.
- HMS Lancaster, Mediterranean Station, 1904–1906.
- HMS Naiad, East Indies and Mediterranean Stations, 1901–1904.
- HMS Perseus, East Indies Station, 1901–1904.
- HMS Pandora, Mediterranean Station, 1901–1904.
- HMS Phaeton, Pacific Station, 1900–1903
- HMS Pelorus, Cape Station, 1904–1906.
- HMS Pelorus, Cape Station and Amazon journey. 1906–1909: Across a continent in a man-of-war: being the log of commission of HMS Pelorus 1906–1909 with a full account of her cruise of 2000 miles up the Amazon.
- HMS Russell, Mediterranean Station and Atlantic Fleet, 1906–1908.
- HMS Royal Arthur, Flagship, Australian Station, 1900–1904.
- HMS Retribution, North America and West Indies Stations, 1902–1904.
- HMS Ramillies, Mediterranean Station, 1900–1903.
- HMS Renown, Mediterranean Station and Voyage to India, 1900–1904.
- HMS Repulse, Mediterranean Station, 1902–1904.
- HMS Sutlej, China Station, 1904–1906.
- HMS Scylla, Newfoundland Fisheries, 1905–1906.
- HMS Talbot, China Station, containing an account of the Battle of Chemulpo Bay, as seen by the Ship’s Company, 1901–1904.
- HMS Victorious, Mediterranean Station, 1899–1903.
