= Leander-class cruiser (1882) =

1882 class of British protected cruisers

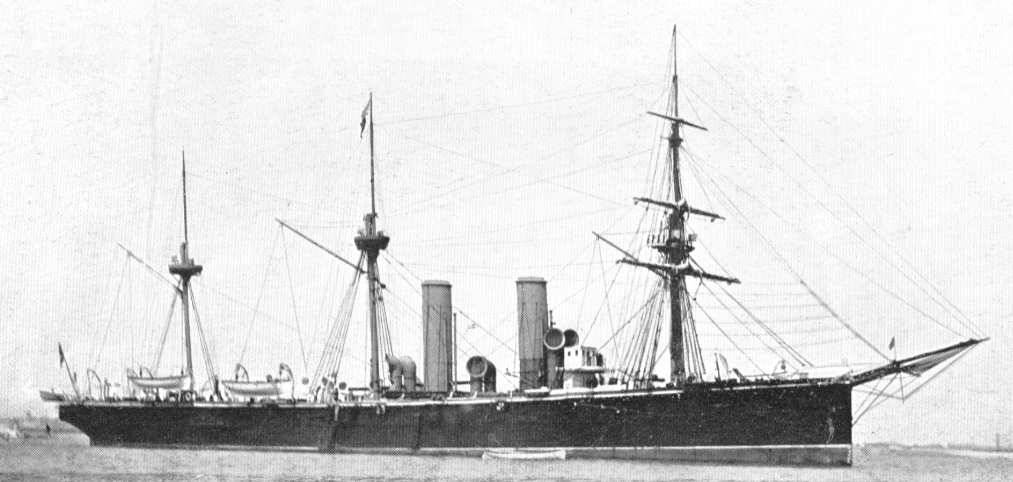
- HMS Leander in 1897

Class overview
- Name: Leander class
- Operators: Royal Navy
- Preceded by: Iris class
- Succeeded by: Mersey class
- Built: 1880 - 1887
- In commission: 1885 - 1919 (as seagoing warship)
- Planned: 4
- Completed: 4
- Scrapped: 4

General characteristics (HMS Leander)
- Class & type: Leander-class second-class partially protected cruiser
- Displacement: 4,300 tons (4,400 tonnes) load.
- Tons burthen: 3,750 tons (B.O.M.).
- Length: 300 ft (91.4 m) between perpendiculars.; 315 ft (96.0 m) overall.
- Beam: 46 ft (14 m).
- Draught: 20 ft 8 in (6.30 m) aft, 19 ft 6 in (5.94 m) forward; with 950 tons (970 tonnes) of coal and complete with stores and provisions.
- Propulsion: Sails and screw, two shafts, two-cylinder horizontal direct-acting compound engines, 12 cylindrical boilers, 5,500 IHP
- Speed: 16.5 kn (30.6 km/h) designed; 17–18 kn (31–33 km/h) after funnels raised
- Range: 11,000 nmi (20,000 km) at 10 kn (19 km/h).; 725 tons coal normal, 1000 tons maximum = c. 6,000 nmi at economical speed.
- Complement: (1885): 275
- Armament: (1885): 10 × 6-inch Breechloading guns; 8 1-inch Nordenfelt guns; 2 5-barrel and 2 2-barrel 0.45-in machineguns; 4 above water torpedo dischargers.
- Armour: 1.5 in (38 mm) steel armoured deck (with sloped sides) over 165 ft (50 m).; 1.5 in (40mm) gun shields.
- Notes: Carried 2 second class torpedo boats.; Carried 7-pdr and 9-pdr boat guns and field guns.

The Leander class was a four-ship cruiser programme ordered by the Admiralty in 1880. The class comprised HMS Leander, HMS Phaeton, HMS Amphion, and HMS Arethusa.

== Genesis ==
"A new and better policy of unarmoured construction was inaugurated by the Admiralty of 1874-80. They began by building the two despatch vessels, Mercury and Iris, with a speed not approached up to that date by any in naval service. In the Mercury and the Iris, the speed was obtained by an enormous development of horse-power… The cost per ton was equal to that of the most powerful ironclad, while the fighting power was inconsiderable."

In 1880, the Admiralty Board were divided about next design of cruising ship to lay down. The First Naval Lord, Sir Astley Cooper Key, favoured an enlarged 15 knots (28 km/h) Comus class. Some of the other members of the board preferred an improved Iris class. The First Lord of the Admiralty, William H. Smith, backed the latter. A change of government occurred on 23 April 1880; Lord Northbook replaced W.H. Smith as First Lord, though Astley Cooper Key continued as First Naval Lord. "Lord Northbook's board were deeply impressed with the necessity for developing the construction of vessel of the Leander" type. "The first four ships of a large class laid down for the protection of commerce under Lord Northbrook's board were of the Leander type. The Leanders have a displacement of 3,750 tons. Their speed is 17 knots… Their coal supply is 1016 tons. These ships were followed by the four ships of the Mersey type…"

The Leanders were primarily designed for trade protection. In 1881, it was argued that Britain had fallen behind in cruisers to protect Britain's mercantile marine, which at the time was at least half the world total. "Taking 14 knots as the standard of high speed, we have only 11 swift cruisers, counting the Iris and Mercury despatch vessels among them. Fine vessels they are, and no doubt the Shah and the Raleigh, when they have got on board their new armament, will give a good account—a very good account indeed—of any cruiser in the world that is not an iron-clad. But the world is a large place; and eight or ten vessels cannot be everywhere, and the safety of our commerce imperatively demands that the swift cruisers which we have ready at the outbreak of a war shall be enough to clear the seas of privateers. Much use, as a war goes on, may, no doubt, be made of the armed merchantmen on the Admiralty List; but we must have Royal [Navy] cruisers to begin with, A commencement was made last year by the late Board in the Leander and her two consorts, which, with their partially protected machinery, their great speed, and their excellent guns, will be everything that can be desired for the purpose for which they were devised. The present Board have carried this policy farther. We are pushing on the Leanders, and we have laid down a fourth Leander at Pembroke, to occupy the spare time of the 200 extra men who are working on the iron-clads…"

On 2 December 1884, the Secretary to the Admiralty stated, "The present Board have been gradually developing, and, as I would venture to say, in an effective manner, our resources for the protection of commerce. The late Board of Admiralty laid down an admirable type for the purpose in the Leander class. We have followed in their footsteps by producing the Mersey type, and we now propose to go a step further in the same direction, by laying down vessels of the Mersey class, but protected by a belt in lieu of an armoured deck. The belt will, I think, be approved by my hon. Friend who sits behind me (Sir Edward J. Reed)." These belted cruisers were the Orlando class.

== Design ==
Compared with the Iris class, the designers of the Leander "cut down top hamper and took advantage of the recent advance in gun construction to reduce the weight of, while adding to the efficiency of armaments. The models approved for the new ships were favourable to high speed."

=== Armament ===
"The armament consists of ten 6-inch breech-loading guns, two Gatling guns, ten Nordenfeld guns, four Gardner guns, and four tubes for launching Whitehead torpedoes. Four of the breech-loaders are fixed on revolving turntables which project beyond the sides of the ship. They are placed on either side of the upper deck at the fore end of the poop and after end of the forecastle. These bow guns can be trained from the cross fire of 4˚ forward to 45˚ abaft the beam, and the after guns from right aft fire to 45˚ before the beam. The remaining 6-inch breech-loading guns which these vessels carry are fitted at broadside ports in the ordinary way. The Nordenfeld guns are fitted in projecting parts of the topsides, and are so arranged as to give great training and great depression, firing into boats alongside. The Whitehead torpedoes are discharged from broadside ports on the lower deck, two forward and two aft."

When Leander was first commissioned in May 1885, her armament was listed as:

"Upper deck 10 6-in BL, 8 1-in Nordenfeld, 2 5-barrel and 2 2-barrel 0.45-in guns. 7-pdr and 9-pdr boats and field guns.
2 second class torpedo boats. 4 torpedo dischargers"

=== Protection and watertight subdivision ===
The Leanders relied for protection on subdivision, coal bunkers, and a one-and-a-half-inch (40 mm) armoured deck over 165 feet amidships. The armoured deck was just above the normal waterline at the centre, and sloped down at the sides to protect against shells entering at the waterline.

The 1886 edition of The Naval Annual described them as:

"The Phaeton [sic] class differs from the Iris in having a protecting deck. The vessels are built of steel. The distinctive feature of the class is that they are unarmoured cruisers, having the magazines and machinery protected by a steel deck 1½ in. thick, and sloped at the sides in order to deflect any shot striking the vessel near the water line. When the coal bunkers are filled, these too will afford some protection, as they are ranged along the sides and across the ends of what has been called the vital part of the ship... Provision has of course been made by watertight bulkheads and numerous compartments for keeping the ship afloat if struck by shot or otherwise injured in the hull. The Leander struck the Hornet Rock shortly after she was commissioned. The sea entered through numerous rivet holes where rivets had been sheared, but the compartment kept the ship afloat in a working condition."

=== Propulsion ===
"With regard to their steaming capabilities, it may be noted that these cruisers with an authorized complement of coal of 725 tons have room in their bunkers for 1000 tons. They also carry three masts, but are not expected to have much sailing power."

"The Phaëton has been tried in the Solent. At the previous six-hour' full power trial of the Phaëton there was a difficulty experienced in maintaining steam from want of draught in the stokeholds. (Only the Leander of this class has been fitted with fans for forced draught.) The funnels were afterwards raised from 60 ft (18 m) to 68 ft (21 m) (the same height as those of the first-class cruisers), while the space between the firebars was increased. The effect of these changes at the trial was very marked, the engines being provided with an abundance of steam without their being any necessity for resorting to the blast. The trial was intended to have been for six hours, but during the eleventh half-hour, the expansion gear of the starboard engine heated and snapped, and the run was brought to a premature close. As, however the machinery worked without any hitch of any kind, and was developing power largely in excess of the Admiralty contract, it was agreed by the officers superintending the trial to accept the means of the five hours as a sufficient test of performance. These afforded the following data: Steam in the boilers, 85.35 lbs [588.5 kPa]; vacuum, 25.3 in (640 mm) starboard and 24.8 in (630 mm) port; revolutions, 100; mean pressures, starboard, 43.7 and 11 lb. [301 kPa and 76 kPa] and 43 and 11.7 lb. [300 kPa and 81 kPa] port; collective horsepower, 5,574.88 ihp (4,157.19 kW) or nearly 600 horses [450 kW] beyond the contract. The mean speed registered by runs on the measured mile was 18.684 knots (34.603 km/h), which was remarkable, notwithstanding her light draught. The coal consumption did not exceed 2.39 lbs. per unit of power per hour [1.45 kg coal per hour per kiloWatt]."

Name	Indicated Horse Power (IHP)	Weight of Engines per IHP		Weight of Boilers (including water) per IHP		Total Weight of Machinery per IHP	
Name	Indicated Horse Power (IHP)	lb/IHP	kg/kW	lb/IHP	kg/kW	lb/IHP	kg/kW
Iris	7,330 ihp (5,470 kW)	136	83	173	105	309	188
Leander	5,500 ihp (4,100 kW)	139	85	196	119	335	204
Mersey	6,630 ihp (4,940 kW)	82 1/2	50	104	63	186½	113

=== Establishment of ship's company ===
When the Leander first commissioned her establishment of ship's company was listed as follows in her log. (Note the way that the engine room establishment officers are not listed with the officers.)

Type		Number
Officers		18
Petty officers		41
Seamen and other ratings		100
Boys		13
Marines		36
Engine-room establishment	officers	4
Engine-room establishment	P.O. and stokers	63
Total		275
Source: Log of HMS Leander 29 May 1885 – 22 May 1886. The order is as listed in the original.

In the 1888 British annual naval manoeuvres, "the proportion of untrained (2nd Class) stokers which were draughted to several of the ships appears to have been too large." The opinion of the captain of the Arethusa was that the "engine room complement [was] insufficient by 2 engine room artificers, 2 leading stokers, and 23 stokers."

The Navy List gave the following composition of officers for the Leander in December 1885 (order as in the original):

- 1 Captain
- 5 Lieutenants
- 1 Staff Surgeon
- 1 Staff Paymaster
- 1 Staff Engineer
- 1 Sub-Lieutenant
- 1 Assistant Paymaster
- 1 Engineer
- 2 Assistant Engineers
- 2 Gunners
- 4 Boatswains
- 1 Carpenter

Total 21 (including 4 engineers).

== Building programme ==
Name	Builder	Ordered	Laid Down	Launched	Financial Year of Completion	First Commissioned	Last in commission as seagoing warship	Fate
Leander	Napier, Glasgow.	1880	14 June 1880	28 October 1882	1885-86	29 May 1885	18 December 1919	Sold for breaking up 1920.
Phaeton	Napier, Glasgow.	1880	14 June 1880	27 February 1883	1885-86	20 April 1886	28 April 1903	Sold 1913, repurchased 1941, sold 1947.
Amphion	Pembroke Dockyard.	1881	25 April 1881	13 October 1883	1885-86	5 July 1887	25 May 1904	Sold 1906
Arethusa	Napier, Glasgow.	1880	14 June 1880	23 December 1882	1886-87	8 July 1887	3 April 1903	Sold 4 April 1905.

The financial year of completion is taken from the statement of the first cost of each effective ship of the Royal Navy under the year of completion in the Navy Estimates for 1889-90. It provides a different view of when the vessels were completed than the usually quoted reference books. Both the Amphion and Arethusa lay in ordinary reserve until commissioned for the 1887 annual manoeuvres, so the date when the vessels were first commissioned was some time after they were completed.

In March 1882, it was stated that "the Leander, the Arethusa, and the Phaeton will pass out of the hands of the contractors, and will come to our own yards to be completed and fitted with the new 6-inch breech-loader; and the Amphion, at Pembroke, will be pushed forward in the intervals of the iron-clad building." It was stated on 1 August 1882, that "the Amphion is being advanced satisfactorily at Pembroke, while the Leander, Arethusa, and Phaeton are promised to be delivered within the year by the contractor, a promise which was renewed within a few days of the present time." But seven months later, it was "noticed with regret" that the ships of the Leander class (and also some of the gun vessels) that were building by contract had not been completed as they ought to have been. The explanation was that there had been a large increase in the expenditure for wages at the Dockyards, and this had paid for by money voted for the construction of the Leanders. Though the "Admiralty have been desirous that the money should be spent on the object for which it is voted, but that it has been prevented by a delay with the contractor." In May 1883, it was "alleged that one of the reasons for the delay in the construction of the Leander is that the Admiralty have not fully decided upon the smaller arrangements which have to be carried out by the builders." However it was doubted that this was the main reason for delays. By May 1884, it was being "said that the Leander should be completed first; that then a trial of the Leander should be made; and that then it should be ascertained what improvements or alterations ought to be effected in the Arethusa, and the other ships of the same class. It is said that the other two are built and are almost complete..." This course of action was opposed by W.H. Smith who said "the Leander class ought to be rendered complete, according to the arrangements undertaken by the Board of Admiralty, without loss of time." On 15 July 1884, the Secretary to the Admiralty stated that "The Leander herself, we expect, will be completed in December in the Dockyards; but the others of her class will not be completed until she has been tried. Directly we are satisfied with her capabilities the others will be completed. They can be completed in about three months." As of 6 March 1885, "the Leander alone was completed." The Secretary to the Admiralty stated: "In 1885–6 we shall complete... [the remaining] three protected ships of the Leander class...". The veracity of Admiralty statistics on the completion of these vessels was questioned in the ensuing debate in the House of Commons by W.H. Smith. When the Leander was completed in 1885, she was considered one of the three most important unarmoured vessels in the 1885 Evolutionary Squadron.

== Costs ==
Name	Cost of Hull	Cost of Machinery	Cost of Armament	Total Cost to Completion	Cost after Completion (including sea stores) to 31 March 1888
Leander	£87,843	£60,610	£	£191,882 £8,526	£17,325 £4,324
Phaëton	£86,763	£58,435	£	£189,672 £8,337	£8,291 £3,139
Amphion	£95,000	£65,500	£	£202,113 £26,351	£5,926 £1,477
Arethusa	£86,763	£58,435	£	£191,138 £8,770	£5,259 £1,242
"Note: The figures in italics represent dockyard incidental charges apportioned to each ship."

At between £189,672 and £202,113 each, the Leanders were cheaper than the Iris and Mercury, whose costs to completion were £224,052 and £234,860 respectively. The Merseys, that followed them cost between £202,840 and £217,982 each.

== Performance as sea boats ==
The committee appointed to inquire into all circumstances connected with the 1888 British naval manoeuvres reported as follows:

With respect of the Arethusa, "...the Committee think it right to call special attention to certain remarks contained in the report of the captain who lately commanded this ship.
He considers the Arethusa a good sea-boat, and that she steams well against a moderate head sea and strong wind, but that she rolls heavily when the sea is abeam or abaft; she is therefore unsteady as a gun-platform under these conditions, and, on account of her quick and heavy rolling, 'accurate shooting would be an impossibility, and machine guns in the tops would be useless.'
Among the many suggestions made for improving her efficiency, the following refer especially to the reduction of top weight:-
- Removal of square rig on foremast.
- Removal of fighting tops.

The captain does not himself suggest that the armament should be lightened; but Admiral Baird's opinion, that all cruisers appear to be too heavily armed, applies to this vessel as well as to the Mersey class, and in this opinion the Committee concur.
Three other suggestions from the same officer are noted as specially worthy of consideration, viz.:-
- To enlarge the rudder.
- To extend the upper bridge out to the ship's side in order to obtain a view right aft.
- To fit a search light on the poop, as a torpedo-boat coming up astern cannot be kept in the beam of the ones on the fore-bridge."

The First Naval Lord, Admiral Sir Arthur Hood commented on this as follows:

"The proposal to remove the square rig on the foremast, and the fighting tops, in order to reduce top weight I do not concur in; the square rig on the foremast is a decided advantage to vessels of this class, and would enable them to save coal when cruising on a foreign station; the value of the guns mounted in the fighting tops would be considerable when engaged with cruisers, and therefore I would retain them."

== Comments on design with hindsight ==
"Leander and her three sisters were very successful and may be seen as the ancestors of most [Royal Navy] cruisers for the rest of the century and beyond. Their general configuration was scaled up to the big First Class cruisers and down to the torpedo cruisers, whilst traces of the protected deck scheme can even be recognised in some sloops."
