= HMS Phaeton (1883) =

Cruiser of the Royal Navy

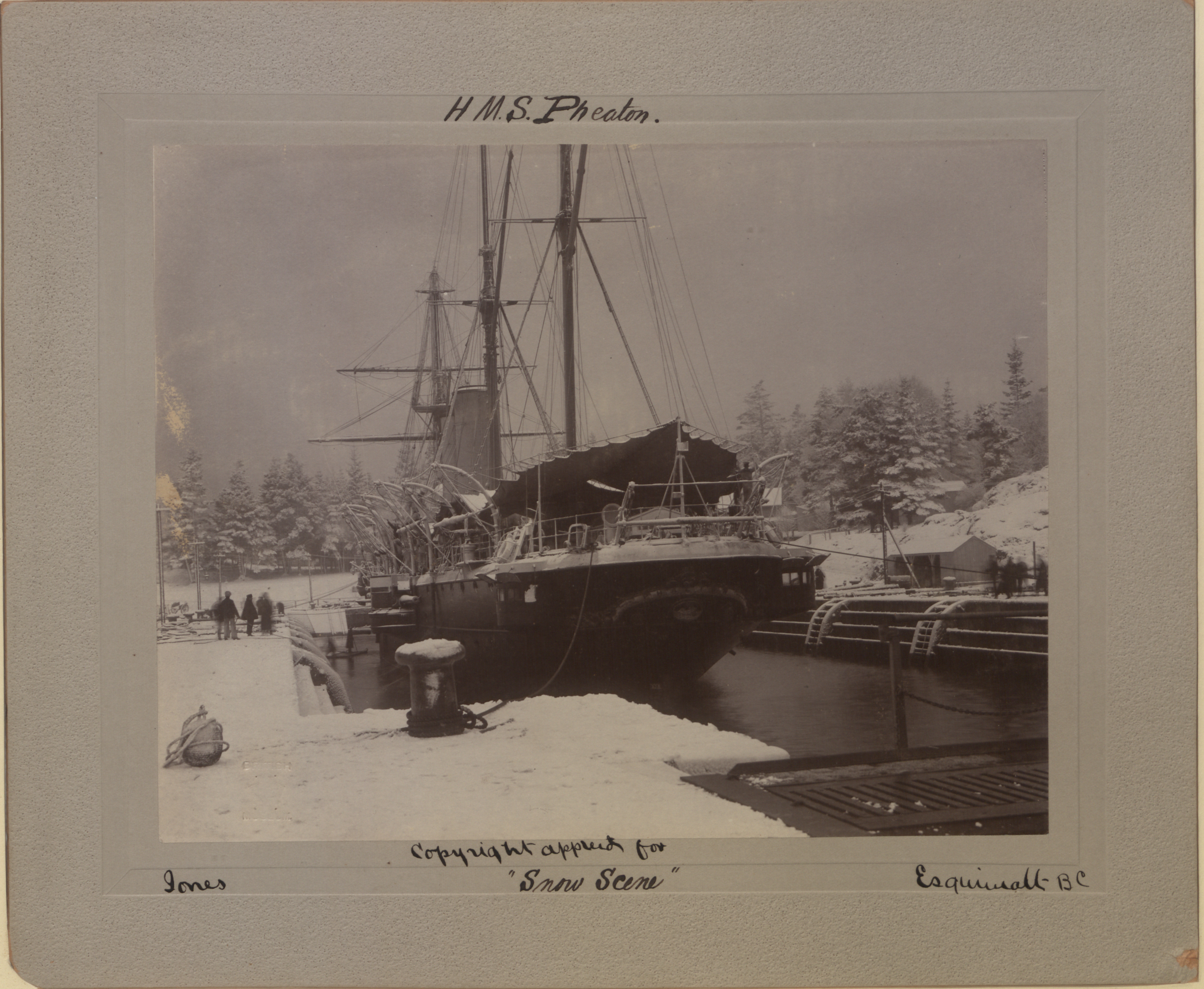
- Phaeton in harbour at Esquimalt, 1898

History

United Kingdom
- Name: HMS Phaeton
- Ordered: 1880
- Builder: Napier, Glasgow
- Laid down: 14 June 1880
- Launched: 27 February 1883
- Commissioned: 20 April 1886
- Decommissioned: 28 April 1903 (as sea-going warship)
- Out of service: 1913
- Renamed: TS Indefatigable 1913
- Reinstated: 1941 as Carrick II
- Fate: Sold for breaking up 1947

General characteristics
- Class & type: Leander-class protected cruiser
- Displacement: 4,300 tons (4,400 tonnes) load.
- Tons burthen: 3,750 tons (BOM)
- Length: 300 ft (91 m) pp; 315 ft (96 m) oa
- Beam: 46 ft (14 m)
- Draught: 20 ft 8 in (6.30 m) aft, 19 ft 6 in (5.94 m) forward; with 950 tons (970 tonnes) of coal and complete with stores and provisions.
- Propulsion: Sails and screw. Two shafts. Two cylinder horizontal direct acting compound engines, 12 cylindrical boilers, 5,500 ihp (4,100 kW)
- Speed: 16.5 knots (30.6 km/h; 19.0 mph) designed; 17–18 knots (31–33 km/h; 20–21 mph) after funnels raised
- Range: 11,000 nmi (20,000 km; 13,000 mi) at 10 knots (19 km/h; 12 mph).; 725 tons coal normal, 1000 tons maximum = c. 6,000 nmi at economical speed.
- Complement: (1885): 275
- Armament: (1885): 10 × 6-inch breech loading guns; 8 1-inch Nordenfelt guns; 2 5-barrel and 2 2-barrel 0.45-in machineguns; 4 above water torpedo dischargers.
- Armour: 1.5 in (40 mm) steel armoured deck (with sloped sides) over 165 ft.; 1.5 in (40 mm) gun shields.
- Notes: Carried 2 second class torpedo boats.; Carried 7 pdr and 9 pdr boat guns and field guns.

HMS Phaeton was a second class cruiser of the Leander class which served with the Royal Navy. Paid off in 1903, she then did harbour service until 1913 at Devonport, where she was used for training stokers and seamen. Sold in 1913 to a charitable institution that ran a training ship for boys based at Liverpool, she was renamed TS Indefatigable until repurchased by the Admiralty in 1941 and renamed Carrick II, whereupon she served as an accommodation hulk at Gourock throughout World War II. In 1946 she was sold to shipbreakers Thos. W. Ward in Preston and broken up in 1947.

== Construction ==
She was built by Napier in Glasgow, being laid down in 1880, launched in 1883 and completed in 1886.

== Acceptance Trials ==
"The Phaeton has been tried in the Solent. At the previous six hour' full power trial of the Phaeton there was a difficulty experienced in maintaining steam from want of draught in the stokeholds. (Only the Leander of this class has been fitted with fans for forced draught.) The funnels were afterwards raised from 60 ft (18 m) to 68 ft (21 m) (the same height as those of the first-class cruisers), while the space between the firebars was increased. The effect of these changes at the trial was very marked, the engines being provided with an abundance of steam without their being any necessity for resorting to the blast. The trial was intended to have been for six hours, but during the eleventh half hour, the expansion gear of the starboard engine heated and snapped, and the run was brought to a premature close. As, however the machinery worked without any hitch of any kind, and was developing power largely in excess of the Admiralty contract, it was agreed by the officers superintending the trial to accept the means of the five hours as a sufficient test of performance. These afforded the following data: Steam in the boilers, 85.35 lbs [588.5 kPa]; vacuum, 25.3 in (640 mm) starboard and 24.8 in (630 mm) port; revolutions, 100; mean pressures, starboard, 43.7 and 11 lb. [301 kPa and 76 kPa] and 43 and 11.7 lb. [300 kPa and 81 kPa] port; collective horsepower, 5,574.88 ihp (4,157.19 kW) or nearly 600 horses [450 kW] beyond the contract. The mean speed registered by runs on the measured mile was 18.684 knots (34.603 km/h), which was remarkable, notwithstanding her light draught. The coal consumption did not exceed 2.39 lbs. per unit of power per hour [1.45 kg coal per hour per kiloWatt]."

However, by September 1886, it was decided that "due caution was not observed in certain particulars by those responsible for taking over the engines of the Phaëton from the contractors. The several officers concerned have been censured by the Admiralty, and the chief engineer has been removed from the ship."

== Sea-going career ==
=== 1885–1886 ===
The December 1885 Navy List lists her as at Chatham.

In the 1880s, what normally happened with a ship was, "the staff necessary for the efficient maintenance of the machinery is supplied by the Steam Reserve, and when orders are received to commission the ship the men who have been employed upon her are as far as possible selected to compose her engine-room staff. In the case of the Phaëton the men who had been so employed had, from various causes, been drafted away before the order was received to commission her, with the exception of three stokers who formed part of her staff. None of the accidents that subsequently occurred in the ship can be attributed to this cause."

=== 1886–1890 ===
Phaeton was commissioned at Chatham on 20 April 1886. Initially she was listed as on particular service. On 25 May 1886, Phaeton had an accident with a four-barrelled Nordenfeld gun whilst the crew were at quarters and engaged at target practice. The Nordenfeldt gun had been in use, and the crew of seamen who had been engaged in firing it handed it over to a crew of Royal Marines whilst charged, instead of removing the case of cartridges. The Marine crew were engaged in training the gun fore and aft, when someone touched the lever and fired the gun, which swept the deck, at that time crowded with men, four of whom were wounded. At least four cartridges were in the gun, and the bullets went through two iron beams, and two of the ship's bulkheads. The wounded men were not struck by bullets; they were hit by splinters from the bulkheads. At the time of the occurrence Phaeton was about a hundred miles from Plymouth, for which port she made, and on arrival at Plymouth on 27 May three of the wounded were sent to the Royal Naval Hospital for treatment.

In addition the steam steering gear broke down on 25 May. Phaeton left Plymouth on 27 May to continue her cruise. By June 1887 was serving in the Mediterranean.

In her initial months of service, Phaeton suffered from a series of break-downs of her engines. For instance in one accident a piston-rod broke due to a manufacturing defect, and when it broke, cracked one of the cylinders.

=== 1890–1893 ===
Phaeton was recommissioned at Malta on 18 March 1890.

=== 1893–1896 ===
Phaeton was in ordinary at Chatham from 1893 to 1896.

=== 1896 annual manoeuvres ===
Phaeton was commissioned for the 1896 annual manoeuvres on 8 July 1896, and paid off on 19 August.

=== 1897–1900 ===
Phaeton was commissioned at Devonport on 8 June 1897. She was present at the Naval Review on 26 June 1897 at Spithead in celebration of the Queen's Diamond Jubilee. By November 1897 she was serving on the Pacific station. At this time the British naval force on the Pacific Station consisted of:

- Armoured cruiser: Imperieuse flagship of Rear-Admiral Henry St. L.B. Palliser.
- Cruisers: Amphion, Leander, Phaeton
- Destroyers: Sparrowhawk and Virago
- Sloop: Icarus
- Gunboat: Pheasant
- Store and depôt hulk at Coquimbo: Liffey

On 1 August 1900, Phaeton narrowly avoided colliding with USS Iowa coming up the straits approaching Victoria (British Columbia) in a dense fog.

=== 1900–1903 ===
Phaeton was re-commissioned at Esquimalt (Canada) on 10 October 1900 by Captain Ernest James Fleet, to serve on the Pacific Station. In July 1902 she visited Acapulco, and most of the Autumn of that year she was at Panama, before going to Paita, Peru in December 1902. She visited Montevideo in February, then Bahia, São Vicente, Cape Verde and Madeira in March, on her way home to be paid off on 28 April 1903. This commission was the subject of a book in the 'Log' series, entitled: HMS Phaeton, Pacific Station, 1900–1903.

== Harbour service and training hulk ==
Phaeton did harbour service at Devonport from 1904 to 1913, where she was used for training stokers and seamen. Her officers were borne on the books of HMS Vivid.

In 1913 her "stripped out hull" was sold for £15,000 to a charitable institution that ran a training ship for boys based at Liverpool. The charity was founded in 1864 by John Clint, a Liverpool shipowner, with the aim of training the sons of sailors, destitute and orphaned boys to become merchant seamen. The charity's first training ship was the former HMS Indefatigable, an old wooden frigate which served the charity as TS Indefatigable from 1864 to 1914. Mr Frank Bibby, gave the charity money to buy the Phaeton and to refit her at Birkenhead as a training ship. Phaeton was renamed TS Indefatigable and moored off New Ferry in Liverpool on 15 January 1914. The previous Indefatigable had been condemned by the Inspector of Training Ships in 1912 as unfit, and was towed to the West Float at Birkenhead on 5 January 1914, and sold for scrap on 26 March. The figurehead of William IV from the old Indefatigable was transferred to the ex-Phaeton. An Admiralty warrant for a Blue Ensign defaced with a liver bird for TS Indefatigable was issued on 31 December 1927.

"Life on board was tough. Breakfast consisted of one slice of bread and margarine washed down with 'cocoa flush' which had been prepared in the galley by dropping solid slabs of cocoa, unsweetened, in a cauldron of boiling water. The liquid was drawn off into kettles which were lowered to the mess decks where the boys drank it from basins. Cups were never seen on board! Dinner consisted of varieties of 'buzz'. There was pea buzz, Irish buzz and mystery buzz. Buzzes were neither soups nor stews but had the characteristics of both and were served in the same basins as the cocoa flush. A small pile of broken ship's biscuits was placed beside each plate. Boiled cod was the 'treat' on Fridays!"

Phaeton served as TS Indefatigable until 1941, when due to German bombing of English towns, both Indefatigable and TS Conway were ordered to be evacuated. The charity committee decided that the time had come to move the training ship to a shore base, it moved for a time to a temporary base in North Wales. Indefatigable (ex-Phaeton) was then sold to a Preston firm for scrap.

However, she was repurchased by the Admiralty in 1941 and renamed Carrick II, and served as an accommodation hulk at Gourock throughout World War II.

In 1946 she was sold for breaking up to Thos. W. Ward's in Preston, where she arrived on 24 January 1947.

== Logbooks in the UK National Archives ==
Catalogue Number	Start	End
ADM 53/14963	20 April 1886	2 November 1887
ADM 53/14964	3 November 1887	23 July 1888
ADM 53/14965	24 July 1888	9 January 1890
ADM 53/14966	10 January 1890	17 March 1890
ADM 53/14967	18 March 1890	9 March 1891
ADM 53/14968	10 March 1891	28 February 1892
ADM 53/14969	1 March 1892	20 February 1893
ADM 53/14970	21 February 1893	25 August 1893
ADM 53/14971	8 July 1896	19 August 1896
ADM 53/14972	8 June 1897	14 June 1898
ADM 53/14973	15 June 1898	7 June 1899
ADM 53/14974	8 June 1899	22 May 1900
ADM 53/14975	23 May 1900	1 September 1900
ADM 53/14976	10 October 1900	24 March 1902
ADM 53/24832	25 March 1902	28 April 1903
