= Iris-class cruiser =

1870s class of British protected cruisers

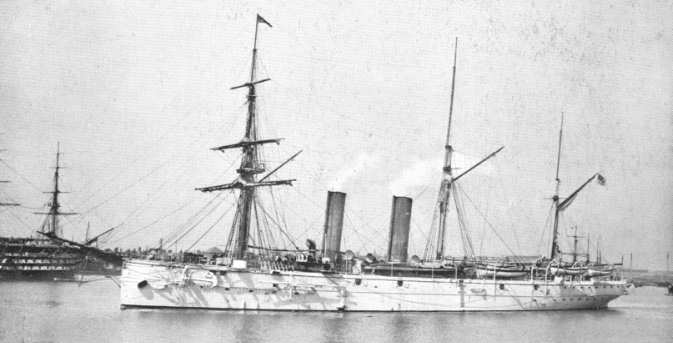
- Mercury

Class overview
- Name: Iris class
- Builders: Pembroke Dockyard, Wales
- Operators: Royal Navy
- Succeeded by: Leander class
- Built: 1875–1879
- In commission: 1877–1914
- Completed: 2
- Scrapped: 2

General characteristics (as built)
- Type: Despatch ship (later protected cruiser)
- Displacement: 3,730 long tons (3,790 t)
- Length: 315 ft (96 m) or 331 ft 6 in (101 m)
- Beam: 46 ft (14 m)
- Draught: 20 ft 6 in (6.2 m)
- Installed power: 12 boilers; 6,000 ihp (4,500 kW)
- Propulsion: 2 × shafts; 2 × compound-expansion steam engines
- Sail plan: Barque-rigged
- Speed: 17 knots (31 km/h; 20 mph)
- Range: 4,400–4,950 nmi (8,150–9,170 km; 5,060–5,700 mi) at 10 knots (19 km/h; 12 mph)
- Complement: 275
- Armament: 10 × 64 pdr rifled muzzle-loading (RML) guns

The Iris class consisted of two ships, HMS Iris and HMS Mercury, built for the Royal Navy in the 1870s. They were the first British all-steel warships.

== Design and description ==
The Iris-class ships were designed as dispatch vessels by William White under the direction of Nathaniel Barnaby, Director of Naval Construction, and were later redesignated as second-class protected cruisers. The only visible difference between the sister ships was that Iris had a clipper bow and was longer than Mercury with her straight stem. Iris was 331 feet 6 inches (101 m) long overall while Mercury was 315 feet (96 m) long. The sisters had a beam of 46 feet (14 m), and a draught of 20 feet 6 inches (6.2 m). They displaced 3,730 long tons (3,790 t) at normal load and were the first British warships with an all-steel hull. Their crew consisted of 275 officers and ratings. The ships were not armoured but extensive internal subdivision gave them some protection against flooding, as did the 150-foot-long (45.7 m) double bottom under the propulsion machinery compartments.

The Iris class was powered by a pair of horizontal four-cylinder Maudslay, Sons and Field compound-expansion steam engines that were configured with a pair of high-pressure cylinders with a bore of 41 inches (100 cm) and a pair of low-pressure cylinders 75 inches (190 cm) in diameter. All cylinders had a 36-inch (91 cm) stroke. Each engine drove one propeller shaft using steam from eight oval and four cylindrical boilers with a working pressure of 65 psi (448 kPa; 5 kgf/cm^{2}). The engines were designed to produce a total of 6,000 indicated horsepower (4,500 kW) for a speed of 17 knots (31 km/h; 20 mph), which was handily exceeded by the sisters. Iris initially reached a maximum speed of 16.6 knots (30.7 km/h; 19.1 mph) from 7,086 ihp (5,284 kW) during her sea trials, but after new propellers were fitted, achieved 17.89 knots (33.13 km/h; 20.59 mph) from 7,330 ihp (5,470 kW). Mercury became the fastest warship in the world when she made 18.57 knots (34.39 km/h; 21.37 mph) from 7,735 ihp (5,768 kW). The ships carried a maximum of 780 long tons (793 t) of coal, enough to steam 4,400–4,950 nautical miles (8,150–9,170 km; 5,060–5,700 mi) at 10 knots (19 km/h; 12 mph). They were initially fitted with a barque sailing rig, but this was removed after a few years.

The Iris-class ships were originally armed with ten 64-pounder (6.3-inch (160 mm)) rifled muzzle-loading (RML) guns, eight on the main deck and the remaining pair on the upper deck on pivot mounts to serve as chase guns fore and aft.

== Ships ==
Name	Builder	Laid down	Launched	Completed	Fate
Iris	Pembroke Dockyard	10 November 1875	12 April 1877	April 1879	Sold for scrap, 11 July 1905
Mercury	Pembroke Dockyard	16 March 1876	17 April 1878	September 1879	Sold for scrap, 9 July 1919

== Construction and career ==
Iris was launched in 1877 and sold in 1905 while Mercury, launched a year later, was hulked at Chatham in 1914 and sold for scrap in 1919.

== Bibliography ==
- Gardiner, Robert, ed. (1992). Steam, Steel and Shellfire: The Steam Warship 1815–1905. Conway's History of the Ship. London: Conway Maritime Press. ISBN 1-55750-774-0.
- Lyon, David & Winfield, Rif (2004). The Sail & Steam Navy List: All the Ships of the Royal Navy 1815–1889. London: Chatham Publishing. ISBN 1-86176-032-9.
- Roberts, John (1979). "Great Britain". In Gardiner, Robert (ed.). Conway's All the World's Fighting Ships 1860–1905. Greenwich: Conway Maritime Press. ISBN 0-8317-0302-4.
