= Mersey-class cruiser =

1887 class of British light cruisers

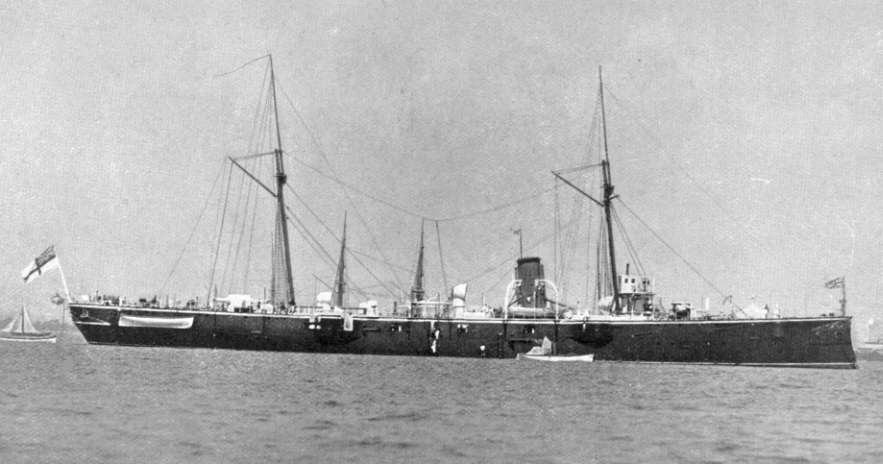
- HMS Mersey

Class overview
- Name: Mersey class
- Operators: Royal Navy; South African Navy
- Preceded by: Calypso-class corvette
- Succeeded by: Marathon class
- Built: 1883–1888
- In commission: 1887–1942
- Planned: 4
- Completed: 4
- Retired: 4

General characteristics
- Type: 2nd class protected cruiser
- Displacement: 4,050 tons
- Length: 315 ft (96 m) oa; 300 ft (91 m) pp
- Beam: 46 ft (14 m)
- Draught: 19 ft 6 in (6 m)
- Installed power: 12 cylindrical boilers; 4,500 ihp
- Propulsion: direct-acting compound expansion; Twin screws
- Speed: 17 knots (31 km/h; 20 mph)
- Range: 8,750 miles at 10 knots (19 km/h; 12 mph)
- Complement: 325
- Armament: 2 × 8 in (203 mm) guns; 10 × 6 in (152 mm) guns; 3 × QF 6 pounder; 3 × 3 pounder QF; 9 × machine guns; 2 × torpedo tubes
- Armour: Deck: 2–4 in (51–102 mm); Gunshields: 2 in (51 mm); Conning tower: 9 in (229 mm)

The Mersey-class cruiser was a class of second class protected cruiser of the Royal Navy commissioned in the late 1880s. They were the first cruisers that had discarded their sailing rigs in the design, making them far more modern in design. They had fairly mundane careers

== Design and description ==
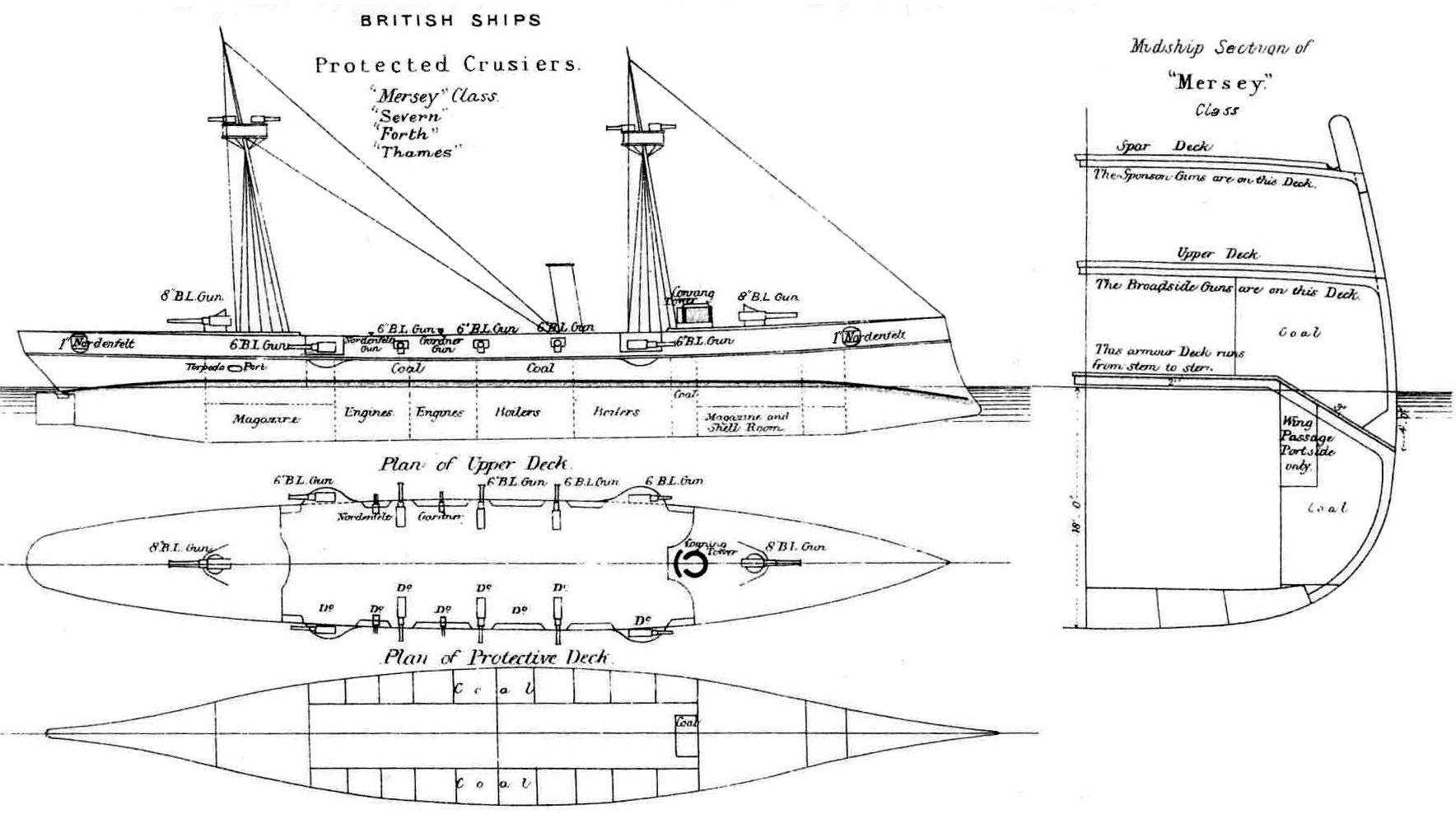
Starboard elevation, deck plan and hull section as depicted in Brassey's Naval Annual, 1888

The Mersey-class cruisers were improved versions of the Leander class with more armour and no sailing rig on a smaller displacement. Like their predecessors, they were intended to protect British shipping. The cruisers had a length between perpendiculars of 300 feet (91.4 m), a beam of 46 feet (14.0 m) and a draught of 20 feet 2 inches (6.1 m). They displaced 4,050 long tons (4,110 t). The ships were powered by a pair of two-cylinder horizontal, direct-acting, compound-expansion steam engines, each driving one shaft, which were designed to produce a total of 6,000 indicated horsepower (4,500 kW) and a maximum speed of 18 knots (33 km/h; 21 mph) using steam provided by a dozen cylindrical boilers with forced draught. The Mersey class carried enough coal to give them a range of 8,750 nautical miles (16,200 km; 10,070 mi) at a speed of 10 knots (19 km/h; 12 mph). The ships' complement was 300to 350 officers and ratings.

Their main armament consisted of two breech-loading (BL) 8-inch (203 mm) guns, one each fore and aft on pivot mounts. Their secondary armament was ten BL 6-inch (152 mm) guns, five on each broadside in sponsons. Protection against torpedo boats was provided by three quick-firing (QF) 6-pounder Hotchkiss guns and three QF 3-pounder Hotchkiss guns. The ship was also armed with a pair of submerged 14-inch (356 mm) torpedo tubes and carried a pair of 14-inch torpedo carriages. The Mersey-class ships were protected by a lower armoured deck that was 2 inches (51 mm) on the flat and 3 inches (76 mm) on the slope. It sloped down at the bow to reinforce the ram. The armoured sides of the conning tower were 9 inches (229 mm) thick.

== Ships ==
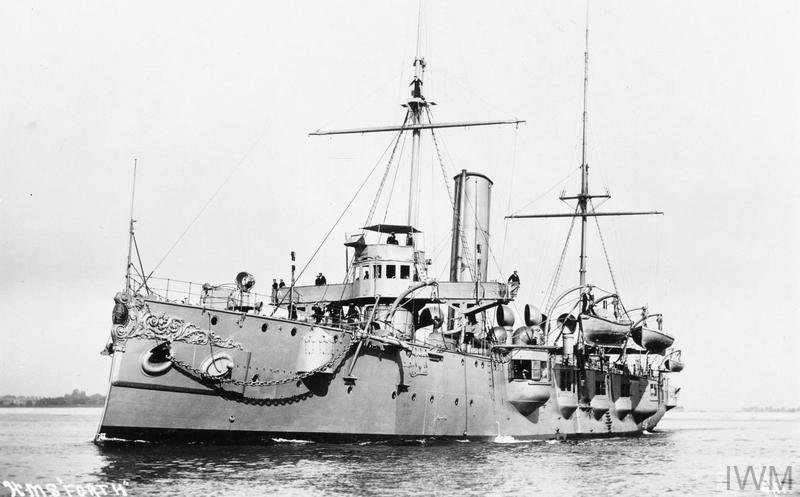
Cruiser HMS Forth

Name	Builder	Laid down	Launched	Completed
HMS Mersey	Chatham Dockyard	9 July 1883	31 March 1885	June 1887
HMS Severn	Chatham Dockyard	1 January 1884	29 September 1885	February 1888
HMS Thames	Pembroke Dockyard	14 April 1884	3 December 1885	July 1888
HMS Forth	Pembroke Dockyard	1 December 1884	23 October 1886	July 1889
