= Edmond Slade =

Royal Navy officer (1859–1928)

Admiral Sir Edmond Slade KCIE KCVO
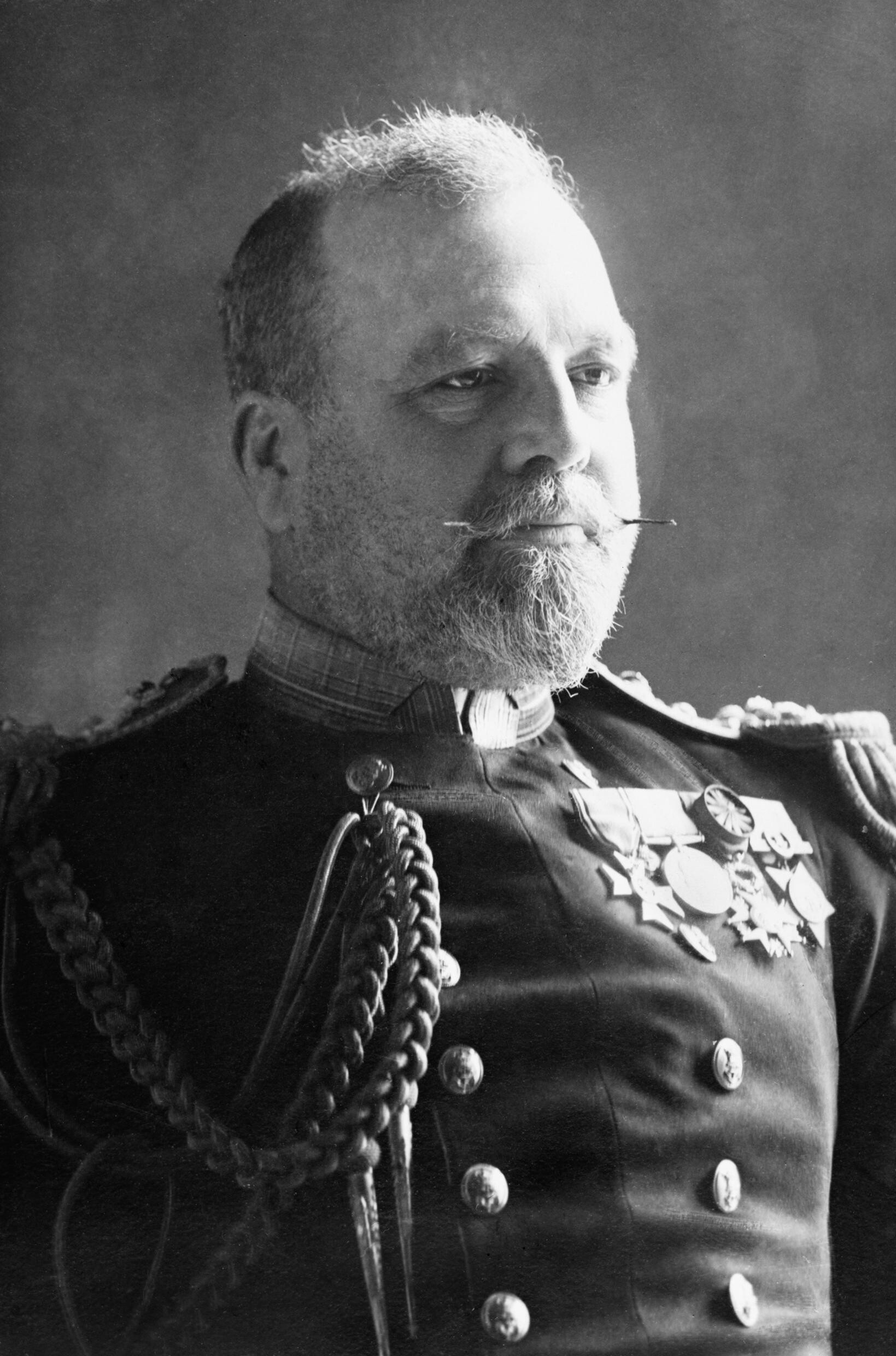
- Died: 20 January 1928 (aged 68)
- Military career
- Allegiance: United Kingdom
- Branch: Royal Navy
- Rank: Admiral
- Commands: Cocktrice; HMS Algerine; HMS Diana; East Indies Station
- Awards: Knight Commander of the Order of the Indian Empire; Knight Commander of the Royal Victorian Order

Admiral Sir Edmond John Warre Slade KCIE KCVO (20 March 1859 – 20 January 1928) was a Royal Navy officer who served as Director of Naval Intelligence. His daughter Madeleine Slade was a follower of Mahatma Gandhi.

== Naval career ==
Born the son of Rev George Fitzclarence Slade (1831–1904) (a Fellow of All Souls College, Oxford and the 11th son of General Sir John Slade), Edmond Slade joined the Royal Navy in 1872. He was appointed to HMS Northumberland as a midshipman in 1874. Promoted to Sub-Lieutenant in 1878, Lieutenant in 1879 and Commander in 1894, he commanded Cocktrice, a paddle gunboat stationed in the Danube to represent Great Britain on the Danube Commission in January 1895.

In 1898 he commanded the sloop HMS Algerine in China. Promoted to captain in December 1899, he commanded the cruiser HMS Diana in the Mediterranean from April 1902. When the King visited Malta in 1903 Slade was appointed MVO. He was made Commander of the Royal Naval War College in 1904 and Director of Naval Intelligence in 1907.

Promoted Rear-Admiral in 1908, he represented the Admiralty at the International Maritime Conference (December 1908 to February 1909) which resulted in the Declaration of London. He became Commander in Chief, East Indies Station in 1909. He was appointed KCIE in 1911 and in 1912 when the King and Queen visited India for the Durbar he was also appointed KCVO.

In 1913 he was sent by Winston Churchill to investigate purchasing a 51% stake in the Anglo-Persian Oil Company. The expedition gave a positive report and the British Government bought a 51% stake in the Anglo-Persian Oil Company just before the outbreak of the First World War. As part of the agreement the Government had the right to appoint two directors, and Slade became one of these, a position he held until his death.

He retired from the Navy with the rank of full Admiral on 1 September 1917.

== Family ==
In 1887 Edmond married Florence Madeleine, eldest daughter of Mr James Carr Saunders of Milton Heath, Dorking (but born in Reigate, Surrey in 1870), and had two daughters: Rhona Warre and Madeline Warre Slade.

== Honours and awards ==

Knight Commander of the Order of the Indian Empire (KCIE)	1911
Knight Commander of the Royal Victorian Order (KCVO)	1912
Member of the Royal Victorian Order (MVO)	1903
Egypt Medal	
Africa General Service Medal	with 'Somaliland 1908-10' clasp
Naval General Service Medal (1915)	with 'Persian Gulf 1909–14' clasp
British War Medal	
King George V Coronation Medal	1911
Officer of the Legion of Honour	(France)
Khedive's Star	(Khedivate of Egypt)

== Notes and references ==
Military offices
Preceded by Charles Ottley	Director of Naval Intelligence; 1907–1909	Succeeded by Alexander Bethell
Preceded by Sir George Warrender	Commander-in-Chief, East Indies Station; 1909–1912	Succeeded by Sir Alexander Bethell
