= Naval Review (magazine) =

Journal of professional record of the Royal Navy

The Naval Review was first published in February 1913. Admiral Sir William Henderson was the founding editor. In 1912 a group of seven Royal Navy and Royal Marines officers had formed a naval society "to promote the advancement and spreading within the service of knowledge relevant to the higher aspects of the naval profession". The seven founders were:

- Captain Herbert Richmond
- Commander Kenneth Dewar
- Commander the Hon. Reginald Plunkett
- Lieutenant Roger Bellairs
- Lieutenant Thomas Fisher
- Lieutenant Henry Thursfield
- Captain Edward Harding, Royal Marine Artillery

The Naval Review is the journal of professional record of the Royal Navy. The Royal Navy and Naval Review - an independent journal whose charitable purposes are to serve the interests of the Royal Navy - have enjoyed over a century of a unique relationship. In respecting this special relationship, and in acknowledgement of established MoD communications policy, the Naval Review is limited to membership by subscription only (ie not on sale, or routinely promulgated, to the wider public). But such agreement, is on the clear understanding that, to the benefit of both the Navy and the Review, that the Naval Review sustains its independent voice and continues to encourage ‘reasonable challenge’ to accepted policy amongst its members.

For its part the Royal Navy values the Naval Review’s central purpose to encourage serving officers to debate relevant professional matters in clear, concise and persuasive ways and develop the art of self-expression and professional knowledge and understanding to the longer-term benefit of the Service.

== See also ==
- Alan Villiers Memorial Lecture
