= HMS Amphion (1883) =

Cruiser of the Royal Navy

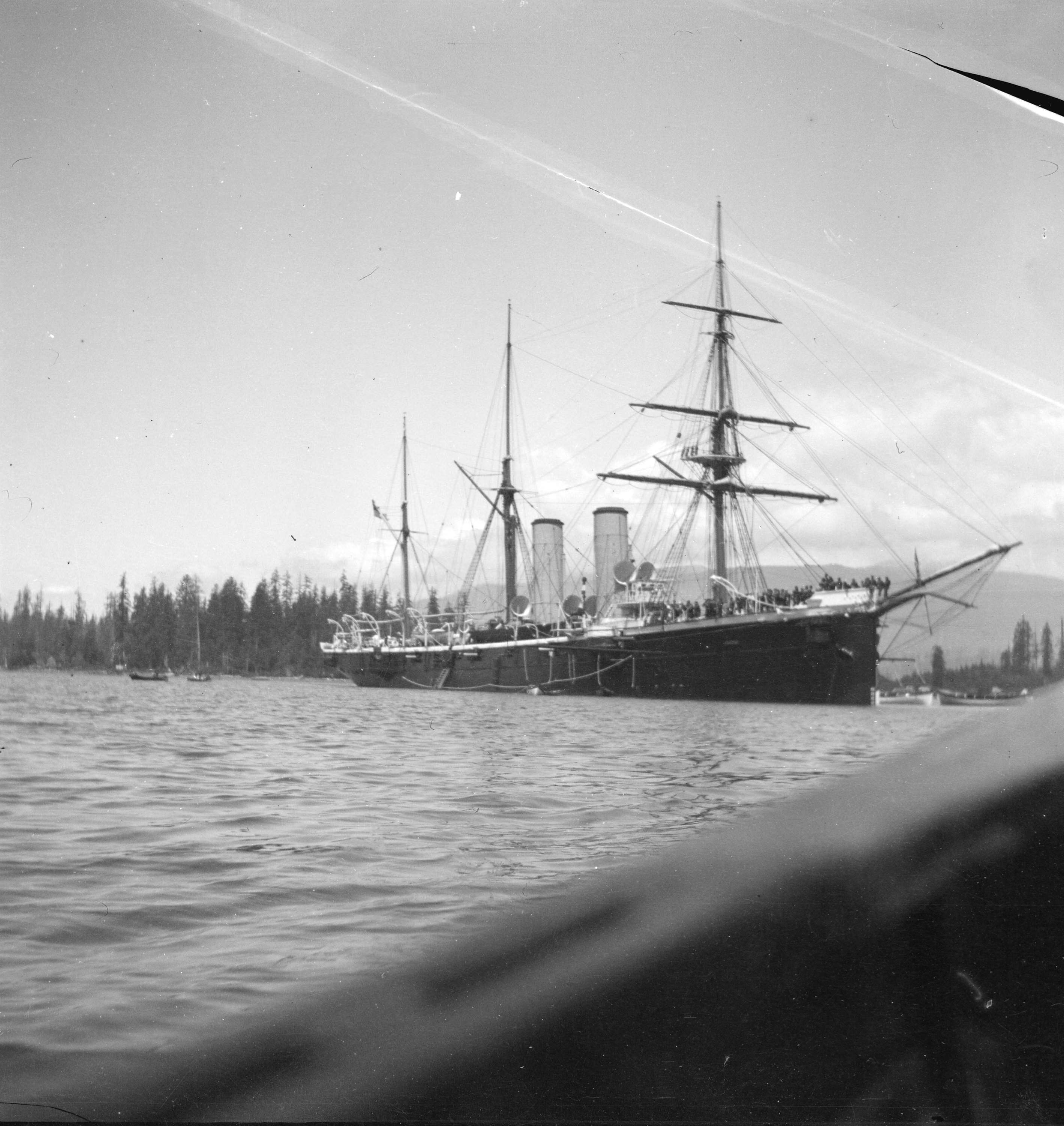
- Amphion moored at Coal Harbour, Vancouver, while serving on the Pacific Station in British Columbia, Canada, 1900.

History

United Kingdom
- Name: HMS Amphion
- Ordered: 1880
- Builder: Pembroke dockyard
- Laid down: 25 April 1881
- Launched: 13 October 1883
- Commissioned: 5 July 1887
- Decommissioned: 25 May 1904
- Fate: Sold 1906

General characteristics
- Class & type: Leander-class second-class partially protected cruiser
- Displacement: 4,300 tons (4,400 tonnes) load.
- Tons burthen: 3,750 tons (B.O.M.).
- Length: 300 ft (91 m) between perpendiculars.; 315 ft 96.01 m) overall.
- Beam: 46 ft (14 m).
- Draught: 20 ft 8 in (6.30 m) aft, 19 ft 6 in (5.94 m) forward; with 950 tons (970 tonnes) of coal and complete with stores and provisions.
- Propulsion: Sails and screw. Two shafts. Two cylinder horizontal direct acting compound engines, 12 cylindrical boilers, 5,500 IHP.
- Speed: 16.5 knots (30.6 km/h; 19.0 mph) designed; 17–18 knots after funnels raised
- Range: 11,000 nmi (20,000 km; 13,000 mi) at 10 knots (19 km/h; 12 mph).; 725 tons coal normal, 1000 tons maximum = c. 6,000 nmi at economical speed.
- Complement: (1885): 275
- Armament: (1885): 10 × 6-inch (152 mm) breechloading guns; 8 1-inch (25.4 mm) Nordenfelt guns; 2 5-barrel and 2 2-barrel 0.45-in machineguns; 4 above water torpedo dischargers.
- Armour: 1.5 in (40mm) steel armoured deck (with sloped sides) over 165 ft.; 1.5 in (40mm) gun shields.
- Notes: Carried 2 second class torpedo boats.; Carried 7-pounder and 9-pounder boat guns and field guns.

HMS Amphion was a second-class cruiser of the Leander class which served with the Royal Navy. She was built at Pembroke Dockyard, being laid down in 1881, launched in 1883, and completed in financial year 1885–86, and then lay in ordinary at Devonport. She was commissioned for the 1887 and 1888 annual manoeuvres. She was recommissioned in December 1888. served in the Pacific until 1890, in the Mediterranean from 1890 to 1895, in ordinary in Devonport from 1895 to 1897 and in the Pacific once more from 1897 to 1904, having a refit in 1900.

== Construction ==
Amphion was built at Pembroke Dockyard, and completed in financial year 1885–86.

The December 1885 Navy List, listed Amphion at Devonport, with her commissioned and warrant officers borne in the Nanking.

== Sea-going career ==
=== Annual manoeuvres 1887 ===
Amphion was commissioned for the annual manoeuvres on 5 July 1887, and paid off on 31 August 1887.

=== Annual manoeuvres 1888 ===
Amphion was commissioned for the annual manoeuvres on 4 July 1888, and paid off on 31 August 1888. In the manoeuvres, hostilities broke out at noon on 24 July 1888, and ended at noon on 20 August.

In the manoeuvres, Vice Admiral John Baird's force represented the British fleet, and England, Scotland and Wales were considered friendly to the British fleet and hostile to the enemy. Opposing Baird was the 'Achill' fleet, led by Rear Admiral George Tryon, and based in Berehaven on the south-west coast of Ireland and Lough Swilly on the north coast. All Irish territory was considered hostile to the British fleet and friendly to the enemy. At the outset Baird's fleet was concentrated on keeping Tryon's fleet shut up in their base ports. They failed. Both Tryon and his second in command broke the blockade on 4 August, and swooping round the extremities of Ireland, made a descent on British commerce and British ports.

Amphion was part of Rear Admiral George Tryon's 'Achill' fleet.

"The Amphion left Lough Swilly with the [new battleship] Rodney, and broke the blockade with her on the night of 4th–5th August. During her cruize in the Channel and up the East Coast of Great Britain she claims the destruction of much shipping; and the capture of the coastguard stations at Scarborough and Wick, also, after leaving Lough Swilly the second time, to have visited Bude with a hostile purpose.

As Scarborough had already been attacked by Severn five days earlier, her visit there could not have been of much effect, neither does it seem that nay useful purpose was served on the occasion of her visit to Wick, as she was taken there in order that her captain might telegraph to the Achill Admiral through the enemy's wires, an impossible condition in wartime. In no case, according to her log, does it appear that the Rules as to Capture of shipping were adhered to."

=== 1888–1892 ===
Amphion was commissioned at Devonport by Captain Edward G. Hulton on 11 December 1888. The January 1889 Navy List, listed Amphion at Devonport, fitting out for service on the Pacific Station,

=== 1892–1895 ===
Amphion was re-commissioned at Malta, by Captain John R.E. Pattisson, on 26 January 1892.

=== 1895–1897 ===
Amphion laid in ordinary at Devonport from 1 March 1895 to 6 January 1897.

=== 1897–1900 ===
Amphion was commissioned at Devonport by Captain Frank Finnis, on 7 January 1897 She served on the Pacific Station. She paid off at Devonport on 13 February 1900, Captain Finnis was appointed to HMS Illustrious.

=== 1900 refit ===
Amphion was refitted at Devonport immediately after she paid off. On 25 February 1900, it was reported that: "The refit of the Amphion at Devonport is to be completed at the earliest possible date. Although the cruiser only paid off last week she has been dismantled and the work is well advanced. She only recently returned from the Pacific station, and it is understood she is to be sent back to that station to relieve the Phaëton or the Leander, which will complete their three years/ commission in June. The Amphion's engines and boilers are in capital condition, although she has served over nine years on foreign stations, and it is believed that her refit can be carried out for £3,000 less than the sum provided for it."

=== 1900–1904 ===
Amphion was commissioned at Devonport by Captain John Casement, on 20 September 1900. She served on the Pacific Station. This commission was the subject of a book in the 'Log' series, entitled: HMS Amphion, Pacific Station, 1901–1904. She arrived at Colón, Panama, in late December 1900. In January 1902, it was reported that Amphion had struck on a reef while on her way from Panama to Callao, was seriously damaged, and had to proceed to Valparaíso for repairs. In early August that year she was back at the station headquarters at Esquimalt. In January 1903 she was reported to be in Paita, Peru, visiting Panama, Acapulco and San Diego before her return to Esquimalt in late March.

== Disposal ==
Amphion was sold in 1906.

== Footnotes ==
Catalogue number	Start	End
ADM 53/12451	5 July 1887	31 August 1887
ADM 53/12452	4 July 1888	31 August 1888
ADM 53/12453	11 December 1888	30 June 1890
ADM 53/12454	1 July 1890	25 January 1892
ADM 53/12455	26 January 1892	4 June 1893
ADM 53/12456	5 June 1893	9 July 1894
ADM 53/12457	10 July 1894	28 February 1895
ADM 53/12458	7 January 1897	6 January 1898
ADM 53/12459	7 January 1898	6 January 1899
ADM 53/12460	7 January 1899	6 January 1900
ADM 53/12461	7 January 1900	13 February 1900
ADM 53/12462	20 September 1900	20 September 1901
ADM 53/12463	21 September 1901	20 September 1902
ADM 53/17021	21 September 1902	31 July 1903
ADM 53/17022	1 August 1903	25 May 1904
