= HMS Mercury (1878) =

Cruiser of the Royal Navy

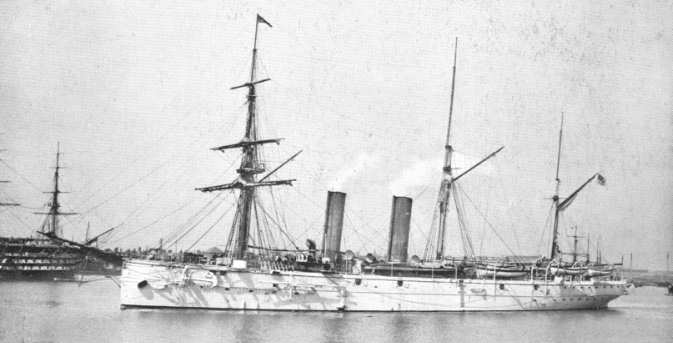
- Mercury

History

United Kingdom
- Name: Mercury
- Builder: Pembroke Dockyard
- Laid down: 16 March 1876
- Launched: 17 April 1878
- Completed: September 1879
- Reclassified: Submarine depot ship, 1905; Hulked, 1914
- Fate: Sold for scrap, 9 July 1919

General characteristics
- Class & type: Iris-class despatch vessel, later second-class cruiser
- Displacement: 3,730 long tons (3,790 t)
- Length: 315 ft (96 m)
- Beam: 46 ft (14 m)
- Draught: 20 ft 6 in (6.2 m)
- Installed power: 12 boilers; 6,000 ihp (4,500 kW)
- Propulsion: 2 × shafts; 2 × compound-expansion steam engines
- Sail plan: Barque-rigged
- Speed: 17 knots (31 km/h; 20 mph)
- Range: 4,950 nmi (9,170 km; 5,700 mi) at 10 knots (19 km/h; 12 mph)
- Complement: 275
- Armament: 10 × 64 pdr rifled muzzle-loading (RML) guns

HMS Mercury was one of two Iris-class despatch vessels, later redesignated as second class cruiser built for the Royal Navy during the 1870s. The two ships were the first all-steel warships in the Royal Navy.

== Design and description ==
The Iris-class ships were designed as dispatch vessels and were later redesignated as second-class protected cruisers. Mercury had an overall length of 315 feet (96 m), a beam of 46 feet (14 m), and a draught of 20 feet 6 inches (6.2 m). The ships displaced 3,730 long tons (3,790 t) at normal load and were the first British warships with an all-steel hull. Their crew consisted of 275 officers and ratings.

The Iris class was powered by a pair of horizontal four-cylinder Maudslay, Sons and Field compound-expansion steam engines, each driving one propeller shaft using steam from eight oval and four cylindrical boilers. The engines were designed to produce a total of 6,000 indicated horsepower (4,500 kW) for a speed of 17 knots (31 km/h; 20 mph). Mercury reached a maximum speed of 18.57 knots (34.39 km/h; 21.37 mph) from 7,735 ihp (5,768 kW), making her the fastest warship in the world. The ship carried enough coal to steam 4,950 nautical miles (9,170 km; 5,700 mi) at 10 knots (19 km/h; 12 mph). Originally equipped with a light barque rig, her spars were soon removed and the class became the first "mastless cruisers".

The Iris-class ships were originally armed with ten 64-pounder (6.3-inch (160 mm)) rifled muzzle-loading (RML) guns, eight on the main deck and the remaining pair on the upper deck on pivot mounts to serve as chase guns fore and aft.

== Construction and career ==
Mercury was laid down at Pembroke Dockyard on 16 March 1876, launched on 17 April 1878 and completed in September 1879.

Mercury served with the Portsmouth Reserve from 1879 to 1890, in China from 1890 to 1895 and with the Portsmouth Reserve again from 1895 to 1903. She served as a navigation school ship for navigating officers from 1903 to 1905 and a submarine depot ship at Portsmouth from 1906 to 1913, and at Harwich in 1913. There were plans to rename her Columbine in 1912, but these were rescinded and instead she was hulked at Rosyth in 1914 with the port depot ship there, HMS Columbine, the former HMS Wild Swan. She was moved to Chatham, where she became an accommodation ship from 7 January 1918, and was paid off in March 1919. She was eventually sold for scrap to the Forth Shipbreaking Company, at Bo'ness, on 9 July 1919.

== Bibliography ==
- Archibald, E.H.H. (1971). The Metal Fighting Ship in the Royal Navy 1860-1970. Ray Woodward (illust.). New York: Arco Publishing Co. ISBN 0-668-02509-3.
- Colledge, J. J.; Warlow, Ben (2006) [1969]. Ships of the Royal Navy: The Complete Record of All Fighting Ships of the Royal Navy from the 15th Century to the Present (3rd Rev ed.). London: Chatham Publishing. ISBN 978-1-86176-281-8. OCLC 67375475.
- Gardiner, Robert, ed. (1992). Steam, Steel and Shellfire: The Steam Warship 1815–1905. Conway's History of the Ship. London: Conway Maritime Press. ISBN 1-55750-774-0.
- Lyon, David & Winfield, Rif (2004). The Sail & Steam Navy List: All the Ships of the Royal Navy 1815–1889. London: Chatham Publishing. ISBN 1-86176-032-9.
- Morris, Douglas (1987). Cruisers of the Royal and Commonwealth Navies. Liskeard: Maritime Books. ISBN 0-907771-35-1.
- Roberts, John (1979). "Great Britain". In Gardiner, Robert (ed.). Conway's All the World's Fighting Ships 1860–1905. Greenwich: Conway Maritime Press. ISBN 0-8317-0302-4.*Warlow, Ben (2000). Shore Establishments of the Royal Navy. Liskeard: Maritime Books. ISBN 978-0-907771-73-9.
