= HMS Iris (1877) =

Cruiser of the Royal Navy

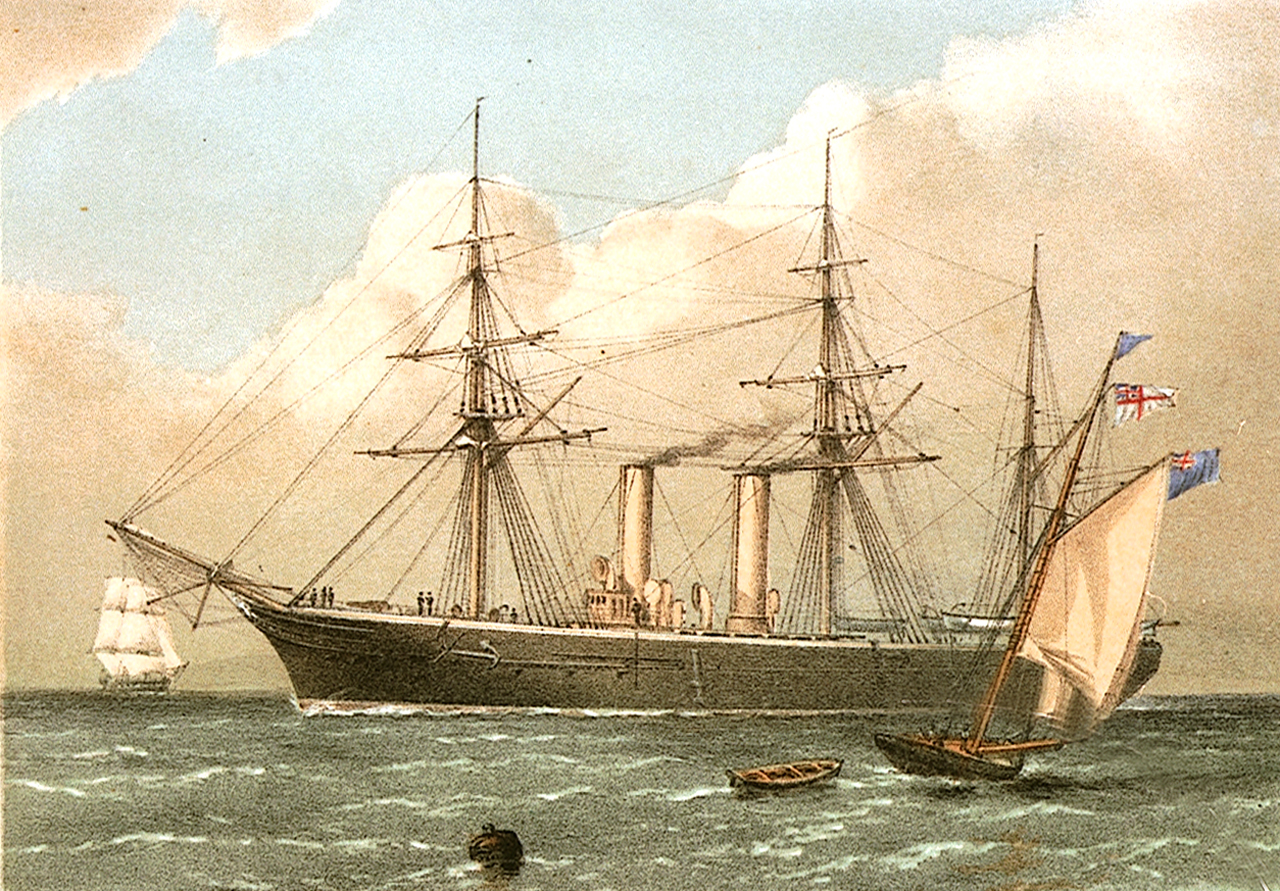
- A lithograph of Iris

History

United Kingdom
- Name: Iris
- Builder: Pembroke Dockyard
- Laid down: 10 November 1875
- Launched: 12 April 1877
- Completed: April 1879
- Fate: Sold for scrap, 11 July 1905

General characteristics (as built)
- Class & type: Iris-class despatch vessel, later second-class cruiser
- Displacement: 3,730 long tons (3,790 t)
- Length: 331 ft 6 in (101 m)
- Beam: 46 ft (14 m)
- Draught: 20 ft 6 in (6.2 m)
- Installed power: 12 boilers; 6,000 ihp (4,500 kW)
- Propulsion: 2 × shafts; 2 × compound-expansion steam engines
- Sail plan: Barque-rigged
- Speed: 17 knots (31 km/h; 20 mph)
- Range: 4,400 nmi (8,100 km; 5,100 mi) at 10 knots (19 km/h; 12 mph)
- Complement: 275
- Armament: 10 × 64 pdr rifled muzzle-loading (RML) guns

HMS Iris the lead ship of her class of two ships built for the Royal Navy in the 1870s. They were the first all-steel warships to serve with the Royal Navy.

== Design and description ==
The Iris-class ships were designed as dispatch vessels and were later redesignated as second-class protected cruisers. Iris had an overall length of 331 feet 6 inches (101 m), a beam of 46 feet (14 m), and a draught of 20 feet 6 inches (6.2 m). They displaced 3,730 long tons (3,790 t) at normal load and were the first British warships with an all-steel hull. Their crew consisted of 275 officers and ratings.

The Iris class was powered by a pair of horizontal four-cylinder Maudslay, Sons and Field compound-expansion steam engines, each driving one propeller shaft using steam from eight oval and four cylindrical boilers. The engines were designed to produce a total of 6,000 indicated horsepower (4,500 kW) for a speed of 17 knots (31 km/h; 20 mph). Iris initially reached a maximum speed of 16.6 knots (30.7 km/h; 19.1 mph) from 7,086 ihp (5,284 kW) during her sea trials, but after new propellers were fitted, achieved 17.89 knots (33.13 km/h; 20.59 mph) from 7,330 ihp (5,470 kW). The ship carried enough coal to steam 4,400 nautical miles (8,100 km; 5,100 mi) at 10 knots (19 km/h; 12 mph). She was initially fitted with a barque sailing rig, but this was removed after a few years.

The Iris-class ships were originally armed with ten 64-pounder (6.3-inch (160 mm)) rifled muzzle-loading (RML) guns, eight on the main deck and the remaining pair on the upper deck on pivot mounts to serve as chase guns fore and aft.

== Construction and career ==
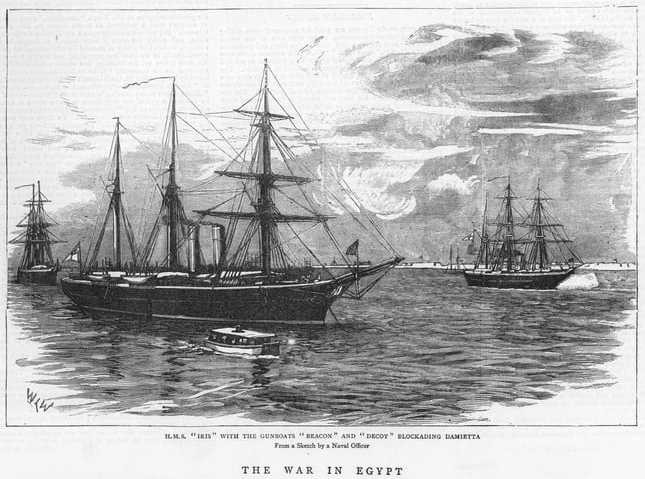
The War in Egypt, HMS Iris with the Gunboats Beacon and Decoy blockading Damietta, The Graphic 1882

Iris was laid down at the Pembroke Dockyard on 10 November 1875, launched on 12 April 1877 and completed in April 1879. She served with the Mediterranean Fleet from 1879 to 1887, then in the Portsmouth Reserve from 1887 to 1903. She was a tender to HMS St Vincent in 1903– 1904 and was sold for scrap on 11 July 1905.

== Bibliography ==
- Media related to HMS Iris (1877) at Wikimedia Commons
- Gardiner, Robert, ed. (1992). Steam, Steel and Shellfire: The Steam Warship 1815–1905. Conway's History of the Ship. London: Conway Maritime Press. ISBN 1-55750-774-0.
- Lyon, David & Winfield, Rif (2004). The Sail & Steam Navy List: All the Ships of the Royal Navy 1815–1889. London: Chatham Publishing. ISBN 1-86176-032-9.
- Morris, Douglas (1987). Cruisers of the Royal and Commonwealth Navies. Liskeard: Maritime Books. ISBN 0-907771-35-1.
- Roberts, John (1979). "Great Britain". In Gardiner, Robert (ed.). Conway's All the World's Fighting Ships 1860–1905. Greenwich: Conway Maritime Press. ISBN 0-8317-0302-4.
