= HMS Naiad (1890) =

Apollo-class protected cruiser of the Royal Navy

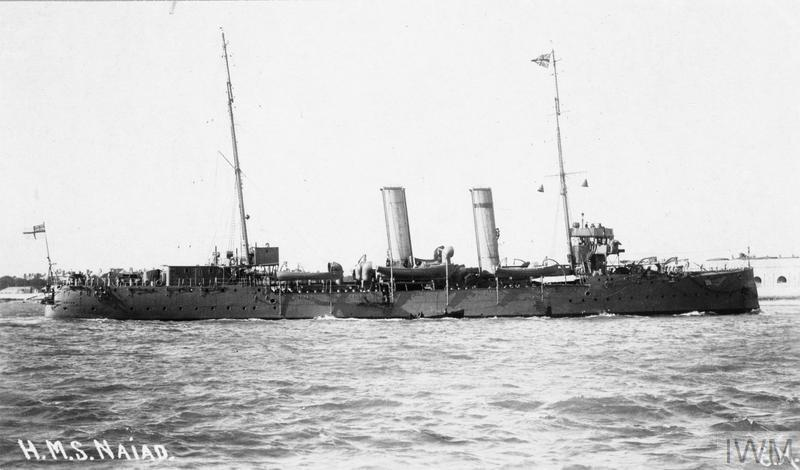
- HMS Naiad, c1914

History

United Kingdom
- Name: HMS Naiad
- Namesake: Naiad
- Builder: Vickers, Barrow-in-Furness
- Laid down: 3 October 1889
- Launched: 29 November 1890
- Commissioned: January 1892
- Fate: Broken up, 1922

General characteristics
- Beam: 43 ft 8 in (13.31 m)
- Draught: 17 ft 6 in (5.33 m)
- Speed: 19.7 knots (22.7 mph; 36.5 km/h)
- Complement: 273 to 275
- Armament: 2 × 6-inch (152 mm) QF guns; 6 × QF 4.7-inch (120 mm) guns; 8 × 6-pounder QF guns; 1 × 3-pounder QF gun; 2 to 4 × 14 in (360 mm) torpedo tubes

HMS Naiad was an Apollo-class protected cruiser of the Royal Navy which served from 1892 to 1919.

== History ==
In 1890, building by the Naval Construction and Armaments Co, later known as Vickers, commenced.

On 26 Jun 1897, she was present at the Naval Review at Spithead in celebration of the Diamond Jubilee.

Captain Alexander Bethell was appointed in command on 19 March 1901, as she was serving in the Mediterranean Fleet. The ship served off South Africa during the Second Boer War (service from April-Nov. 1901) and 117 of her crew of 234 served in Naval Brigades ashore, in the Cape Colony.

The following year she visited Alexandria and Port Said en route for Aden in late October 1902, and her captain served for a time as senior naval officer at Obbia, Sultanate of Hobyo (in today's Somalia). Based in the Indian Sea, she was involved in the military operations in Somaliland 1902–04, her crew receiving 285 medals and clasps for the campaign.

In 1910, like many other ships of her class, Naiad was converted to a minelayer, as she was obsolete as a Cruiser. She was relegated to harbour duties in 1919 and sold for scrap in 1922.

== Publications ==
- Colledge, J. J.; Warlow, Ben (2006) [1969]. Ships of the Royal Navy: The Complete Record of All Fighting Ships of the Royal Navy from the 15th Century to the Present (3rd Rev ed.). London: Chatham Publishing. ISBN 978-1-86176-281-8. OCLC 67375475.
