= Alan Villiers Memorial Lecture =

UK lecture series on naval history

The Alan Villiers Memorial Lecture (AVML) was established by the Society for Nautical Research, the Naval Review, and the Britannia Naval Research Association (BNRA) in 2010 to honour the memory of the author, adventurer, naval officer, photographer and Master Mariner, Captain Alan Villiers. The lecture takes place at a college of the University of Oxford early in Michaelmas Term each year.

The series is now run exclusively by the BNRA, running within the Oxford Naval Symposium at St Anne's College.

== The Villiers Lecturers ==
- 2010. Professor Jeremy Black, University of Exeter. "Naval Power and the World Question: geopolitics, technology and the rise of the West"
- 2011. Rear Admiral James Goldrick, Royal Australian Navy. "From Clones to Counterparts: a Century of Global Naval Cooperation"
- 2012. Professor John B. Hattendorf, U.S. Naval War College. "The Naval War of 1812 in International Perspective"
- 2013. Sir Robin Knox-Johnston ‘A Maritime Empire : the British-India Steam Navigation Company 1856 – 1973’
- 2014 Dr N.A.M. Rodger, All Souls College, Oxford. "The German Submarine War 1914-1918".
- 2015 Professor Andrew Lambert, King's College London, at Pembroke College, Oxford, on Wednesday 14 October, followed by a Trafalgar Dinner.
- 2017 Peter Villiers, Sailors in Square Rig: Joseph Conrad and Alan J. Villiers, a Comparison
- 2018 Bill Cumming Lecture: 'Circumnavigations in Trade: the Voyages of the 'Cape Horners'
- 2019 Martin Muncaster Lecture : 'Witness to A Sinking'
