= HMS Mersey (1885) =

Cruiser of the Royal Navy

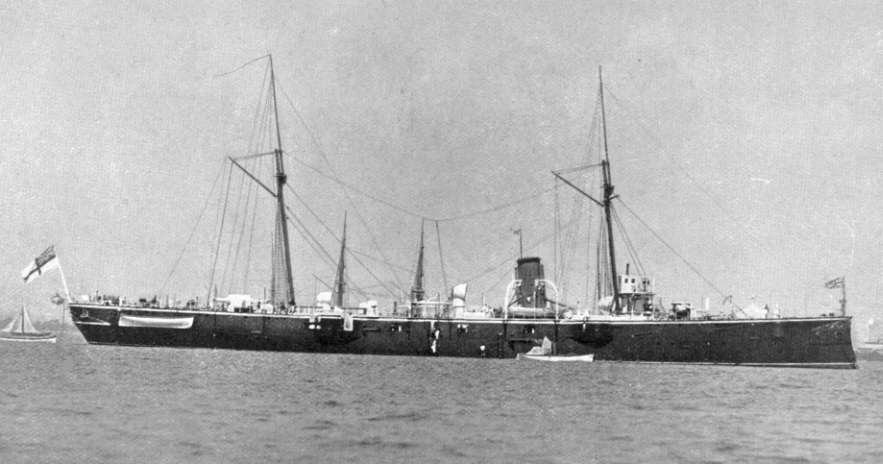

History

United Kingdom
- Name: HMS Mersey
- Builder: Chatham Dockyard; Machinery by Humphrys, Tennant & Co.
- Laid down: 9 July 1883
- Launched: 31 March 1885
- Commissioned: June 1887
- Fate: Sold for scrapping on 4 April 1905

General characteristics
- Class & type: Mersey-class second-class cruiser
- Displacement: 4,050 tons
- Length: 315 ft (96 m) oa; 300 ft (91 m) pp
- Beam: 46 ft (14 m)
- Draught: 19 ft 6 in (6 m)
- Propulsion: 2-cyl horizontal direct-acting compound expansion; 12 cylindrical boilers; Twin screws
- Speed: 17 knots (31 km/h) (4,500 ihp); 18 knots (33 km/h) (6,000 ihp)
- Range: 900 tons coal; 8,750 miles at 10 knots (19 km/h)
- Complement: 325
- Armament: 2 × BL 8-inch (203.2 mm) Mk IV guns; 10 × BL 6-inch (152.4 mm) guns; 3 × QF 6 pounder; 3 × 3 pounder QF; 9 × machine guns; 2 × torpedo tubes
- Armour: Deck: 2-inch (50.80 mm) - 4-inch (101.6 mm); Gunshields: 2-inch (50.80 mm); Conning tower: 9-inch (228.6 mm)

HMS Mersey was a Mersey-class second class protected cruiser. She was launched in 1885, but had a relatively mundane career and was sold for breaking in 1905.

== Design ==
The Mersey-class cruisers were relatively modern, in that they were the first cruisers that had discarded their sailing rigs in the design, that was synonymous with the old wooden warships and were now solely steam powered warships.

== Construction and career ==
Mersey was built at Chatham Dockyard and launched on 31 March 1885.

In February 1903, she took the crew of HMS Severn and succeeded that ship as coastguard ship at Harwich.
