= HMS Arethusa (1882) =

Cruiser of the Royal Navy

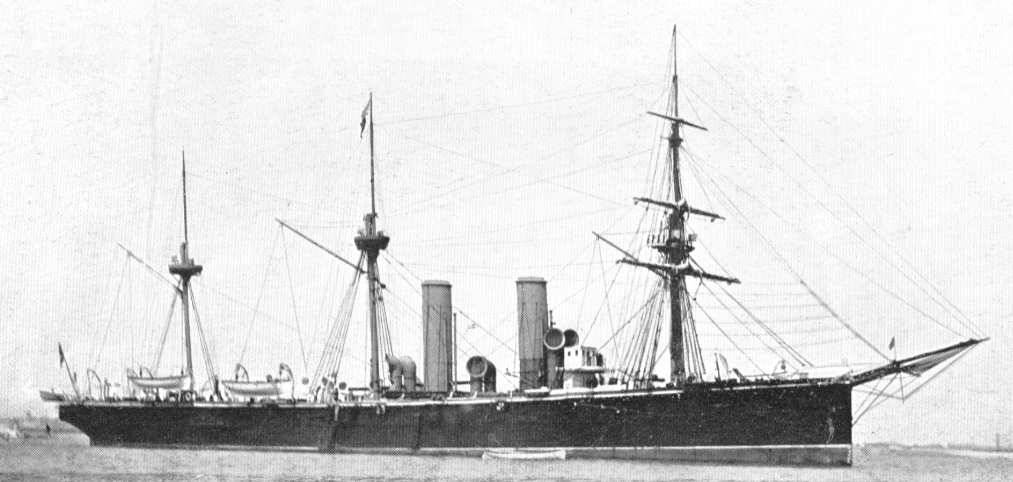
- Arethusa's sister ship Leander in 1897.

History

United Kingdom
- Name: HMS Arethusa
- Ordered: 1880
- Builder: Napier, Glasgow
- Laid down: 14 June 1880
- Launched: 23 December 1882
- Commissioned: 8 July 1887
- Decommissioned: 3 April 1903 (as sea-going warship)
- Fate: Sold 4 April 1905.

General characteristics
- Class & type: Leander-class second-class partially protected cruiser
- Displacement: 4,300 long tons (4,400 tonnes) load.
- Length: 300 ft (91 m) between perpendiculars.; 315 ft 96.01 m) overall.
- Beam: 46 ft (14 m).
- Draught: 20 ft 8 in (6.30 m) aft, 19 ft 6 in (5.94 m) forward; with 950 tons (970 tonnes) of coal and complete with stores and provisions.
- Installed power: 12 cylindrical boilers, 5,500 ihp (4,100 kW).
- Propulsion: Sails and screw. Two shafts. Two cylinder horizontal direct acting compound engines,
- Speed: 16.5 knots (30.6 km/h; 19.0 mph) designed; 17-18 knots after funnels raised
- Range: 11,000 nmi (20,000 km; 13,000 mi) at 10 knots (19 km/h; 12 mph).; 725 tons coal normal, 1000 tons maximum = c. 6,000 nmi at economical speed.
- Complement: (1885): 278
- Armament: (1885): 10 × 6-inch Breechloading guns; 8 1-inch Nordenfelt guns; 2 5-barrel and 2 2-barrel 0.45-in machineguns; 4 above water torpedo dischargers.
- Armour: 1.5 in (40mm) steel armoured deck (with sloped sides) over 165 ft.; 1.5 in (40mm) gun shields.
- Notes: Carried 2 second class torpedo boats.; Carried 7-pounder and 9-pounder boat guns and field guns.

HMS Arethusa was a second-class cruiser of the Leander class, which served with the Royal Navy. She was built at Napier, Glasgow, being laid down in 1880, launched in 1882 and completed in financial year 1886–87. She remained in ordinary reserve at Chatham, being commissioned for the 1887, 1888, 1889, 1890, and 1892 annual manoeuvres. She served in the Mediterranean from 1893 to 1896, was commissioned for the 1899 annual manoeuvres, then recommissioned for the Pacific, and later sent as a reinforcement to the China Station during the Boxer Rebellion until she came home for the last time in 1903.

== Construction ==
Arethusa was built at Napier, Glasgow, and completed in financial year 1886–87.

== Sea-going career ==
She lay in ordinary at Chatham after completion only being commissioned for the annual manoeuvres until 1892.Arethusa was commissioned at Chatham on 16 May 1893 and served in the Mediterranean. She paid off at Chatham on 22 July 1896 and then laid in ordinary at Chatham from 23 July 1896 to 10 July 1899. On 11 July 1899 she was commissioned for the annual manoeuvres, and paid off on 13 August.

Arethusa was commissioned at Chatham on 14 November 1899. Initially she served on the Pacific Station. In 1901 she was sent out as a reinforcement to the China Station for the protection of the lives and property of British subjects during the Boxer Rebellion. Arethusa remained on the China Station until she was relieved by Thetis, then she returned to England and paid off for the last time on 3 April 1903. This commission was the subject of a book in the 'Log' series, entitled: HMS Arethusa, went Round the World, 1899–1903.

== Disposal ==
Arethusa was sold on 4 April 1905.
