= List of ship launches in 1879 =

The list of ship launches in 1879 includes a chronological list of some ships launched in 1879.

| Date | Ship | Class / type | Builder | Location | Country | Notes |
|---|---|---|---|---|---|---|
| 13 January | Harelda | Steamship | Mounsey & Foster | Sunderland | United Kingdom | For G. Porteous. |
| 23 January | Arab | Steamship | James & George Thomson | Clydebank | United Kingdom | For Union Steamship Company. |
| 23 January | Hugh Sleigh | Steamship | Messrs. Palmer's | Jarrow-on-Tyne | United Kingdom | For Messrs. J. & R. Bovey. |
| 23 January | Orion | Belleisle-class ironclad | Samuda Brothers | Poplay | United Kingdom | For Royal Navy. |
| 23 January | Traveller | Full-rigged ship | Messrs. Birrell, Stenhouse & Co | Dumbarton | United Kingdom | For R. C. Haws. |
| 24 January | Bunyip | Dredger | W. Simons & Co. | Renfrew | United Kingdom | For Melbourne Harbour Commissioners. |
| 24 January | White Rose | Steamship | Messrs. H. M'Intyre & Co | Paisley | United Kingdom | For John Hobson. |
| 25 January | Balmuir | Steamship | Messrs. Gourlay Bros. | Dundee | United Kingdom | For Red Diamond Line. |
| 25 January | Electra | Steamship | Messrs. Dobie & Co. | Govan | United Kingdom | For Deutsche Dampschiffs Rhederei. |
| 25 January | Harlsey | Steamship | Messrs. William Gray & Co. | West Hartlepool | United Kingdom | For Messrs. R. Ropner & Co. |
| 25 January | Navidad | Steamship | Messrs. H. M'Intyre & Co. | Paisley | United Kingdom | For Compagnie Hispano-Française. |
| 25 January | San Juan | Steamship | Messrs. Murdoch & Murray | Port Glasgow | United Kingdom | For Messrs. Fiminez & Sons. |
| 29 January | Shahzada | Cargo ship | Harland & Wolff | Belfast | United Kingdom | For Asiatic Steamship Co. |
| January | Clavernouse | Steamship | Messrs. Alexander Stephen & Spns | Linthouse | United Kingdom | For Messrs. John Dunn & Co. |
| January | Ellora | Steamship | Messrs. R. Napier & Sons | Govan | United Kingdom | For British India Steam Navigantion Company. |
| January | Escurial | Steamship | Messrs. Alexander Stephen & Sons | Linthouse | United Kingdom | For Messrs. Raeburn & Vurel. |
| January | Seascale | Steamship | Messrs. John Blumer & Co. | Sunderland | United Kingdom | For private owner. |
| 1 February | Alexander Cook | Fishing boat | Alexander Wood | Branderburgh | United Kingdom | For Alexander Souter. |
| 1 February | Primrose | Fishing boat | William Wood | Branderburgh | United Kingdom | For Alexander M'Leod. |
| 6 February | Forfait | Villars-class cruiser | Forges et Chantiers de la Méditerranée | La Seyne | France | For French Navy. |
| 8 February | Buckingham | Steamship | Messrs. M. Pearse & Co. | Stockton-on-Tees | United Kingdom | For private owner. |
| 8 February | Cambria | Steamship | R. Smith | Preston | United Kingdom | For Mr. Oldfield and others. |
| 8 February | Douro | Steamship | Messrs. G. K. Stothert & Co. | Bristol | United Kingdom | For Messrs. G. K. Stothert & Co. |
| 8 February | Hartor | Steamship | Messrs. Richardson, Duck & Co. | South Stockton-on-Tees | United Kingdom | For J. H. Bushby. |
| 8 February | Waterloo | Steamship | James Laing | Deptford | United Kingdom | For private owner. |
| 10 February | Pilgrim | Schooner | T. T. Parry | Bangor | United Kingdom | For Messrs. Jones & Roberts. |
| 11 February | Clan Gordon | Steamship | Messrs. Alexander Stephen & Sons | Linthouse | United Kingdom | For Clan Line. |
| 11 February | Tarleton Lass | Merchantman | Mr. Lund | Southport | United Kingdom | For private owner. |
| 11 February | Wuhu | Steamship | Messrs. Scott & Co. | Greenock | United Kingdom | For private owner. |
| 18 February | Prins Hendrick | Steamship | Messrs. C. Mitchell & Co. | Low Walker | United Kingdom | For "West African Trading Company". |
| 19 February | Royal Saxon | Steamship | J. P. Rennoldson | South Shields | United Kingdom | For Messrs. Sharp Bros. |
| 20 February | Koningin Emma der Nederlanden | Atjeh-class cruiser | Rijkswerf | Amsterdam | Netherlands | For Royal Netherlands Navy. |
| 20 February | Serra | Steamship | London and Glasgow Shipbuilding Company (Limited) | Govan | United Kingdom | For Don José Serra y Font. |
| 21 February | Clan Stuart | Steamship | Messrs. A. M'Millan & Sons | Dumbarton | United Kingdom | For Clan Line. |
| 22 February | Bute | Steamship | Messrs. Scott & Macgill | Bowling | United Kingdom | For Messrs. Hill & Co. |
| 22 February | Capri | Steamship | Messrs. Palmer & Co. | Jarrow | United Kingdom | For Messrs. Richard Nicholson & Sons. |
| 22 February | Cymbeline | Steamship | Messrs. Richardson, Duck & Co. | South Stockton-on-Tees | United Kingdom | For private owners. |
| 22 February | West Cumberland | Steamship | Joseph L. Thompson | Sunderland | United Kingdom | For Hine Bros. |
| 22 February | Euphrates | Barque | Messrs. H. Murray & Co. | Paisley | United Kingdom | For Messrs. Watson Bros. |
| 22 February | Joseph Rickett | Steamship | Messrs. John Key & Sons | Kinghorn | United Kingdom | For private owner. |
| 22 February | Robert Dickinson | Steamship | Messrs. Leslie & Co. | Hebburn | United Kingdom | For Messrs. Bell & Shymons. |
| 22 February | Roraima | Steamship | Messrs. Edward Withy & Co. | Middleton | United Kingdom | For George Steel. |
| 22 February | Teaser | Steamboat | S. S. Welch | Stockton-on-Tees | United Kingdom | For Imperial Tramways Co. |
| 22 February | Trident | Steamship | Messrs. W. Simons & Co. | Renfrew | United Kingdom | For London, Brighton and South Coast Railway. |
| 24 February | Chindwara | Steamship | Messrs. William Denny & Bros. | Dumbarton | United Kingdom | For British India Steam Navigation Company. |
| 24 February | Dowlais | Steamship | Messrs. Palmer & Co's Iron and Shipbuilding Company. | Jarrow | United Kingdom | For Messrs. Morel Bros. |
| 24 February | Prinses Marie | Steamship | Messrs. John Elder & Sons | Fairfield | United Kingdom | For Nederlandsche Stoomboot Maatschappij. |
| February | Acacia | Steamship | Messrs. William Hamilton & Co. | Port Glasgow | United Kingdom | For Messrs. J. Shaw Campbell & Co. |
| February | Devonport No. 35 | Dredger | Messrs. Thomas Wingate & Co. | Whiteinch | United Kingdom | For British Government. |
| February | Hustace | Steamship | | | United Kingdom | For private owner. |
| February | Stanley | Paddle tug | Messrs. John Fullarton & Co. | Paisley | United Kingdom | For private owner. |
| February | Strassburg | Towboat | Hamilton's Windsor Ironworks Limited | Garston | United Kingdom | For private owner. |
| 6 March | Lapwing | Steamship | Messrs. Gourlay, Brothers & Co. | Dundee | United Kingdom | For General Steam Navigation Company. |
| 8 March | Ashburne | Steamship | Short Bros. | Sunderland, County Durham | United Kingdom | For J. S. Barwick & Co. |
| 8 March | Hungarian | Steamship | Messrs. Blackwood & Gordon | Port Glasgow | United Kingdom | For Messrs. Burrell & Son. |
| 8 March | John and Mary | Yawl | T. Walker | Scarborough | United Kingdom | For Mr. Crawford. |
| 8 March | Lydia | Steamship | Messrs. Dobie & Co. | Govan | United Kingdom | For Duetsche Dampschiffs Rhederei. |
| 8 March | Marion | Steamship | Abercorn Shipbuilding Company | Paisley | United Kingdom | For Whitecross Wire and Iron Co. |
| 10 March | Annie | Steamship | Messrs. Turnbull & Son | Whitehall | United Kingdom | For Messrs. James Gray & Co. |
| 10 March | Arizona | Passenger ship | John Elder and Co. | Fairfield | United Kingdom | For Guion Line. |
| 10 March | Radnor | Steamship | Messrs. Palmer & Co. | Jarrow | United Kingdom | For Messrs. John & Herbert Cory. |
| 10 March | Rhynland | Passenger ship | Barrow Shipbuilding Company | Barrow-in-Furness | United Kingdom | For Red Star Line. |
| 11 March | Falls of Bruar | Full-rigged ship | Messrs. Russell & Co. | Port Glasgow | United Kingdom | For Wright & Breckenridge. |
| 11 March | Gertrude | Steamship | Messrs. William Gray & Co. | West Hartlepool | United Kingdom | For Otto Trechmann. |
| 11 March | Mercurio | Steamship | Messrs. James & George Thompson | Clydebank | United Kingdom | For Messrs. Gledhill & Dishart. |
| 11 March | San Jose | Steamship | Messrs. H. M'Intyre & Co. | Merksworth | United Kingdom | For Compagnie Hispano-Française. |
| 11 March | Mytho | Transport ship | Arsenal de Cherbourg | Cherbourg | France | For French Navy. |
| 13 March | Dodo | Steamship | Messrs. Cunliffe & Dunlop | Port Glasgow | United Kingdom | For British and African Steam Navigation Co. |
| 13 March | Rose Ann | Steam lighter | H. M. McIntyre | Paisley | United Kingdom | For James O'Brien. |
| 24 March | County of Aberdeen | Merchantman | Messrs. Barclay, Curle & Co. | Whiteinch | United Kingdom | For private owner. |
| 24 March | Salerno | Steamship | Earle's Shipbuilding and Engineering Co. | Hull | United Kingdom | For Messrs. Thomas Wilson, Sons, & Co. |
| 24 March | Senior | Steamship | Messrs. Raylton Dixon & Co. | Middlesbrough | United Kingdom | For W. Ruys en Zonen. |
| 24 March | Sirdhana | Steamship | Messrs. William Denny & Bros. | Dumbarton | United Kingdom | For British India Steam Navigation Company (Limited). |
| 25 March | Zulu | Steamship | Messrs. M. Pearse & Sons | Stockton-on-Tees | United Kingdom | For private owners. |
| 25 March | Henry Edye | Steamship | William Doxford & Sons | Sunderland | United Kingdom | For Steinmann, Ludwig & Co. |
| 26 March | Maharaja | Cargo ship | Harland & Wolff | Belfast | United Kingdom | For Asiatic Steamship Co. |
| 27 March | David Law | Full-rigged ship | Messrs. Birrell, Stenhouse & Co | Dumbarton | United Kingdom | For David Law. |
| 27 March | Faugh-a-Ballaugh | Dredger | Messrs. Thomas Wingate & Co. | Whiteinch | United Kingdom | For British Government. |
| 29 March | Malvina | Steamship | Messrs. James & George Thomson | Clydebank | United Kingdom | For London and Edinburgh Shipping Co. |
| March | Malvina | Steamship | Messrs. J. & G. Thomson | Dalmuir | United Kingdom | For London and Edinburgh Shipping Co. |
| March | Mercutio | Steamship | Messrs. J. & G. Thomson | Dalmuir | United Kingdom | For Messrs. Gledhill & Dishart. |
| March | Pallion | Steamship | Messrs. William Gray & Co. | West Hartlepool | United Kingdom | For West Hartlepool Steam Navigation Co. |
| March | Tabasco | Steamship | Messrs. Alexander Stephen & Sons | Linthouse | United Kingdom | For MM Jenequel Frères. |
| March | Theben | Steamship | Reiherstieg Schiffswerfte & Maschinenfabrik | Hamburg | Germany | For Deutsche Dampschiffahrtsgesellschaft Kosmos. |
| March | Thistle | Steamship | | | United Kingdom | For Joh Crawford. |
| March | Useful | Schooner | William Ashburner | Barrow-in-Furness | United Kingdom | For Thomas Ashburner. |
| 5 April | Craiglands | Steamship | Messrs. William Gray & Co. | West Hartlepool | United Kingdom | For Messrs. Hardy, Wilson & Co. |
| 5 April | Mercedes | Steamship | Mounsey & Foster | Sunderland | United Kingdom | For Adamson & Ronaldson. |
| 5 April | Patrick Stewart | Cable layer | Messrs. Kay | Kinghorn | United Kingdom | For Indian Government. |
| 7 April | Bellingham | Steamship | Messrs. A. Leslie & Co. | Hebburn | United Kingdom | For Messrs. James Turpie & partners. |
| 7 April | Koningin Emma | Steamship | Messrs. Richardson, Duck & Co. | South Stockton-on-Tees | United Kingdom | For Stoomvaart Maatschappij Java. |
| 8 April | Alpha | Steamship | Messrs. M'Kenzie & Gunn | Thurso | United Kingdom | For Messrs. Miller & Leith. |
| 8 April | Ash | Steamship | Blumer & Co. | Sunderland | United Kingdom | For Peacock Bros. |
| 8 April | Edward Cooper | Schooner | Samuel Pine | Greenpoint, New York | United States | For New York Pilots. |
| 8 April | Irene Morris | Steamship | Whitehaven Shipbuilding Co. | Whitehaven | United Kingdom | For private owner. |
| 8 April | Medway | Steamship | Messrs. S. P. Austin & Hunter | Sunderland | United Kingdom | For Lambert Bros. |
| 8 April | Milanese | Steamship | Robert Thompson Jr. | Southwick | United Kingdom | For J. Glynn & Son. |
| 8 April | Viceroy | Steamship | Messrs. Raylton Dixon & Co. | Middlesbrough | United Kingdom | For Messrs. E. Harris & Co. |
| 9 April | Cosmo | Steamship | Messrs. A. M'Millan & Son | Dumbarton | United Kingdom | For Messrs. Tellefsen, Wills & Co. |
| 9 April | Fiona | Yacht | Messrs. Camper & Nicholson | Gosport | United Kingdom | For private owner. |
| 10 April | Cyprus | Steamship | Messrs. H. M'Intyre & Co. | Paisley | United Kingdom | For Eugene Collins. |
| 10 April | Otto Eichmann | Steamship | | Jarrow | United Kingdom | For O. L. Eichmann. |
| 12 April | Marinho Visconde | Paddle steamer | Messrs. Caird & Co | Greenock | United Kingdom | For Bahia Steam Navigation Co. |
| 19 April | Mennythorpe | Steamship | Messrs. William Gray & Co. | West Hartlepool | United Kingdom | For Messrs. Coverdale, Todd & Co. |
| 19 April | Ulva | Steam yacht | Messrs. Scott & Co. | Greenock | United Kingdom | For F. A. Hankey. |
| 21 April | Escambia | Steamship | Mounsey & Foster | Sunderland | United Kingdom | For Crow, Bogard & Co. |
| 21 April | Winfred | Steamship | Messrs. Mounsey & Foster | Sunderland | United Kingdom | For private owner. |
| 22 April | City of Dublin | Steamship | Messrs. Edward Withy & Co. | Middleton | United Kingdom | For Messrs. Palgrave, Murphy & Co. |
| 22 April | Coleridge | Steamship | Messrs. M. Pearse & Co. | Stockton-on-Tees | United Kingdom | For private owner. |
| 22 April | Lord Collingwood | Steamship | Tyne Iron Shipbuilding Company | Willington Quay | United Kingdom | For Messrs. C. Tully & Co. |
| 22 April | Sayonara | Yacht | Messrs. John Reid & Co. | Port Glasgow | United Kingdom | For G. W. Richardson. |
| 22 April | Whimbrel | Steamship | Messrs. W. H. Potter & Son | Liverpool | United Kingdom | For Cork Steam Ship Company. |
| 23 April | Ban-Righ | Schooner | Messrs. J. & W. Geddie | Banff | United Kingdom | For David Sinclair and others. |
| 23 April | Clan Lamont | Steamship | Messrs. Alexander Stephen & Sons | Linthouse | United Kingdom | For Clan Line. |
| 24 April | Arauco | Steamship | Messrs. Gourlay, Brothers, & Co. | Dundee | United Kingdom | For Pacific Steam Navigation Company. |
| 24 April | Rumney | Steamship | William Doxford & Sons | Sunderland | United Kingdom | For Messrs. John Cory, Sons, & Co. |
| 24 April | Scindia | Steamship | Messrs. William Denny & Bros. | Dumbarton | United Kingdom | For British India Steam Navigation Company (Limited). |
| 26 April | Maharani | Cargo ship | Harland & Wolff | Belfast | United Kingdom | For Asiatic Steam Navigation Co. |
| 26 April | Navarchos Miaoulis | Cruiser | Forges et Chantiers de la Méditerranée | La Seyne | France | For Royal Hellenic Navy. |
| 28 April | Alexandra | Paddle steamer | Messrs. Scott & Co. | Cartsdyke | United Kingdom | For Portsmouth, Ryde, and Isle of Wight Steampacket Company. |
| 29 April | Edinburgh Castle | Paddle steamer | Messrs. R. Duncan & Co. | Port Glasgow | United Kingdom | For Lochgoil and Loch Long Steamboat Company. |
| April | Stanley | Schooner | Apps | Bosham | United Kingdom | For William Barnby. |
| April | Not named | Paddle steamer | Messrs. John Reid & Co. | Port Glasgow | United Kingdom | For private owner. |
| 3 May | Eivian | Barque | Osbourne, Graham and Co, | Sunderland | United Kingdom | For North Wales Shipping Co. Ltd. |
| 3 May | Fire Queen | Steamship | J. E. Scott | Cartsdyke | United Kingdom | For Messrs. Henry Lamont & Co. |
| 5 May | Gadfly | Ant-class gunboat | | Pembroke Dockyard | United Kingdom | For Royal Navy. |
| 5 May | Peninsular | Steamship | Messrs. J. L. Thompson & Sons | Monkwearmouth | United Kingdom | For Henry Schofield and Messrs. Charles Tully & Co. |
| 5 May | Pincher | Ant-class gunboat | | Pembroke Dockyard | United Kingdom | For Royal Navy. |
| 6 May | Abeona | Steamship | Messrs. Raylton Dixon & Co. | Middlesbrough | United Kingdom | For Messrs. E. Harris & Co. |
| 6 May | Bedouin | Steamship | Messrs. C. Mitchell & Co. | Low Walker | United Kingdom | For Messrs. W. & R. Thompson. |
| 6 May | City of Agra | Steamship | Messrs. Charles Connell & Co. | Scotstoun | United Kingdom | For City Line. |
| 6 May | Edgar | Steamship | Messrs. Turnbull & Son | Whitby | United Kingdom | For Messrs. Turnbull & Co. |
| 6 May | Waterloo | Steamship | London and Glasgow Shipbuilding Company (Limited) | Govan | United Kingdom | For Messrs. Allan C. Gow & Co. |
| 7 May | Grandholm | Steamship | Messrs. Hall, Russell & Co. | Footdee | United Kingdom | For Messrs. W. Leslie & Co. |
| 7 May | Shamrock | Steamship | Messrs. A. & J. Inglis | Pointhouse | United Kingdom | For Laird's Line. |
| 8 May | Amethyst | Steamship | Messrs. Gourlay Bros., & Co. | Dundee | United Kingdom | For P. M. Duncan. |
| 9 May | Omonia | Tug | Messrs. Wouldhave & Johnson | North Shields | United Kingdom | For Messrs. Hepple & Co. |
| 10 May | Velocity | Tender | Messrs. Raylton Dixon & Co. | Middlesbrough | United Kingdom | For Great Grimsby Ice Co. |
| 12 May | Hesper | Barge | J. H. Vaux | Harwich Dockyard | United Kingdom | For private owner. |
| 12 May | Retreiver | Cable ship | Messrs. Blackwood & Gordon | Port Glasgow | United Kingdom | For Eastern Telegraph Company. |
| 12 May | Rio Apa | Paddle steamer | Messrs. Henry Murray & Co. | Port Glasgow | United Kingdom | For David Rowan. |
| 13 May | Möwe | Gunboat | Schichau-Werke | Elbing | United Kingdom | For Kaiserliche Marine. |
| 13 May | Ranee | Steam yacht | Messrs. David & William Henderson & Co. | Partick | United Kingdom | For private owner. |
| 20 May | Fijenoord | Steamship | Fijenoord | Rotterdam | Netherlands | For Nederlandse Stoomboot Maatschappij. |
| 21 May | Alexander M. Lawrence | Schooner | C. & R. Poillon | Brooklyn, New York | United States | For New York Pilots. |
| 21 May | Plastun | Kreiser-class frigate | Baltic Works | Saint Petersburg | Russia | For Imperial Russian Navy. |
| 21 May | Roumania | Steamship | Messrs. W. Gray & Co. | West Hartlepool | United Kingdom | For private owner. |
| 22 May | Inchmornish | Steamship | Messrs. C. Mitchell & Co. | Low Walker | United Kingdom | For Messrs. Hamilton, Frazer & Co. |
| 22 May | Macleod | full-rigged ship | Messrs. A. M'Millan & Son | Dumbarton | United Kingdom | For Mr. Macleod. |
| 23 May | Titania | Steam yacht | Messrs. Ramage & Ferguson | Leith | United Kingdom | For John Lysaght. |
| 24 May | Arranmore | Steamship | William Doxford & Sons | Sunderland | United Kingdom | For Messrs. William Johnston & Co. |
| 24 May | Chilton | Steamship | Messrs. William Gray & Co. | West Hartlepool | United Kingdom | For Messrs. T. Appleby & Co. |
| 24 May | Fair Head | Cargo ship | Harland & Wolff | Belfast | United Kingdom | For Ulster Steamship Co. |
| 24 May | Meath | Steamship | Palmer's Shipbuilding and Iron Company | Jarrow | United Kingdom | For R. M. Hudson and partners. |
| 24 May | Vasco da Gama | Steamship | W. B. Thompson | Dundee | United Kingdom | For Messrs. Robert M'Andres & Co. |
| 26 May | Alvo | Steamship | Messrs. Aitken & Mansel | Whiteinch | United Kingdom | For West India & Pacific Steamship Co. |
| 26 May | Lake Winnipeg | Steamship | Messrs. J. & G. Thompson | Clydebank | United Kingdom | For Canada Shipping Company. |
| 28 May | Lady Cardigan | Steamboat | F. T. Harker | Stockton-on-Tees, Kirkstall Abbey | United Kingdom | For William Adams. Built at Stockton-on-Tees, launched at Kirkstall Abbey. |
| 29 May | Emerald | Steamship | Messrs. Dobson & Charles | Grangemouth | United Kingdom | For James Hay. |
| May | Ancona | Steamship | | | United Kingdom | For Peninsula and Oriental Steam Navigation Company. |
| May | Nord Lyset | Fishing vessel | Messrs. Routh & Waddingham | Winteringham | United Kingdom | For Hans Mohr. |
| May | Stella | Tug | Messrs. John Softley & Sons | South Shields | United Kingdom | For private owner. |
| May | Not named | Tug | Messrs. John Softley & Sons | South Shields | United Kingdom | For private owner. |
| 3 June | Esmerelda | Steamship | Messrs. Dobson & Charles | Grangemouth | United Kingdom | For James Hay. |
| 3 June | Paxo | Steamship | James Laing | Sunderland | United Kingdom | For D. G. Pinkney & Son. |
| 4 June | Hilda | Barquentine | W. Pickard | Appledore | United Kingdom | For J. Pring. |
| 4 June | Minnie Flossie | Smack | J. L. Davies | Milford Haven | United Kingdom | For J. L. Davies. |
| Unknown date | Burry | Coaster | W. Allsup & Sons | Preston | United Kingdom | For Llanelly & Liverpool Steam Shipping Co. Ltd. |
| 5 June | Cora Maria | Steamship | Messrs. Schlesinger, Davis & Co. | Wallsend | United Kingdom | For Messrs. Capper, Alexander ^ Co. |
| 5 June | Clymene | Steamship | Messrs. M. Pearse & Co. | Stockton-on-Tees | United Kingdom | For H. Cloake. |
| 5 June | Highbury | Steamship | Tyne Iron Shipbuilding Company (Limited) | Newcastle upon Tyne | United Kingdom | For Messrs. Watts, Milburn & Co. |
| 5 June | Madrid | Steamship | Messrs. Wigham Richardson & Co. | Wallsend | United Kingdom | For Messrs. Henry Buckwall & Sons. |
| 5 June | Mildred | Steamship | Messrs. Turnbull & Sons | Whitby | United Kingdom | For private owner. |
| 5 June | Minnie | Yacht | Atkinson | Ringsend | United Kingdom | For Wilfred Fitzgerald. |
| 5 June | Orient | Steamship | John Elder and Co | Govan | United Kingdom | For Orient Steam Navigation Company. |
| 5 June | Robert Brown | Steamship | Messrs. John Readhead & Co. | South Shields | United Kingdom | For W. D. C. Balls. |
| 5 June | Woodhorn | Steamship | Messrs. C. S. Swan & Co | Low Walker | United Kingdom | For G. R. Dawson and partners. |
| 6 June | Jessie | Barquentine | William Pickersgill | Sunderland | United Kingdom | For J. & J. Denholm. |
| 6 June | Lady Elizabeth | Barque | Robert Thompson Jr. | Sunderland | United Kingdom | For John Wilson. |
| 6 June | Rotomahana | Steamship | Messrs. William Denny & Bros. | Dumbarton | United Kingdom | For Union Steamship Company of New Zealand. |
| 7 June | Earl of Jersey | Steamship | Messrs. Palmer's | Jarrow | United Kingdom | For Messrs. Martin & Marquande. |
| 7 June | Otto M'Combie | Steamship | Caledon Shipyard | Dundee | United Kingdom | For Messrs. James M'Combie & Co. |
| 7 June | Romulus | Steamship | Messrs. H. M'Intyre & Co. | Merksworth | United Kingdom | For private owner. |
| 9 June | Oxton | Ferry | Messrs. W. Simons & Co. | Renfrew | United Kingdom | For Birkenhead Commissioners. |
| 14 June | John M'Connochie | Paddle tug | Messrs. Elliott & Jeffreys | Cardiff | United Kingdom | For private owner. |
| 9 June | Walkyrie | Steamship | Messrs. John Reid & Co.l | Port Glasgow | United Kingdom | For Thomas Barclay. |
| 16 June | Norfolk | Paddle Steamer | Messrs. R. & H. Green | Blackwall | United Kingdom | For Sproston Dock and Foundry Co. |
| 18 June | Adirondack | Steamship | Messrs. C. Mitchell & Co. | Low Walker | United Kingdom | For private owner |
| 18 June | Puchoco | Steamship | Messrs. Gourlay Bros. & Co. | Dundee | United Kingdom | For Pacific Steam Navigation Company. |
| 19 June | Halo | Steamship | Messrs. E. Withy & Co. | Middleton | United Kingdom | For George Horsley. |
| 19 June | Navigation | Steamship | Palmer's Shipbuilding and Iron Company | Jarrow | United Kingdom | For Messrs. Dixon & Harris. |
| 19 June | Seeker | Schooner | John Stephens | Devoran | United Kingdom | For John Stephens. |
| 20 June | Janie Gough | Barquentine | Mr. Rodgers | Carrickfergus | United Kingdom | For Messrs. Samuel Gough & Co. |
| 21 June | Foscolia | Steamship | Messrs. Charles Mitchell & Co. | Low Walker | United Kingdom | For Messrs. Watts, Milburn & Co. |
| 21 June | Lartington | Steamship | Short Bros. | Pallion | United Kingdom | For J. S. Barwick. |
| 21 June | Rosalind | Steamship | Tyne Iron Shipbuilding Co | Willington Quay, England | United Kingdom | For C. F. Jackson & Co. |
| 24 June | Comus | Barque | Messrs. Charles Connell & Co. | Scotstoun | United Kingdom | For Messrs. Barton & Co. |
| 24 June | Lifeguard | Steamship | Messrs. A. & J. Inglis | Pointhouse | United Kingdom | For Sir James M'Garel-Hogg. |
| June | Fortuna | Humber Keel | William Hoggard | Barton-upon-Humber | United Kingdom | For Messrs. John & Samuel Barraclough. |
| June | Galgorm Castle | Cargo ship | Harland & Wolff | Belfast | United Kingdom | For A. McMullan. |
| 1 July | Arbutus | Lighthouse tender | Malster & Reaney | Canton, Maryland | United States | For United States Lighthouse Board. |
| 1 July | Polly | Tug | Campbeltown Shipbuilding Co. | Campbeltown | United Kingdom | For Messrs. M'Eacharn, M'Ilwraitn & Co. |
| 3 July | Aha | Steam yacht | Messrs. H. M'Intyre & Co. | Paisley | United Kingdom | For Mr. Sadler. |
| 3 July | Barao-Desdiogo | Steamship | Messrs. C. Mitchell & Co. | Low Walker | United Kingdom | For Macachè and Campos Railway Co. |
| 3 July | Mary Louise | Paddle Tug | J. P. Rennoldson | location | United Kingdom | For James Wardle. |
| 3 July | Scotia | Steamship | Messrs. Raylton, Dixon & Co. | Middlesbrough | United Kingdom | For J. M. Lennard. |
| 5 July | Castleton | Steamship | Messrs. Schlesinger, Davis & Co. | Wallsend | United Kingdom | For Messrs. Cope. |
| 5 July | M. A. Wilkinson | Schooner | Robert Cook | Appledore | United Kingdom | For R. Wilkinson and others. |
| 5 July | Morea | Steamship | Messrs. William Gray & Co. | West Hartlepool | United Kingdom | For Messrs. Taylor, Cameron & Co. |
| 5 July | Primrose | Paddle ferry | Messrs. T. B. Seath & Co. | Rutherglen | United Kingdom | For Wallasey Local Board. |
| 7 July | Carthagena | Steamship | Messrs. Bartram, Haswell & Co. | Sunderland | United Kingdom | For W. M'Murray. |
| 7 July | Eagle | Steam yacht | Messrs. Scott & Co. | Cartsdyke | United Kingdom | For Count Stackelberg. |
| 9 July | Claudius | Steamship | Messrs. Alexander Stephen & Sons | Linthouse | United Kingdom | For C. Anderson. |
| 9 July | Pongola | Steamship | Messrs. M'Millan & Son | Dumbarton | United Kingdom | For Messrs. Bullard, King & Co. |
| 17 July | Mary and Helen | Whaler | Goss, Sawyer & Packard | Bath, Maine | United States | For William Lewis. |
| 17 July | Presto | Steamship | Messrs. C. Mitchell & Co. | Low Walker | United Kingdom | For R. B. Pelton & Joseph Reay. |
| 19 July | Potaro | Steamship | Messrs. Edward Withy & Co. | Middleton | United Kingdom | For Messrs. Steel, Young & Co. |
| 19 July | Rebecca | Steamship | Palmer's Company | Jarrow | United Kingdom | For Messrs. Joseph F. Cohen and others. |
| 21 July | Cid | Steamship | Messrs. M. Pearse & Co. | Stockton-on-Tees | United Kingdom | For R. J. Kay. |
| 21 July | Snaresbrook | Steamship | Messrs. W. Gray & Co. | West Hartlepool | United Kingdom | For Benjamin Pearson. |
| 22 July | Benona | Steamship | Whitehaven Shipbuilding Company | Whitehaven | United Kingdom | For Joseph Holt. |
| 22 July | Bristol City | Steamship | Messrs. Richardson, Duck & Co. | South Stockton-on-Tees | United Kingdom | For Messrs. Charles Hill & Sons. |
| 23 July | Comeragh | Steamship | London and Glasgow Shipbuilding Co. | Glasgow | United Kingdom | For private owner. |
| 26 July | Not named | Steamboat | Gabriel Davis Jr. | Abingdon | United Kingdom | For Thames and Isis Steamboat Co. |
| 31 July | Aragón | Aragon-class cruiser | Arsenal de Cartagena | Cartagena | Spain | For Spanish Navy. |
| July | Ralph Creyke | Steamship | Short Bros. | Sunderland | United Kingdom | For Goole Steam Shipping Company. |
| 2 August | British Crown | Passenger ship | Harland & Wolff | Belfast | United Kingdom | For British Shipowners Ltd. |
| 2 August | Daisy | Paddle ferry | Messrs. T. B. Seath & Co. | Rutherglen | United Kingdom | For Wallasey Local Board. |
| 2 August | Eden | Steamship | Messrs. William Gray & Co. | West Hartlepool | United Kingdom | For Messrs. Ropner & Co. |
| 2 August | Laurium | Steamship | Messrs. Schlesinger, Davis & Co. | Wallsend-on-Tyne | United Kingdom | For Messrs. Poingdestre & Mesnier. |
| 2 August | Leo | Steamship | Messrs. C. S. Swan & Co. | Wallsend | United Kingdom | For R. B. Avery. |
| 2 August | Lucy | Barquentine | Messrs. W. Bayley & Son | Ipswich | United Kingdom | For Messrs. Woodhead & Co. |
| 2 August | Sophocles | Clipper | Messrs. Walter Hood & Co. | Aberdeen | United Kingdom | For Messrs. George Thompson & Co. |
| 4 August | Tweed | Schooner | James Roney | location | United Kingdom | For James C. King. |
| 5 August | Pizarro | Steamship | Messrs. Robert Napier & Sons | Glasgow | United Kingdom | For Pacific Steam Navigation Company. |
| 5 August | Pouyer-Quertier | Cable ship | Messrs. C. Mitchell & Co. | Low Walker | United Kingdom | For Messrs. Siemens & Halske. |
| 6 August | Cromartyshire | Full-rigged ship | Russell & Co. | Port Glasgow | United Kingdom | For Thomas Law & Co. |
| 6 August | Fountain's Abbey | Steamship | Messrs. Palmer & Co. | Jarrow-on-Tyne | United Kingdom | For Messrs. Pyman, Watson & Co. |
| 6 August | Mountjoy | Steam hopper barge | Messrs. W. Simons & Co. | Renfrew | United Kingdom | For Londonderry Harbour Commissioners. |
| 7 August | Ganymede | Steamship | John Scott & Co. | Greenock | United Kingdom | For Alfred Holt. |
| 9 August | Arménie | Steamship | Forges et Chantiers de la Méditerranée | La Seyne | France | For N. Paquet aine et Cie. |
| 9 August | Strelok | Kreiser-class frigate | | Saint Petersburg | Russia | For Imperial Russian Navy. |
| 9 August | Steam Dredger | Dredger | Messrs. Osbourne, Graham & Co. | Hylton-on-the-Wear | United Kingdom | For Indian Government. |
| 16 August | Crane | Steamship | Joseph L. Thompson | Sunderland | United Kingdom | For Dent & Co. |
| 16 August | Dalbeattie | Steamship | Messrs. Raylton Dixon & Co | Middlesbrough | United Kingdom | For Messrs. Edward Harris & Co. |
| 16 August | Mandovi | Gunvessel | Messrs. Laird Bros. | Birkenhead | United Kingdom | For Portuguese Navy. |
| 18 August | Cumbriana | Barque | Messrs. R. Williamson & Son | Harrington | United Kingdom | For private owner. |
| 18 August | New York City | Steamship | Messrs. Richardson, Duck & Co. | South Stockton-on-Tees | United Kingdom | For Messrs. Charles Hill & Sons. |
| 18 August | Norah | Steamship | Messrs. M. Pearse & Co. | Stockton-on-Tees | United Kingdom | For private owner. |
| 19 August | Beta | Steamship | Messrs. John Readhead & Sons | South Shields | United Kingdom | For Messrs. Wilson, Taylor & Partners. |
| 19 August | Dévastation | Dévastation-class ironclad | Arsenal de Lorient | Lorient | France | For French Navy. |
| 19 August | Marengo | Steamship | Earle's Shipbuilding | Hull | United Kingdom | For Messrs. Thomas Wilson, Sons & Co. |
| 19 August | Rhyl | Steamship | Messrs. Palmer's | Jarrow | United Kingdom | For Messrs. John Cory & Sons. |
| 19 August | Ulster | Barquentine | Messrs. A. M'Laine & Sons | Belfast | United Kingdom | For private owner. |
| 20 August | Gardenia | Steamship | Tyne Iron Shipbuilding Company | Willington Quay | United Kingdom | For Messrs. Joseph Robinson & Co. |
| 20 August | Guadiana | Steamship | Thames Ironworks and Shipbuilding Company | Blackwall | United Kingdom | For Portuguese Government. |
| 20 August | Kate | Steamship | Messrs. Turnbull & Sons | Whitby | United Kingdom | For Messrs. James Gray & Co. |
| 20 August | Longhurst | Steamship | Messrs. Wigham, Richardson & Co. | Walker-on-the-Tyne | United Kingdom | For Messrs. Elliott, Lowrie & Dunford. |
| 20 August | Vega | Steamship | Messrs. A. Leslie & Co. | Hebburn | United Kingdom | For Star Line. |
| 21 August | Britannia | Steamship | Messrs. D. & W. Henderson | Kelvin | United Kingdom | For Anchor Line. |
| 21 August | Villars | Villars-class cruiser | Arsenal de Cherbourg | Cherbourg | France | For French Navy. |
| 23 August | Bengo | Gunvessel | Messrs. Laird Bros. | Birkenhead | United Kingdom | For Portuguese Navy. |
| 23 August | Vigilant | Pilot boat | Yacht and Shipbuilding Co. | Harwich | United Kingdom | For Trinity House. |
| 29 August | Queen Mary | Steam yacht | Messrs. Alexander Hall & Co. | Footdee | United Kingdom | For John Gladstone Mackie. |
| 30 August | Spalato | Zara class cruiser | Stabilimento Tecnico Triestino | Trieste | Austria-Hungary | For Austro-Hungarian Navy. |
| 1 September | Gannet | Steamship | Messrs. M. Pearse & Co. | Stockton-on-Tees | United Kingdom | For General Steam Navigation Company. |
| 1 September | Gracie | Steamship | Messrs. Edward Withy & Co. | Middleton | United Kingdom | For Messrs. Stephenson, Clarke & Co. |
| 1 September | Zoe | Steamship | Palmer's Shipbuilding and Iron Co. | Jarrow | United Kingdom | For Messrs. Burdick & Cook. |
| 2 September | Discovery | Smack | George W. Brown & Sons | Hull | United Kingdom | For William J. Robins. |
| 2 September | Beatrice | Steamship | Messrs. Turnbull & Sons | Whitby | United Kingdom | For private owner. |
| 2 September | Lambeth | Collier | Palmer's Shipbuilding and Iron Company (Limited) | Jarrow | United Kingdom | For Messrs. Nicholls & Co. |
| 3 September | Saint Dominique | Steamship | Forges et Chantiers de la Méditerranée | Le Havre | France | For Cie. Générale Transatlantique |
| 3 September | Calvilla | Steamship | Joseph L. Thompson | Sunderland | United Kingdom | For Thomas E. Hick & Co. |
| 3 September | Hartville | Steamship | Messrs. William Gray & Co. | West Hartlepool | United Kingdom | For Messrs. Groves, Maclean & Co. |
| 4 September | Gneisenau | Bismarck-class corvette | Kaiserliche Werft | Danzig | Germany | For Kaiserliche Marine |
| 4 September | Hanlan | Paddle Tug | Messrs. Softley & Sons | South Shields | United Kingdom | For private owners. |
| 6 September | George | Tug | Messrs. Woodhaye & Johnston | South Shields | United Kingdom | For C. Compothega. |
| 6 September | Sindi | Steam Hopper barge | Mounsey & Foster | North Hylton | United Kingdom | For Indian Government. |
| 11 September | Amiral Duperré | Ironclad | Forges et Chantiers de la Méditerranée | La Seyne-sur-Mer | France | For French Navy. |
| 11 September | Baluchi | Steam hopper barge | Messrs. Osbourne, Graham & Co. | North Hylton | United Kingdom | For Indian Government. |
| 13 September | Sunflower | Paddle steamer | Messrs. T. B. Seath & Co. | Rutherglen | United Kingdom | For Wallasey Local Board. |
| 15 September | Stein | Bismarck-class corvette | Vulcan AG | Stettin | Germany | For Kaiserliche Marine. |
| 15 September | Gripper | Gadfly-class gunboat | Pembroke Dock | Pembrokeshire, Wales | United Kingdom | For Royal Navy. |
| 15 September | Tickler | Gadfly-class gunboat | Pembroke Dock | Pembrokeshire, Wales | United Kingdom | For Royal Navy. |
| 16 September | Phoenix | Doterel-class sloop | Devonport Dockyard | Devonport, Devon | United Kingdom | For Royal Navy. |
| 16 September | Success | Steam lighter | Messrs. Briggs & Co. | Rotherhithe | United Kingdom | For private owner. |
| 16 September | William of Riga | Steamship | Campbeltown Shipbuilding Co. | Campbeltown | United Kingdom | For private owner. |
| 17 September | Agamemnon | Ajax-class ironclad | Chatham Dockyard | Chatham, Kent | United Kingdom | For Royal Navy. |
| 17 September | Iowa | Steamship | Messrs. R. & J. Evans & Co. | Liverpool | United Kingdom | For Messrs. G. Warren & Co. |
| 17 September | Mabel | Steamship | Messrs. W. Gray & Co. | West Hartlepool | United Kingdom | For Messrs. Coverdale, Todd & Co. |
| 17 September | Mendoza | Steamship | Messrs. R. Napier & Sons | Glasgow | United Kingdom | For Pacific Steam Navigation Company. |
| 17 September | Norman | Steamship | Messrs. C. Mitchell & Co. | Newcastle upon Tyne | United Kingdom | For private owner. |
| 17 September | Plantyn | Steamship | Messrs. Alexander Stephen & Sons | Govan | United Kingdom | For Messrs. T. C. Engels & Co. |
| 18 September | Montreal | Steamship | Messrs. Charles Connell & Co. | Scotstoun | United Kingdom | For Mississippi & Dominion Steamship Company (Limited). |
| 18 September | Not named | Tug | Messrs. Softley & Sons | South Shields | United Kingdom | For Messrs. Pile & Co. |
| 17 September | Flamsteed | Steamship | Bartram, Haswell & Co. | Sunderland | United Kingdom | For Wilkie & Turnbull. |
| 19 September | Crocodill | Gunboat | | Bremen | Germany | For Kaiserliche Marine. |
| 20 September | Lady Margaret | Tug | Messrs. E. Finch & Co. | Chepstow | United Kingdom | For Messrs. Styles & de Boisdeval. |
| 21 September | Excelsior | Sailing barge | John Taylor | Harwich | United Kingdom | For George Green & Co. |
| 22 September | Hong Ann | Steamship | Messrs. Wigham, Richardson & Co. | Low Walker | United Kingdom | For private owner. |
| 29 September | Beignon | Steamship | Palmer's Shipbuilding and Iron Company | Jarrow | United Kingdom | For Messrs. Morel Bros. & Co. |
| 30 September | Aludra | Steamship | Mounsey & Foster | Sunderland | United Kingdom | For R. H. Penney. |
| 30 September | Cumbrian | Barque | Robert Thompson Jr. | Sunderland | United Kingdom | For Peter Iredale & Co. |
| 30 September | Miranda | Doterel-class sloop | | Devonport Dockyard | United Kingdom | For Royal Navy. |
| 30 September | Unnamed | Dredger | Messrs. W. Simons & Co. | Renfrew | United Kingdom | For Hull Corporation. |
| September | Australian | Steamship | Messrs. Gourlay Bros. | Dundee | United Kingdom | For Messrs. G. & B. Nicoll. |
| September | Sunflower | Paddle luggage boat | T. B. Seath & Co. | Rutherglen | United Kingdom | For Wallasey Local Boatd. |
| 1 October | Argosy | Steamship | Messrs. M. Pearse & Co. | Stockton-on-Tees | United Kingdom | For Messrs. Hodgson & Eccles. |
| 1 October | Lord Dufferin | Sailing ship | Harland & Wolff | Belfast | United Kingdom | For Thomas Dixon & Co. |
| 1 October | Mary Monica | Steamship | Messrs. Murdoch & Murray | Port Glasgow | United Kingdom | For Messrs. J. & J. Young. |
| 1 October | M. E. Johnson | Schooner | William Ashburner | Barrow-in-Furness | United Kingdom | For Thomas Ashburner. |
| 1 October | Spinaway | Fishing smack | Messrs. Cottingham Bros. | Goole | United Kingdom | For C. Pickering. |
| 1 October | Ardington | Steamship | Palmer's Shipbuilding and Iron Co. | Jarrow | United Kingdom | For Messrs. Lee, Finch & Co. |
| 2 October | Buenos Ayrean | Steamship | William Denny and Brothers Ltd | Dumbarton | United Kingdom | For Messrs. James and Alexander Allan. |
| 2 October | Gleadowe | Steamship | Palmers Shipbuilding and Iron Co. | Jarrow | United Kingdom | For Messrs. Hunting and Pattison. |
| 2 October | M'Millan | Merchantman | Messrs. A. M'Millan & Son | Dumbarton | United Kingdom | For private owner. |
| 2 October | Silver Cloud | Merchantman | Mr. Robinson | Ipswich | United Kingdom | For Messrs. J. G. Morton. |
| 4 October | Harold Roper | Steamship | Osbourne, Graham & Co. | North Hylton | United Kingdom | For E. Beale. |
| 6 October | Dannebrog | Royal yacht | | Copenhagen | Denmark | For Christian IX. |
| 8 October | Habicht | Gunboat | | Elbing | Germany | For Kaiserliche Marine. |
| 14 October | Annie | Humber Keel | George Brown | Hull | United Kingdom | For George Jackson & Sons. |
| 14 October | Malaga | Steamship | Messrs. Alexander Stephen & Sons | Linthouse | United Kingdom | For Messrs. Robert M. Sloman & Co. |
| 14 October | Wolviston | Steamship | Messrs. W. Gray & Co. | West Hartlepool | United Kingdom | For West Hartlepool Steam Navigation Company. |
| 15 October | Ballogie | Steamship | Messrs. Hall, Russell & Co. | Aberdeen | United Kingdom | For Messrs. J. & A. Davidson. |
| 16 October | Belair | Steamship | Messrs. J. & G. Thompson | Greenock | United Kingdom | For Messrs. David Caw & Co. |
| 16 October | Cleveland | Steamship | Messrs. Craggs & Son | Middlesbrough | United Kingdom | For Messrs. Jervelund & Clepham. |
| 16 October | Colina | Steamship | Messrs. Robert Irvine & Co. | West Hartlepool | United Kingdom | For Rober Irvine & Co. |
| 16 October | Derwent | Steamship | Robert Thompson Jr. | Sunderland | United Kingdom | For Royal Mail Line. |
| 16 October | D'Estaing | Lapérouse-class cruiser | Arsenal de Brest | Brest, France | France | For French Navy. |
| 16 October | Grecian | Steamship | William Doxford & Sons | Sunderland | United Kingdom | For Allan Line. |
| 16 October | Maxima | Steamship | William Doxford & Sons | Pallion | United Kingdom | For private owner. |
| 16 October | Turenne | Bayard-class ironclad | Arsenal de Lorient | Lorient | France | For French Navy. |
| 16 October | Viola | Steamship | Tyne Iron Shipbuilding Company (Limited) | Howdon | United Kingdom | For Messrs. Joseph Robinson & Co. |
| 17 October | Cosmos | Paddle steamer | Messrs. A. & J. Inglis | PoinSthouse | United Kingdom | For private owner. |
| 17 October | Hawendale | Coaster | T. T. Parry | Bangor | United Kingdom | For Mr. Preston. |
| 22 October | Mayo | Steamship | Messrs. Oswald Mordaunt & Co. | Southampton | United Kingdom | For C. W. Pollexfen. |
| 30 October | Glenrath | Steamship | Palmer's Shipbuilding and Iron Company (Limited) | Jarrow | United Kingdom | For Messrs. Lindsay, Gracie & Co. |
| 30 October | Mary | Steamship | Messrs. John Readhead & Co. | South Shields | United Kingdom | For Messrs. R. Harrowing & Co. |
| 30 October | Petriana | Cargo ship | A. Leslie and Company | Newcastle upon Tyne | United Kingdom | For Bell & Symonds. |
| 30 October | Unnamed | Barge | R. R. Smellie & Co | Brisbane | Queensland | For Queensland Government. |
| 31 October | Coraki | Steamship | W. B. Thompson | Dundee | United Kingdom | For Clarence and Richmond River Steam Navigation Co. |
| 1 November | Concert | Dandy | J. C. Tolman | Newhaven | United Kingdom | For R. Hillyard. |
| 3 November | Enchantress | Steamship | Short Bros. | Pallion | United Kingdom | For Taylor & Sanderson. |
| 3 November | Kinfauns Castle | Steamship | John Elder & Co. | Govan | United Kingdom | For D. Currie. |
| 3 November | Queen | Cutter | John F. Picot | Jersey | Jersey | For Mr. Guille. |
| 3 November | Te Anau | Steamship | Messrs. William Denny & Bros. | Dumbarton | United Kingdom | For Union Steamship Company of New Zealand (Limited). |
| 5 November | Cipero | Steamship | Messrs. J. & G. Thompson | Clydebank | United Kingdom | For Messrs. David Caw & Co. |
| 5 November | Holmhurst | Cargo ship | Harland & Wolff | Belfast | United Kingdom | For J. H. Thursley & Co. |
| 12 November | Europa | Steamship | Messrs. Charles Mitchell & Co. | Low Walker | United Kingdom | For Edward Carr. |
| 12 November | Mobile | Steamship | Messrs. Alexander Stephen & Sons | Linthouse | United Kingdom | For Gulf City Steamship Company (Limited). |
| 12 November | Pilot | Training ship | | Pembroke Dockyard | United Kingdom | For Royal Navy. |
| 13 November | Grandtully Castle | Steamship | Messrs. Barclay, Curle & Co. | Whiteinch | United Kingdom | For Messrs. Donald Currie & Co. |
| 13 November | Zara | Zara class cruiser | | Pola | Austria-Hungary | For Austro-Hungarian Navy. |
| 14 November | Mouette | Flotilla aviso | Forges et Chantiers de la Méditerranée | La Seyne | France | For French Navy |
| 15 November | Amerique | Steamship | Messrs. A. M'Millan & Son | Dumbarto | United Kingdom | For Nouvelle Société Maritime de Navigation à Vapeur (Compagnie Fraissinet). |
| 15 November | Colombia | Schooner | C. & R. Poillon | Brooklyn, New York | United States | For Augustus Van Pelt and others. |
| 15 November | Mars | Training ship | Kaiserliche Werft | Wilhelmshaven | Germany | For Kaiserliche Marine. |
| 15 November | Paragon | Schooner | Messrs. Stephen & Forbes | Peterhead | United Kingdom | For private owner. |
| 18 November | Athos | Steamship | Messrs. Charles Connell & Co. | Scotstoun | United Kingdom | For Atlas Steamship Co. |
| 18 November | Heather Bell | Steamship | Messrs. Barr & Shearer | Ardrossan | United Kingdom | For Messrs. Boustead & Dunbar. |
| 26 November | Resurgam | Submarine | Cochran & Co. | Birkenhead | United Kingdom | For George Garrett. |
| 27 November | Rhiwabon | Steamship | Palmer's Iron and Shipbuilding Company | Jarrow | United Kingdom | For Messrs. J. Cory & Sons. |
| 29 November | Barcelona | Steamship | Messrs. Alexander Stephen & Sons | Linthouse | United Kingdom | For Messrs. Robert M. Sloman & Co. |
| 29 November | Jose Perez | Steamship | Robert Chambers Jr. | Dumbarton | United Kingdom | For Nicosio Perez. |
| 30 November | Sparkling Glance | Yorkshire Billyboy | John Banks Jr. | Kilpin Pike | United Kingdom | For William Banks. |
| November | Abeille | Tug | Messrs. Cunliffe & Dunlop | Greenock | United Kingdom | For MM Walter et Cie. |
| November | Jamestown | Merchantman | | Richmond, Maine | United States | For James M. Hagar. |
| November | Mokta | Steamship | Messrs. Schlesinger, Davis & Co. | Wallsend-on-Tyne | United Kingdom | For Messrs. Poingdestgre & Mesnier. |
| November | Peebleshire | Barque | Messrs. Russell & Co. | Port Glasgow | United Kingdom | For Messrs. Thomas Law & Co. |
| November | Wiehr | Gunboat | | Saint Petersburg | Russia | For Imperial Russian Navy. |
| 2 December | Laertes | Steamship | Messrs. Scott & Co. | Cartsdyke | United Kingdom | For Ocean Steamship Co. |
| 9 December | Dubrovnik | Steamship | Messrs. A. M'Millan & Son | Dumbarton | United Kingdom | For Ragusa Steamship Co. |
| 11 December | Carolina | Steamship | Edward Withy & Co. | Middleton | United Kingdom | For Messrs. Scott Bros. |
| 11 December | Villarino | Steamship | Messrs. Laird Bros. | Birkenhead | United Kingdom | For Argentine Government. |
| 13 December | Devonia | Steamship | Palmer's Shipbuilding and Iron Company (Limited) | Jarrow | United Kingdom | For Messrs. J. & R. Borey. |
| 13 December | Edmonton | Steamship | Messrs. C. S. Swan & Co. | Wallsend | United Kingdom | For Messrs. Watts, Ward & Co. |
| 13 December | Fish Hawk | Research ship | Pusey and Jones | Wilmington, Delaware | United States | For United States Fish Commission. |
| 13 December | Irish Minstrel | Schooner | John Connick | Dundalk | United Kingdom | For private owner. |
| 13 December | Jane | Steamship | Messrs. T. Turnbull & Sons | Whitby | United Kingdom | For private owner. |
| 13 December | Morven | Steamship | Messrs. E. Withy & Co. | Middleton | United Kingdom | For Messrs. James Gardner & Co. |
| 13 December | Resolute | Paddle steamer | J. T. Eltringham | South Shields | United Kingdom | For Waterford Steam Shipping Co. (Limited). |
| 13 December | Skylight | Steamship | Messrs. Scott & M'Gill | Bowling | United Kingdom | For Messrs. Ross & Marshall. |
| 13 December | Storebett | Steamship | Messrs. Lobnitz, Coulborn & Co. | Renfrew | United Kingdom | For Llands Engelshe Damskibsskelskab. |
| 13 December | Tisza | Steamship | Messrs. Blackwood & Gordon | Port Glasgow | United Kingdom | For Messrs. Burrell & Sons. |
| 15 December | Africa | Steamship | Messrs. Alexander Stephen & Sons | Linthouse | United Kingdom | For Edward Carr. |
| 15 December | Romanche | Allier-class transport | Chantiers et Ateliers Augustin Normand | Le Havre | France | For French Navy |
| 15 December | Alpha | Steamship | W. Simons & Co. | Renfrew | United Kingdom | For Liverpool Corporation. |
| 15 December | Arandhu | Steamship | Messrs. H. Murray & Co. | Port Glasgow | United Kingdom | For Messrs. M'Laren, Crumm & Co. |
| 15 December | Athernie Castle | Barque | Messrs. Alexander Stephen & Sons | Dundee | United Kingdom | For private owner. |
| 15 December | Unnamed | Steamship | Messrs. S. P. Austin & Hunter | Sunderland | United Kingdom | For private owner. |
| 16 December | Kingfisher | Doterel-class sloop | | Sheerness Dockyard | United Kingdom | For Royal Navy. |
| 17 December | Amsterdam | Steamship | Messrs. Archibald M'Millan & Sons | Dumbarton | United Kingdom | For Koninklijke Nederlandse Stoomboot-Maatschappij. |
| 19 December | Lizzie | Cutter | Campbeltown Shipbuilding Co. | Campbeltown | United Kingdom | For J. B. Lindsay. |
| 20 December | Satellite | Steamship | Messrs. A. Hall & Co. | Footdee | United Kingdom | For Atlas Steam Shipping Co. |
| 22 December | Bellver | Steamship | Messrs. James & George Thompson | Clydebank | United Kingdom | For Sr. Bauls. |
| 22 December | Nora | Steam yacht | Messrs. C. Mitchell & Co | Walker | United Kingdom | For M. Perret. |
| 29 December | Billiton | Steamship | Messrs. Blackwood & Gordon | Port Glasgow | United Kingdom | For Messrs. Adam, Gilfillan & Co. |
| 29 December | Resolute | Whaler | Messrs. Alexander Stephen & Sons | | United Kingdom | For Dundee Seal and Whale Fishing Company. |
| December | Liverpool | Steamship | Messrs. William Simons & Co. | Renfrew | United Kingdom | For Liverpool Corporation. |
| Autumnn | Freiherr von Stein | Frigate | | Stettin | Germany | For Kaiserliche Marine. |
| Unknown date | Abana | Steamship | Messrs. M. Pearse & Co. | Stockton-on-Tees | United Kingdom | For private owner. |
| Unknown date | Active | Steamship | James Laing | Sunderland | United Kingdom | For Active Steamship Co. |
| Unknown date | Adelaide | Schooner | | Pyrmont, New South Wales | New South Wales | For Chapman Bonner Bond. |
| Unknown date | Alava | Merchantman | William Doxford & Sons | Sunderland | United Kingdom | For Olano, Larrinaga & Co. |
| Unknown date | Aline Woermann | Steamship | Reiherstieg Schiffswerfte & Maschinenfabrik | Hamburg | Germany | For Carl Woermann. |
| Unknown date | Amagansett | Fishing trawler | | Kennebunk, Maine | United States | For private owner. |
| Unknown date | Amazonese | Steamship | Messrs. Oswald, Mordaunt & Co. | Southampton | United Kingdom | For Messrs. R. Singlehurst & Co. |
| Unknown date | Ambient | Merchantman | Short Bros. | Sunderland | United Kingdom | For James Westoll. |
| Unknown date | Amoor | Steamship | Messrs. C. S. Swan & Co. | Wallsend | United Kingdom | For Mercantile Steamship Co. |
| Unknown date | Amy | Steam yacht | | | United Kingdom | For Lord Alfred Paget. |
| Unknown date | Aray | Torpedo boat | Hereshof Shipyard; Manuel de la Barrera | Bristol, Rhode Island, Panama City | United States, United States of Colombia | For Peruvian Navy. Built at Bristol; dismantled and shipped to Panama City. Re-erected there. |
| Unknown date | Ashbrooke | Steamship | Mounsey & Foster | Sunderland | United Kingdom | For T. G. Greenwell. |
| Unknown date | Avenger | Full-rigged ship | Whitehaven Iron Shipbuilding Company | Whitehaven | United Kingdom | For Messrs. Grice. |
| Unknown date | Azalea | Fishing trawler | Edwin Barter | Brixham | United Kingdom | For George C. Jordain. |
| Unknown date | Bagieda | Steamship | Messrs. Thomas Brassey & Co. | River Mersey | United Kingdom | For Messrs. A. & M. Hershell. |
| Unknown date | Belgenland | Steamship | Barrow Shipbuilding Company | Barrow-in-Furness | United Kingdom | For Red Star Line. |
| Unknown date | Bedale | Steamship | Messrs. John Readhead & Sons | South Shields | United Kingdom | For Messrs. Pantland Hick & Co. |
| Unknown date | Berlin | Steamship | W. B. Thompson | Dundee | United Kingdom | For Yorkshire Coal and Steamship Company. |
| Unknown date | Ben Cruachan | Merchantman | James Laing | Sunderland | United Kingdom | For J. Morrison & Son. |
| Unknown date | Bickerstaffe | Paddle steamer | Messrs. Laird Bros. | Birkenhead | United Kingdom | For Messrs. R. & J. Bickerstaffe. |
| Unknown date | Cartagena | Merchantman | Bartram, Haswell & Co. | Sunderland | United Kingdom | For W. McMurray. |
| Unknown date | Casma | Steamship | Messrs. Laird Bros | Birkenhead | United Kingdom | For Pacific Steam Navigation Company. |
| Unknown date | Celtic Monarch | Steamship | Messrs. Wigham, Richardson & Co | Walker-on-the-Tyne | United Kingdom | For Royal Exchange Shipping Co. |
| Unknown date | Cephalonia | Steamship | Messrs. Raylton Dixon & Co. | Middlesbrough | United Kingdom | For Sr. Stathopulo. |
| Unknown date | Chala | Steamship | Messrs. Laird Bros. | Birkenhead | United Kingdom | For Pacific Steam Navigation Company. |
| Unknown date | City of Alexandria | Steamship | Delaware River Iron Ship Building and Engine Works | Chester, Pennsylvania | United States | For Alexandria Line. |
| Unknown date | City of Rochester | Steamship | Osbourne, Graham & Co. | Sunderland | United Kingdom | For William A. Watson & Co. |
| Unknown date | Conqueror | Tug | | River Clyde | United Kingdom | For Clyde Shipping Co. |
| Unknown date | Consent | Merchantman | Bartram, Haswell & Co | Sunderland | United Kingdom | For James Westoll. |
| Unknown date | Contest | Merchantman | James Laing | Sunderland | United Kingdom | For William France. |
| Unknown date | Cordova | Merchantman | Joseph L. Thompson | Sunderland | United Kingdom | For John Tully. |
| Unknown date | Crescent | Merchantman | Joseph L. Thompson | Sunderland | United Kingdom | For John H. Barry & Co. |
| Unknown date | Cygnet | Passenger ship | Barrow Ship Building Co. Ltd. | Barrow-in-Furness | United Kingdom | For Furness Railway. |
| Unknown date | Cyprus | Steamship | Short Bros. | Sunderland | United Kingdom | For Taylor & Sanderson. |
| Unknown date | Czar | Steamship | James Laing | Sunderland | United Kingdom | For William Thomson & Co. |
| Unknown date | Douro | Merchantman | James Laing | Sunderland | United Kingdom | For Culliford & Clark. |
| Unknown date | Ebro | Steamship | James Laing | Sunderland | United Kingdom | For D. G. Pinkney & Co. |
| Unknown date | Edendale | Steamship | James Laing | Sunderland | United Kingdom | For Dixon & Wilson. |
| Unknown date | Eileen | Steam yacht | Messrs. A. Leslie & Co. | Hebburn | United Kingdom | For George Robert Stephenson. |
| Unknown date | Engadine | Steamship | Palmer's Shipbuilding and Iron Company (Limited) | Jarrow | United Kingdom | For Messrs. Wilson & Co. |
| Unknown date | Epsilon | Gunboat | Sir William Armstron & Co. | Newcastle upon Tyne | United Kingdom | For Imperial Chinese Navy. |
| Unknown date | Essex | Merchantman | Osbourne, Graham & Co. | Sunderland | United Kingdom | For private owner. |
| Unknown date | Estella | Steamship | Messrs. John Readhead & Sons | South Shields | United Kingdom | For John Lewis. |
| Unknown date | Eta | Gunboat | Sir William Armstron & Co. | Newcastle upon Tyne | United Kingdom | For Imperial Chinese Navy. |
| Unknown date | Ferdinand Corvilain | Merchantman | The Strand Slipway Co. | Sunderland | United Kingdom | For F. Corvilain. |
| Unknown date | Flying Scotsman | Paddle tug | J. T. Eltringham | South Shields | United Kingdom | For Clyde Shipping Company. |
| Unknown date | Fylgia | Merchantman | Mounsey & Foster | Sunderland | United Kingdom | For . |
| Unknown date | Galena | Gunboat | | Norfolk Navy Yard | United States | For United States Navy. |
| Unknown date | Godrevy | Merchantman | James Laing | Sunderland | United Kingdom | For Lamplough & Matthews. |
| Unknown date | Guiana | Paddle steamer | Messrs. R. & H. Green | Blackwall | United Kingdom | For Sprosten Dock & Foundry. |
| Unknown date | Gustav Adolph | Barque | | Arendal | Norway | For private owner. |
| Unknown date | G. W. Ward | Steamship | Messrs. Schlesinger, Davis & Co. | Wallsend | United Kingdom | For private owner. |
| Unknown date | Harvest King | Schooner | Brundrit & Co. | Runcorn | United Kingdom | For Charles Boden. |
| Unknown date | Hawthorn | Merchantman | William Doxford & Sons | Sunderland | United Kingdom | For Hopper & Crosby. |
| Unknown date | Helena | Steam lighter | James & John Hay | Kirkintilloch | United Kingdom | For private owner. |
| Unknown date | Helenslea | Barque | Messrs. Alexander Stephen & Sons | Dundee | United Kingdom | For private owner. |
| Unknown date | Inca | Tug | J. H. Dialogue & Sons | Camden, New Jersey | United States | For private owner. |
| Unknown date | Inch Clutha | Steamship | Messrs. Mitchell & Co. | Newcastle upon Tyne | United Kingdom | For Messrs. Hamilton, Fraser & Co. |
| Unknown date | Intrepid | Merchantman | Short Bros. | Sunderland | United Kingdom | For Anderson, Horan & Co. |
| Unknown date | Isabel | Steamship | Messrs. John Readhead & Sons | South Shields | United Kingdom | For Robert Harrowing. |
| Unknown date | Isis | Cutter yacht | H. Goatley | Oxford | United Kingdom | For Mr. Penrose. |
| Unknown date | Jane Miller | Steamship | Mr. Crop | Little Current | Canada | For private owner. |
| Unknown date | J. B. Walker | Schooner | | Thomaston, Maine | United States | For private owner. |
| Unknown date | Kingfisher | Steam trawler | Messrs. D. Allan & Co. | Leith | United Kingdom | For private owner. |
| Unknown date | Lapwing | Fishing trawler | John Banks Jr. | Kilpin Pike | United Kingdom | For Charles Acaster. |
| Unknown date | Llanarthan | Steamship | | | United Kingdom | For private owner. |
| Unknown date | Lively | Tug | W. Allsup & Sons | Preston | United Kingdom | For Hull Docks Co. |
| Unknown date | Lord Derby | Fishing trawler | John Banks Jr. | Kilpin Pike | United Kingdom | For Joseph P. Challis. |
| Unknown date | Lucent | Merchantman | Bartram, Haswell & Co. | Sunderland | United Kingdom | For James Westoll. |
| Unknown date | Mangerton | Steamship | Messrs. Andrew Leslie & Co. | Hebburn | United Kingdom | For John D. Milburn. |
| Unknown date | Manuel Llaguno | Schooner | | | United States | For private owner. |
| Unknown date | Marna | Merchantman | Austen & Hunter | Sunderland | United Kingdom | For C. Salvesen & Co. |
| Unknown date | Marylee | Steamship | Messrs. Edward Withy & Co. | Middleton | United Kingdom | For private owner. |
| Unknown date | May Queen | Yacht | | Yarra River | Victoria | For R. White. |
| Unknown date | Mercedes | Merchantman | Mounsey & Foster | Sunderland | United Kingdom | For Adamson & Ronaldson. |
| Unknown date | Montana | Sternwheeler | | | United States | For private owner. |
| Unknown date | N. and E. Apter | Fishing trawler | Edwin Barter | Brixham | United Kingdom | For Nicholas J. Apter. |
| Unknown date | Nearchus | Hopper barge | Mounsey & Foster | Sunderland | United Kingdom | For private owner. |
| Unknown date | Nuevo Valencia | Steamship | Messrs. Andrew Leslie & Co. | Hebburn | United Kingdom | For private owner. |
| Unknown date | Oakhurst | Merchantman | Messrs. R. Williamson & Co. | Harrington | United Kingdom | For private owner. |
| Unknown date | O&CRR Ferry No. 2 | Ferry | | | United States | For Oregon & California Railroad. |
| Unknown date | Orton | Steamship | Messrs. W. Simons & Co. | Renfrew | United Kingdom | For Birkenhead Commissioners. |
| Unknown date | Peninsula | Merchantman | Joseph L. Thompson | Sunderland | United Kingdom | For Scholefield & Tully. |
| Unknown date | Quathlanda | Barque | Messrs. A. Hall & Co. | Aberdeen | United Kingdom | For Messrs. J. T. Rennie & Sons. |
| Unknown date | Reaper | Fishing trawler | Bell & Trolley | Grimsby | United Kingdom | For James Bishop. |
| Unknown date | R. F. Matthews | Steamship | Palmer's Shipbuilding and Iron Company (Limited) | Jarrow | United Kingdom | For Messrs. Hunting & Pattison. |
| Unknown date | Rhine | Merchantman | Robert Thompson Jr. | Sunderland | United Kingdom | For Rawson & Robinson. |
| Unknown date | Rosamund | Merchantman | William Doxford & Sons | Sunderland | United Kingdom | For R. Thompson. |
| Unknown date | Salient | Steamship | Bartram, Haswell & Co. | Sunderland | United Kingdom | For James Westoll. |
| Unknown date | Salamander | Steam yacht | Forrest & Son | River Thames | United Kingdom | For Fred Power. |
| Unknown date | Selby | Humber keel | Joseph Burton | Selby | United Kingdom | For Joseph Burton. |
| Unknown date | Solano | Paddle steamer | | Oakland, California | United States | For Central Pacific Railroad. |
| Unknown date | Swift | Linnet-class gunvessel | Thames Shipbuilding Co. | River Thames | United Kingdom | For Royal Navy. |
| Unknown date | Teal | Passenger ship | Barrow Ship Building Co. Ltd. | Barrow-in-Furness | United Kingdom | For Furness Railway. |
| Unknown date | The Sweet Little Shamrock | Steam launch | John Hurley | Bristol | United Kingdom | For private owner. |
| Unknown date | Theta | Gunboat | Sir William Armstron & Co. | Newcastle upon Tyne | United Kingdom | For Imperial Chinese Navy. |
| Unknown date | Tinonee | Steamship | Australian Steam Navigation Company | Sydney | New South Wales | For Australian Steam Navigation Company. |
| Unknown date | Tornado | Steam launch | Messrs. Halsey & Co. | Wandsworth | United Kingdom | For Mr. Louch. |
| Unknown date | Tunstall | Merchantman | Short Bros | Sunderland | United Kingdom | For J. S. Barwick. |
| Unknown date | Varna | Merchantman | James Laing | Sunderland | United Kingdom | For C. M. Norwood & Co. |
| Unknown date | Vesta | Steamship | Palmer's Shipbuilding and Iron Company (Limited) | Jarrow | United Kingdom | For Messrs. Pearson & Langnese. |
| Unknown date | Ville d'Alger | Merchantman | James Laing | Sunderland | United Kingdom | For Eugene Grosos. |
| Unknown date | Vivero | Steamship | Messrs. H. M'Intyre & Co. | Paisley, Renfrewshire | United Kingdom | For Messrs. H. E. Moss & Co. |
| Unknown date | Vril | Steam launch | John I. Thorneycroft & Company | Chiswick | United Kingdom | For private owner. |
| Unknown date | Zeta | Gunboat | Sir William Armstron & Co. | Newcastle upon Tyne | United Kingdom | For Imperial Chinese Navy. |
