= List of shipwrecks in October 1883 =

The list of shipwrecks in October 1883 includes ships sunk, foundered, grounded, or otherwise lost during October 1883.

== 1 October ==
List of shipwrecks: 1 October 1883
Ship	State	Description
Glentruim	United Kingdom	The steamship collided with the steamship Westoe (United Kingdom) off Tenedos, Ottoman Empire and was beached. Glentruim was on a voyage from Taganrog, Russia to Marseille, Bouches-du-Rhône, France.
Ottavia	Italy	The barque ran aground off Roquetas de Mar, Spain. She was on a voyage from Marseille to Senegal. She was declared a total loss.

== 2 October ==
List of shipwrecks: 2 October 1883
Ship	State	Description
Beckermet	United Kingdom	The ship was driven ashore at Sheringham, Norfolk. Her crew were rescued by rocket apparatus.
Buckinghamshire	United Kingdom	The steamship departed from South Shields, County Durham for Rangoon, Burma. No further trace, reported overdue.
Molière	France	The ship collided with the quayside at Saint-Nazaire, Loire-Inférieure and was severely damaged.

== 3 October ==
List of shipwrecks: 3 October 1883
Ship	State	Description
Aigburth	United Kingdom	The ship caught fire in the Royal Victoria Dock, London.
Aquila	Norway	The barque collided with the full-rigged ship Johanne (Norway) and sank in the Atlantic Ocean with the loss of three of her crew. Survivors were rescued by Johanne. Aquila was on a voyage from Liverpool, Lancashire, United Kingdom to Halifax, Nova Scotia, Canada.
Beau Monde	United Kingdom	The barque was driven ashore and wrecked at St. Catherine's Point, Isle of Wight. Her crew were rescued by rocket apparatus. She was on a voyage from South Shields, County Durham to Cartagena, Spain.
Danmark	Denmark	The barque ran aground on the Gunfleet Sand, in the North Sea off the coast of Essex, United Kingdom. She was on a voyage from a Baltic port to Chatham, Kent, United Kingdom. She was refloated and taken in to the Swin.

== 4 October ==
List of shipwrecks: 4 October 1883
Ship	State	Description
Alpha	United Kingdom	The brigantine was driven ashore at Cromer, Norfolk. Her crew were rescued by rocket apparatus. She was on a voyage from Sunderland, County Durham to Whitstable, Kent.
Emma	(United Kingdom of Great Britain and Ireland) Jersey	The ship was driven ashore at Wells-next-the-Sea, Norfolk. Her crew were rescued by the Wells Lifeboat. She was on a voyage from Saint-Malo, Ille-et-Vilaine, Frane to Bo'ness, Lothian.
Emmanuel	United Kingdom	The fishing lugger ran aground and sank at Dover, Kent, United Kingdom.
George and Jane	United Kingdom	The Thames barge was run down and sunk by a steamship at Gravesend, Kent.
Heimdal	Norway	The schooner collided with Iris (Sweden) off Beachy Head, Sussex, United Kingdom and was abandoned with the loss of a crew member. Survivors were rescued by Iris. Heimdal was on a voyage from Isigny-sur-Mer, Calvados, France to Fredrikstadt.
James Davidson	United States	The wooden bulk carrier was wrecked in shallow water in Lake Huron off the coast of Michigan when she struck the southeastern end of Thunder Bay Island while towing the barge Middlesex (United States) from Buffalo, New York, to Duluth, Minnesota. Her steam engine and boiler were salvaged soon afterward, and the rest of her wreck broke up and sank in about 35 feet (11 m) of water at 45.0324°N 83.192717°W.
Star	United Kingdom	The fishing trawler ran aground and sank at Hartlepool, County Durham.

== 5 October ==
List of shipwrecks: 5 October 1883
Ship	State	Description
Clan Macintosh	United Kingdom	The steamship ran aground in the Hooghly River. She was refloated.
Jane Cochrose	United Kingdom	The steamship caught fire in the River Tay nea Newburgh, Fife. She was burnt to the waterline and the crew left in the ship's boats.

== 6 October ==
List of shipwrecks: 6 October 1883
Ship	State	Description
Meraggio	Flag unknown	The steamship collided with the quayside at Saint-Nazaire, Loire-Inférieure and was severely damaged.

== 7 October ==
List of shipwrecks: 7 October 1883
Ship	State	Description
George	United Kingdom	The Mersey Flat collided with the steamship Ethel (United Kingdom) and sank in the River Mersey.
Roxburghshire	United Kingdom	The barque departed from Portland, Oregon, United States. No further trace, presumed foundered with the loss of all hands.

== 8 October ==
List of shipwrecks: 8 October 1883
Ship	State	Description
Klangteen, and Yangtze	China; United Kingdom	The steamships collided in the Yangtze and were both severely damaged. They both put in to Shanghai. Klangteen was on a voyage from Ningbo to Shanghai. Yangtze was on a voyage from Shanghai to Hong Kong.
Tramore	United Kingdom	The brigantine was driven ashore and wrecked at La Atunara, Spain with the loss of two of her crew. She was on a voyage from Livorno, Italy to Havre de Grâce, Seine-Inférieure, France.
Uniao	Portugal	The brigantine was driven ashore and wrecked at Gibraltar with the loss of two of her crew. She was on a voyage from Oran, Algeria to Faro.

== 9 October ==
List of shipwrecks: 9 October 1883
Ship	State	Description
Almora	United Kingdom	The ship ran aground in the River Thames upstream of the Coalhoue Fort, Essex. She was on a voyage from London to Colombo, Ceylon. She was refloated and resumed her voyage.
Diadem	United Kingdom	The ship was wrecked on Contrary Head, Isle of Man. Her crew were rescued.
Johan Sverdrup	Norway	The ship struck a rock and foundered. She was on a voyage from Newcastle upon Tyne, Northumberland, United Kingdom to Bergen.
Miranda	United Kingdom	The steamship collided with the steamship Golea (Spain) and sank at Maasluis, South Holland, Netherlands. Miranda was on a voyage from Kronstadt, Russia to Rotterdam, South Holland.
Strathdon	United Kingdom	The steamship ran ashore on the Cannon Rock, near Kearney's Point, County Down in dense fog. Her crew were rescued. She was on a voyage from Abergele, north Wales, to Glasgow, Renfrewshire with limestone. Later broke up and sank.
William Hinde	United Kingdom	The steamship ran aground on the Middle Spit Bank, in the Bristol Channel. She was on a voyage from Pembrey, Carmarthenshire to Cardiff, Glamorgan. She was refloated and resumed her voyage.

== 10 October ==
List of shipwrecks: 10 October 1883
Ship	State	Description
Amphitrite	Flag unknown	The ship ran aground at Malmö, Sweden.
Devonia	United Kingdom	The steamship ran aground in the Clyde upstream of Port Glasgow, Renfrewshire.
Trinidad	United Kingdom	The full-rigged ship departed from Java, Netherlands East Indies for Greenock, Renfrewshire. No further trace, presumed foundered with the loss of all hands.

== 12 October ==
List of shipwrecks: 12 October 1883
Ship	State	Description
Fanny S	Flag unknown	The ship was wrecked at the mouth of the Guadiana with the loss of all but two of her crew. She was on a voyage from Marseille, Bouches-du-Rhône, France to the west coast of Africa.

== 13 October ==
List of shipwrecks: 13 October 1883
Ship	State	Description
Auguste Léontine	France	The sloop ran aground in the Risle.
Aurora	Norway	The ship departed from Sunderland, County Durham, United Kingdom for Holmstadt. No further trace, reported missing.
Lady Eglington	United Kingdom	The steamship ran aground in the River Liffey. She was on a voyage from London to Dublin.
Louise	United Kingdom	The schooner ran aground in the Risle.
Secret	United Kingdom	The Humber Keel foundered in the Humber off Reed Island. Her crew were rescued. She was on a voyage from Goole to Hull, Yorkshire.

== 14 October ==
List of shipwrecks: 14 October 1883
Ship	State	Description
Burns	United Kingdom	The steamship was lost off "Sunkin". Her crew were rescued. She was on a voyage from Bussorah, Persia to London.
Meta	Germany	The full-rigged ship was wrecked about 250 yards (229 m) off Mantoloking, New Jersey, United States. Her 24 crew were rescued by the United States Life-Saving Service. She was on a voyage from Bremerhaven to New York, United States. Her wreck sank in 20 feet (6 m) of water and is known as the "Mantoloking Wreck."

== 15 October ==
List of shipwrecks: 15 October 1883
Ship	State	Description
Salto	United Kingdom	The schooner collided with another vessel and sank off Dungeness, Kent with the loss of one of her six crew.
Unnamed	Flag unknown	A schooner ran aground on the Shingles Sand, off the north Kent coast.

== 16 October ==
List of shipwrecks: 16 October 1883
Ship	State	Description
Agar	Austria-Hungary	The barque was run into by Florence (United States and sank in the Atlantic Ocean (38°06′N 53°18′W). Her crew were rescued by Florence. Agar was on a voyage from New York, United States to Lisbon, Portugal.

== 17 October ==
List of shipwrecks: 17 October 1883
Ship	State	Description
Adel	Flag unknown	The ship ran aground at Arkhangelsk, Russia. She was on a voyage from Arkhangelsk to a British port.
Gwen Jones	United Kingdom	The ship was driven onto the Thief Sand, off the north Norfolk coast. She was on a voyage from King's Lynn, Norfolk to Swansea, Glamorgan. She was refloated and towed in to King's Lynn in a leaky condition.
Magellan	Norway	The barque was driven ashore and wrecked near Yarmouth, Isle of Wight, United Kingdom. Her crew were rescued by the tug Lightning (United Kingdom).
Minnie	United Kingdom	The ship ran aground at IJmuiden, North Holland, Netherlands.
Speedwell	United Kingdom	The smack was driven ashore at Aberporth, Cardiganshire. Her crew were rescued by rocket apparatus.

== 18 October ==
List of shipwrecks: 18 October 1883
Ship	State	Description
Agelm	Germany	The steamship ran aground on the Cutler Sand, in the North Sea off the coast of Essex, United Kingdom. She was on a voyage from Kiel to London, United Kingdom. She was refloated and taken in to Harwich, Essex.
Aline Woermann	Germany	The steamship foundered near Texel and Vlieland, Netherlands with the loss of all 33 people on board. She was on a voyage from Hamburg to the west coast of Africa.
Bellingham	United Kingdom	The steamship was driven ashore at Livorno, Italy. She was on a voyage from South Shields, County Durham to Livorno.
Clara	Norway	The ship was wrecked at Sainte-Marie-de-Mer, Pyrénées-Orientales, France. She was on a voyage from the Rio Pongo to Marseille, Bouches-du-Rhône, France.
Die Peene	Germany	The brig foundered off Texel, North Holland, Netherlands. Her nine crew were rescued by the smack Fisher (United Kingdom). Die Peene was on a voyage from Penzance, Cornwall, United Kingdom to Stettin.
Oak	United Kingdom	The fishing smack was run down and sunk at Hull, Yorkshire by the steamship Domino (United Kingdom). Her crew were rescued.
Toledo	United Kingdom	The steamship ran aground at "Hanibal". Her crew were taken off, but her captain remained on board. She was on a voyage from Burntisland, Fife to Wismar, Germany.
Unnamed	Flag unknown	A brigantine was driven ashore on the coast of Somerset, United Kingdom.

== 20 October ==
List of shipwrecks: 20 October 1883
Ship	State	Description
Carrie	United States	The steamship capsized in the James River in a squall. A fireman died.
Unnamed	United Kingdom	A lighter collided with the tug Lizard (United Kingdom) and sank at Hartlepool, County Durham with the loss of three of the seven people on board.
Two unnamed vessels	United States	Two fishing schooners were lost off the coast of Massachusetts with the loss of twenty lives.

== 23 October ==
List of shipwrecks: 23 October 1883
Ship	State	Description
Alliance, and Normandie	France	The schooner Alliance collided with the steamship Normandie and sank at Havre de Grâce, Seine-Inférieure. Normandie was on a voyage from New York to Havre de Grâce. She subsequently struck the quayside and was severely damaged.

== 24 October ==
List of shipwrecks: 24 October 1883
Ship	State	Description
I Am Here	United States	The boat went ashore on Star Island, Isles of Shoals, and bilged. Her crew were rescued. Possibly repaired and returned to service,
Mirzapore	United Kingdom	The full-rigged ship was driven ashore near Le Touquet, Pas-de-Calais, France. Her crew were rescued. She was on a voyage from London to Melbourne, Victoria.

== 25 October ==
List of shipwrecks: 25 October 1883
Ship	State	Description
Catherine	Germany	The brig was driven ashore in Algoa Bay. Her crew were rescued.
Harrier	United Kingdom	The sloop was driven ashore at Moul Head, Orkney Islands. Both crew were rescued. She was on a voyage from Kirkwall, Orkney Islands to Peterhead, Aberdeenshire.
Matje	United Kingdom	The schooner was wrecked in Wick Bay with the loss of two of her crew. She was on a voyage from Denmark to Liverpool, Lancashire.
Schamyl	United States	The barque was driven ashore and wrecked at East London, Cape Colony.
Vixen	Natal Colony	The fishing trawler was driven ashore and capsized at Port Elizabeth.
Unnamed	Flag unknown	A schooner was driven ashore at Keiss, Caithness, United Kingdom.

== 28 October ==
List of shipwrecks: 28 October 1883
Ship	State	Description
Douro	United Kingdom	The steamship was driven ashore at "Nagara". She was on a voyage from Odesa, Russia to Antwerp, Belgium. She was refloated.
H. W. Edye	United States	The tug suffered a boiler explosion and sank between the pier at Fort Morgan, Alabama and the bar at the mouth of Mobile Bay. Four crew were killed.

== 29 October ==
List of shipwrecks: 29 October 1883
Ship	State	Description
Adorna	Germany	The full-rigged ship collided with the steamship Vespasian (United Kingdom) 2 nautical miles (3.7 km) south east of the Varne Lightvessel ( Trinity House) and was severely damaged. Adorna was on a voyage from Hamburg to New York, United States. She was taken in tow by the steamship Chillingham (United Kingdom) and beached at Dover, Kent, United Kingdom with assistance from the tugs Granville and Lady Vita (both United Kingdom).
City of Berlin	United Kingdom	The steamship collided with HMS Hawk (Royal Navy) 47 nautical miles (87 km) north east of the Tuskar Rock.
Maud F. Leighton	United States	The fishing schooner departed from Provincetown, Massachusetts for the Georges Bank and would have reached it before the gales, and probably sank in the gales on 12, 13, and 14 November. Lost with all sixteen crew.

== 30 October ==
List of shipwrecks: 30 October 1883
Ship	State	Description
Petrus	Norway	The barque ran aground in the River Ouse. She was on a voyage from Punta Arena, Chile to Goole, Yorkshire, United Kingdom. She was refloated the next day.
Rocaberg	United Kingdom	The brig collided with the full-rigged ship Thomas Dana (United States) and sank in the Atlantic Ocean (48°37′N 15°14′W) with the loss of 88 of the 109 people on board. Survivors were rescued by Thomas Dana. Rocaberg was on a voyage from Saint-Pierre, Saint Pierre and Miquelon to Saint-Malo, Ille-et-Vilaine.
York City	United Kingdom	The steamship ran aground in the River Tay. She was on a voyage from Dundee, Forfarshire to New York, United States. She was refloated and resumed her voyage.

== 31 October ==
List of shipwrecks: 31 October 1883
Ship	State	Description
Alhambra, and Holyhead	Germany; United Kingdom	The barque Alhambra and the steamship Holyhead collided in the Irish Sea 25 nautical miles (46 km) off Holyhead, Anglesey and both sank. Alhambra was on a voyage from Liverpool, Lancashire to New York, United States. She lost thirteen of the 27 people on board. Survivors were rescued by boats from Holyhead, which was on a voyage from Dublin to Holyhead. Holyhead lost two of her crew. The rest of her 27 crew and her four passengers took to four lifeboats, which were towed in to Holyhead by the schooner Gertrude (United Kingdom).
Arab	United States	The schooner ran aground at St. Joseph, Michigan. She was on a voyage from Frankfort, Michigan to Milwaukee, Wisconsin. Her five crew survived. She was refloated, but then capsized and sank on 11 November while under tow to Milwaukee.
Caithness Lass	United Kingdom	The schooner was driven ashore and wrecked on the Crudenscars. Her four crew were rescued by a fishing boat.
Rudoph	United Kingdom	The schooner collided with the steamship Clifton Grove at Cowes, Isle of Wight and was severely damaged.

== Unknown date ==
List of shipwrecks: Unknown date in October 1883
Ship	State	Description
Adele Maria	United Kingdom	The ship was wrecked at Maranhão, Brazil with some loss of life. She was on a voyage from Cardiff, Glamorgan to Maranhão.
Armida	Flag unknown	The ship was driven ashore in the Flintrännan. She was on a voyage from Sundsvall, Sweden to Bilbao, Spain. She was refloated and put back to Sundsvall.
Bedlormie	United Kingdom	The steamship was run down and sunk at Greenock, Renfrewshire by the steamship Banner (United Kingdom). She was refloated on 3 October and taken in to Greenock.
Bolivar	Germany	The brig ran aground at Ciudad Bolivar, Venezuela. She was on a voyage from Ciudad Bolivar to Hamburg.
Caledonia	United Kingdom	The barquentine ran aground on the South Ouse Sand, off the north Kent coast.
Clio	United Kingdom	The brigantine was driven ashore at Clayshant Head, Wigtownshire. Her crew were rescued. She was on a voyage from Dublin to Ardrossan, Ayrshire.
Colina	United Kingdom	The steamship ran aground at Cardiff.
Dinnington	United Kingdom	The steamship was driven ashore in the Seine at "Fatonville". She was refloated and resumed her voyage.
Dissington	United Kingdom	The steamship ran aground and sank on Neckmansgrund, in the Baltic Sea.
Ekero	(Russian Empire) Grand Duchy of Finland	The schooner was abandoned in the North Sea 50 nautical miles (93 km) off Lowestoft, Suffolk, United Kingdom. Her crew were rescued by the smack Renown (United Kingdom). Ekero was on a voyage from Antwerp, Belgium to a Finnish port.
Enigheden	Norway	The jagt was driven ashore at Kalmar, Sweden.
Euripides	Flag unknown	The steamship was driven ashore at Hjelmen, Denmark. She was on a voyage from New Orleans, Louisiana, United States to Copenhagen, Denmark.
Far West	United States	The sternwheel paddle steamer was lost when she hit a snag on the Missouri River near St. Charles, Missouri.
Felix Brandt	Denmark	The barque was driven ashore. She was refloated and taken in to Fredrikshavn, where she arrived on 5 October.
Franziska	Russia	The ship was towed into the River Tyne in a waterlogged condition.
Frigorifique	France	The steamship was driven ashore in the Seine at "Fatonville". She was refloated and resumed her voyage.
George Leed	United Kingdom	The schooner was driven ashore and wrecked at Mostardas, Brazil. Her crew were rescued. She was on a voyage from Liverpool to Pelotas, Brazil.
Germania	United Kingdom	The steamship ran aground off the Packerort Lighthouse, Russia. She was on a voyage from Riga, Russia to Lübeck.
Hispania	Flag unknown	The ship collided with the steamship Riga (Germany) and was severely damaged. She was taken in to Stettin, Germany.
Ida	Norway	The brig ran aground off Bolderāja, Russia. She was refloated but had to be beached.
Jane Cory, and Niord	United Kingdom; Norway	The steamships collided at Copenhagen and were both severely damaged. Jane Cory was on a voyage from Söderhamn, Sweden to Dover, Kent. Niord was on a voyage from Kronstadt, Russia to Rotterdam, South Holland, Netherlands. She was beached.
J. F. Merry	United States	The brig collided with the steamship Kepler (United Kingdom) at Montevideo, Uruguay and was severely damaged.
Juana Nancy	United Kingdom	The steamship was driven ashore south of St. Mary's Island, Northumberland. She was on a voyage from Bilbao, Spain to the River Tyne. She was refloated and taken in to Elswick, Northumberland.
Juliane Renate	Germany	The steamship was driven ashore at Hela. She was on a voyage from Danzig to Rotterdam.
Larkspur	United Kingdom	The barque capsized and sank while entering Mauritius harbour while under tow. Five the crew survived but her captain was drowned.
Louise	Netherlands	The schooner collided with the steamship Elf (United Kingdom) and was severely damaged. Louise was on a voyage from Middelburg, Zeeland to Riga, Russia. She put in to Copenhagen in a severely leaky condition.
Marie	Denmark	The schooner was driven ashore on Læsø. She was on a voyage from Iceland to Copenhagen. She was refloated with the assistance of a steamship and taken in to Copenhagen.
Martha	Norway	The barque ran aground in the Middelgrund. She was on a voyage from Riga to London, United Kingdom. She was refloated and resumed her voyage.
Maud	United Kingdom	The Mersey Flat collided with another Mersey Flat and sank at Liverpool, Lancashire.
Medusa	United Kingdom	The steamship was driven ashore and severely damaged at "Gaden".
Miranda	United Kingdom	The steamship collided with a Spanish steamship and broke in tow. Her crew survived. She was on a voyage from Kronstadt to Rotterdam.
Nanny	(Russian Empire) Grand Duchy of Finland	The barque was driven ashore on Saltholm, Denmark.
Nellie	United Kingdom	The steamship was driven ashore at Landskrona, Sweden.
Nelson	United Kingdom	The brigantine ran aground at Ardglass, County Down and was beached.
Orvar Odd	Norway	The brig sank at Douglas, Isle of Man. She was on a voyage from Sundsvall, Sweden to Douglas.
Palmerin	United Kingdom	The steamship was driven ashore and wrecked near Cape St. Mary's, Newfoundland Colony. Her crew were rescued.
Paposa	Germany	The barque collided with the steamship Cramlington (United Kingdom) and sank at Glückstadt.
Persian	United Kingdom	The steamship ran aground off the Formby Lightship ( Trinity House). She was refloated with assistance from the tug Constitution (United Kingdom) and taken in to Liverpool.
Ruth Groves	United States	The schooner vanished after leaving the Provincetown, Massachusetts on 21 October. Believed to have sunk in a gale that occurred on 12 November on the Georges Bank. Lost with all twelve crew.
Salome	Denmark	The schooner collided with the brig Triton (Norway) and was severely damaged. Salome was on a voyage from Ystad, Sweden to Helsinki, Finland. She put in to Rønne.
Sirocco	United Kingdom	The steamship caught fire at Savannah, Georgia, United States.
Spearman	United Kingdom	The steamship caught fire at Key West, Florida, United States.
St. Athens	United Kingdom	The steamship ran aground at "Sonderose", Denmark. She was on a voyage from Wick, Caithness to Danzig. She was refloated with assistance.
Theresina	United Kingdom	The steamship ran aground at Pará, Brazil and was severely damaged. She was refloated.
Weardale	United Kingdom	The ship was driven ashore and wrecked in the Seine at "Fatonville". Her crew were rescued.
Unnamed	France	A lighter collided with the steamship Olinda and sank at Bordeaux, Gironde.
