= Australasia (disambiguation) =

Australasia is a region that comprises Australia, New Zealand and some neighbouring islands in the Pacific Ocean.

Australasia may also refer to:

- Australasia (album), by Pelican, 2003
- "Australasia" (poem), poem by William Wentworth, 1823
- SS Australasia, an American Great Lakes freighter 1884–1896

== See also ==
- Australasian (disambiguation)
