= Thasos (disambiguation) =

Thasos is a Greek island. The name may also refer to:

- Thasos, a town on the island of the same name
- Thasos, a figure of Greek mythology

== Similar ==
- SS Thasos, a wrecked German steamship
- Ottoman destroyer Taşoz, Durandal-class destroyer used by the Ottoman Navy
- Thasian rebellion, also known as the Thasos revolt, a war in Ancient Greece
