= SS Iberia (1873) =

Steamship by John Elder

History

United Kingdom
- Name: SS Iberia
- Operator: Pacific Steam Navigation Company
- Port of registry: Liverpool
- Builder: John Elder & Company, Fairfield
- Yard number: 161
- Launched: 6 December 1873
- Identification: Official number: 69336
- Fate: Scrapped, 1903

General characteristics
- Type: Steamship
- Tonnage: 4689 grt, 2982 nrt
- Length: 433.5 feet (132.1 m)
- Beam: 45 feet (14 m)
- Depth: 35.1 feet (10.7 m)

SS Iberia was a steamship built by John Elder & Company and launched in 1873 for the Pacific Steam Navigation Company. She was operated by the Orient Line from 1881 and scrapped in May 1903 at Genoa.

Iberia took part of the New South Wales Contingent to serve in Sudan with British forces as part of the Suakin Expedition, arriving at the Red Sea port of Suakin on 29 March 1885. She took 400 sick and wounded back to Britain accompanied by three nursing sisters including Louisa Parsons.

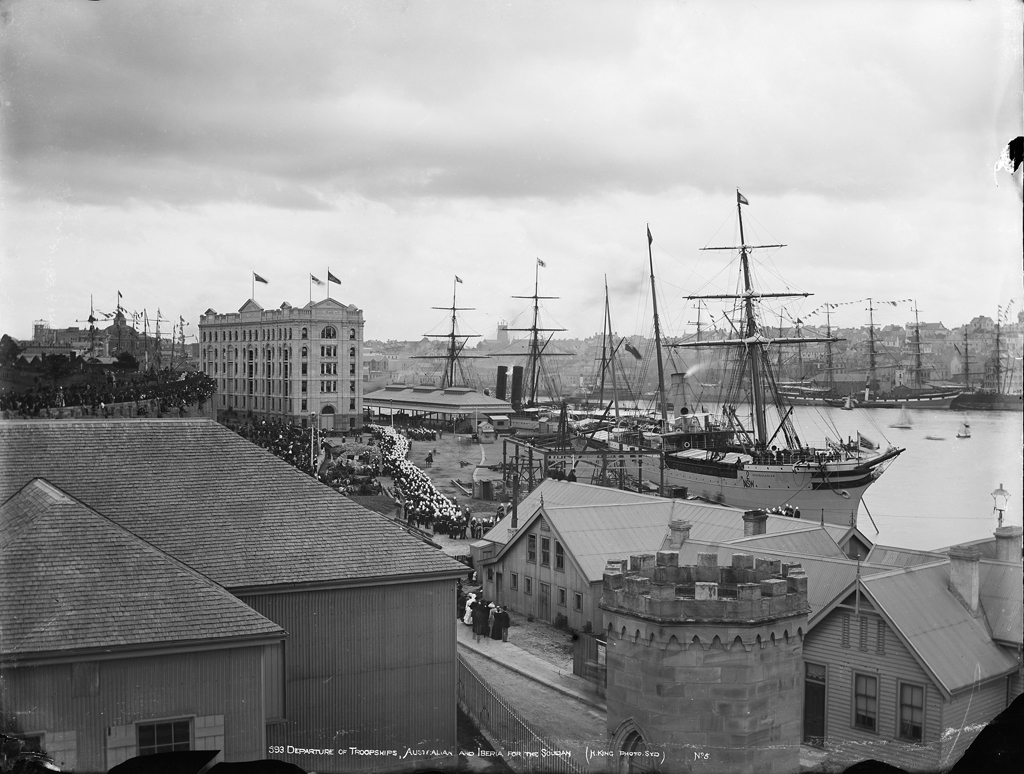
Departure of troopships 'Australian' and 'Iberia' from Sydney for the Soudan on 3 March 1885.
