= Australasian (disambiguation) =

Australasian refers to Australasia, a region that comprises Australia, New Zealand and some neighbouring islands in the Pacific Ocean. Australasian may also refer to:

== Ships ==
- SS Australasian, a 19th-century steamship liner owned by Cunard Line
- SS Australasian, the name of two steamships owned by Allan Line Royal Mail Steamers
- SS Australasian (1884), later SS Scham

== See also ==
- Austroasiatic languages
- Austronesian languages
