= Isabel Hampton Robb =

American nurse theorist, author, nursing school administrator and early leader

- Born: August 26, 1859; Welland, Canada West
- Died: April 15, 1910 (aged 50); Cleveland, Ohio
- Education: Bellevue Training School for Nurses
- Medical career
- Field: Nursing
- Institutions: Johns Hopkins Hospital, Nurses' Associated Alumnae of the US and Canada
- Awards: American Nurses Association Hall of Fame inductee

Isabel Adams Hampton Robb (1859–1910) was an American nurse theorist, author, nursing school administrator and early leader. Hampton was the first Superintendent of Nurses at the Johns Hopkins School of Nursing, wrote several influential textbooks, and helped to found the organizations that became known as the National League for Nursing, the International Council of Nurses, and the American Nurses Association. Hampton also played a large role in advancing the social status of nursing through her work in developing a curriculum of more advanced training during her time at the Johns Hopkins School of Nursing.

== Early life and career (1859-1889) ==
Isabel Hampton was born in Welland, Canada West, on August 26, 1859. At 17, she became a public school teacher in Merritton, Ontario. She attended a collegiate institution after high school, but a significant part of her early education was attained through independent study. Hampton enrolled in the Bellevue Hospital Training School for Nurses in 1881 and graduated in 1883. After graduation, she briefly worked as a nurse in New York and later went to work in Rome at St. Paul's House. Here, she worked for a hospital that served American and European travelers.

Upon returning the United States, she worked as a private duty nurse for the Conover family in New Jersey. In 1886, Hampton went to Chicago and assumed the role of superintendent of Illinois Training School for Nurses at the Cook County Hospital. During her time in Chicago, she implemented reforms, many of which are still followed today. One of her most notable contributions to the system of nursing education was the implementation of a grading policy for nursing students. Students would need to prove their competency in order to receive qualifications. Before Hampton's reforms, nursing had been largely taken up by lower-class women who were unable to hold other jobs.

== Career at Johns Hopkins (1889-1894) ==
=== Early impact on Hopkins Nursing ===
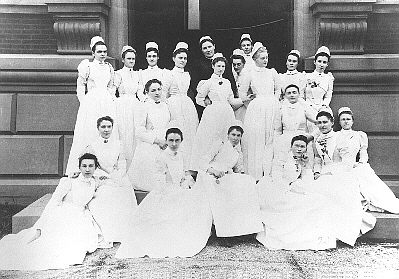
Isabel Hampton, pictured in the dark dress, standing with the 1893 graduating class of the Johns Hopkins Training School for Nurses.

In 1889, Hampton was chosen to be the superintendent of nurses and principal of the training school at the new Johns Hopkins School of Nursing. However, she was not available for three months, so it was Louisa Parsons who is credited as the first superintendent.

It was Hampton's strong leadership and educational background that was recognized by the chairman of the Johns Hopkins Hospital, William Osler, after he said the following during the interviewing process: "Miss Isabel Hampton entered the room looking like an animated Greek statue...we knew that all was settled...Her certificates were looked at...and all was settled in a few minutes." She continued to suggest reforms, participate in teaching, and publish textbooks. Right from the beginning, Hampton extended the nursing program's length from 2 to 3 years, while also establishing eight-hour workdays for nurses. She also eliminated stipends, began a Nurses' Alumnae Association, and created a Nurses' Journal Club.

=== Nursing: Its Principles and Practice ===
It was during her time at Hopkins that Hampton wrote the famous textbook Nursing: Its Principles and Practice. It was published in 1893 and, as a review of the second edition of the textbook that appeared in The Journal of the American Medical Association stated, the textbook "stands without a competitor." This text was not only unique, but critical to a better understanding of nursing as a whole because it included in-depth analyses of topics including: an outline for a 3-year long nursing curriculum, economics of hospital wards, proper hygiene protocol in hospitals, and protocol for bacteriological notes and proper bed making. Such comprehensive detail in one foundational text brought about a sense of structure in nursing and demonstrated its crucial role in the hospital environment. As Hampton said, herself: "This arrangement at the same time will relieve the nurses of much of the domestic side of their work and thus enable them to devote more time to actual nursing, with the result that the patients will receive better care."

Her book is known for "standardizing the education for nursing in the United States and abroad."

=== Further impact on the nursing field ===
In 1893 at the World's Fair in Chicago, Hampton organized the nurses section of the International Congress of Charities, Correction and Philanthropy. This laid the foundation for Hampton and Lavinia Dock to found the American Society of Superintendents of Training Schools for Nurses of the United States and Canada, a precursor to the current National League for Nursing Education. Hampton later served as the president of this organization.

Hampton stated that she had shown so much interest in Johns Hopkins because the institution "would be the first in this country to have a primary interest in education, research, and health care."

Isabel Hampton Robb
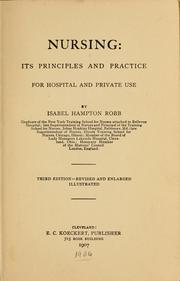
- This book was one of the first texts to be written on nursing in America. It was crucial in establishing nursing as a legitimate and necessary profession in the medical field.
- Author: Isabel Hampton Robb
- Original title: Nursing: Its Principles and Practice
- Subject: Nursing
- Genre: Medicine
- Set in: United States of America
- Publication date: 1909

== Later life and career (1894-1910) ==
In 1894, Hampton left Johns Hopkins to marry Dr. Hunter Robb, who was an obstetrician/gynecologist at Johns Hopkins. Hampton and Robb moved to Ohio, where Robb had a new position as professor of gynecology at Case Western Reserve University. Hampton and her husband had two children, in 1895 and 1902.

In 1896, Hampton became the first president of the Nurses' Associated Alumnae of the United States and Canada, which has since become the American Nurses Association. Hampton also played roles in both establishing the American Journal of Nurses and a course on Hospital Economics at the Teachers College, Columbia University in 1899. Hampton, M. Adelaide Nutting, and Lavinia Dock were among the first professors for this course. They offered their services pro bono.

She was a key figure in the development for curriculum for the Lakeside Hospital Training School for Nurses, the nucleus for Case Western's future School of Nursing, as a member of the Lady Board of Governors. Lakeside's program became one of the first schools to implement the teachings of Florence Nightingale.

Hampton was an active member of the Matrons Council, a small international group of nurses concerned with professional development. A committee to establish the International Council of Nurses was created in 1899. Hampton served as an American representative.

Hampton also authored Nursing Ethics in 1900 and Educational Standards for Nurses in 1907. In a 1901 review of Nursing Ethics, the Baltimore American said, "This text-book differs from any other on the market at the present time, in that it deals simply with the principles and practice of nursing, and omits the usual smattering of teaching on a great variety of subjects. The author books, each dealing with a single subject, such as anatomy, physiology, materia medica, massage, bandaging and invalid cookery, particularly insists that for thorough training in nursing it is necessary that each nurse should be supplied with various additional which are quite distinct from, although supplementary to, the principles of nursing."

== Death ==
Hampton died on Friday, April 15, 1910 while walking on Euclid Avenue in Cleveland. She was on the way to her son's dance class with a friend. She stepped between two streetcar tracks to avoid being hit by a rapidly approaching automobile. Two streetcars passed on the tracks on either side of her and she was instantly killed. She is buried in St. Mary's Cemetery of Burlington, New Jersey.

== Awards and legacy ==
In 1976, Hampton was posthumously inducted to the American Nurses Association Hall of Fame.

The following awards and funds carry on Isabel Hampton's legacy by promoting leadership, perseverance, and innovation in the nursing field. They are among the most prestigious nursing commendations one can receive today.

- Isabel Robb Memorial Fund - supports the Graduate Nurses' Association and nursing school scholarships
- Isabel Hampton Robb Leadership Award - presented to a Student Nurses' Association state president whose leadership characteristics best resemble those of Isabel Hampton Robb
- The NLN Isabel Hampton Robb Award for Outstanding Leadership in Clinical Practice - awarded to he/she who best reflects the ideals of Isabel Hampton Robb in the clinical setting

== Works ==
- Hampton, Isabel Adams (1894). Nursing: Its Principles and Practice for Hospital and Private Use. W.B. Saunders.
- Robb, Isabel Hampton (1900). Nursing Ethics. Cleveland: E.C. Koeckert. "isabel hampton."
- Robb, Isabel Hampton (1907). Educational Standards for Nurses. Cleveland: E.C. Koeckert.

== See also ==
- History of nursing in the United States
