= New South Wales Contingent =

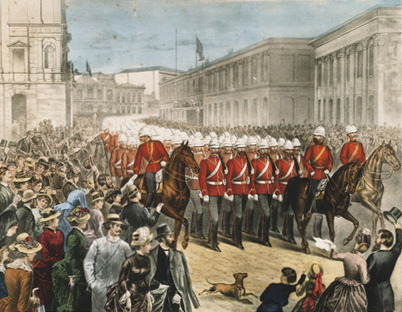
- Departure of the NSW Contingent, 1885.
- Active: 1885
- Disbanded: 1885
- Country: New South Wales
- Allegiance: British Empire
- Size: ~ 770 men and 200 horses
- Part of: Suakin Expedition
- Engagements: Mahdist War
- Battle honours: Suakin 1885

Commanders
- Commanding Officer: John Soame Richardson

The New South Wales Contingent served in Sudan with British forces as part of the Suakin Expedition in 1885. Consisting of an infantry battalion, an artillery battery, and a small field ambulance detachment, it departed from Sydney on 3 March 1885. Arriving at Suakin on 29 March it ultimately saw little action, being involved in a minor action at Tamai on 3 April, and another at Takdul on 6 May. However, with the British deciding to abandon the campaign it re-embarked on 17 May and returned to Sydney on 19 June 1885, where it was disbanded. The New South Wales Contingent was the first military contingent to be raised and deployed overseas by an Australian colony.

== History ==
During the early years of the 1880s, an Egyptian regime in the Sudan, backed by the British, came under threat from rebellion under the leadership of native Muhammad Ahmad (or Ahmed), known as Mahdi to his followers. In 1883, as part of the Mahdist War, the Egyptians sent an army to deal with the revolt, but they were defeated and faced a difficult campaign of extracting their forces. The British instructed the Egyptians to abandon the Sudan, and sent General Charles Gordon to co-ordinate the evacuation, but he was killed on 26 January 1885 during the fall of Khartoum. When news of his death arrived in New South Wales in February 1885, the government offered to send forces and meet the contingent's expenses. The British government subsequently accepted the offer, although similar commitments from Victoria, Queensland, and South Australia were declined. The New South Wales Contingent consisted of an infantry battalion of 522 men and 24 officers, and an artillery battery of 212 men, a small field ambulance detachment, and 200 horses, led by Colonel John Soame Richardson, sailed from Sydney on 3 March 1885, aboard the ships Iberia and Australasian. A large crowd of more than 200,000 people saw them off, while the dispatch of the contingent was portrayed in a number of contemporary newspapers as the "coming of age" of the Australian colonies.

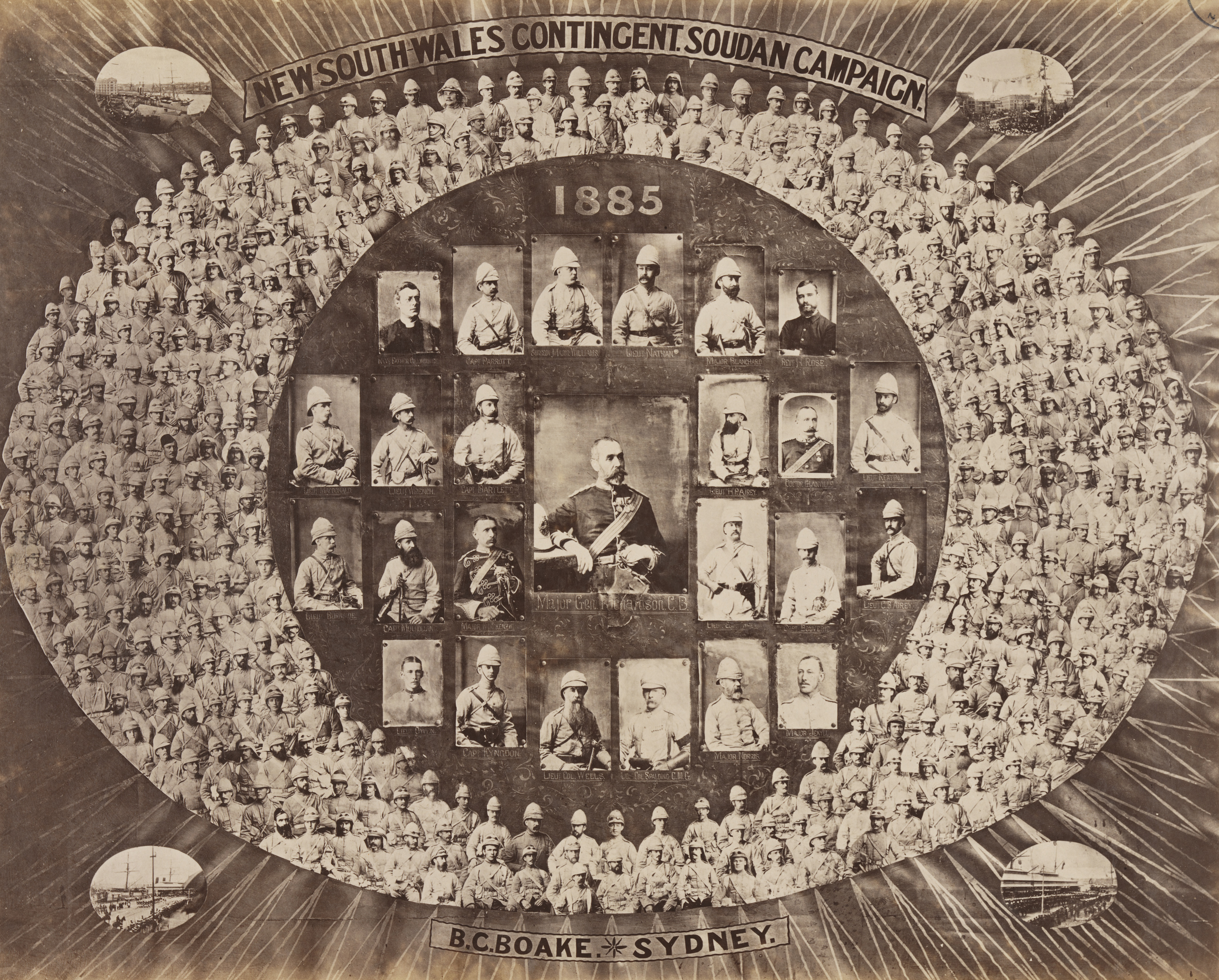
Composite photographic portrait of the New South Wales Contingent, Sudan Campaign, 1885,

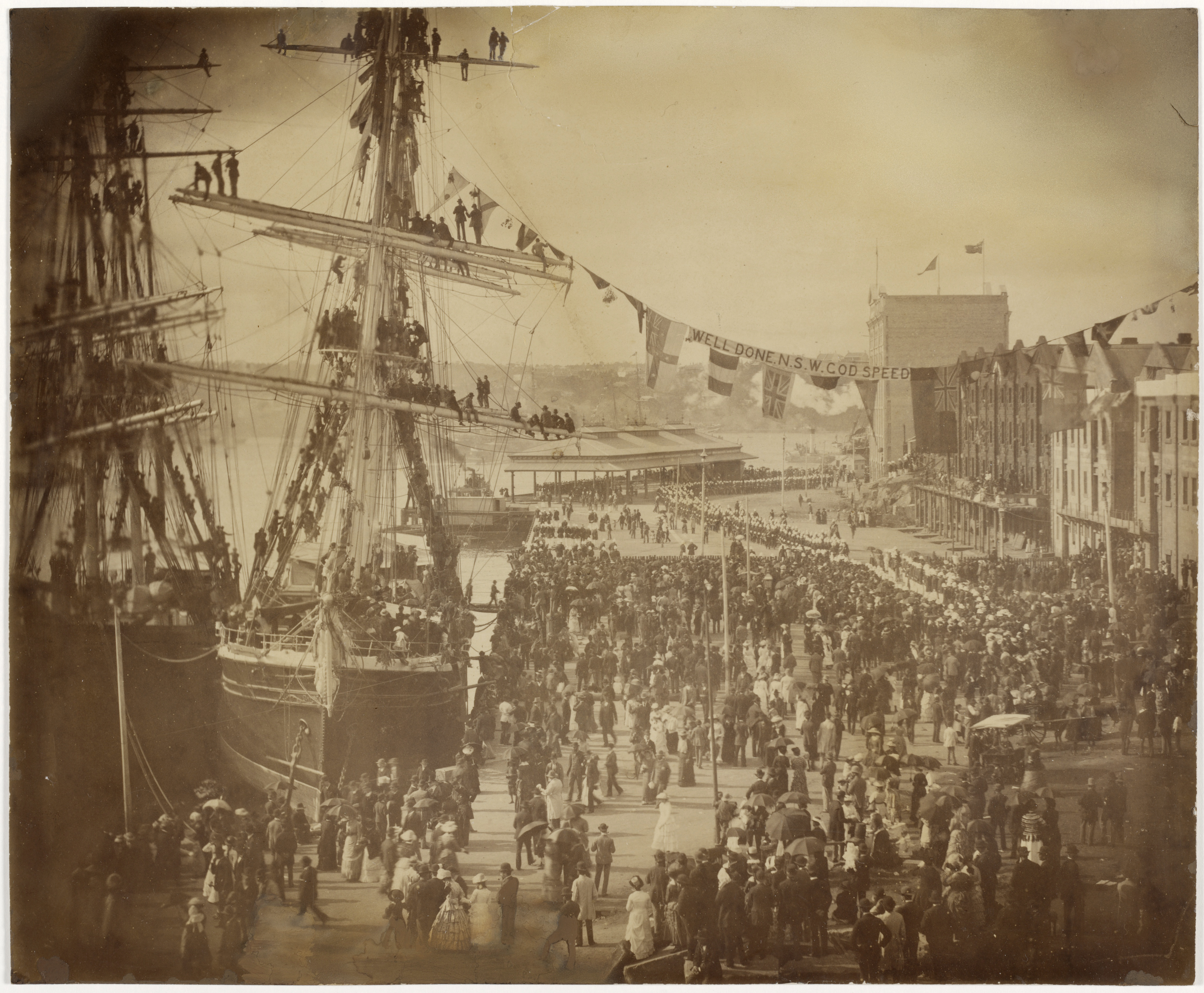
departure of New South Wales Contingent for Sudan war, Circular Quay. Sydney, 1885

The contingent arrived at the Red Sea port of Suakin on 29 March. On arrival they were issued with new khaki field uniforms, which replaced their scarlet jackets and white trousers, while their white helmets and webbing were stained brown to be more suitable for the conditions of the campaign. Most were armed with Alexander Henry rifles and carbines, although some Martini-Henry rifles may also have been used. The Ambulance detachment were armed with Winchester Model 1873 carbines. The New South Wales Contingent was attached to a brigade that consisted of Scots, Grenadier and Coldstream Guards. They subsequently marched for Tamai on 2 April in a large "square" formation made up of 10,000 men. Reaching the village the following day, they burned huts and returned to Suakin: three Australians were wounded in minor fighting. Most of the contingent was then sent to work on a railway line that was being laid across the desert towards Berber, on the Nile. The Australians were then assigned to guard duties, but soon a camel corps was raised and 50 men volunteered. They rode on a reconnaissance to Takdul on 6 May and were heavily involved in a skirmish during which more than 100 Arabs were killed or captured. On 15 May, they made one last sortie to bury the dead from the fighting of the previous March. Meanwhile, the artillery were posted at Handoub and drilled for a month, but they soon rejoined the camp at Suakin.

Eventually the British government decided that the campaign in Sudan was not worth the effort required and left a garrison in Suakin. The New South Wales Contingent sailed for home on 17 May aboard the ship Arab. Arriving in Sydney on 19 June 1885, it was subsequently disbanded. Approximately 770 Australians served in Sudan; nine subsequently died of disease during the return journey while three had been wounded during the campaign. The New South Wales Contingent was the first military contingent to be raised and deployed overseas by an Australian colony. Members of the contingent were awarded the Egypt Medal with the clasp "Suakin 1885" and the Khedive's Star. In 1907 the New South Wales infantry regiments of the Australian Army that were descended to the colonial units which contributed volunteers to the New South Wales Contingent were awarded the battle honour "Suakin 1885". This became the Australian Army's first battle honour. Today it is considered significant not due to the size of the commitment, or its level of involvement in the campaign and casualties, but in the way it demonstrated the level of imperial sentiment present in Australian society at the time.

== See also ==
- Colonial forces of Australia
- Barcroft Capel Boake, photographer of contingent
