= John Soame Richardson =

British army officer

John Soame Richardson CB
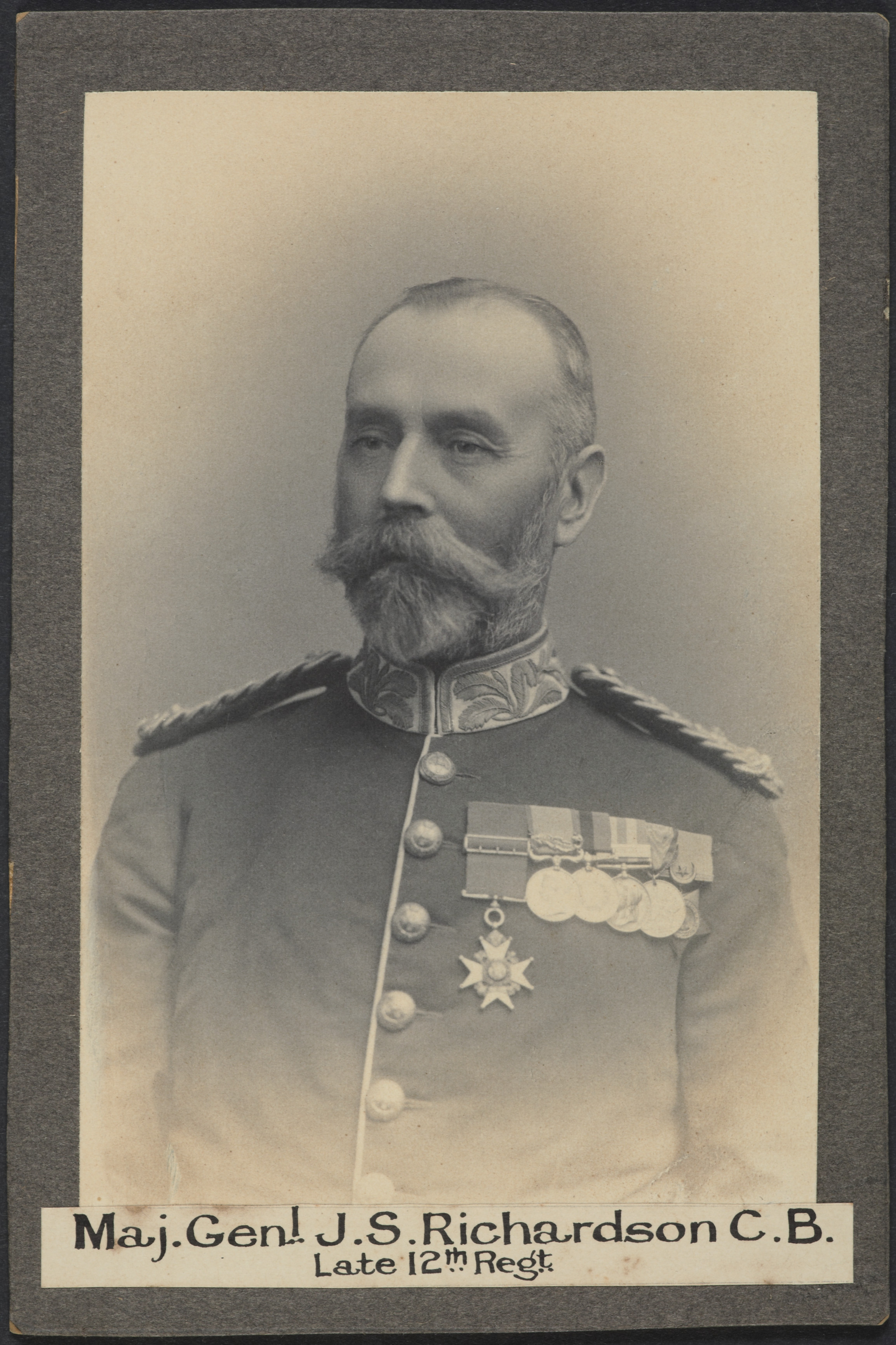
- John Soame Richardson
- Born: 16 March 1836; Heydon, Norfolk, England
- Died: 9 June 1896 (aged 60); Sydney, Australia
- Military career
- Allegiance: United Kingdom; Colony of New South Wales
- Branch: (United Kingdom of Great Britain and Ireland) British Army (1854–1864); New South Wales Military Forces (1864–1892)
- Service years: 1854–1892
- Rank: Major General
- Commands: New South Wales Military Forces; New South Wales Contingent
- Conflicts: Crimean War; Siege of Sevastopol; New Zealand Wars; First Taranaki War; Invasion of the Waikato; Mahdist War; Suakin Expedition
- Awards: Companion of the Order of the Bath; Mentioned in Despatches

Major General John Soame Richardson, CB (16 March 1836 – 9 June 1896) was a British Army officer and Commander of the Forces in colonial New South Wales.

Richardson was born in Heydon, Norfolk, England, and entered the British Army in 1854. The following year, he served with the 72nd Highlanders in the Crimean War, and was present at the siege and fall of Sebastopol for which he received the Crimea Medal with clasp and the Turkish Crimea Medal. In the New Zealand Wars he served with the 1st Battalion, 12th (East Suffolk) Regiment of Foot in the Taranaki district, and in the Waikato campaign in 1863 and 1864.

Richardson was awarded the New Zealand War Medal, became captain in 1863 and, retiring from the Imperial service, was in 1865 appointed to command the military forces of New South Wales, with the rank of lieutenant colonel. He became colonel in 1876 and major general in 1885, following his command of the New South Wales Contingent despatched to co-operate with the British forces in the Sudan campaign. He was also created Companion of the Order of the Bath, mentioned in despatches, and received the Egyptian Medal with clasp "Suakin 1885" and the Khedive's Star in recognition of his services.

John Soame Richardson died on 9 June 1896.
