= Louisa Parsons =

British nurse

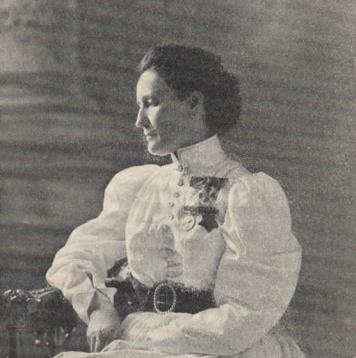
- Born: Emma Amelia Louisa Parsons; 3 June 1855; Sidbury
- Died: 2 November 1916 (aged 61); Swallowfield

Louisa Parsons RRC (3 June 1855 – 2 November 1916) was a British nurse notable during the Mahdist War, at the University of Maryland and the Second Boer War.

== Life ==
Parsons was born in 1855 in Sidbury, Devon. Her mother was Emma Amelia Parsons and she was brought up as her mother's sister because there was no named father. Her mother later married and became Emma Rose. Louisa worked as a servant. In 1880 she became a trained nurse after completing training at the Nightingale Training School in London's St Thomas's Hospital.

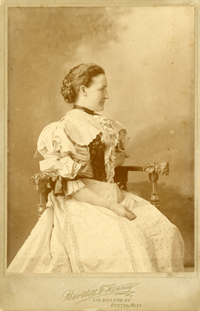
her calling card

On 23 April 1883 she was awarded the Egypt Medal and a Royal Red Cross, by (reportedly) Queen Victoria, with other nurses who had served in the Mahdist War. The Egypt Medal had a bar titled "Suakin 1885". In time she would also receive the five sided star Khedive Medal bearing the image of a sphinx.

In 1887 she went to California and South Carolina as a nurse and companion to Louisa P. Loring. Loring would in time be one of Parson's executors.

The University of Maryland credits her as their first Superintendent of their University of Maryland School of Nursing (UMSON) in 1889. Other sources note that she was chosen from 80 applicants to lead the new training school at The Johns Hopkins Hospital, in Baltimore. It was only a stop-gap appointment until Isabel Hampton Robb became free. However her performance during that period was appreciated.

In 1893 she was sent by the American Red Cross to help with the aftermath of the 1893 Sea Islands hurricane around Beaufort in South Carolina.

During the Spanish-American War she joined the U.S. Army Hospital Service and she was nursing at Fort McPherson in Atlanta.

She served in the second Boer War and she was given the Queen's South Africa Medal before she returned to England.

== Death and legacy ==
After Parsons died in 1916 in Swallowfield from cancer she was given a military funeral. The Louisa Parsons Legacy Society at the University of Maryland is named in her honour as she gave the first bequest to the nursing school. She left the school £10,000 and her collection of medals. The school named a nurses home after her and in time commissioned an oil painting.
