= SS Amsterdam (1879) =

History

United Kingdom
- Name: SS British Crown
- Owner: British Ship Owners Co.
- Operator: American Line
- Launched: 1879
- Maiden voyage: 15 October 1879
- Fate: Sold 1885 to Anchor Line

The SS Amsterdam was a passenger steamship built in 1879 by A. McMillan & Son in Dumbarton, Scotland. Originally launched as the British Crown, the vessel was acquired by the Holland America Line and renamed Amsterdam in 1887. It was used primarily for transatlantic voyages between Europe and North America during the late 19th century.
