= SS Arab =

History

United Kingdom
- Name: SS Arab
- Operator: Union Steamship Company
- Port of registry: Southampton
- Builder: James & George Thomson, Clydebank
- Yard number: 168
- Launched: 23 January 1879
- Identification: Official number: 76846
- Fate: Scrapped, 1901

General characteristics
- Type: Steamship
- Tonnage: 3170 grt; 2044 nrt
- Length: 350 feet (110 m)
- Beam: 40.2 feet (12.3 m)
- Depth: 23.6 feet (7.2 m)

SS Arab was a steamship built by James & George Thomson and launched in 1879 for the Union Steamship Company.

She was transferred to the Union-Castle Mail Steamship Company in 1901 and scrapped that year at Harburg.

Arab brought home the New South Wales Contingent that had served in Sudan with British forces as part of the Suakin Expedition, arriving at Sydney on 19 June 1885.
