= SS Australasian (1884) =

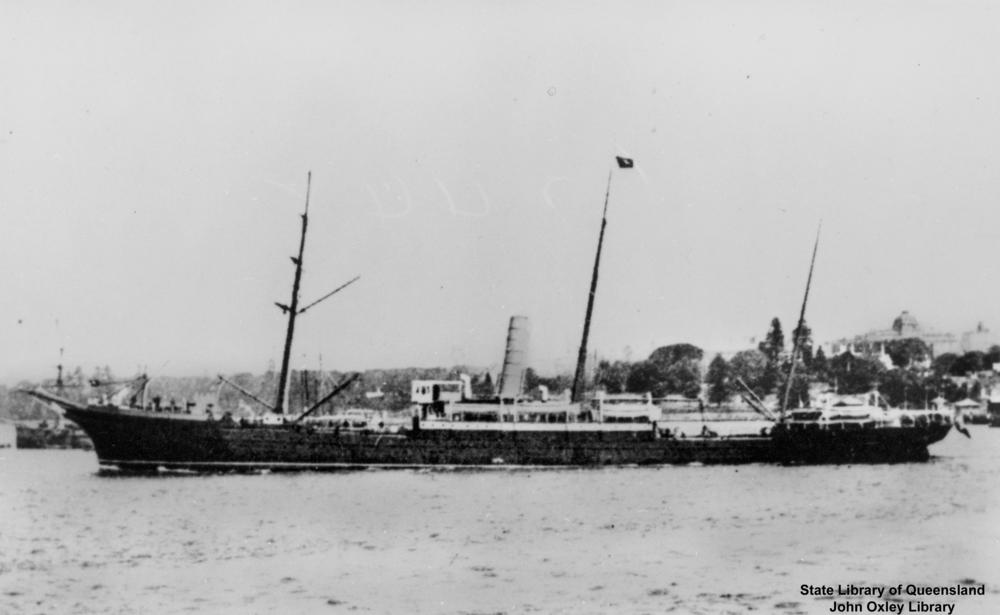
- SS Australasian

History

United Kingdom
- Name: SS Australasian
- Owner: George Thompson & Company
- Port of registry: Aberdeen
- Builder: Robert Napier & Sons, Govan
- Yard number: 391
- Launched: 10 April 1884
- Identification: Official No: 88859
- Fate: Sold in 1906

Turkey
- Name: SS Scham
- Renamed: 1907
- Fate: Scrapped, 1955

General characteristics
- Tonnage: 3662 grt; 2343 nrt
- Length: 361.6 feet (110.2 m)
- Beam: 44.2 feet (13.5 m)
- Depth: 21.3 feet (6.5 m)

SS Australasian, was built in 1884 by Robert Napier & Co of Govan, Glasgow for George Thompson & Son (Aberdeen Line). She weighed 4,000 long tons (4,100 t).

Australasian took part of the New South Wales Contingent to serve in Sudan with British forces as part of the Suakin Expedition, arriving at the Red Sea port of Suakin on 29 March 1885. In 1906 the Ottoman Government bought her and renamed her Scham. She was torpedoed by HMS E11 on 6 August 1915 in the Sea of Marmara. She was beached near Constantinople to prevent from sinking. Salvaged in 1918 she was reduced to a coal hulk. She was scrapped at Savona, Italy in 1955.

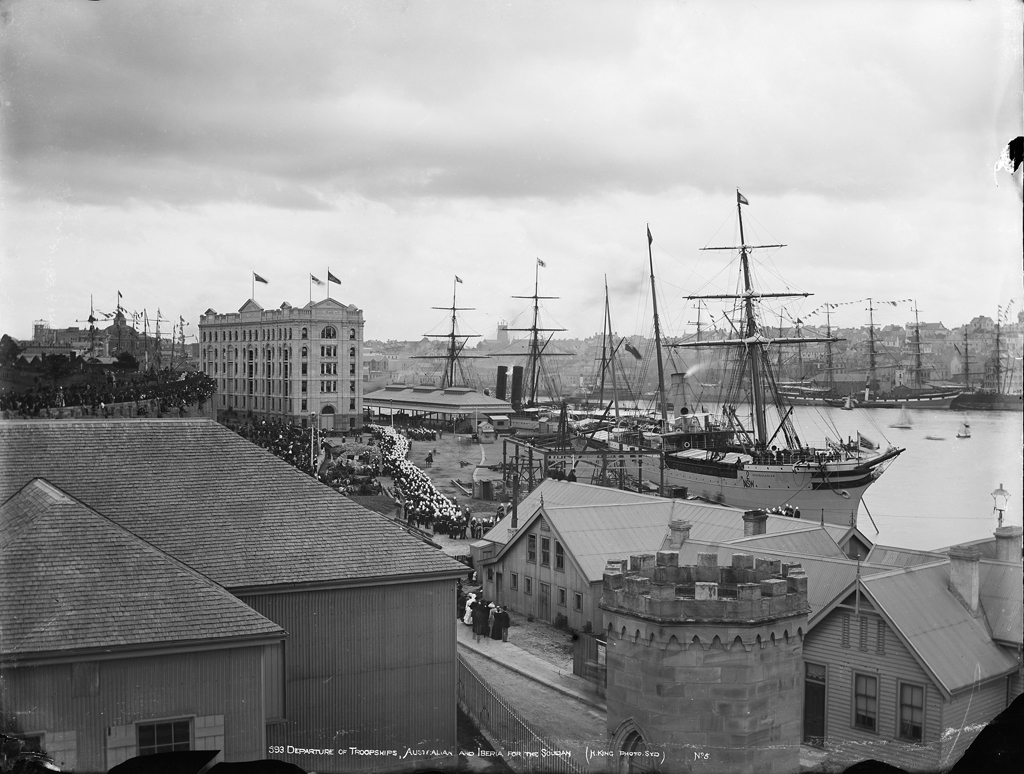
Departure of troopships 'Australian' and 'Iberia' from Sydney for the Soudan in 1885

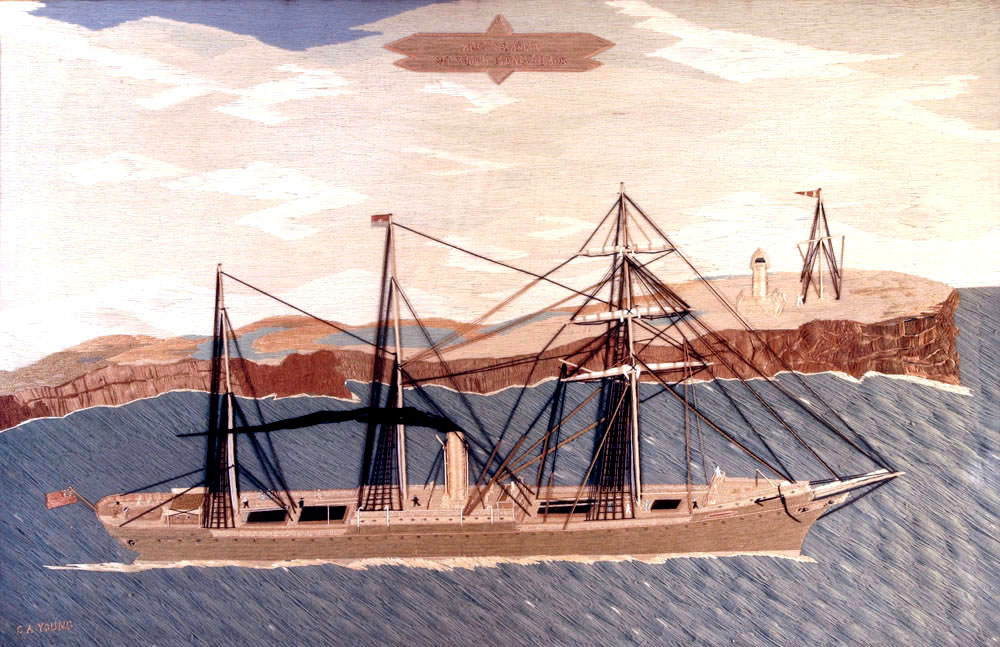
Australasian Off South Sydney Heads
