= SS Aline Woermann =

German steamship (1880–1883)

History
- Name: Aline Woermann
- Owner: Carl Woermann (Woermann-Linie)
- Port of registry: Hamburg (German Empire)
- Route: Hamburg, Germany—Liberia—Cameroon
- Builder: Reiherstieg Schiffswerfte & Maschinenfabrik, Hamburg
- Yard number: 323
- Completed: 1879
- Maiden voyage: 1880
- Out of service: 18 October 1883
- Fate: wrecked near Vlieland, the Netherlands on 18 October 1883

General characteristics
- Tonnage: 1,279 GRT
- Length: 74 m (242 ft 9 in)
- Installed power: 500 hp (370 kW)
- Propulsion: compound engine
- Speed: 9 knots (17 km/h; 10 mph)

SS Aline Woermann was a 1879 Reiherstieg Schiffswerfte & Maschinenfabrik-built 74-metre (242 ft 9 in)-long German steamship. It was owned by the Woermann-Linie of Carl Woermann registered at Hamburg, Germany. She was deployed on a scheduled service between Hamburg, Liberia and Cameroon.

On 18 October 1883 the ship foundered and wrecked near Texel and Vlieland, the Netherlands. All 27 crew members and four passengers were killed.

In the early 1990s the wreck was rediscovered. Multiple dive explorations were made to the wreck, many items were found including valuable golden coins.

== Ship details ==
Aline Woermann was a merchant ship owned by Woermann-Linie of Carl Woermann. She measured 75.2 metres (246 ft 9 in) long with a beam of 10.1 metres (33 ft 2 in) and a draught of 5.9 metres (19 ft 4 in). The ship was measured at 1,279 gross register tons (GRT). The ship had compound steam engine creating 500 horsepower (370 kW) and a speed of 9 knots (17 km/h; 10 mph).

== History ==
The ship was built by Reiherstieg Schiffswerfte & Maschinenfabrik in 1879 and had her maiden voyage in 1880. She was the first steamship of the Woermann-Linie of Carl Woermann. She was deployed on a scheduled service between Hamburg, Liberia and Cameroon.

=== Fate ===
On 17 October 1883 the ship left Hamburg for West Africa with 27 crew members and three or four passengers, including two missionaries. In the North Sea there was a tremendous storm and the ship went missing.

The ship wrecked near Vlieland. A steamship with two masts, identified as presumably the Aline Woermann, was seen eight miles (13 km) southeast of Texel. The emergency signal flag was visible from the front mast. On 23 October two masts around six feet (1.8 m) above water were seen by Captain Bone of the British steamship Maas; located around two German miles (eight miles) north-northeast of the lighthouse De Cocksdorp. The masts formed a dangerous obstacle to maritime navigation.

On 19 October 1883, three sailors (around 20 and 30 years old) wearing life jackets from the Aline Woerdmann washed ashore on Terschelling. A week later representatives from Hamburg arrived at Terschelling to investigate the bodies. Two were identified as the machinist and coal breaker.

A lot of items washed up and were salvaged, inclusive a white lifeboat with the name Aline Woerdmann, over 70 ash oars marked I, C, K and S Cameroons, barrels of gunpowder, many 170 liter barrels of spirits, bundles of staves and cabin doors. The mayor of Terschelling Dirk Reedeker made monthly appeals between October 1883 and March 1884 to the rights holders of the items to come forward.

== 20th century wreck discovery ==
Over 100 years after the ship wrecked, in the early 1990s the wreck was rediscovered by two divers from Texel north-east of Vlieland. The ship was identified by her ship's bell. Many copper buckets were found.

In 1995, a diving team from Terschelling dived on the wreck. At the time the stern was clearly visible. Two blades of the propeller stuck out of the sand. The steam boiler and the compound machine were recognizable. Chests were found containing, among others, machetes. The spare anchor was later recovered by divers from Vlieland and is nowadays on display in front of a summer house in Vlieland. Many chests with square jenever bottles were found, many of them were still in good condition. Furthermore, some olive pots, a few guns and many more copper buckets in various sizes were found. A diver from Vlieland found over 80 gold coins. This discovery caused the end of the diving team "Virgo" of Vlieland because the diver did not want to share with his fellow divers.
