= Humber keel =

Type of British square-rigged sailing ship

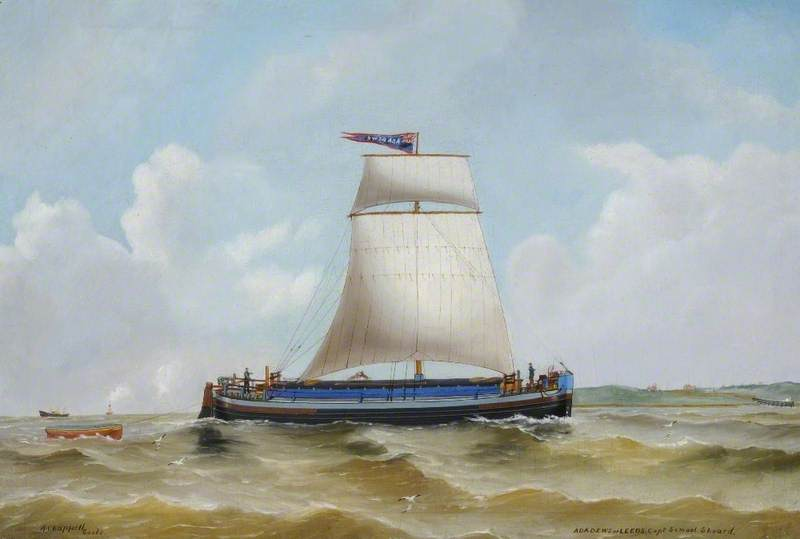
The Humber keel, Ada Dews

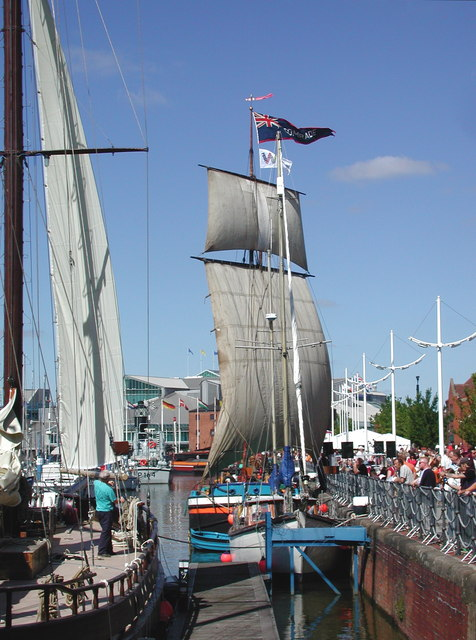
The Humber keel, Comrade, at Hull Marina in 2007

The Humber keel was a type of single-masted, square-rigged sailing craft used for inshore and inland cargo transport around Hull and the Humber Estuary, in the United Kingdom, particularly through the late 19th and early 20th centuries.

== History ==
The square sail arrangement of the Humber keel is most probably a descendant of the Saxon ship of the fifth century AD. The term "keel" is derived from the Anglo-Saxon word "ceol", which referred to a ship built using a longitudinal strengthening beam (keel) together with a single mast and square rigging. The remains of keels from the 13th century have been excavated, and the keel is identified as a specific class of vessel in the Tudor records kept by the Corporation of York. Early keels were designed to work in waterways which were only 3.5 feet (1.1 m) deep, but could still carry 40 to 50 tonnes of cargo. Such boats were clinker-built, meaning that the planks overlapped one another, but this gradually gave way to carvel construction, where the planks join edge to edge. First the bottom of the hull was carvel-built, with the sides still clinker-built, and then the whole boat used the newer method.

== Description ==
Humber keels were constructed to a variety of sizes, between 57 and 68 feet (17 and 21 m) long and between 14.5 and 16.5 feet (4.4 and 5.0 m) wide. These different sizes were dictated by which part of the inland waterway network that the keel was intended to work on, having the maximum size hull that could get through the locks on their intended routes.

They had strongly built hulls with a bluff bow and a flat bottom. The after part of the hull, in the region of the structural keel, was shaped to give a slightly concave run (Note: The run is a descriptive term for the after part of a hull. Its shape determines the behaviour of a vessel as it moves through the water) so that water flowed efficiently past the sternpost and the rudder. Wood was used as the construction material for much of the keel's history. Clinker construction was the norm until the middle of the 19th century, when carvel construction was gradually introduced. Some were built with carvel bottoms and clinker sides. Typically, oak and elm were used for the planking and the timbers, with a keelson (which was a major structural member) possibly of pitch pine, if not, of oak. Timber dimensions were generous, giving a heavily built hull. The wooden keels being built at the beginning of the 20th century had steel keelsons and iron knees. Iron-hulled keels were built in the latter part of the 19th century and steel hulls into the 20th century. The result of this was that in the closing years of working keels, wooden, iron and steel hulled vessels could be found working alongside each other.

In the 20th century, steam and diesel engines replaced sail, with grants available to convert sailing vessels to mechanical power before the Second World War. All of the sailing keels had gone by 1949, but one has been preserved and returned to sail by the Humber Keel and Sloop Preservation Society.

The sailing rig consisted of a single mast on which was set a square mainsail and a topsail. The mast was stepped on a post called a lutchet, which went from the top of the keelson to deck level, where it provided a socket for the mast to sit in. The mast could be lowered and raised by one person operating the winch in the bows. This allowed the keel to go under low bridges. The square sails were carried on yards which were hoisted from the deck when sails were set. In stronger winds, the yards would be hoisted with the sails furled to them with light yarn that would be broken when the sheets were pulled. The mainsail could be doused by hauling on the slabline – a rope from the deck, up to the hounds (the mast at the level of the main yard) and then to the foot of the sail. This would lift the sail up to the yard and take the wind out of it.

One advantage of the design was the ability to sail very close to the wind, which was essential on the narrow waterways on which they plied. They were also very manoeuvrable, and a single person could handle one on narrow and quiet waters. Lateral resistance was provided by a huge pair of leeboards, since the structural keel protruded below the flat bottom of the hull by only a few inches. A topsail was used when they were navigating the canals and rivers, but not usually when they were on the Humber estuary.

The dimensions of these craft were influenced by the gauge, or width, of inland waterways created or modernised during that period. In comparison to the widespread use of the Narrowboat standard, far fewer inland waterways were designed to accommodate the larger Humber Keel gauge vessels. This standard is still used on associated waterways today.
