= SS Thasos =

German steamship (1878-1895)

History

German Empire
- Name: Theben
- Namesake: Thebes
- Owner: Kosmos Line
- Port of registry: Hamburg
- Route: German Empire—South America
- Builder: Reiherstieg Schiffswerfte & Maschinenfabrik, Hamburg
- Yard number: 316
- Launched: March 1879
- Completed: 1878

German Empire
- Name: Thasos
- Namesake: Thasos
- Owner: Deutsche Levante-Linie
- Route: German Empire—Black Sea countries
- Acquired: 1895
- Out of service: 24 October 1895
- Fate: stranded and wrecked near Terschelling, Netherlands

General characteristics
- Tonnage: 1,686 GRT
- Length: 82 m (269 ft)
- Beam: 10 m (32 ft 10 in)
- Installed power: 800 hp (600 kW)
- Propulsion: 2-cylinder compound steam engine, single shaft, one screw

SS Thasos was an 82-metre (269 ft) German cargo steamship, built in 1879 as Theben for Kosmos Line's service between Hamburg and South America. In 1895 the ship was acquired by the Deutsche Levante-Linie and renamed Thasos for their scheduled service to countries around the Black Sea.

On her second voyage to the Black Sea, loaded with a valuable cargo of cane goods, she foundered on 24 October 1895 near Terschelling, Netherlands, due to a navigational error. Three people drowned. Most of the cargo was salvaged and sold, as well as the inventory and the wreck itself.

== Ship details ==
Theben was launched in March 1879 by Reiherstieg Schiffswerfte & Maschinenfabrik in Hamburg for the Kosmos Line, being yard number 316. She was an iron-hulled cargo steamship. The ship was 82 metres (269 ft 0 in) long and had a beam of 10 m (32 ft 10 in). It measured 1,686 gross register tons (GRT). She had a 800 horsepower (600 kW) two-cylinder compound steam engine with a single shaft and one screw.

== Kosmos Line ==
Built for Kosmos Line's regular trade between Hamburg, Antwerp/Le Havre (outward/return) and the west coast of South America, Theben made 35 return voyages on the route, calling at Montevideo, Buenos Aires, Valparaíso, Arica, Islay and Callao.

In 1880, the British government contracted with Kosmos to provide a bi-monthly direct mail service to Port Stanley in the Falkland Islands, to replace the former intermittent arrangements by sailing ship to-and-from Montevideo; and Kosmos ships were also able to carry a small number of passengers. Theben made the second voyage to Port Stanley, carrying the new Governor of the Falkland Islands, Thomas Kerr and his family and entourage.

== Deutsche-Levante-Linie ==
In 1895 the ship was acquired by the Deutsche Levante-Linie for their regular connection to countries around the Black Sea.

=== Fate ===
In October 1895 the ship made for the Levant Line her second voyage from Hamburg via Antwerp, Belgium to the Black Sea under command of Mallingdorf. Before reaching Antwerp on 24 October the ship foundered near Terschelling, the Netherlands. The ship fired flares that were seen by the coast guard. However, many fishing vessels got to the ship before the coast guard. After the ship floated again during high tide, she foundered again. The tugs Adsistent and Hercules tried to refloat the ship but the ship was sinking. The crew started evacuating the ship being full of water. All 27 people went into a lifeboat, but it capsized. Three people drowned, 24 people were rescued by local fishermen. The ship sank. The ship was broken into two pieces. In December the ship was further destroyed during a storm and in the days and week following pieces of wood and cargo washed ashore.

Wreck buoys were placed at the ship, which washed away several times. Fishermen were inconvenienced by the wreck because their nets stuck to it.

==== People ====
The survivors went by train to Hamburg, German Empire where they arrived on 30 October 1895. Two bodies were recovered near Terschelling.

== Aftermath ==
=== Salvage operation ===
An operation to salvage the valuable cargo was initiated. The salvage operation was accepted by the salvage company Zur Mühlen together with several fishermen. An investigation about the situation was started about the state and position of the ship. The vessel was found lying on its side; during high tide at 7 feet (2.1 m) and during low tide at 3 feet (0.91 m). The salvage operation was carried out by diver starting on 4 November including salvaging that day nine barrels, two chests of tea, three chests of fish, a chest of lamps, more chests and other items.

The salvage was hindered after the ship was broken by 19 November, but the salvaging continued on a daily basis. After a storm in December, the ship was buried under the sand and was no longer accessible.

After an investigation by a diver in February was stated that salvaging was still possible at the stern. The bow was collapsed, leaving localized cargo unaccesable. However, there were no further reports that cargo was salvaged. The last dives to the ship were made in June 1896.

==== Sales ====
An initial sale of salvaged items was held on 13 November 1895 in Terschelling, including recovered rice, cacao and biscuit. A consecutive sale with tea and hides was held a week later on 21 November. After salvaging was not longer possible, a last auction was held on 30 January 1896. The total sale of the salvaged goods had a revenue of f2530.20. The wreck and the remaining cargo was sold for f88.

=== Court case ===
From 4 November 1895 the office of the Maritime Board of Inquiry (in German: Seeamt) in Hamburg ruled on who was responsible for the ship's stranding and sinking. Due to the storm, the ship came close to coast of Terschelling. It was found that the vessel misjudged the location of a navigation light and the incident could have been prevented with better navigation. The captain was accused of careless ship management and for not listening to the second mate.

It was also found that the compass was not properly set before departure, and that the drowning of the passengers was caused by premature launching of lifeboats.

=== Rewards ===
The Dutch fishermen Zeeders, Kuiper and De Beer who saved 24 of the 27 people received in November 1895 a reward of ƒ200 from the vice-consul of Germany on behalf of Levant Line.

== Wreck discovery ==
The wreck was re-discovered in 2004. Large pieces of the wreck, as well as beams of ebony and pieces of earthenware were salvaged the same year by ship Ursus.

== See also ==
- Wrecksite.eu (Archived) - A painting and brief record of the vessel
