= HMS Garnet =

British Emerald-class corvette

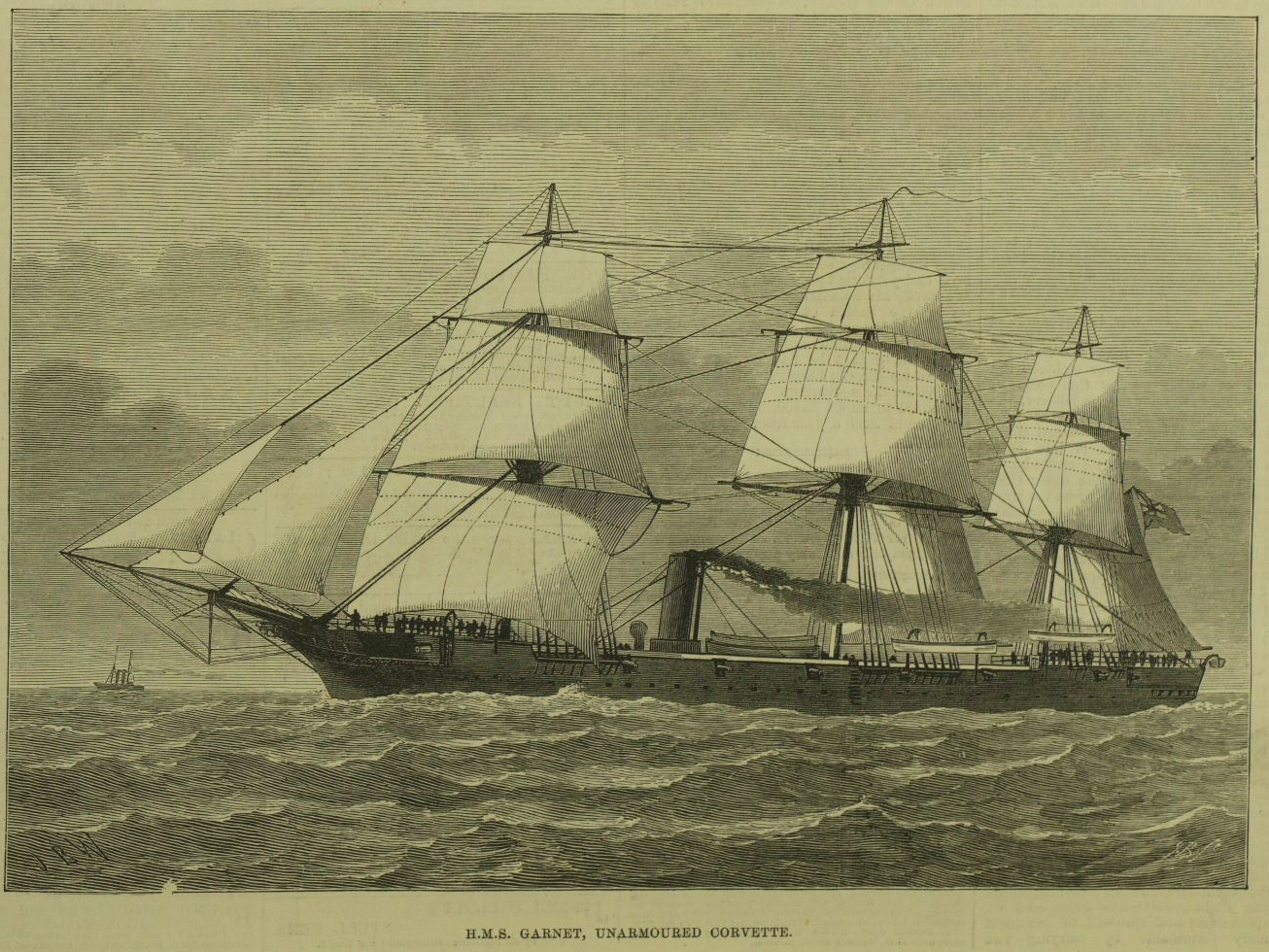
- Garnet in 1878

History

United Kingdom
- Name: HMS Garnet
- Namesake: Garnet
- Builder: Chatham Dockyard
- Laid down: 16 March 1875
- Launched: 30 June 1877
- Completed: 31 October 1878
- Fate: Sold to be broken up, December 1904

General characteristics
- Class & type: Emerald-class corvette
- Displacement: 2,120 tons
- Length: 220 ft (67 m) pp
- Beam: 40 ft (12 m)
- Draught: 18 ft (5.5 m)
- Installed power: 2,000 ihp (1,500 kW)
- Propulsion: 6 × cylindrical boilers; 2-cylinder compound engine; Single screw
- Sail plan: Full-rigged ship (barque from the 1880s)
- Complement: 232
- Armament: 12 × 64-pounder 71-cwt RML guns

HMS Garnet was an Emerald-class composite screw corvette that served in the Victorian Royal Navy. The Emerald class was a development of the wooden Amethyst class but combined an iron frame and teak cladding. Launched in 1877, Garnet was commissioned for service off the coast of America. Between 1878 and 1880, the corvette was commanded by the future Admiral of the Fleet, James Erskine. In 1887, the vessel was deployed on anti-slavery patrols on the Mediterranean Sea and subsequently served in an anti-slavery blockade under the Bacchante class Boadicea. In 1891, the ship operated off the coast of Chile during their Civil War and undertook an unsuccessful search for the crew of the merchant ship Marlborough. The vessel was paid off in 1895 and, in 1899, converted to a coal hulk. In 1904, Garnet was retired and sold to be broken up.

== Design and development ==
The Emerald class was a class of composite screw corvettes designed by Nathaniel Barnaby for the Royal Navy. The ships were a development of the preceding Amethyst class that replaced wooden construction with one that combined frames and keels of wrought iron, a stem and stern post of cast iron and a cladding of teak. The additional longitudinal strength of the metal frames were designed to afford the opportunity to build in finer lines, and thus higher speeds. The ships did not deliver this better performance, partly due to poor underwater design, and also were prone to oscillate in heavy weather. In service, however, they proved to be good sailing vessels in harsh weather. The ships were later redefined as third-class cruisers. Garnet was the last of the class to be laid down.

The corvette had a length of 220 ft (67 m), with a beam of 40 ft (12 m) and draught of 18 ft (5.5 m). Displacement was 2,120 long tons (2,150 t). The engines were provided by Hawthorn. The ship was equipped with six cylindrical boilers feeding a compound engine consisting of two cylinders, working on low and high pressure respectively, rated at 2,000 indicated horsepower (1,500 kW). The engines drove a single shaft, to give a design speed of 13.2 knots (24.4 km/h; 15.2 mph). Range for the class varied between 2,000 and 2,280 nautical miles (3,700 and 4,220 km; 2,300 and 2,620 mi) at 10 knots (19 km/h; 12 mph). The steam engine was complemented by 18,250 sq ft (1,695 m^{2}) of sail, which was ship-rigged. Between 1880 and 1890, this was altered to a barque rig.

Garnet had an armament consisting of 12 slide-mounted 64-pounder rifled muzzle-loading (RML) guns. Five were mounted to each side to provide a broadside, the remainder being fitted in pairs firing through embrasures at each end of the ship. The arrangement was simpler and lighter than the rest of the class. The guns were later replaced by 14 5 in (130 mm) breech-loading (BL) weapons. While retaining the five allocated to each broadside, the new arrangement had the advantage of providing four chase guns between the poop deck and the topgallant forecastle. The ship had a complement of 232 officers and ratings.

== Construction and career ==
Laid down at Chatham Dockyard on 16 March 1875, Garnet was launched on 30 June 1877 and was completed on 31 October 1878. The corvette was the last of the class to enter service and, at a cost £92,468, the least expensive. The vessel was the second to be given the name, which recalled a garnet, one of a number of gemstones.

The corvette was commissioned at Chatham for service off the southeast coast of America. Between October 1878 and May 1880, the ship was commanded by James Erskine, later Admiral of the Fleet.

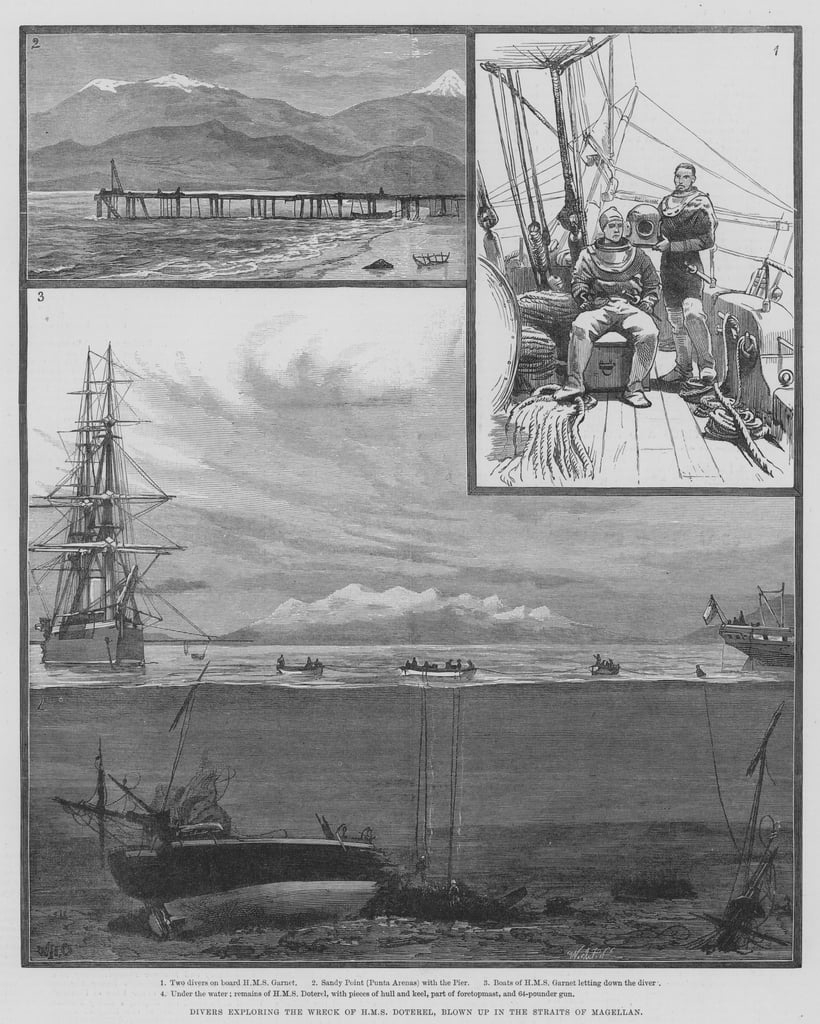
Divers exploring the wreck of HMS Doterel from the Garnet, in the Straits of Magellan, off Punta Arenas. Illustrated London News 1881

In 1882, the vessel was sent to Sheerness and paid off, but returned to service in the same area of Atlantic coast in September that year under the command of Victor Montagu. The ship served in North America and the West Indies.

On 23 August 1887, the vessel was commissioned for service in the East Indies following another period in Sheerness. Garnet was sent to the Mediterranean Sea on anti-slavery patrols against slaving ships operating off the Barbary Coast. Occasionally these led to conflict. For example, after a confrontation, a crew in one of the ship's boats dispatched to destroy the crippled dhow was attacked, three were wounded and the lieutenant was killed. Following that, the ship served in a blockade as part of a flotilla under the Bacchante class Boadicea.

In 1890, the corvette was recommissioned in Malta for service in the Pacific Ocean. The vessel operated close to the coastline of Chile during the following year. Following a report in The Daily Colonist on 9 April, the ship was sent to Good Success Bay, Tierra del Fuego, in search of the lost crew of the merchant ship Marlborough. No evidence of the sailors was found. On 31 July, the crew of the ship was censured by the Chilean press for firing their guns unnecessarily and causing confusion amongst the forces of the Chilean Civil War. In April 1895, Garnet returned to Chatham and was paid off. In October 1899, the vessel was sent to Devonport to be converted to a coal hulk, serving in this capacity until 1904. In December 1904, the ship was retired and sold to be broken up.
