= HMS Turquoise (1876) =

British Emerald-class corvette

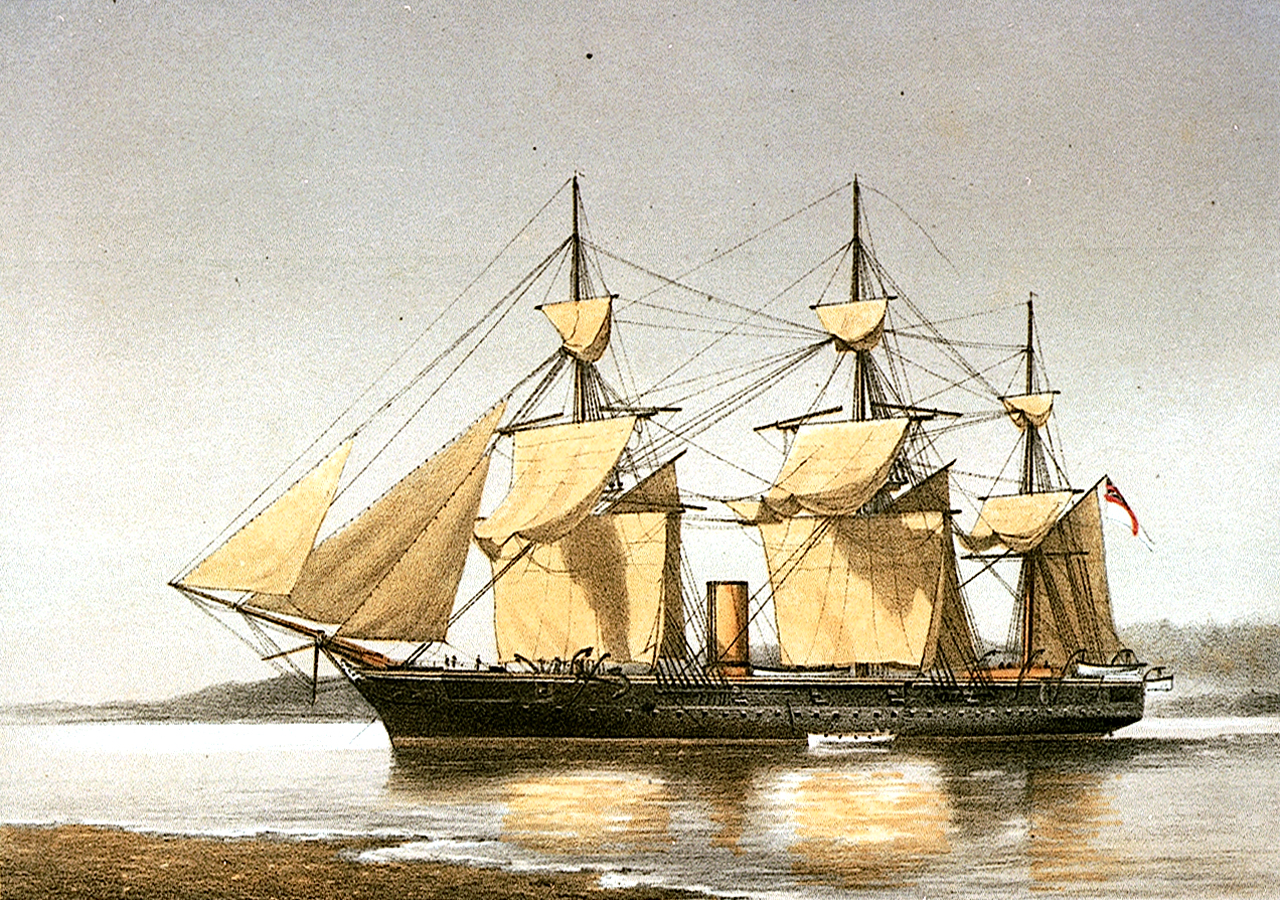
- Turquoise in 1880

History

United Kingdom
- Name: HMS Turquoise
- Namesake: Turquoise
- Builder: Earle's Shipbuilding, Hull
- Laid down: 8 July 1874
- Launched: 22 April 1876
- Completed: 13 September 1876
- Fate: Sold to be broken up, 24 September 1892

General characteristics
- Class & type: Emerald-class corvette
- Displacement: 2,120 long tons (2,150 t)
- Length: 220 ft (67 m) pp
- Beam: 40 ft (12 m)
- Draught: 18 ft (5.5 m)
- Installed power: 6 × cylindrical boilers, 2,000 ihp (1,500 kW)
- Propulsion: 2-cylinder compound engine, single screw
- Sail plan: Full-rigged ship (barque from the 1880s)
- Speed: 12.32 knots (22.82 km/h; 14.18 mph)
- Complement: 230
- Armament: 12 × 64-pounder 71-cwt RML guns

HMS Turquoise was an Emerald-class composite screw corvette that served in the Victorian Royal Navy. The Emerald class was a development of the wooden Amethyst class but combined an iron frame and teak cladding. Launched in 1876, Turquoise was active during the War of the Pacific in 1879 and 1880, reporting the sinking of the Chilean corvette Esmeralda during the Battle of Iquique. The ship was subsequently deployed to the Sultanate of Zanzibar on anti-slavery patrols. Turquoise captured five slave ships between 1884 and 1885 and ten between 1886 and 1890, releasing hundreds of slaves in the process. During one encounter, a slave ship rammed one of the ship's boats, but the crew still managed to sink the vessel and free 53 slaves. In 1890, the crew of the corvette joined an expeditionary force sent to Witu that successfully suppressed the slave trade in the area. In 1892, Turquoise was retired and sold to be broken up.

== Design and development ==
The Emerald class was a class of composite screw corvettes designed by Nathaniel Barnaby for the Royal Navy. The ships were a development of the preceding Amethyst class that replaced wooden construction with one that combined frames and keels of wrought iron, a stem and stern post of cast iron and a cladding of teak. The additional longitudinal strength of the metal frames was designed to afford the opportunity to build in finer lines, and thus higher speeds. The ships did not deliver this better performance, partly due to poor underwater design, and also were prone to oscillate in heavy weather. In service, however, they proved to be good sailing vessels in all sorts of weather. The ships were later redefined as third-class cruisers.

The corvette had a length between perpendiculars of 220 ft (67 m), with a beam of 40 ft (12 m) and draught of 18 ft (5.5 m). Displacement was 2,120 long tons (2,150 t). The engines were provided by Hawthorn. The ship was equipped with six cylindrical boilers feeding a compound engine consisting of two cylinders, working on low and high pressure respectively, rated at 2,000 indicated horsepower (1,500 kW). The engines drove a single shaft, to give a design speed of 13.2 knots (24.4 km/h; 15.2 mph). The vessel achieved 12.32 knots (22.82 km/h; 14.18 mph) from 1,994 indicated horsepower (1,487 kW). Range for the class varied between 2,000 and 2,280 nautical miles (3,700 and 4,220 km; 2,300 and 2,620 mi) at 10 knots (19 km/h; 12 mph). The steam engine was complemented by 18,250 sq ft (1,695 m^{2}) of sail, which was ship-rigged. This proved difficult to handle as it meant the vessel was too responsive to weather. Between 1880 and 1890, this was altered to a barque rig.

Turquoise had an armament consisting of 12 slide-mounted 64-pounder rifled muzzle-loading (RML) guns. Five were mounted to each side to provide a broadside, the remainder being fitted in pairs firing through embrasures at the ends of the ship. The ship had a complement of 230 officers and ratings.

== Construction and career ==
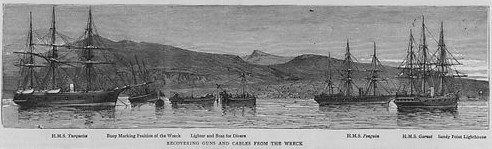
Turquoise assisting in the recovery of guns and cables from the wreck of HMS Dotorel, The Graphic 1881

Laid down by Earle's Shipbuilding at their shipyard in Kingston upon Hull on 8 July 1874 alongside sister ship Ruby, Turquoise was launched on 22 April 1876 and was completed on 13 September 1876 at a cost of £95,547. The warship was the second of the class to enter service. After experiencing repeated engine failure that delayed commissioning for a year, the vessel finally being commissioned at Sheerness in 13 September 1877. The warship was the first in Royal Navy service to be given the name, which recalled the gemstone turquoise.

Initially sailing to San Francisco, arriving on 7 July 1878, the corvette was then sent to the Pacific Ocean in response to the War of the Pacific. The vessel observed the conflict between Chile and Peru, including reporting the sinking of the Chilean corvette Esmeralda at the Battle of Iquique on 21 May 1879. The ship remained there, often as part an international force with representation from France and the US, into the following year, sometimes acting as a hospital ship carrying the injured to safety.

Subsequently, the ship was transferred to the Sultanate of Zanzibar and served in the Indian Ocean on patrols to combat the Indian Ocean slave trade. As the years passed, the crew noted an increase in the number of slave traders. Between 1884 and 1885, Turquoise captured five slave ships. One of the more successful was the capture of a Burmese man-of-war on the Irrawaddy River. The anti-slavery patrols did prove increasingly successful and step by step the slave trade ran down. Between 1886 and 1890, Turquoise captured ten slave ships, each potentially leading to the release of over 100 slaves. The capture of the dhow Mutashal off Ras Kinjoge on 15 April was typical as 40 slaves were freed. Occasionally these led to conflict. For example, on 30 May 1887, in a confrontation, a crew in one of the ship's boats was rammed by a slaving dhow. The British crew boarded the slave ship and, despite that vessel capsizing in the fight, rescued 53 slaves without a British sailor being killed. Turquoise also hosted Thomas Stevens on his search for the Emin Pasha Relief Expedition led by Henry Morton Stanley, returning him to Zanzibar in December 1889.

On 1 January 1890 the anti-slavery effort was cemented with the statement that all people born in Zanzibar were free. To enforce this, the Royal Navy was called upon to support local troops and those of the British Army. On 21 October 1890 the crew of the corvette joined an expeditionary force under Vice-admiral Edmund Fremantle sent to Witu to dissuade the people there from slave trading by force if necessary. The mission was a success, led to an almost complete cessation of the slave trade in the area and caused no casualties amongst the crew. The vessel subsequently returned to the UK. On 24 September 1892, the ship was retired and sold to be broken up by Pounds of Hartlepool.
