= HMS Ruby (1876) =

British Emerald-class corvette

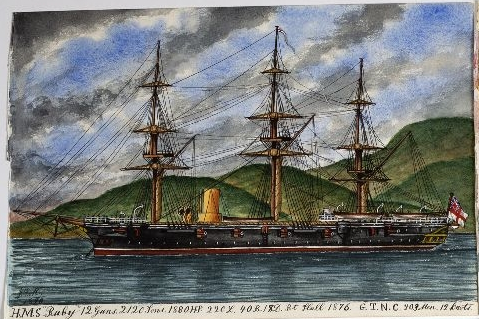
- Ruby

History

United Kingdom
- Name: HMS Ruby
- Builder: Earle's Shipbuilding, Hull
- Laid down: 8 July 1874
- Launched: 9 August 1876
- Completed: 14 June 1877
- Out of service: Converted to a coal hulk in December 1904
- Fate: Sold as a coal hulk in February 1921; Broken up in 1925

General characteristics
- Class & type: Emerald-class corvette
- Displacement: 2,120 long tons (2,150 t)
- Length: 220 ft (67 m) pp
- Beam: 40 ft (12 m)
- Draught: 18 ft (5.5 m)
- Installed power: 2,000 ihp (1,500 kW)
- Propulsion: 6 × cylindrical boilers; 2-cylinder compound engine; Single screw
- Sail plan: Full-rigged ship (barque from the 1880s)
- Complement: 232
- Armament: 12 × 64-pounder 71-cwt RML guns

HMS Ruby was an Emerald-class composite screw corvette that served in the Victorian Royal Navy. The Emerald class was a development of the wooden Amethyst class but combined an iron frame and teak cladding. Launched in 1876, Ruby was commissioned to the East Indies Station, serving between Burma, Ceylon, Madras and other important parts of the British Empire. Transferred to operating in the Mediterranean Sea, the vessel supported humanitarian efforts during the 1878 Macedonian rebellion and then the British forces during the Anglo-Egyptian War of 1882. The corvette served in the South East Coast of America Station from 1885, retiring in 1904. After a period as a coal hulk at Sheerness with the name C 10, she was Ruby was sold in 1921 to be broken up.

== Design and development ==
The Emerald class was a class of composite screw corvettes designed by Nathaniel Barnaby for the Royal Navy. The ships were a development of the preceding Amethyst class that replaced wooden construction with one that combined frames and keels of wrought iron, a stem and stern post of cast iron and a cladding of teak. The additional longitudinal strength of the metal frames was designed to afford the opportunity to build in finer lines, and thus achieve higher speeds. The ships did not deliver this better performance, partly due to poor underwater design, and also were prone to oscillate in heavy weather. In service, however, they proved to be good sailing vessels in all sorts of weather. The ships were later redefined as third-class cruisers.

The corvette had a length between perpendiculars of 220 ft (67 m), with a beam of 40 ft (12 m) and draught of 18 ft (5.5 m). Displacement was 2,120 long tons (2,150 t). The engines were provided by Hawthorn. The ship was equipped with six cylindrical boilers feeding a compound engine consisting of two cylinders, working on low and high pressure respectively, rated at 2,000 indicated horsepower (1,500 kW). The engines drove a single shaft, to give a design speed of 13.2 knots (24.4 km/h; 15.2 mph). In trials, the vessel achieved 12.28 knots (22.74 km/h; 14.13 mph) from 2,018 indicated horsepower (1,505 kW). Range for the class varied between 2,000 and 2,280 nautical miles (3,700 and 4,220 km; 2,300 and 2,620 mi) at 10 knots (19 km/h; 12 mph). The steam engine was complemented by 18,250 sq ft (1,695 m^{2}) of sail, which was ship-rigged. This proved difficult to handle as it meant the vessel was too responsive to weather. Between 1880 and 1890, this was altered to a barque rig.

Ruby had an armament consisting of 12 slide-mounted 64-pounder rifled muzzle-loading (RML) guns. Five were mounted to each side to provide a broadside, the remainder being fitted in pairs firing through embrasures at the ends of the ship. The ship had a complement of 232 officers and ratings.

== Construction and career ==
Laid down by Earle's Shipbuilding at their shipyard in Kingston upon Hull on 8 July 1874 alongside sister ship Turquoise, Ruby was launched on 9 August 1876 and was completed on 14 June 1877 at a cost of £93,116. The warship was the third of the class to enter service and the ninth to be given the name, the first recorded use being in 1596.

Ruby was commissioned to the East Indies Station. Amongst the crew was future Admiral of the Fleet George Callaghan. The vessel was stationed at Trincomalee in Ceylon. On 28 November 1877, the corvette arrived at Port Blair, staying for two days before sailing on to Rangoon in Burma. The vessel returned on 23 February 1878, departing for Madras on 3 March. Ruby carried one of only two batches of mail sent between Port Blair and Madras in the two years. Shortly afterwards, the corvette was transferred to the Mediterranean. On 27 March, Ruby responded to a request from women and children in Macedonia suffering during the 1878 Macedonian rebellion. On 30 May, the ship was deployed to Singapore to join the China Squadron. The corvette subsequently returned to the Mediterranean and, by September, was supporting the British forces during a military expedition to Egypt. On 24 October the warship left Alexandria and sailed to Malta.

After briefly supporting the British Army in the Anglo-Egyptian War, on 12 November 1882, Ruby returned to the UK. After an extensive refit, the vessel was recommissioned and sailed for the South East Coast of America Station on 2 May 1885, arriving on 18 June in Rio de Janeiro.

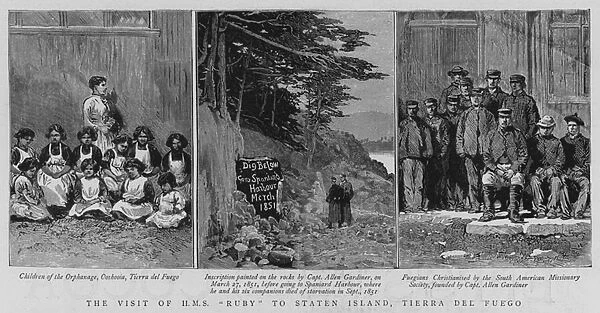
The Visit of HMS Ruby to Staten Island, Tierra del Fuego. The Graphic 1888

The corvette was the lead of the flotilla commanded by the future Admiral of the Fleet Charles Hotham. The vessel subsequently returned to the UK. In December 1904, the ship was retired and turned into a coal hulk with the name C.10. During February 1921, the ship was sold and then continued in coaling service, with Hoare, Gothard and Bond at Dover, reverting to Ruby. On 16 June 1925 the hulk was towed into the Stanlee Shipbreaking & Salvage Company's yard at Dover for demolition.
