= HMS Tourmaline (1875) =

British Emerald-class corvette

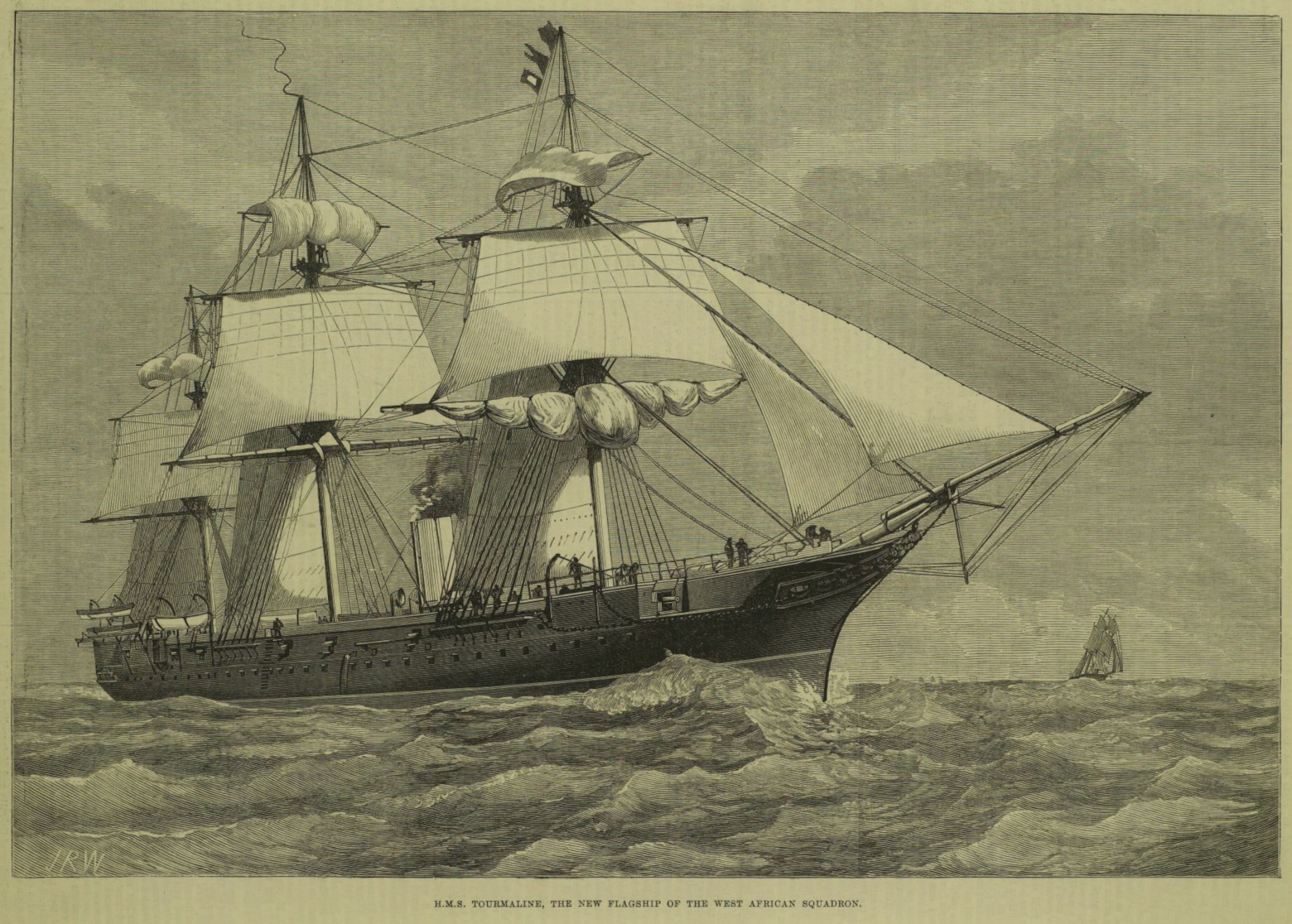
- Tourmaline in 1876

History

United Kingdom
- Name: HMS Tourmaline
- Namesake: Tourmaline
- Builder: Raylton Dixon, Middlesbrough
- Laid down: 17 July 1874
- Launched: 30 October 1875
- Completed: October 1876
- Fate: Sold to be broken up, November 1920

General characteristics (as built)
- Class & type: Emerald-class corvette
- Displacement: 2,120 long tons (2,150 t)
- Length: 220 ft (67 m) pp
- Beam: 40 ft (12 m)
- Draught: 18 ft (5.5 m)
- Installed power: 2,000 ihp (1,500 kW)
- Propulsion: 6 × cylindrical boilers; 2-cylinder compound engine; Single screw
- Sail plan: Full-rigged ship (barque from the 1880s)
- Complement: 230
- Armament: 12 × 64-pounder RML guns

HMS Tourmaline was an Emerald-class corvette that served in the Royal Navy during the Victorian era. The Emerald class was a development of the wooden Amethyst class but combined an iron frame and teak cladding. Launched in 1875, Tourmaline was deployed to the North America and West Indies Station in 1878. The screw corvette joined the third flying squadron in 1880, sailing to South Africa at time of the First Boer War and then to Australia, Japan, Singapore and Egypt, arriving in Alexandria in time to participate in the Anglo-Egyptian War. During 1883, the corvette was stationed in Zanzibar and then, in response to the Franco-Hova Wars, was the senior officer's ship in Madagascar. Following an armament upgrade, the vessel returned to the North America and West Indies Station in 1886. Converted to a coal hulk in 1899, Tourmaline was sold in 1920 to be broken up.

== Design and development ==
The Emerald class was a class of screw corvettes designed by Nathaniel Barnaby for the Royal Navy. The ships were a development of the preceding Amethyst class that replaced wooden construction with a composite one that combined frames and keels of wrought iron, a stem and stern post of cast iron and a cladding of teak. The additional longitudinal strength of the metal frames was designed to afford the opportunity to build in finer lines, and thus higher speeds. The ships did not deliver this better performance, partly due to poor underwater design, and also were prone to oscillate in heavy weather. In service, however, they proved to be good sailing vessels in all sorts of weather. The ships were later redefined as third-class cruisers.

The corvette had a length between perpendiculars of 220 ft (67 m), with a beam of 40 ft (12 m) and draught of 18 ft (5.5 m). Displacement was 2,120 long tons (2,150 t). The engines were provided by Hawthorn. The ship was equipped with six cylindrical boilers feeding a compound engine consisting of two cylinders, working on low and high pressure respectively, rated at 2,000 indicated horsepower (1,500 kW). The engines drove a single shaft, to give a design speed of 13.2 knots (24.4 km/h; 15.2 mph). The vessel achieved 12.62 knots (23.37 km/h; 14.52 mph) from 1,972 indicated horsepower (1,471 kW). Range for the class varied between 2,000 and 2,280 nautical miles (3,700 and 4,220 km; 2,300 and 2,620 mi) at 10 knots (19 km/h; 12 mph). The steam engines used in the class were troublesome, and the one in Tourmaline was so far from satisfactory that the chief engineer committed suicide. The engine was complemented by 18,250 sq ft (1,695 m^{2}) of sail, which was ship-rigged. This proved difficult to handle as it meant the vessel was too responsive to weather. Between 1880 and 1890, this was altered to a barque rig.

Tourmaline had an armament consisting of 12 64-pounder slide-mounted rifled muzzle-loading (RML) guns. Five were mounted to each side to provide a broadside, the remainder being fitted in pairs firing through embrasures at the ends of the ship. The guns were provided by the Ordinance Department at Chatham Dockyard. Between 31 August 1884 and 10 August 1885, the armament was upgraded to four 6 in (150 mm) 100 pounder breech loading (BL) guns mounted behind shields and a broadside of eight 5 in (130 mm) 50 pounder BL guns. The ship had a complement of 230 officers and ratings.

== Construction and career ==
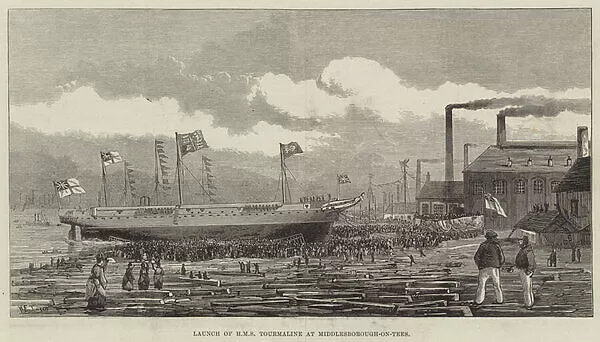
Launch of Tourmaline in 1875

Laid down by Raylton Dixon's shipyard in Middlesbrough on 17 July 1874, Tourmaline was launched on 30 August the following year. The vessel cost £95,769 and was the first of the class to enter service. The warship was commissioned on 25 October 1876 and arrived in Simon's Town, South Africa, on 29 January 1877. The ship required further work before becoming operational and so returned to the UK, arriving in Plymouth on 22 August. Faults included limitations to the use of the engine that meant it was barely usable. On 31 January 1878, the corvette was ready for service and was dispatched to join the North America and West Indies Station. Tourmaline returned to the UK, arriving at Sheerness Dockyard on 12 September 1880 for a short refit.

On 2 November, the warship sailed to join third flying squadron under the command of the Earl of Clanwilliam at Madeira. The ships sailed via St Vincent, Cape Verde, where the corvette took on 120 long tons (120 t) of coal, and arrived at Port Stanley in the Falkland Islands on 9 January. However, the start of the First Boer War meant that the ship was dispatched back to Simon's Town, arriving 22 days later. The vessel took no part in the conflict but did contribute 21 shots of a 105 gun salute to mark the assassination of Alexander II of Russia. From South Africa, the squadron proceeded to Australia, spending the summer in Melbourne, Sydney and Brisbane. The allure of the colony, and the opportunity that the gold rush then ensuing provided, meant that 30 sailors deserted during the time. From there, the vessels sailed via Fiji and Nauru to Japan, arriving in Yokohama in October. The ships then sailed through Wusong, Xiamen, Hong Kong and Singapore, returning to Simon's Town and then to Gibraltar, arriving on 1 July 1881. From there, the ship was dispatched to Alexandria to engage in the Anglo-Egyptian War. The vessel was involved in the bombardment and surrender of Abu Qir Bay on 20 August.

On 10 September 1883, Tourmaline was transferred to serve in the Indian Ocean on patrols to combat the Indian Ocean slave trade from a base in the Sultanate of Zanzibar. The vessel was in attendance when the sultan was invested into the Order of St Michael and St George. After a refit in Bombay that cost £25,000, the ship sailed to Toamasina, Madagascar, on 13 December 1883 in response to the Franco-Hova Wars. The vessel acted as senior officer's ship to the country, transporting the consul-general on diplomatic missions. Tourmaline returned to Sheerness Dockyard on 31 October 1884 to be broken up. Instead, a refit costing £39,833 was authorised, including updating the armament with 5 in (130 mm) BL guns, the vessel being recommissioned on 12 August 1886 to rejoin the North America and West Indies Station. On 15 August 1889, the corvette visited New York. Unusually for the time, the crew were given shore leave. Tourmaline was converted to a coal hulk in 1899, renamed C.115 in December 1904, and eventually sold to be broken up in November 1920.
