= HMS Amethyst (1873) =

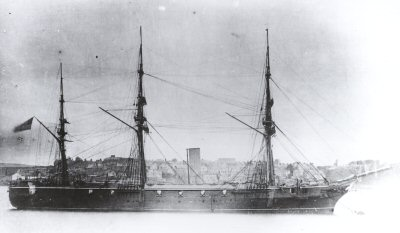
- Amethyst at anchor

History

United Kingdom
- Name: HMS Amethyst
- Namesake: Amethyst
- Builder: Devonport Dockyard
- Cost: Approximately £77,000
- Laid down: 1872
- Launched: 19 April 1873
- Completed: July 1873
- Fate: Sold for scrap, November 1887

General characteristics (as built)
- Class & type: Amethyst-class wooden screw corvette
- Displacement: 1,934 long tons (1,965 t)
- Tons burthen: 1,405 bm
- Length: 220 ft (67.1 m) (p/p)
- Beam: 37 ft (11.3 m)
- Draught: 18 ft (5.5 m)
- Installed power: 2,144 ihp (1,599 kW)
- Propulsion: 1 × shaft; 1 × 2-cylinder compound expansion steam engine; 6 × cylindrical boilers
- Sail plan: Ship rig
- Speed: 13 knots (24 km/h; 15 mph)
- Range: 2,060–2,500 nmi (3,820–4,630 km; 2,370–2,880 mi) at 10 knots (19 km/h; 12 mph)
- Complement: 225
- Armament: 12 × 64-pounder (160 mm) 71-cwt rifled muzzle-loading guns; 2 × 64-pounder (160 mm) 64-cwt rifled muzzle-loading guns

HMS Amethyst was the lead ship of the Amethyst-class corvettes built for the Royal Navy in the early 1870s. She participated in the Third Anglo-Ashanti War in 1873 before serving as the senior officer's ship for the South American side of the South Atlantic. The ship was transferred to the Pacific Station in 1875 and fought in the Battle of Pacocha against the rebellious Peruvian ironclad warship Huáscar two years later. This made her the only British wooden sailing ship ever to fight an armoured opponent. After a lengthy refit, Amethyst again served as the senior officer's ship on the South American station from 1882 to 1885. She was sold for scrap two years later.

== Design and description ==
Amethyst was 220 feet (67.1 m) long between perpendiculars, had a beam of 37 feet (11.3 m) and a draught of 18 feet (5.5 m). The ship displaced 1,934 long tons (1,965 t) and had a burthen of 1,405 tons. Her crew consisted of 225 officers and ratings. Unlike her iron-hulled contemporaries, the ship's wooden hull prevented any use of watertight transverse bulkheads.

The ship had one two-cylinder horizontal compound expansion steam engine made by J. & G. Rennie, driving a single 15-foot (4.6 m) propeller. Six cylindrical boilers provided steam to the engine at a working pressure of 60 psi (414 kPa; 4 kgf/cm^{2}). The engine produced a total of 2,144 indicated horsepower (1,599 kW) which gave Amethyst a maximum speed of 13.244 knots (24.528 km/h; 15.241 mph) during her sea trials. The ship carried 270 long tons (270 t) of coal, enough to steam between 2,060–2,500 nautical miles (3,820–4,630 km; 2,370–2,880 mi) at 10 knots (19 km/h; 12 mph). Amethyst was ship rigged and had a sail area of 18,000 square feet (1,672 m^{2}). The lower masts were made of iron, but the other masts were wood. The ship, and her sisters, were excellent sailors and their best speed under sail alone was approximately that while under steam. Ballard says that all the ships of this class demonstrated "excellent qualities of handiness, steadiness and seaworthiness". Her propeller could be hoisted up into the stern of the ship to reduce drag while under sail. During her refit in 1878, Amethyst was re-rigged as a barque.

The ship was initially armed with a mix of 64-pounder 71-cwt (Note: "cwt" is the abbreviation for hundredweight, 64 cwt referring to the weight of the gun.) and 64-cwt rifled muzzle-loading guns. The twelve 71-cwt guns were mounted on the broadside while the two lighter 64-cwt guns were mounted underneath the forecastle and poop deck as chase guns. In 1878, the ship's 71-cwt guns were replaced by 64-cwt guns.

== Service ==
Amethyst was laid down at Devonport Dockyard on 28 July 1871. She was launched on 19 April 1873 and completed in July 1873. Her sisters cost approximately £77,000 each. The ship was first assigned as the senior officer's ship for the South American side of the South Atlantic, but she was diverted en route to Ghana to support British forces during the Third Anglo-Ashanti War.

Amethyst remained on the South American station until she was transferred to the Pacific Station in 1875 after she was relieved by Volage.

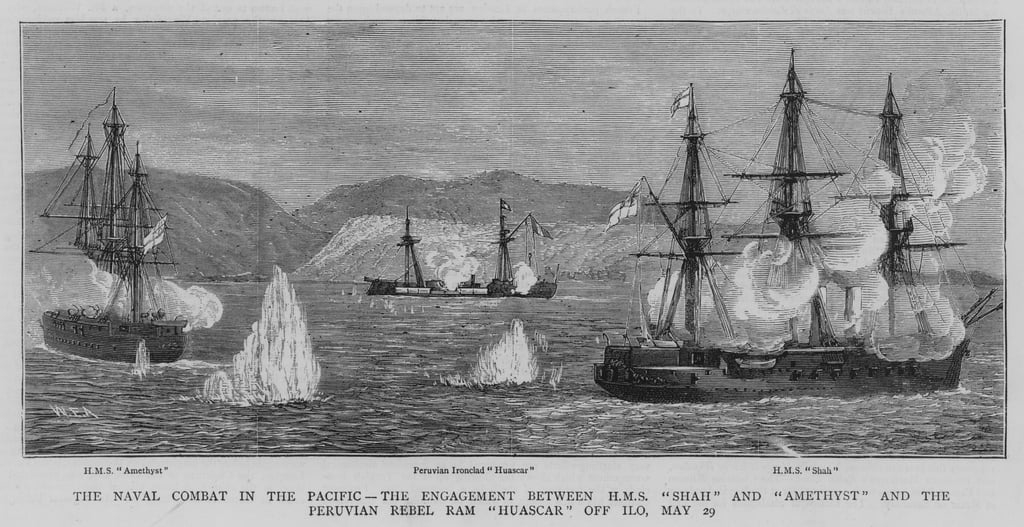
Amethyst (far left) and HMS Shah during the engagement with the Huascar off Ilo, 29 May 1877

In May 1877, the crew of the Peruvian ironclad Huáscar rebelled against the government and began harassing British shipping. Amethyst and the unarmored frigate Shah were ordered to capture the rebel ship and finally found her in the late afternoon of 29 May off the port of Ilo. After Huáscar refused an offer to surrender, the British ships fired upon her in what came to be known as the Battle of Pacocha. Shah's deep draught forced her to keep to seaward, therefore Amethyst was ordered into shallower inshore waters south of the Peruvian ironclad to deter her from escaping into neutral Chilean waters. The corvette's 64-pounder guns were unable to significantly damage the ironclad, but her opponent's gunnery was atrocious and neither British ship suffered more than some damage to their rigging. Huáscar escaped with little damage after nightfall and surrendered to the Peruvian government the following day. Amethyst was tasked with rescuing the 43 survivors of the wreck of the British steamship Eten at Los Velos Point, Chile on 15 July. She was unable to do so due to the weather conditions at the time.

Amethyst returned home in July 1878 for a lengthy refit and was recommissioned in 1882 to return as the senior officer's ship for southeastern South America until she returned in late 1885 and was paid off. The ship was sold for scrap in November 1887.

== Bibliography ==
- Ballard, G. A. (1937). "British Corvettes of 1875: The Last Wooden class". Mariner's Mirror. 23 (October). Cambridge, UK: Society for Nautical Research: 435–45.
- Gardiner, Robert, ed. (1979). Conway's All the World's Fighting Ships 1860–1905. London: Conway Maritime Press. ISBN 0-8317-0302-4.
- Wilson, H. W. (1896). Ironclads in Action: A Sketch of Naval Warfare From 1855 to 1895. Vol. 1 and 2. Boston: Little, Brown.
- Lyon, David & Winfield, Rif (2004). The Sail and Steam Navy List: All the Ships of the Royal Navy 1815–1889. Chatham Publishing. ISBN 978-1-86176-032-6. OCLC 52620555.
