= Emerald-class corvette =

Type of ship built in the 1870s

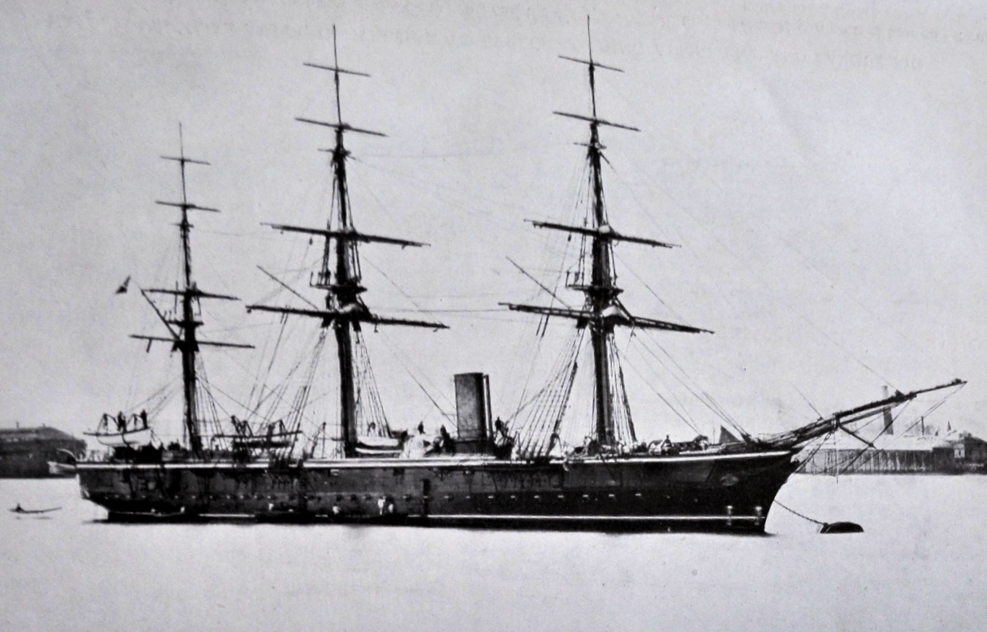
- Turquoise at anchor

Class overview
- Name: Emerald class
- Operators: Royal Navy
- Preceded by: HMS Rover
- Succeeded by: Bacchante class
- Built: 1873–1878
- Completed: 6
- Scrapped: 6

General characteristics (as built)
- Type: Composite screw corvette
- Displacement: 2,120 long tons (2,150 t)
- Tons burthen: 1,864 bm
- Length: 220 ft (67.1 m) (p/p)
- Beam: 40 ft (12.2 m)
- Draught: 18 ft (5.5 m)
- Installed power: 2,031–2,364 ihp (1,515–1,763 kW)
- Propulsion: 1 shaft; 1 × 2-cylinder compound-expansion steam engine; 6 cylindrical boilers
- Sail plan: Ship rig
- Speed: 12–13 knots (22–24 km/h; 14–15 mph)
- Range: 2,000–2,280 nmi (3,700–4,220 km; 2,300–2,620 mi) at 10 knots (19 km/h; 12 mph)
- Complement: 230
- Armament: 10 × 64-pounder 71-cwt rifled muzzle-loading (RML) guns; 2 × 64-pounder 64-cwt RML guns

The Emerald-class corvettes were a class of six composite screw corvettes built for the Royal Navy in the mid-1870s. The Opal was built by contract under the 1873-74 Programme, and Turquoise, Ruby, Tourmaline and Emerald under the 1874-75 Programme - the first three also by contract, while Emerald was dockyard-built at Pembroke. The final ship (Garnet) was also dockyard-built at Chatham under the 1875-76 Programme.

== Design and construction ==
The construction used iron frames, with wooden cladding around the frames. These were two-decked ships, with the ordnance on the upper deck and accommodation on the main deck below. They were designed to carry the same armament of fourteen 64-pdr guns as the preceding Amethyst class corvettes from which their design was developed, with two of the guns mounted on rotating slides as bow and stern chasers, and the other twelve guns slide-mounted on the broadsides.

However, only Opal was so completed, and two of her broadside guns were removed following her first commission. Tourmaline was built with the same number of ports, but with only ten broadside guns vice twelve (plus the two chase guns). The other four vessels were completed with this ordnance (two chasers and ten broadside guns, without ports for a sixth pair of broadside guns) - all these guns being of the 64cwt model. In the early 1880s Tourmaline and Emerald were re-armed with four 6-inch (100-pdr) and eight 5-inch (50-pdr) breach-loader guns.

== Ships ==
Ship	Builder	Laid down	Launched	Completed	Fate	Cost
Opal	William Doxford, Sunderland	13 October 1873	9 March 1875	January 1876	Sold for scrap, 11 August 1892	£95,949
Turquoise	Earle's Shipbuilding, Hull	8 July 1874	22 April 1876	13 September 1876	Sold for scrap, 24 September 1892	£95,547
Ruby	Earle's Shipbuilding, Hull	8 July 1874	9 August 1876	14 June 1877	Converted to coal hulk, December 1904; sold for scrap, 16 February 1921	£93,116
Tourmaline	Raylton Dixon, Middlesbrough	17 July 1874	30 October 1875	January 1874	Converted to coal hulk, 1899; sold for scrap, November 1920	£95,769
Emerald	Pembroke Dockyard	29 July 1874	18 August 1876	2 July 1878	Converted to powder hulk, 1898; sold for scrap, 10 July 1906	£98,442
Garnet	Chatham Dockyard	16 March 1875	30 June 1877	31 October 1878	Sold for scrap, December 1904	£92,468

== Bibliography ==
- Ballard, G. A. (1937). "British Corvettes of 1875: The Six Composite Corvettes". Mariner's Mirror. 23 (April). Cambridge, UK: Society for Nautical Research: 176–89.
- Chesneau, Roger; Kolesnik, Eugene M., eds. (1979). Conway's All the World's Fighting Ships 1860–1905. Greenwich, UK: Conway Maritime Press. ISBN 0-8317-0302-4.
- Winfield, R.; Lyon, D. (2004). The Sail and Steam Navy List: All the Ships of the Royal Navy 1815–1889. London: Chatham Publishing. ISBN 978-1-86176-032-6. OCLC 52620555.
