= HMS Encounter =

Six ships of the English Navy or the Royal Navy have borne the name Encounter or HMS Encounter:

- Encounter (1616) was a discovery vessel in service in 1616.
- HMS Encounter (1805) was a 12-gun gun-brig launched in 1805 and wrecked in 1812.
- HMS Encounter (1846) was an early wooden screw corvette launched in 1846 and broken up in 1866.
- HMS Encounter (1873) was an Amethyst-class wooden screw corvette launched in 1873 and sold in 1888.
- HMS Encounter was a Challenger-class protected cruiser launched in 1902. She was transferred to the Royal Australian Navy in 1919, renamed HMAS Penguin in 1923 while serving as a depot ship, and was scuttled in 1932.
- HMS Encounter (H10) was an E-class destroyer launched in 1934 and sunk in 1942.
