= HMS Opal (1875) =

British Emerald-class corvette

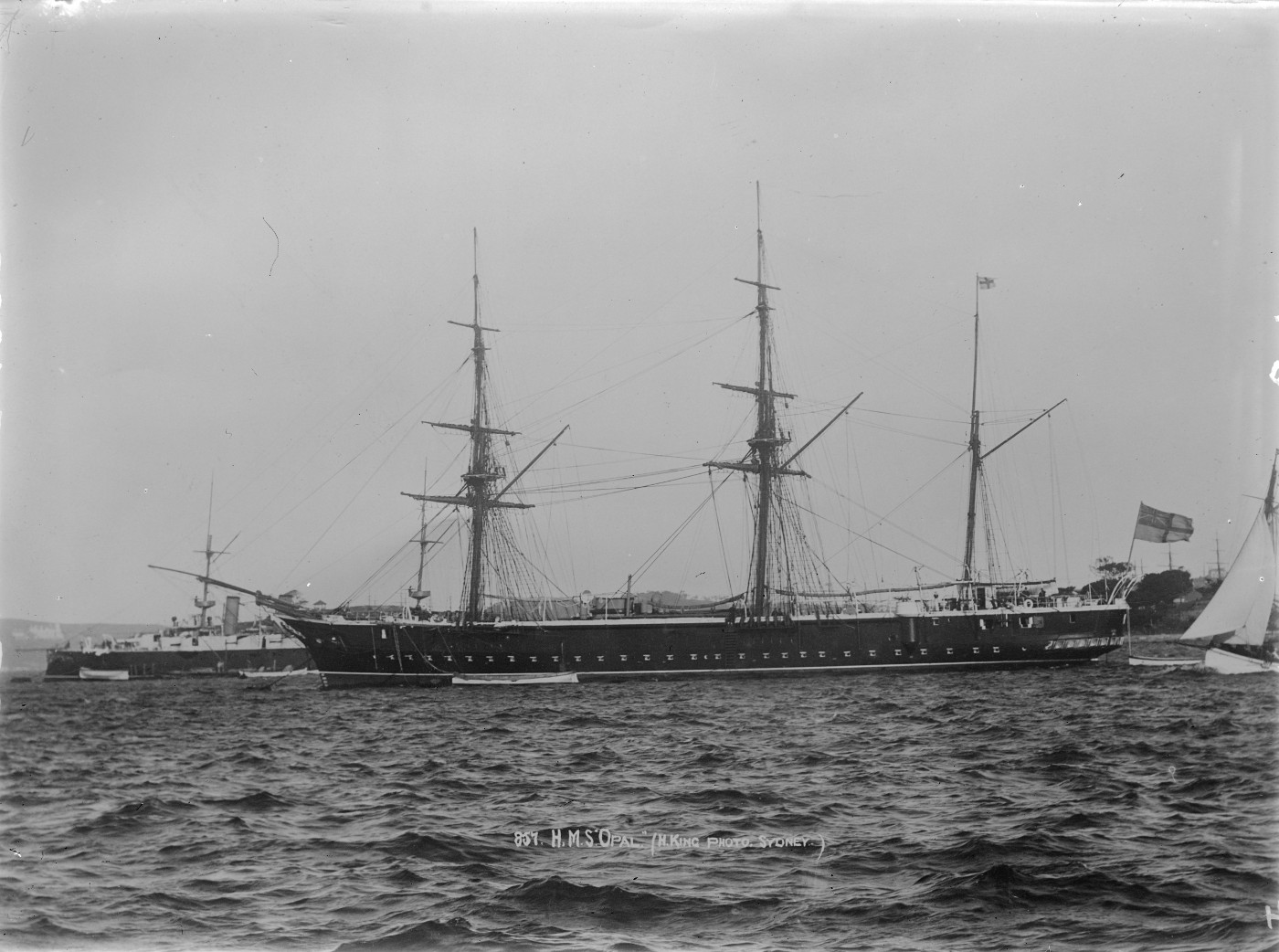
- Opal in Sydney

History

United Kingdom
- Name: HMS Opal
- Builder: William Doxford & Sons Ltd, Sunderland
- Laid down: 13 October 1873
- Launched: 9 March 1875
- Fate: Sold for breaking at Sheerness, August 1892

General characteristics
- Class & type: Emerald-class corvette
- Displacement: 2,120 tons
- Tons burthen: 1,864 bm
- Length: 220 ft (67 m) pp
- Beam: 40 ft (12 m)
- Draught: 16 ft 6 in (5.03 m) forwards; 18 ft (5.5 m) aft
- Depth of hold: 21 ft 6 in (6.55 m)
- Installed power: 2,187 ihp (1,631 kW); 350 nhp
- Propulsion: 2-cylinder horizontal compound expansion steam engine; 6 × cylindrical boilers; Single hoisting screw
- Sail plan: Full-rigged ship (barque from the 1880s)
- Complement: 232
- Armament: As built: 12 × 64-pounder 71-cwt rifled muzzle-loading (RML) guns; 2 × 64-pounder 64-cwt RML guns; From 1880: 10 × 64-pounder 71-cwt RML guns; 2 × 64-pounder 64-cwt RML guns

HMS Opal was an Emerald-class corvette of the Royal Navy, laid down as Magicienne by William Doxford & Sons Ltd, Sunderland and launched on 9 March 1875.

She was completed with an armament of 14 muzzle-loading 64-pounder rifled guns (2 as bow and stern chasers mounted on centre-line swivelling slides, and 12 on broadside slide mountings) and initially commenced service on the Pacific Station, and while on passage in 1876 hit a rock in the Strait of Magellan. She was damaged and repairs were undertaken at Esquimalt. She returned to England in 1880 for refit, in which her broadside armament was reduced by 2 guns and she was re-rigged as a barque.

She sailed for service on the Cape of Good Hope and West Africa Station in 1883. En route she arrived at Limbe, Cameroon on 19 July 1884, she was carrying the British Consul for the Bights of Benin and Biafra, Edward Hyde Hewett on his mission to claim the Victoria area (the Cameroon) for Britain. He arrived and planted his flag too late, as Gustav Nachtigal had already raised the German flag at Douala a few days earlier on 14 July 1884.

She then commenced service on the Australia Station in 1885. She returned to England in 1890 and was placed into reserve. She was sold for breaking up at Sheerness in August 1892.
