= Philip Nelson-Ward =

Royal Navy Admiral and courtier (1866–1937)

Admiral Philip Nelson-Ward CVO

Gentleman Usher to HM The King
- In office 1919–1936

Director of Navigation
- In office September 1913 – June 1916

Assistant Hydrographer of the Navy
- In office December 1912 – September 1913

Personal details
- Born: 1866
- Died: 27 June 1937 (aged 70–71)
- Relations: Horatia Nelson (grandmother); Lord Nelson (great grandfather)

Military service
- Branch/service: Royal Navy

Admiral Philip Nelson-Ward CVO (1866 – 27 June 1937) was a British Royal Navy officer and courtier.

== Naval service ==
Nelson-Ward was the son of a clergyman who was a grandson of Lord Nelson through his daughter Horatia. He entered the Royal Navy at the age of thirteen. In 1882, while a midshipman in the Bacchante-class corvette HMS Euryalus, he saw active service in Egypt. In 1886, he was commissioned sub-lieutenant. In April 1887, he joined the Emerald-class corvette HMS Tourmaline and, in October 1887, HMS Comus. In April 1889, he was promoted lieutenant and specialised in navigation, remaining a navigating officer throughout his career. In April 1889, he rejoined HMS Tourmaline, in February 1890, he joined HMS Sphinx, in November 1893, the protected cruiser HMS Thames, in January 1894 the protected cruiser HMS Aeolus, and, in July 1897, the battleship HMS Barfleur.

He served in the Barfleur during the Boxer Rebellion, after which he was promoted commander in June 1900. In February 1901, he was appointed navigating officer of the liner HMS Ophir, which was commissioned by the Royal Navy for the tour of the British Empire conducted by the Duke and Duchess of Cornwall and York. After the tour had ended, he was, in March 1902, appointed navigating officer of the battleship HMS Bulwark, which was to become flagship of the Mediterranean Fleet two months later. In February 1904, he joined the battleship HMS Albion, flagship of the China Station.

In January 1905, he was promoted captain. He commanded the cruiser HMS Indefatigable in the West Indies from 1906 to 1908, the Admiralty yacht HMS Enchantress from 1908 to 1911, and the battleship HMS Formidable with the Atlantic Fleet from April 1911 to 1912. In December 1912, he was appointed Assistant Hydrographer of the Navy. In September 1913, he was appointed to the new post of Director of Navigation, a post he held until his retirement in June 1916, when he was promoted rear-admiral.

In 1917, he was recalled to service in the organisation of the North Atlantic convoys, where he remained until the end of the First World War. In 1918, he became manager of the Lord Roberts Memorial London Workshops, holding the post until 1921. In 1919, he was also appointed Gentleman Usher to the King, holding the post until the death of George V in 1936. He also devoted considerable time to the welfare of Merchant Navy personnel, and was president of the Officers' (Merchant Navy) Federation, which he was instrumental in setting up, from 1928.

Nelson-Ward was appointed Member of the Royal Victorian Order (MVO) in December 1901 for his services in HMS Ophir, and Commander of the Royal Victorian Order (CVO) in the 1936 Birthday Honours. He was promoted vice-admiral on the retired list in July 1920 and admiral in May 1925.

== Family ==
He was married to the Honourable Dorothy Caulfeild, daughter of Viscount Charlemont. She was killed with her sister Rachel during an air raid on Bath on 27 April 1942.

== Arms ==
Coat of arms of Philip Nelson-Ward

Notes
Confirmed on 8th January 1936.
Crest
1st On a wreath of the colours a wolf's head erased Or gorged with a collar Sable thereon three bezants and charged on the neck with a ---- also Sable (Ward).
2nd On a wreath of the colours upon waves of the sea the stern of a Man-of-War Proper thereon inscribed the word "VICTORY" in letters Gules (Nelson).
Escutcheon
Quarterly 1st & 4th Azure a cross flory between four lions passant guardant Or (Ward) 2nd & 3rd Or a cross flory Sable a chief Gules thereon a fess engrailed of the field charged with three bombs fired Proper (Nelson).
Motto
Sub Cruce Salus
