= SS Dunraven =

British cargo vessel wrecked in the Gulf of Suez

Coordinates: 27°42′12″N 34°07′18″E

History

United Kingdom
- Builder: C. Mitchell and C. Iron Ship Builders
- Launched: 14 December 1872
- Homeport: Newcastle upon Tyne, England
- Fate: Sank 22 April 1876

General characteristics
- Tonnage: 1,600 GRT
- Length: 81.6 m (267 ft 9 in)
- Beam: 9.8 m (32 ft 2 in)
- Installed power: Two-cylinder steam engine
- Propulsion: Mixed steam and sail
- Speed: 8 knots

SS Dunraven was built in Newcastle upon Tyne at the C. Mitchell and C. Iron Ship Builders and was launched on 14 December 1872. The ship was owned by a Mr W. Milburn. Powered by both sail and steam, she was planned for the route from Britain to Bombay.

Three years later, in January 1876, she set sail from Liverpool loaded with steel and timber bound for Bombay. There the cargo was sold and she was reloaded with spices, cotton and muslin for the return journey. It was generally an uneventful journey and she reached the Red Sea approaches to the Suez Canal on 25 April. Thinking they were further up the Gulf of Suez than they actually were, Captain Care and the 25-man crew sailed the ship straight into a reef. The ship stuck fast south of Beacon Rock at the southern end of the furthest reaches of what is now the Ras Muhammad National Park on the outside of Sha'ab Mahmoud. The crew worked frantically to dislodge her, and 14 hours after striking the rock she slid off. This motion upset her balance and she capsized.

She sank quickly in 25 metres (82 ft) of water, leaving the crew to be rescued from the life boats by local fishermen. After the incident the British Board of Trade held an enquiry and found Captain Care to have been at fault. The board declared him negligent and revoked his captain's license, the Master's Certificate, for a year.

== Dive site ==
The Dunraven wreck was known to local fishermen for generations, as the shallow depth would cause their nets to snag, but it was only rediscovered for the world at large in 1977, either by a German oil company employee or by several local scuba divers based at Sharm el Sheikh, Egypt, including Howard Rosenstein, owner and manager of the Red Sea Divers center in 1977. The ship was dived on soon afterwards, and many wide theories appeared — for example, that it was a World War I ship that operated on behalf of Lawrence of Arabia. Then a piece of porcelain was found with the name SS Dunraven. Legends still surround the wreck; there are stories of the wreck being caused by an argument between the ship′s drunk captain and his promiscuous wife.

Since its rediscovery the wreck has become a popular dive site because of its shallow depth. The wreck has largely broken up; it lies upside down on the reef, but there are three large holes in the hull which allow divers to penetrate the wreck and examine the two large boilers and a host of fallen metalwork. In part owing to the shallow depth, an abundance of reef fish can be found: glassfish, groupers, jackfish, scorpionfish, and crocodilefish can all be seen around the ruptures in the hull.

== See also ==
List of shipwrecks in 1876
