= List of shipwrecks in 1876 =

The list of shipwrecks in 1876 includes ships sunk, foundered, grounded, or otherwise lost during 1876.

table of contents
1876
Jan	Feb	Mar	Apr
May	Jun	Jul	Aug
Sep	Oct	Nov	Dec
Unknown date

== Unknown date ==
List of shipwrecks: Unknown date 1876
Ship	State	Description
Amanda	United Kingdom	The barque foundered in the Atlantic Ocean off Cape Cormorant, Brazil, according to a message in a bottle that washed up at Ilfracombe, Devon in June.
A. M. C. Smith	Flag unknown	The schooner was lost in the vicinity of "Squan Beach," a term used at the time for the coast of New Jersey near Manasquan and sometimes for the 7-mile (11 km) stretch of coast between Manasquan Inlet and Cranberry Inlet or for the entire coast of New Jersey between Sea Girt and Barnegat Inlet.
Ariantas	United Kingdom	The brig was presumed to have been lost with all eight crew. She was on a voyage from South Shields, County Durham to Woolwich, Kent.
Beulah	United Kingdom	The ship was driven ashore on Tahiti. She was on a voyage from Enderbury Island to a European port. She was a total loss.
Clara Bell	United States	The 196-ton whaler, a barque was abandoned in the ice in the Beaufort Sea a few miles south of Cape Smith, Department of Alaska (70°40′N 151°30′W) during the whaling season of 1876. She was found at anchor and clear of ice in 1877, partially stripped by Alaska Natives. Passing ships further stripped her. Around 20 September 1877 she broke loose and drifted off to the northeast. She was last seen off Harrison Bay before she disappeared in the Beaufort Sea.
Delaware	United States	The steamship sank at New York. Sold for scrap in February 1877.
D. E. Woodbury	United States	The fishing schooner was reportedly last seen in December 1876 or January 1877 off Seal Island. Lost with all ten crewmen.
HMS Diamond	Royal Navy	The Amethyst-class corvette was driven ashore on the coast of Zanzibar. She was refloated.
Eleanor	United Kingdom	The barque was wrecked. Her crew were rescued by a Norwegian vessel. She was on a voyage from Liverpool, Lancashire to Arkhangelsk, Russia.
Eliza Jane	Unknown	The schooner was lost in the vicinity of "Squan Beach," a term used at the time for the coast of New Jersey near Manasquan and sometimes for the 7-mile (11 km) stretch of coast between Manasquan Inlet and Cranberry Inlet or for the entire coast of New Jersey between Sea Girt and Barnegat Inlet.
Fernande	France	The schooner was wrecked on Île Amsterdam with the loss of all but her captain. She was on a voyage from Réunion to Île Amsterdam.
HMS Fly	Royal Navy	The Albacore-class gunboat ran aground at Amoy, China. She was taken in to Shanghai, China, where she was placed under repair on 14 September.
Gnome	United Kingdom	The steamship collided with the barque San Luis (Flag unknown) and sank off Cuxhaven, Germany.
Golden City	United Kingdom	The clipper was wrecked off the French coast.
Heath Park	United Kingdom	The ship departed from New York for a British port after 24 October. She subsequently foundered with some loss of life.
Helen	United States	The whaler, a barque, was wrecked in the Cumberland Gulf. Her crew survived.
James L. Shute	United States	The fishing schooner was lost on the Grand Banks of Newfoundland in April or May with the loss of all fourteen crew.
Janet Middleton	United States	The fishing schooner was lost on the Grand Banks of Newfoundland in April or May with the loss of all eleven crew.
HMS Lapwing	Royal Navy	The Plover-class gunvessel was driven ashore on the coast of China and was severely damaged. She was later refloated.
Lillian Cameron	Unknown	The brigantine was lost in the vicinity of "Squam Beach," a term used at the time for the coast of New Jersey near Manasquan and sometimes for the 7-mile (11 km) stretch of coast between Manasquan Inlet and Cranberry Inlet or for the entire coast of New Jersey between Sea Girt and Barnegat Inlet.
Magdalina	Unknown	The brig was lost at Cranberry Inlet on the coast of New Jersey.
Monarch	United Kingdom	The ship capsized in the Indian Ocean 130 nautical miles (240 km) south of Bombay, India with the loss of all 30 crew. She was on a voyage from Rangoon, Burma to Bombay.
Northern Chief	(United Kingdom of Great Britain and Ireland) Jersey	The schooner departed from Cheticamp for Arichat, Nova Scotia, Canada in late September or early October. No further trace, presumed foundered with the loss of all hands.
Padang	United Kingdom	The ship foundered at sea. Her crew were rescued. She was on a voyage from Iquique, Peru to Falmouth, Cornwall.
Reine des Anges	France	The fishing vessel was presumed to have sunk off the coast of Iceland with the loss of all hands.
San Rafael	Flag unknown	The ship was lost in the South Seas.
Sara Lefevre	France	The fishing vessel was presumed to have sunk off the coast of Iceland with the loss of all hands.
Timour	United Kingdom	The ship capsized in the Bay of Bengal. She was on a voyage from Dundee, Forfarshire to Calcutta, India.
Un'yō	Imperial Japanese Navy	The gunboat ran aground at Atawa-mura, on the Kii Peninsula and was wrecked with the loss of 23 of her crew.
