= HMS Diamond (1874) =

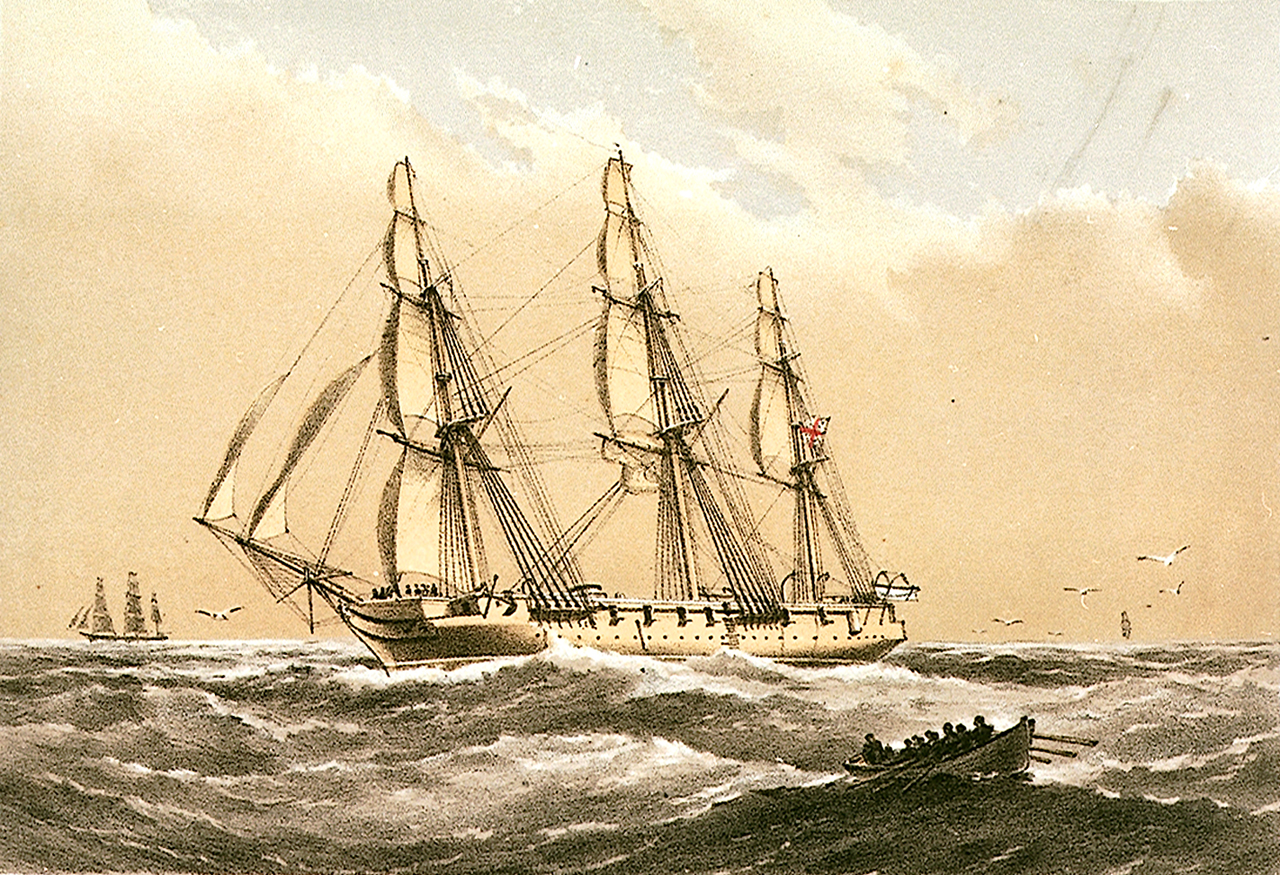
- HMS Diamond

History

United Kingdom
- Name: HMS Diamond
- Namesake: Diamond
- Builder: Sheerness Dockyard
- Cost: £76,796
- Laid down: 1873
- Launched: 26 September 1874
- Completed: July 1875
- Fate: Sold for scrap, August 1889

General characteristics (as built)
- Class & type: Amethyst-class wooden screw corvette
- Displacement: 1,934 long tons (1,965 t)
- Tons burthen: 1,405 bm
- Length: 220 ft (67.1 m) (p/p)
- Beam: 37 ft (11.3 m)
- Draught: 18 ft (5.5 m)
- Installed power: 2,140 ihp (1,600 kW)
- Propulsion: 1 shaft; 1 × 2-cylinder compound expansion steam engine; 6 cylindrical boilers
- Sail plan: Ship rig
- Speed: 12 knots (22 km/h; 14 mph)
- Range: approximately 2,500 nmi (4,600 km; 2,900 mi) at 10 knots (19 km/h; 12 mph)
- Complement: 225
- Armament: 12 × 64-pounder 71 cwt rifled muzzle-loading (RML) guns; 2 × 64-pounder 64 cwt RML guns

HMS Diamond was an Amethyst-class corvette built for the Royal Navy and remained in service 1874–89.

== History ==
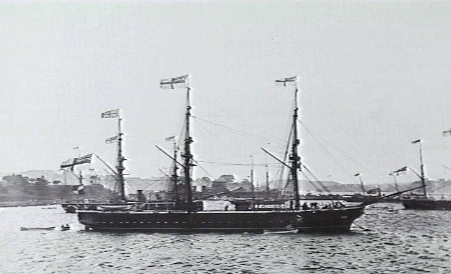
HMS Diamond in Sydney in 1877

Diamond was built at Sheerness Dockyard and launched on 26 September 1874.

In 1875 she commissioned service for the East Indies Station, later being transferred to the China Station. In 1876, she was driven ashore on the coast of Zanzibar. She was refloated. She returned to England in 1879 and was refitted and rearmed. After refit she commissioned service on the Australia Station in October 1881. She left the Australia Station in August 1888 and returned to England. She returned to Chatham and was paid off in 1889. She was sold in August 1889.

== Bibliography ==
- Ballard, G. A. (1937). "British Corvettes of 1875: The Last Wooden class". Mariner's Mirror. 23 (October). Cambridge, UK: Society for Nautical Research: 435–45.
- Bastock, John (1988), Ships on the Australia Station, Child & Associates Publishing Pty Ltd; Frenchs Forest, Australia. ISBN 0-86777-348-0
- Colledge, J. J.; Warlow, Ben (2006) [1969]. Ships of the Royal Navy: The Complete Record of All Fighting Ships of the Royal Navy from the 15th Century to the Present (3rd Rev ed.). London: Chatham Publishing. ISBN 978-1-86176-281-8. OCLC 67375475.
- Gardiner, Robert, ed. (1979). Conway's All the World's Fighting Ships 1860-1905. London: Conway Maritime Press. ISBN 0-8317-0302-4.
- Lyon, David & Winfield, Rif (2004). The Sail and Steam Navy List: All the Ships of the Royal Navy 1815–1889. Chatham Publishing. ISBN 978-1-86176-032-6. OCLC 52620555.
