= Volage-class corvette =

Royal Navy screw corvettes

- Circa 1892 photograph of HMS Volage, lead ship of the class

Class overview
- Name: Volage class
- Builders: Thames Ironworks and Shipbuilding Company, Blackwall, London
- Operators: Royal Navy
- Preceded by: Briton class
- Succeeded by: Amethyst class
- Built: 1867–1871
- Completed: 2
- Scrapped: 2

General characteristics (as built)
- Type: Iron screw corvette
- Displacement: 3,078 long tons (3,127 t)
- Tons burthen: 2,322 bm
- Length: 270 ft (82.3 m) (p/p)
- Beam: 42 ft 1 in (12.8 m)
- Draught: 21 ft 5 in (6.5 m)
- Installed power: 4,130 ihp (3,080 kW)
- Propulsion: 1 × shaft; 1 × 2-cylinder steam engine; 5 × rectangular boilers
- Sail plan: Ship rig
- Speed: 15 knots (28 km/h; 17 mph)
- Range: 2,000 nmi (3,700 km; 2,300 mi) at 10 knots (19 km/h; 12 mph)
- Complement: 340
- Armament: 6 × 7-inch rifled muzzle-loading guns; 4 × 6.3-inch 64-pounder rifled muzzle-loading guns

The Volage class was a group of two screw corvettes built for the Royal Navy in the late 1860s. Both ships spent the bulk of their active service abroad. Volage spent most of her first commission assigned to the Detached or Flying Squadron circumnavigating the world and then carried a party of astronomers to the Kerguelen Islands to observe the Transit of Venus in 1874. The ship was then assigned as the senior officer's ship in South American waters until she was transferred to the Training Squadron during the 1880s.

Active served as the commodore's ship on the Cape of Good Hope and West Africa Station and her crew served ashore in both the Third Anglo-Ashanti and Zulu Wars. She was assigned to the Training Squadron in 1885 after a period in reserve. The sisters were paid off in 1898–99 and sold for scrap in 1904 and 1906, respectively.

== Design and description ==
Sir Edward Reed, the Director of Naval Construction, was tasked to provide a combination of seaworthiness and speed for these ships. He gave the ships a high length-to-beam ratio to increase their speed, but this made the design less manoeuvrable. To offset this, the ends of the ships were narrowed to allow the rudder as much authority as possible even though this reduced buoyancy at the ends of the ship and caused the weights to be concentrated in the middle of the ship. The compromise proved to be successful and the design did not have a large turning circle. Admiral G. A. Ballard considered them to be "a definite step forward in the shipbuilder's art." Ballard considered their only real defect to be unsteadiness as gun platforms as their metacentric height was fairly high, which caused them to roll excessively, and they pitched quite a bit in a head sea due to the lack of buoyancy in the narrow bow. Bilge keels were later installed during one of their refits to curb their rolling motion.

The Volage-class ships were 270 feet (82.3 m) long between perpendiculars and had a beam of 42 feet 1 inch (12.8 m). Forward, the ships had a draught of 16 feet 5 inches (5.0 m), but aft they drew 21 ft 5 in (6.5 m). They displaced 3,078 long tons (3,127 t) and had a burthen of 2,322 tons. Their iron hull was covered by a 3-inch (76 mm) layer of oak that was sheathed with copper from the waterline down to prevent biofouling. Watertight transverse bulkheads subdivided the hull. Their crew consisted of 340 officers and ratings.

The ships had one 2-cylinder steam engine driving a single 19-foot (5.8 m) propeller. Five rectangular boilers provided steam to the engine at a working pressure of 30 psi (207 kPa; 2 kgf/cm^{2}). The engine produced a total of 4,130–4,530 indicated horsepower (3,080–3,380 kW) which gave them a maximum speed of about 15 knots (28 km/h; 17 mph). The ships carried 410–420 long tons (420–430 t) of coal, enough to steam 1,850–2,000 nautical miles (3,430–3,700 km; 2,130–2,300 mi) at 10 knots (19 km/h; 12 mph).

The class was ship rigged and had a sail area of 16,593 square feet (1,542 m^{2}). The lower masts were made of iron, but the other masts were wood. Their best speed under sail alone was 12.5 to 13 knots (23.2 to 24.1 km/h; 14.4 to 15.0 mph). Their funnel was semi-retractable to reduce wind resistance and the propeller could be hoisted up into the stern of the ship to reduce drag while under sail.

The ships were initially armed with a mix of 7-inch and 64-pounder 64 cwt (Note: "cwt" is the abbreviation for hundredweight, 64 cwt referring to the weight of the gun.) rifled muzzle-loading guns. The six 7-inch (178 mm) guns and two of the four 64-pounders were mounted on the broadside while the other two were mounted on the forecastle and poop deck as chase guns. The 16-calibre 7-inch gun weighed 6.5 long tons (6.6 t) and fired a 112-pound (50.8 kg) shell. It was credited with the nominal ability to penetrate 7.7-inch (196 mm) armour. In 1879–80, ten BL 6-inch 80-pounder breech-loading guns replaced all the broadside weapons. (Note: There is some confusion as to the exact model, the Mk I or Mk II, of 6-inch gun carried by these ships. Ballard, Winfield, and Gardiner all say Mk I firing an 80-pound (36 kg) shell. Campbell, however, specifically lists these ships as carrying Mk IIs that could fire 100-pound (45 kg) shells. He even describes an incident where one of the guns aboard Active blew up in November 1884. Furthermore, Campbell says that only 19 Mk I guns were built and that they were mounted on two Comus-class corvettes and then in HMS Rover. 143 Mk II guns were built and armed the Bacchante-class and Comus-class ships, among others. It seems odd that the Mk I and II weighed nearly the same amount, but the Mk II fired a much heavier shell, according to Campbell. Perhaps the simplest way to reconcile these problems is that Campbell made a typo when giving the shell weight fired by the Mk II and that both marks fired the same 80-pound shell. The relevant gunnery handbooks need to be consulted to see if Campbell made a mistake or not.) Two carriages for 14-inch (356 mm) torpedoes were also added.

== Ships ==
| Ship | Builder | Laid down | Launched | Completed | Fate | Cost |
|---|---|---|---|---|---|---|
| HMS Volage | Thames Ironworks, Blackwall, London | September 1867 | 27 February 1869 | March 1870 | Sold for scrap, 17 May 1904 | £132,817 |
| HMS Active | Thames Ironworks, Blackwall, London | 1867 | 13 March 1869 | March 1871 | Sold for scrap 10 July 1906 | £126,156 |

Volage was the first ship to be commissioned and was initially assigned to the Channel Fleet under the command of Captain Sir Michael Culme-Seymour, Bt. However, by the end of 1870, she was transferred to the Flying Squadron which circumnavigated the world. The ship returned to England at the end of 1872 and was given a lengthy refit. During this time, Volage was rearmed with eighteen 64-pdr 64 cwt guns. She recommissioned in 1874 to ferry an expedition to the Kerguelen Islands to observe the transit of Venus. The following year, the ship was assigned as the senior officer's ship for the South American side of the South Atlantic. Volage was ordered home in 1879 where she was refitted, rearmed and her boilers were replaced. The ship was assigned to the Training Squadron in the 1880s where she remained until it was disbanded in 1899. Volage was then paid off and sold for scrap in 1904.

Unlike her sister ship, Active was placed in reserve after completion until 1873 when she was commissioned to serve as the flagship of the Commander-in-Chief, Cape of Good Hope and West Coast of Africa Station, Commodore William Hewett. The ship participated in naval operations during the Third Anglo-Ashanti War of 1874 and some of her crew were landed to reinforce the forces ashore. Commodore Francis Sullivan replaced Hewett in 1876 and some of her officers and men participated in the Anglo-Zulu War of 1878–79 as part of the Naval Brigade. Sullivan remained in command until 1879 when the ship returned home to refit and rearm. Active was placed in reserve after the completion of her refit until she was selected in 1885 to be the commodore's flagship in the newly formed Training Squadron. The ship was paid off from this assignment in 1898 and sold for scrap in 1906.

== Bibliography ==
- Ballard, G. A. (1937). "British Corvettes of 1875: The Volage, Active and Rover". Mariner's Mirror. 23 (January). Cambridge, UK: Society for Nautical Research: 53–67.
- Campbell, N.J.M. (1983). "British Naval Guns 1880–1945, No. 10". In John Roberts (ed.). Warship. Vol. VII. Annapolis, Maryland: Naval Institute Press. pp. 170–72. ISBN 0-87021-982-0.
- Chesneau, Roger; Kolesnik, Eugene M., eds. (1979). Conway's All the World's Fighting Ships 1860–1905. Greenwich, UK: Conway Maritime Press. ISBN 0-8317-0302-4.
- Lyon, David & Winfield, Rif (2004). The Sail and Steam Navy List: All the Ships of the Royal Navy 1815–1889. Chatham Publishing. ISBN 978-1-86176-032-6. OCLC 52620555.
