= HMS Rover (1874) =

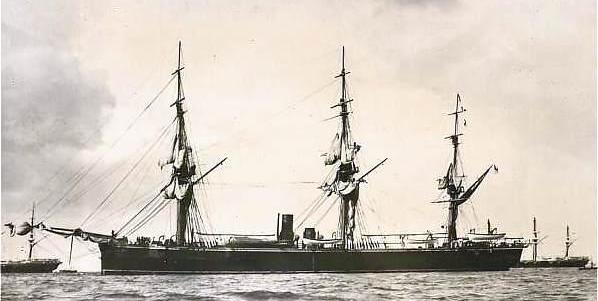
- HMS Rover

Class overview
- Name: HMS Rover
- Operators: Royal Navy
- Preceded by: Amethyst class
- Succeeded by: Emerald class
- Built: 1872–1874
- In commission: 1874–89
- Completed: 1
- Scrapped: 1

History

United Kingdom
- Builder: Thames Ironworks and Shipbuilding Company, Leamouth, London
- Cost: £169,739
- Laid down: 1872
- Launched: 12 August 1874
- Completed: 21 September 1875
- Fate: Sold for scrap, 1893

General characteristics (as built)
- Type: Iron screw corvette
- Displacement: 3,462 long tons (3,518 t)
- Length: 208 ft (63.4 m) pp
- Beam: 43 ft 6 in (13.3 m)
- Draught: 17 ft 6 in (5.33 m) (forward); 22 ft 7 in (6.88 m) (aft)
- Depth of hold: 23 ft (7.01 m)
- Installed power: 4,964 ihp (3,702 kW)
- Propulsion: Single (hoisting) screw; 3-cylinder horizontal compound-expansion steam engine; 10 cylindrical boilers
- Sail plan: Ship rig
- Speed: 14.5 knots (26.9 km/h; 16.7 mph); Under sail 11 knots (20 km/h; 13 mph)
- Range: 1,840 nmi (3,410 km; 2,120 mi) at 10 knots (19 km/h; 12 mph)
- Complement: 315
- Armament: 2 × 7-inch rifled muzzle-loading guns; 16 × 6.3-inch 64-pounder rifled muzzle-loading guns

HMS Rover was an 18-gun iron screw corvette built for the Royal Navy in the 1870s, the sole ship of her class. The ship was initially assigned to the North America and West Indies Station until she returned home in 1879. She was transferred to the Training Squadron when it formed in 1885. Rover was not really suitable for such a role and she was placed in reserve four years later and then sold for scrap in 1893.

== Design and construction ==
Rover was designed in 1872 by Edward Reed, the Chief Constructor of the Navy, as an improved version of the Volage-class corvettes. She displaced 3,462 long tons (3,518 t) tons, nearly 400 long tons (410 t) larger than the older ships. The ship was 280 feet (85.3 m) long between perpendiculars and had a beam of 43 feet 6 inches (13.3 m). Forward the ship had a draught of 17 feet 6 inches (5.3 m), but aft she drew 22 ft 7 in (6.9 m). Her iron hull was covered by a 3-inch (76 mm) layer of oak that was sheathed with zinc from the waterline down to prevent biofouling. Watertight transverse bulkheads subdivided the hull. Her crew consisted of 315 officers and ratings.

The ship had one three-cylinder horizontal compound-expansion steam engine made by Ravenhill, Eastons & Co., driving a single 21-foot (6.4 m) propeller. Ten cylindrical boilers provided steam to the engine at a working pressure of 70 psi (483 kPa; 5 kgf/cm^{2}). The engine produced a total of 4,964 indicated horsepower (3,702 kW) which gave Rover a maximum speed of 14.5 knots (26.9 km/h; 16.7 mph). The ship carried 420 long tons (430 t) of coal, enough to steam 1,840 nautical miles (3,410 km; 2,120 mi) at 10 knots (19 km/h; 12 mph). (Note: Ballard credits the compound engine as being much more economical in fuel consumption than the older designs used in the Volage-class ships, but the range figure quoted by Lyon and Winfield is almost identical as that of the older ships for the same amount of coal.)

Rover was ship rigged and had a sail area of 17,863 square feet (1,660 m^{2}). The ship was an indifferent sailor and her best speed under sail alone was only 11 knots (20 km/h; 13 mph). Ballard believes that one cause of her poor performance under sail was due to the drag of her uneven fore-and-aft trim. Her propeller could be hoisted up into the stern of the ship to reduce drag while under sail.

The ship was initially armed with a mix of 7-inch and 64-pounder 64 cwt (Note: "cwt" is the abbreviation for hundredweight, 64 cwt referring to the weight of the gun.) rifled muzzle-loading guns. All sixteen 64-pounders were mounted on the broadside while the two 7-inch (178 mm) guns were mounted underneath the forecastle and poop deck as chase guns. In 1880, the ship was rearmed with 14 BL 6-inch 80-pounder breech-loading guns. One gun each was mounted at the bow and stern as chase guns while the remainder were broadside guns. Two carriages for 14-inch (356 mm) torpedoes were added as well.

Rover was laid down at the yards of the Thames Ironworks and Shipbuilding Company at Leamouth, London in 1872. She was launched on 12 August 1874 and completed on 21 September 1875 at a total cost of £169,739. Her hull cost £104,718 and her machinery £65,021.

== Career ==
The ship was initially assigned to the North America and West Indies Station, and was slightly damaged by grounding on one occasion. Rover returned home in 1879 to refit at Chatham Dockyard in 1879. She was placed into reserve after the completion of her refit until she was assigned to the Training Squadron upon its formation in 1885. Rover was less than ideal for this role because of her poor performance under sail alone and she was paid off in 1889 and sold for scrap in 1893. Among the men who had served aboard her was the Antarctic explorer Robert Falcon Scott, who spent nine months aboard Rover starting in late 1886.

== Bibliography ==
- Ballard, G. A. (1937). "British Corvettes of 1875: The Volage, Active and Rover". Mariner's Mirror. 23 (January). Cambridge, UK: Society for Nautical Research: 53–67. doi:10.1080/00253359.1937.10657219.
- Colledge, J. J.; Warlow, Ben (2006) [1969]. Ships of the Royal Navy: The Complete Record of All Fighting Ships of the Royal Navy from the 15th Century to the Present (3rd Rev ed.). London: Chatham Publishing. ISBN 978-1-86176-281-8. OCLC 67375475.
- Huxley, Elspeth Joscelin Grant (1990). Scott of the Antarctic. University of Nebraska Press. ISBN 0-8032-7248-0.
- Lyon, David & Winfield, Rif (2004). The Sail and Steam Navy List: All the Ships of the Royal Navy 1815–1889. Chatham Publishing. ISBN 978-1-86176-032-6. OCLC 52620555.
