= Composite construction =

Composite construction is a generic term to describe any building construction involving multiple dissimilar materials. Composite construction is often used in building aircraft, watercraft, and building construction. There are several reasons to use composite materials including increased strength, aesthetics, and environmental sustainability.

== Structural engineering ==
In structural engineering, composite construction exists when two different materials are bound together so strongly that they act together as a single unit from a structural point of view. When this occurs, it is called composite action. One common example involves steel beams supporting concrete floor slabs. If the beam is not connected firmly to the slab, then the slab transfers all of its weight to the beam and the slab contributes nothing to the load carrying capability of the beam. However, if the slab is connected positively to the beam with studs, then a portion of the slab can be assumed to act compositely with the beam. In effect, this composite creates a larger and stronger beam than would be provided by the steel beam alone. The structural engineer may calculate a transformed section as one step in analyzing the load carry capability of the composite beam.

== Ships ==
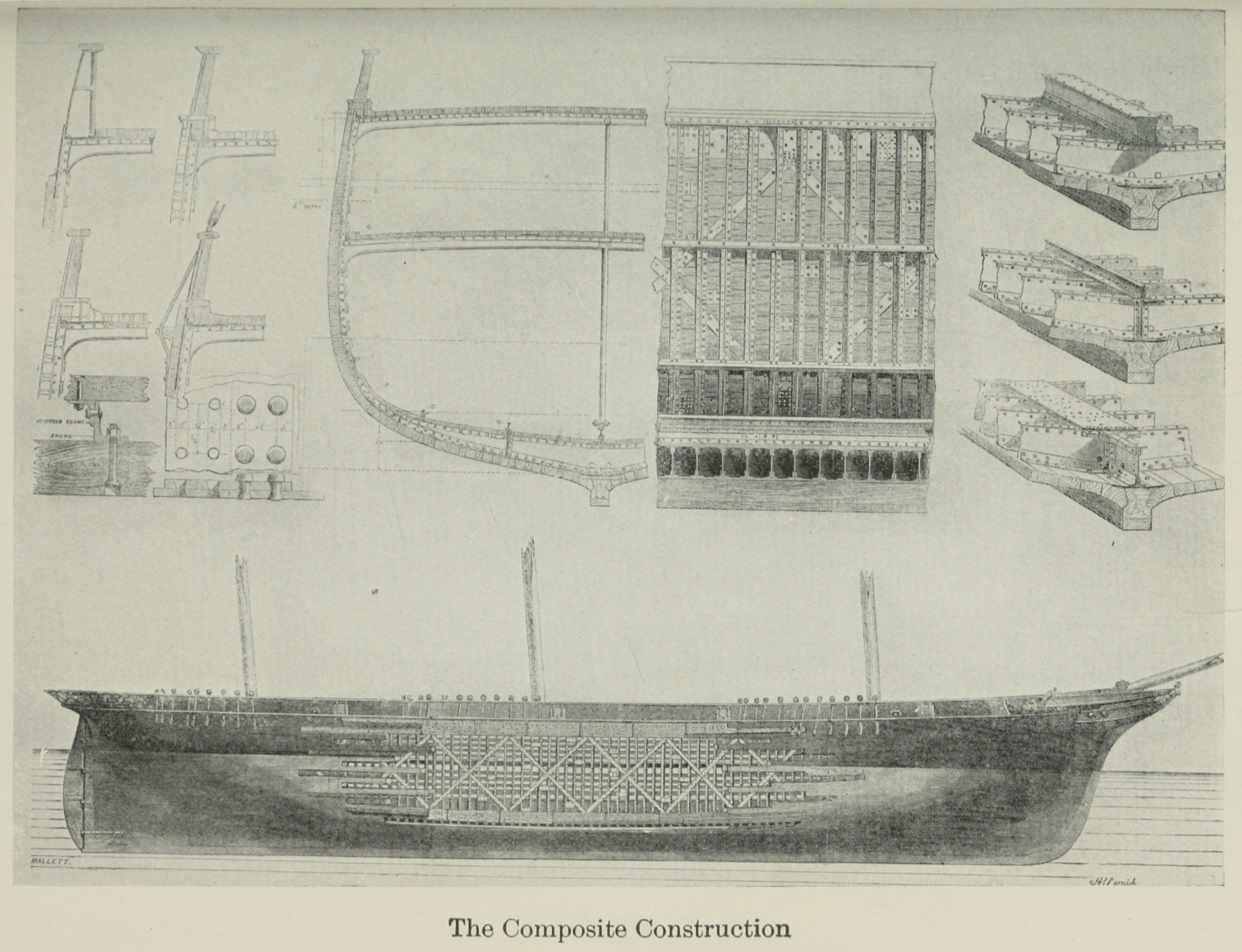
Contemporary drawings of composite construction

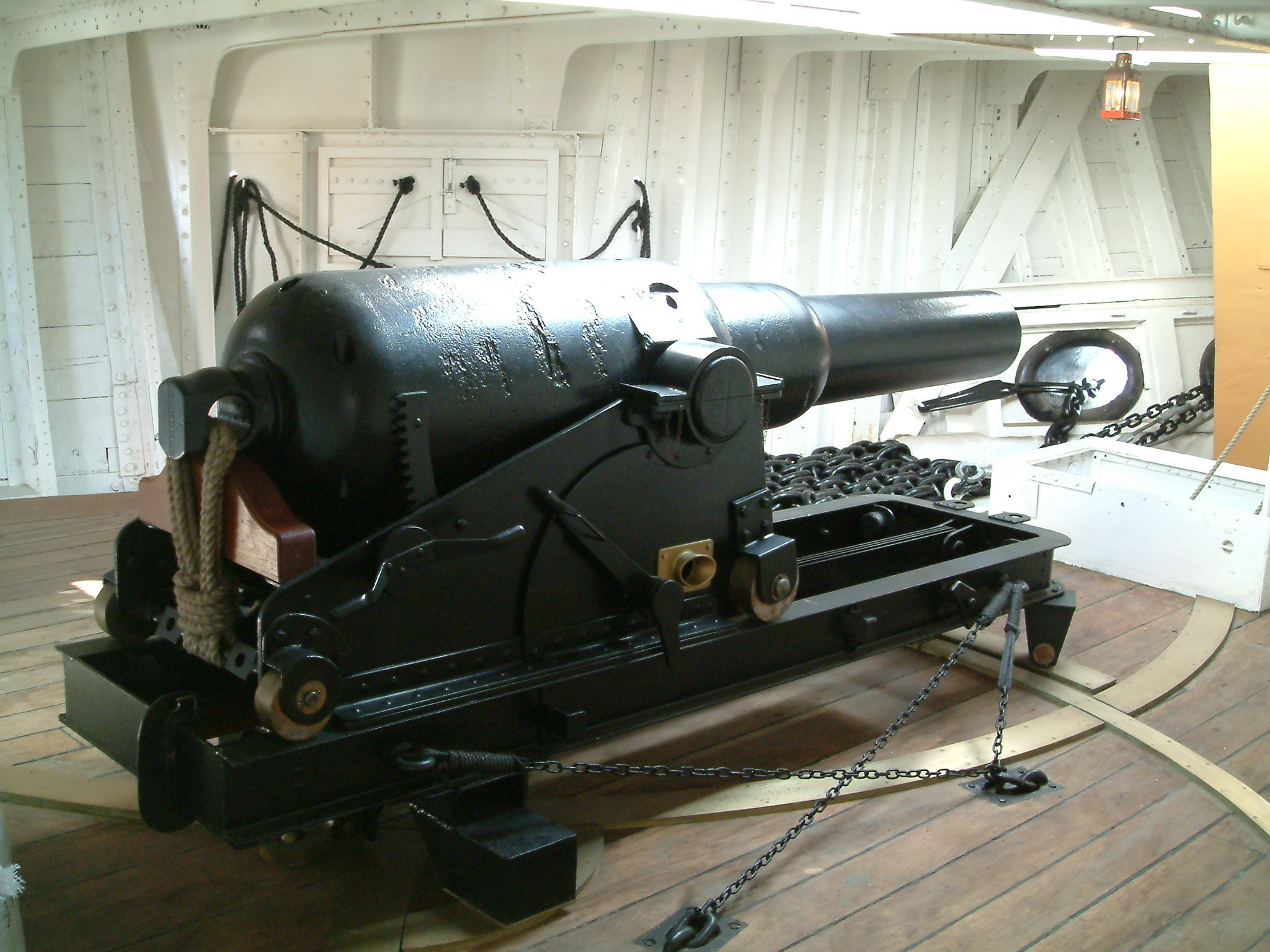
Internal view of HMS Gannet, with the iron frames and timber planking visible

In 19th-century shipbuilding, composite construction was the use of an iron hull framework which was covered in timber planking to provide the water-tight skin of the hull. If properly insulated fastenings were used on the timber, the underwater hull could be covered with copper sheathing without the problem of galvanic corrosion. Copper sheathing prevented fouling and teredo worm, but could not be used on iron hulls. The iron framework of composite ships was less bulky and lighter than timber, so allowing more cargo in a hull of the same external shape. The weight saving was particularly significant. The strength and stiffness allowed sailing vessels to be driven hard as the accumulated straining of the hull did not produce the leaks that would develop in the older wooden built ships.

Composite hulls were used for the majority of the clippers built from the mid-1860s. Early experiments with the system started with a patent issued in 1839, under which the steamer Assam was built. Other patents followed, with differing methods of electrically insulating the iron frames and fastenings from the copper sheathing.

Surviving examples are HMS Gannet (1878), a steam and sail-powered warship, and the clipper Cutty Sark.

== House building ==
A flitch beam is a simple form of composite construction sometimes used in North American light frame construction. This occurs when a steel plate is sandwiched between two wood joists and bolted together. A flitch beam can typically support heavier loads over a longer span than an all-wood beam of the same cross section.

== Deck construction ==
=== Composite wood decking ===
The traditional decking material is pressure-treated wood. The current material many contractors choose to use is composite decking. This material is typically made from wood–plastic composite or fiberglass reinforced plastic (FRP). Such materials do not warp, crack, or split and are as versatile as traditional pressure treated wood. Composite decking is made through several different processes, and there are a multitude of sizes, shapes, and strengths available. Depending on the type of composite selected the decking materials can be used for a number of other construction projects including fences and sheds.

=== Composite steel deck ===
In a composite steel deck, the dissimilar materials in question are steel and concrete. A composite steel deck combines the tensile strength of steel with the compressive strength of concrete to improve design efficiency and reduce the material necessary to cover a given area. Additionally, composite steel decks supported by composite steel joists can span greater distances between supporting elements and have reduced live load deflection in comparison to previous construction methods.

== Cement-polymer composites ==
Cement-polymer composites are being developed and tested as a replacement for traditional cement. The traditional cement used as stucco rapidly deteriorates. The deterioration causes the material to easily crack due to thermal processes becoming permeable to water and no longer structurally sound. The United States Environmental Protection Agency in conjunction with Materials and Electrochemical Research Corporation tested a cement-polymer composite material consisting of crumb rubber made from recycled rubber tires and cement. It was found that 20% crumb rubber can be added to the cement mixture without affecting the appearance of the cement. This new material was tested for strength and durability using American Society for Testing and Materials (ASTM International) standards.

== See also ==
- Composite material
- Construction
- Framing (construction)
- Reinforced concrete
- Structural analysis
