= Amethyst-class corvette =

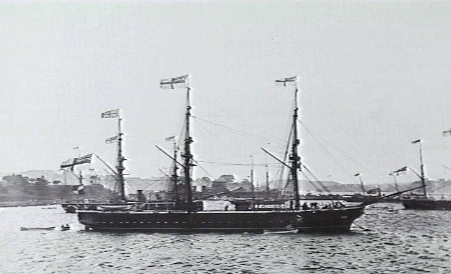
- HMS Diamond in Farm Cove, Sydney c. 1887

Class overview
- Name: Amethyst class
- Builders: Devonport Dockyard, Sheerness Dockyard
- Operators: Royal Navy
- Preceded by: Volage class
- Succeeded by: HMS Rover
- Built: 1871–75
- Completed: 5
- Scrapped: 5

General characteristics (as built)
- Type: Wooden screw corvette
- Displacement: 1,934 long tons (1,965 t)
- Tons burthen: 1,405 bm
- Length: 220 ft (67.1 m) (p/p)
- Beam: 37 ft (11.3 m)
- Draught: 18 ft (5.5 m)
- Installed power: 2,031–2,364 ihp (1,515–1,763 kW)
- Propulsion: 1 shaft; 1 × 2-cylinder compound expansion steam engine; 6 cylindrical boilers
- Sail plan: Ship rig
- Speed: 12–13 knots (22–24 km/h; 14–15 mph)
- Range: 2,060–2,500 nmi (3,820–4,630 km; 2,370–2,880 mi) at 10 knots (19 km/h; 12 mph)
- Complement: 225
- Armament: 14 × 64-pounder 71-cwt or 64-cwt rifled muzzle-loading (RML) guns

The Amethyst-class corvettes were a class of the last wooden warships to be built for the British Royal Navy; each was built at a Royal Dockyard. Three were ordered under the 1871–72 Programme and two under the 1872–73 Programme. Built in the early and middle 1870s, they mostly served overseas and were retired early as they were regarded as hopelessly obsolete by the late 1880s. The lead ship of the class, HMS Amethyst, served alongside HMS Shah in the action against the Peruvian warship Huáscar on 29th May 1877.

== Design ==
Unlike earlier wooden corvettes in the Navy, the Amethyst class corvettes had clipper bows (like the earlier Amazon Class sloops), while the last two had frigate sterns. All were initially ship-rigged (except for Encounter, which was barque-rigged), but after their first commission the Modeste, Diamond and Sapphire (but not Amethyst) were re-rigged as barques. They were completed with fourteen 64-pdr guns, of which twelve were truck-mounted on the broadsides and two were on rotating slides as bow and stern chasers. The guns were 64 cwt in the first three ships and 71 cwt in the last two.

== Ships ==
| Ship | Builder | Laid down | Launched | Completed | Fate | Cost |
|---|---|---|---|---|---|---|
| Encounter | Sheerness Dockyard | 19 June 1871 | 1 January 1873 | July 1873 | Sold for scrap October 1888 | £63,098 |
| Amethyst | Devonport Dockyard | 28 July 1871 | 19 April 1873 | July 1873 | Sold for scrap, November 1887 | N/A |
| Modeste | Devonport Dockyard | 27 November 1871 | 23 May 1873 | January 1874 | Sold for scrap, 8 January 1888 | N/A |
| Diamond | Sheerness Dockyard | 1873 | 26 August 1873 | July 1875 | Sold for scrap August 1889 | £76,796 |
| Sapphire | Devonport Dockyard | 17 June 1873 | 24 September 1874 | August 1875 | Sold for scrap, 24 September 1892 | £78,297 |

== Bibliography ==
- Ballard, G. A. (1937). "British Corvettes of 1875: The Last Wooden Class". Mariner's Mirror. 23 (October). Cambridge, UK: Society for Nautical Research: 435–45.
- Chesneau, Roger & Kolesnik, Eugene M., eds. (1979). Conway's All the World's Fighting Ships 1860–1905. Greenwich, UK: Conway Maritime Press. ISBN 0-8317-0302-4.
- Brassey, T. A. (1888). The Naval Annual 1887. London: J Griffin and Co.
- Lyon, David & Winfield, Rif (2004). The Sail and Steam Navy List: All the Ships of the Royal Navy 1815–1889. Chatham Publishing. ISBN 978-1-86176-032-6. OCLC 52620555.
