= RML 64-pounder 71 cwt gun =

Ordnance RML 64-pounder 71 cwt gun (converted)
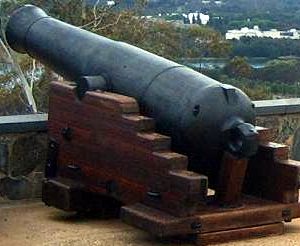
- No. 398 made by Royal Gun Factory in 1870, at the Royal Australian Artillery Memorial, Canberra
- Type: Naval gun Coast defence gun
- Place of origin: United Kingdom

Service history
- In service: 1870 – 190?
- Used by: Royal Navy; Australian Colonies

Production history
- Designed: 1870
- Manufacturer: Royal Arsenal

Specifications
- Mass: 7,896 pounds (3,582 kg)
- Barrel length: 103.27 inches (2.623 m) (bore)
- Shell: 64 pounds (29.03 kg)
- Calibre: 6.29-inch (159.8 mm)
- Muzzle velocity: 1,230 feet per second (370 m/s)

The RML 64-pounder 71 cwt guns (converted) were British rifled muzzle-loading guns converted from obsolete smoothbore 8-inch 65 cwt shell guns in the 1860s-1870s. (Note: "71 cwt" refers to the gun's weight rounded up to differentiate it from other "64-pounder" guns : 1 cwt = 112 pounds.)

== Design ==
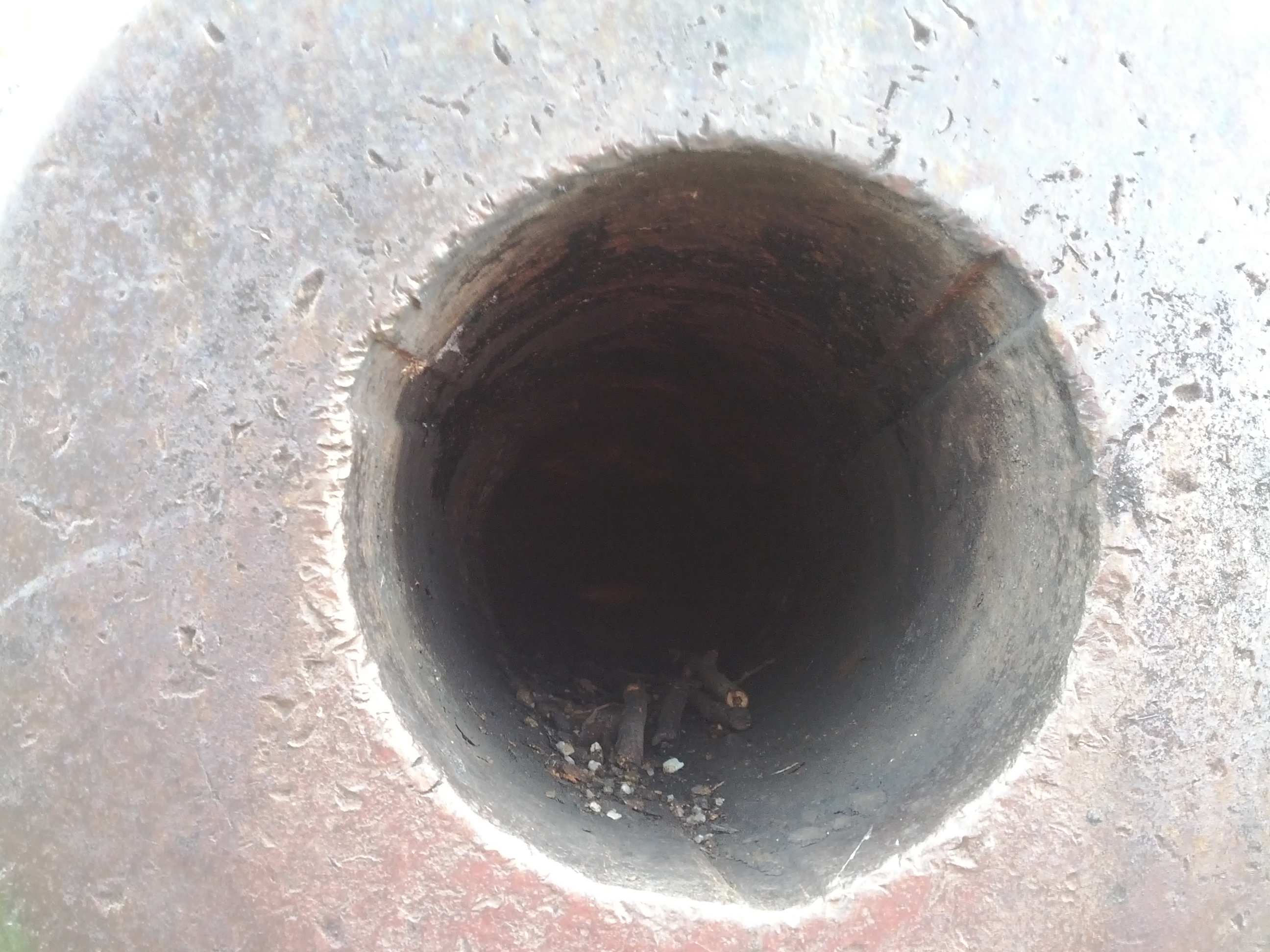
Three groove rifling system of the 64 Pounder

When Britain adopted rifled ordnance in the 1860s, it still had large stocks of serviceable but now obsolete smoothbore guns. Gun barrels were expensive to manufacture, so the best and most recent models were selected for conversion to rifled guns, for use as second-line ordnance, using a technique designed by William Palliser. The Palliser conversion was based on what was accepted as a sound principle that the strongest material in the barrel construction should be innermost, and hence a new tube of stronger wrought iron was inserted in the old cast iron barrel, rather than attempting to reinforce the old barrel from the outside.

This gun was based on the cast-iron barrel of the Millar Pattern 8-inch 65 cwt gun, originally designed in 1834. This was designed to fire a smooth bore spherical shell weighing 50 lb (23 kg). The 8 in (20 cm) gun was bored out to 10.5 in (27 cm) and a new built-up wrought iron inner tube with inner diameter of 6.29 in (16.0 cm) was inserted and fastened in place. The gun was then rifled with 3 grooves, with a uniform twist of 1 turn in 40 calibres (i.e. 1 turn in 252 in (640 cm)), and proof fired. The proof firing also served to expand the new tube slightly and ensure a tight fit in the old iron tube.

== Ammunition ==
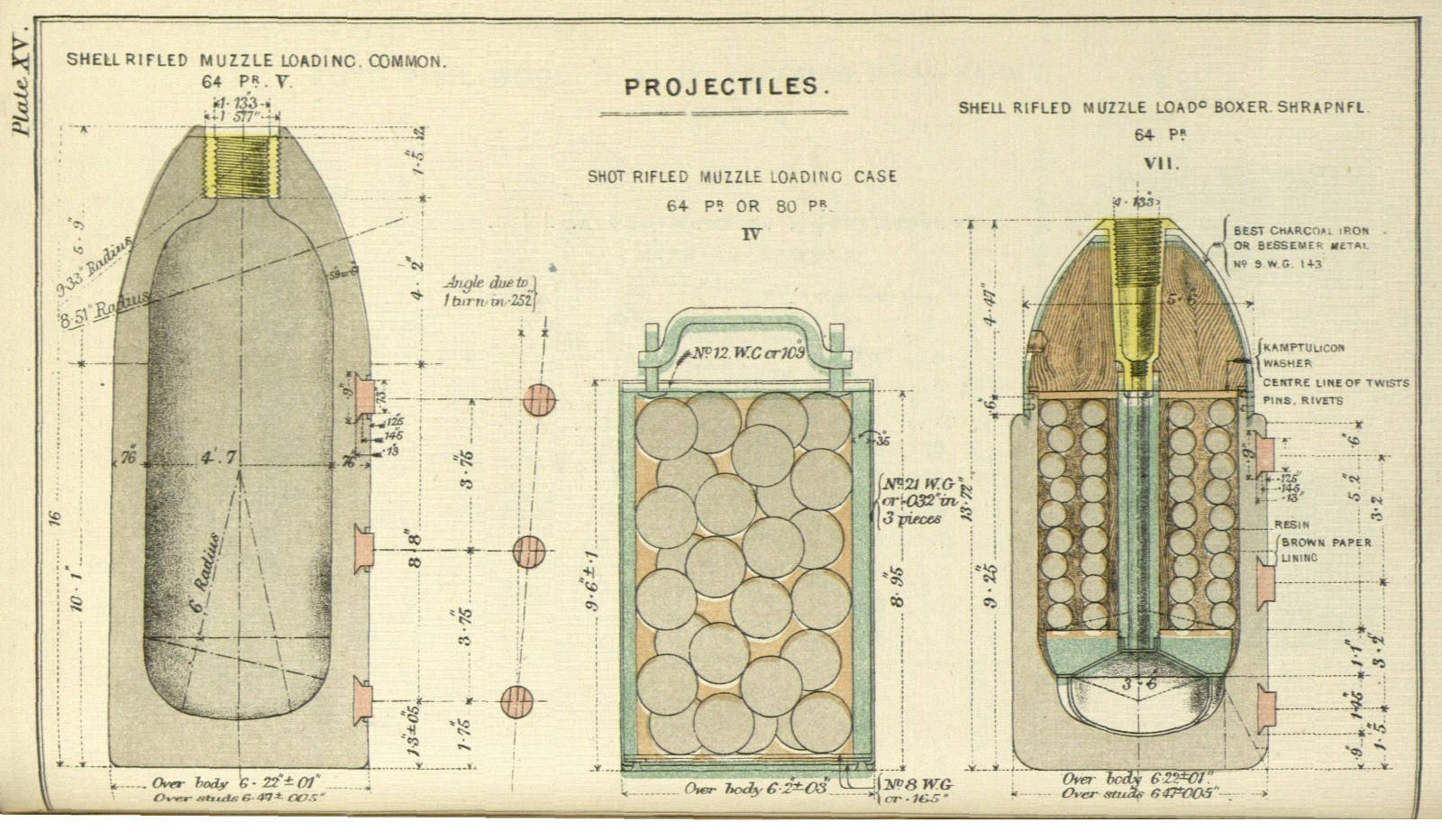
Ammunition diagram from the gun handbook, 1887

The 64-pounder used three types of ammunition. This ammunition was common to the other natures of 64 pounder gun - the 58 cwt converted gun and the 64 cwt gun. Although issued for sea service and many being sited on coastal artillery positions, their effectiveness against armour of heavily armoured ships was limited. Common shell could be used against buildings or fortifications, shrapnel shell (for use any Infantry or Cavalry) and case shot (for close range use against 'soft' targets. Ignition was through a copper lined vent at the breech end of the gun. A copper friction tube would be inserted and a lanyard attached. When the lanyard was pulled the tube would ignite, firing the gun. A number of different fuzes could be used enabling shells to either burst at a pre-determined time (and range), or on impact.

Guns were fired using a silk bag containing a black powder propellant. A typical rate of fire was one round every three minutes.

== Deployment ==
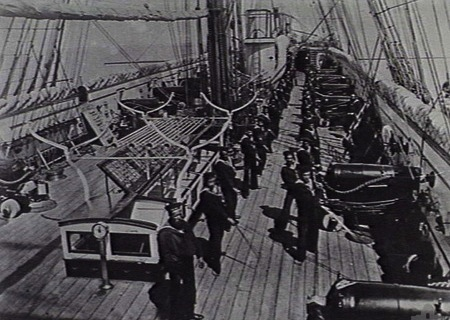
Broadside guns seen here on British screw corvette HMS Sapphire circa. 1878

This nature of gun was initially issued for Sea Service (SS), but by 1886 were obsolete in that role and were being returned to store for re-issue for Land Service (LS). In Naval service they were deployed on many smaller British cruising warships around the world.

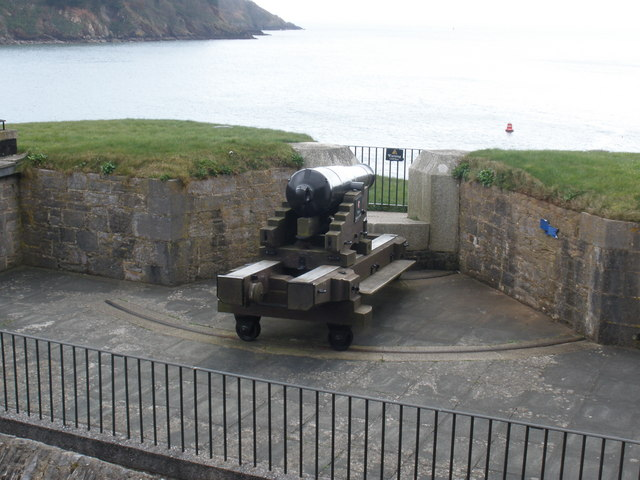
64-pounder Rifle Muzzle Loading (RML) 71 cwt gun, at Dartmouth Old Battery, guarding the entrance to Dartmouth harbour – geograph.org.uk – 1188459

In Land service many were mounted for coast defence in both British and colonial locations. They were mounted on a wide variety of iron and wooden carriages. They became obsolete for coast artillery use in 1902, whereupon most of them were scrapped and disposed of.

== See also ==
- RML 64-pounder 64 cwt gun the equivalent new design frontline 64-pounder gun
- List of naval guns

== Surviving examples ==
- Gun number 142, dated 1869 at St Helier, Jersey
- Gun Numbers 308 and 672 near the Lighthouse, Fredericton, New Brunswick, Canada
- Gun numbers 398 and 407 at the Royal Australian Artillery Memorial, Mount Pleasant, Canberra, Australia
- Gun number 483, dated 1870. One of two at the Old Battery, Dartmouth Castle, Devon, UK
- Gun number 574, dated 1871 at the Royal Armouries, Fort Nelson, Hampshire
- Gun number 581, dated 1871 at the Royal Armouries, Fort Nelson
- Gun number 681, dated 1871, Royal Armouries, Fort Nelson, Hampshire
- Gun number 709, dated 1872 at Southsea Castle, UK
- Gun number 721, dated 1874 at the old battery, Dartmouth Castle, Devon
- A gun at Mays Hill Cemetery, Parramatta, New South Wales, Australia
- A gun outside the wardroom at HMNZS Philomel, Auckland, New Zealand
- A gun on a locally-made carriage at Army Memorial Museum, Waiouru, New Zealand
- Gun at Fort St. Catherine, St George, Bermuda
- 2 Guns (1 complete with carriage) at Collins Barracks, Cork Ireland

== Bibliography ==
- Treatise on the Construction and Manufacture of Ordnance in the British Service. War Office, UK, 1879
