= Muzzle-loading rifle =

Class of rifle which is loaded through the muzzle of the barrel

A muzzle-loading rifle is a muzzle-loaded small arm that has a rifled barrel rather than a smoothbore, and is loaded from the muzzle of the barrel rather than the breech. Historically they were developed when rifled barrels were introduced by the 1740's, which offered higher accuracy than the earlier smoothbores. The American longrifle evolved from the German "Jäger" rifle; a popularly recognizable form of the "muzzleloader" was the Kentucky Rifle. Although by definition they must be reloaded after each shot in a time-consuming fashion, they are still produced for hunting.

Comparable artillery pieces are termed rifled muzzle loader (RML).

== Small arms ==
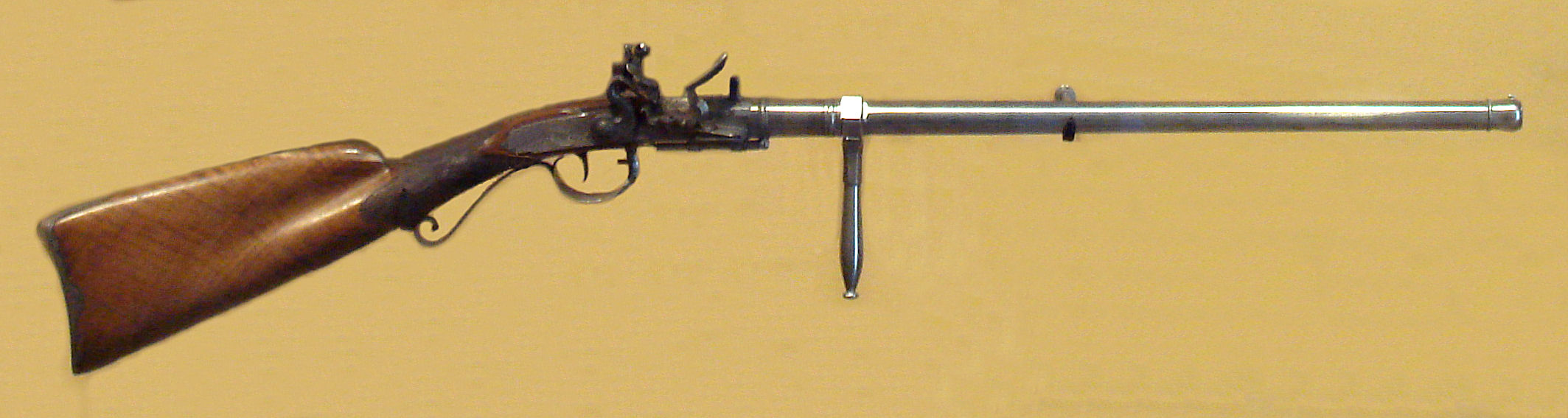
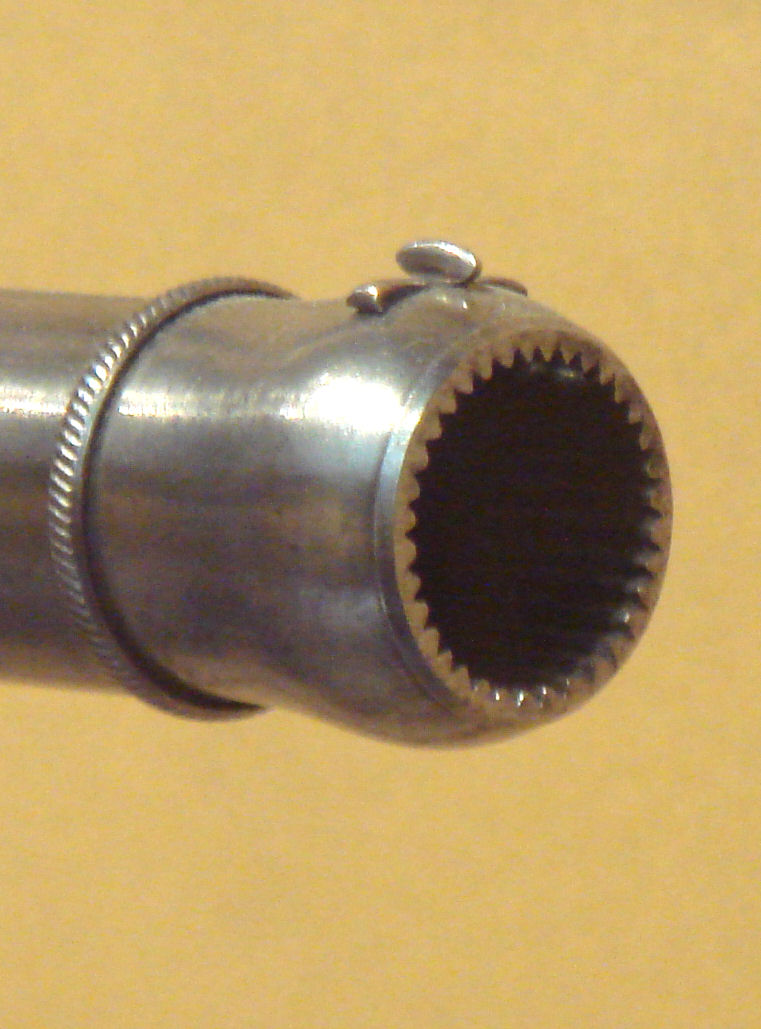
Left image: Jean Lepage silex carbine said "du Premier Consul", circa 1800.
Right image: Rifling of Lepage carbine.

Like most early firearms, the first rifles were muzzle-loading, although this involved a lot of complication in inserting the bullet past the rifling, and clogging and cleaning problems were notorious. There are also muzzle-loading pistols and shotguns. The Minié ball of the middle 19th century increased the rate of fire of rifles to match that of smoothbores, and rifled muzzle-loading small arms were rapidly adopted. These long rifles and similar weapons were used from about 1700 to 1900, but gradually gave way to firearms whose projectile is loaded into the chamber via the breech, without having to pass through the barrel.

== Artillery ==
=== La Hitte system ===
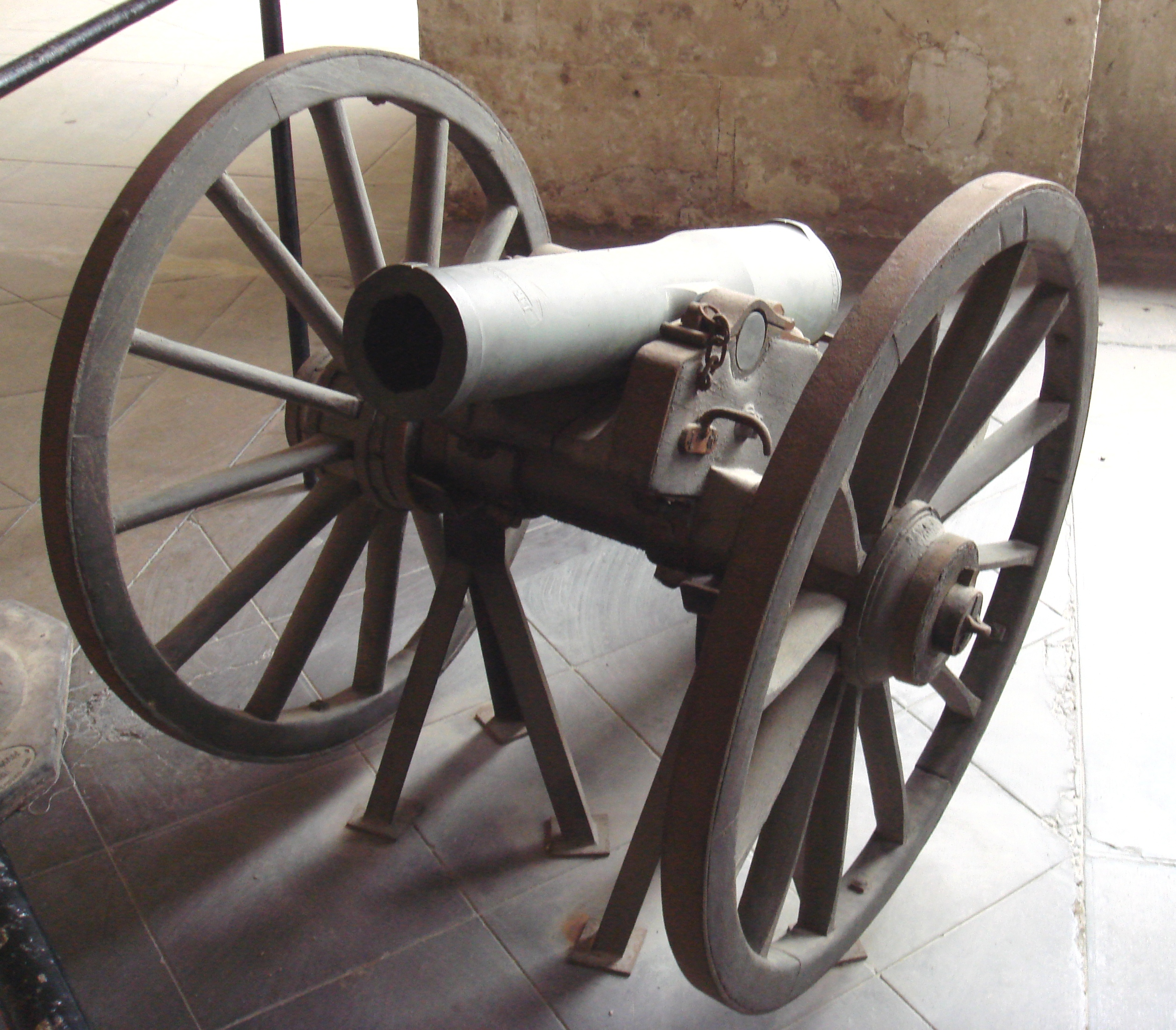
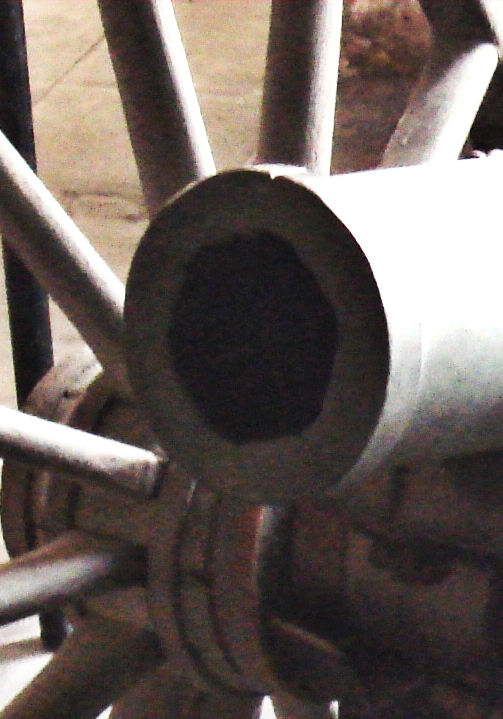
Left image: The La Hitte muzzle-loading rifle system was introduced in 1858. Rifled mountain cannon "Canon de montagne de 4 modèle 1859 Le Pétulant". Caliber: 86 mm. Length: 0.82 m. Weight: 101 kg (208 kg with carriage). Ammunition: 4 kg shell.
Right image: Hexagonal rifling of Le Pétulant (detail).
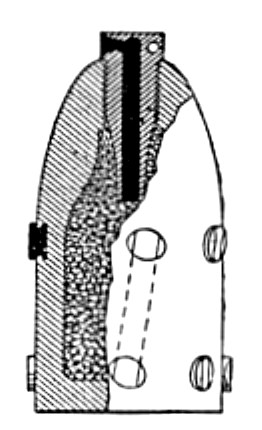
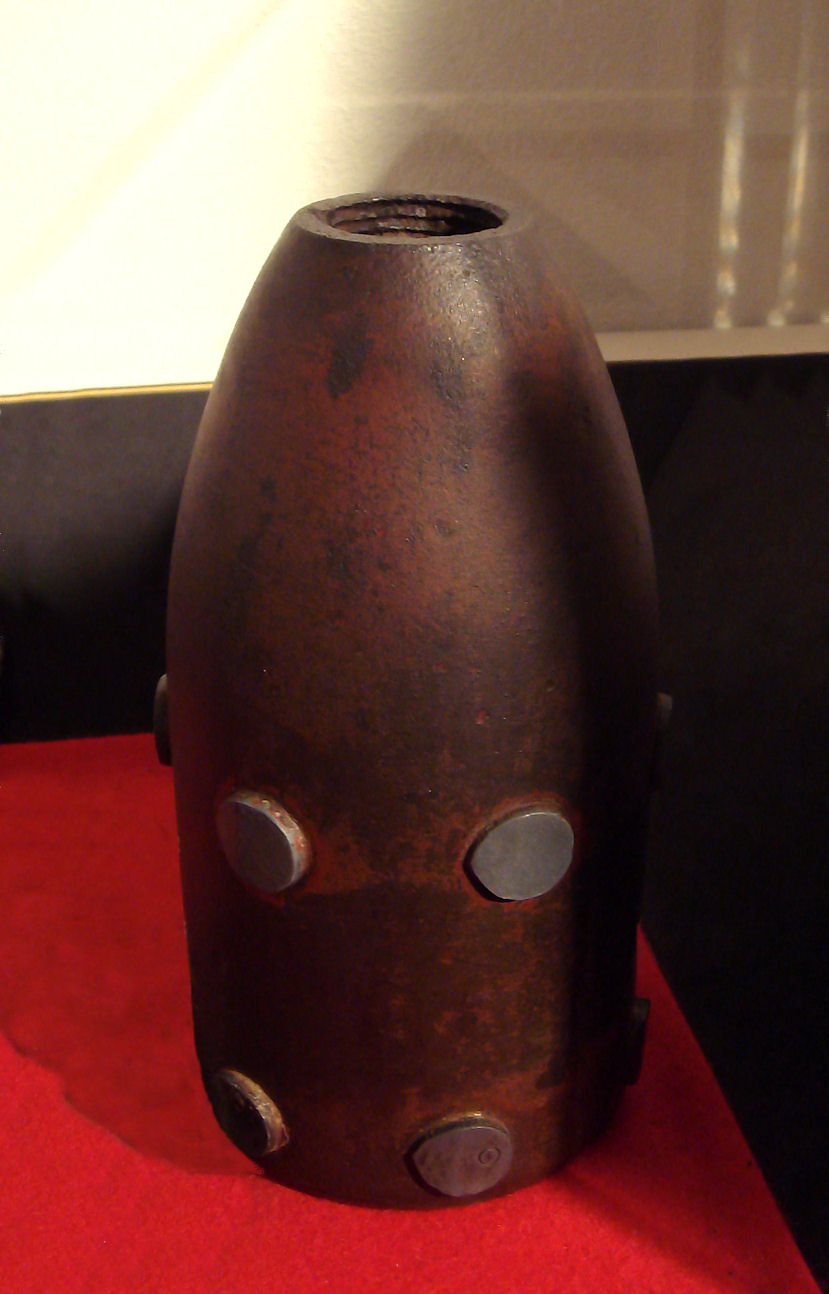
Left image: The La Hitte system was based around a shell equipped with lugs which allowed it to follow the rifle grooves inside the cannon bore.
Right image: Shell used in Japan during the Boshin War.

The La Hitte rifled guns were used from 1859 during the Franco-Austrian War in Italy. These guns were a considerable improvement over the previous smooth-bore guns which had been in use. They were able to shoot at 3,000 meters either regular shells, ball-loaded shells or grapeshot. They appear to have been the first case of usage of rifled cannons on a battlefield.

=== British Royal Navy ===
The muzzle-loading rifle was introduced into service in ships of the Royal Navy, after experimentation with alternative armament systems, after the failure of the Armstrong 100-pounder breech-loaders installed in 1860.

Until the middle of the 19th century Royal Navy warships had been armed with progressively larger smoothbore muzzle-loading cannon. These had by then approached their limit in terms of armour penetration, range and destructive power. It was known that rifled ordnance provided more accuracy, a greater range and more penetrative power, which was the rationale behind the development and on-board shipping of the breech-loading cannon developed by the company owned by Sir William Armstrong. These weapons, however, were dangerously prone to failure, frequently explosively, and an alternative armament became urgently necessary.

An initial attempt at an alternative was the 100-pounder smoothbore Somerset cannon, which, while it was an improvement over previous smoothbore guns of lesser calibre, could not penetrate armour of thicknesses currently being shipped by British or foreign battleships.

The type of gun finally adopted was a muzzle-loading weapon which fired projectiles with external studs which engaged with the rifling. This system was the "Woolwich" system; while it was possible with this system to fire shells at a higher muzzle velocity, and therefore with greater penetrative power, than before, the studs tended to shear, there was excessive wear of the gun liner, and the shells tended to wobble in flight. Furthermore, the muzzle velocity obtainable in these guns was no more than half of that obtained in interrupted screw breeched guns of the following century. There were several reasons for this: the shell could not be made to fit too closely into the bore of the gun, as it would not have been possible to ram it home; the velocity of a shell depends, among other factors, on the length of the gun barrel, and the need to load through the muzzle necessitated a short barrel so as to make the muzzle accessible to the loaders; later types of explosive were superior; and metallurgical techniques improved to allow a higher initial pressure in the breech of the gun.

=== Rifled muzzle loaders ===
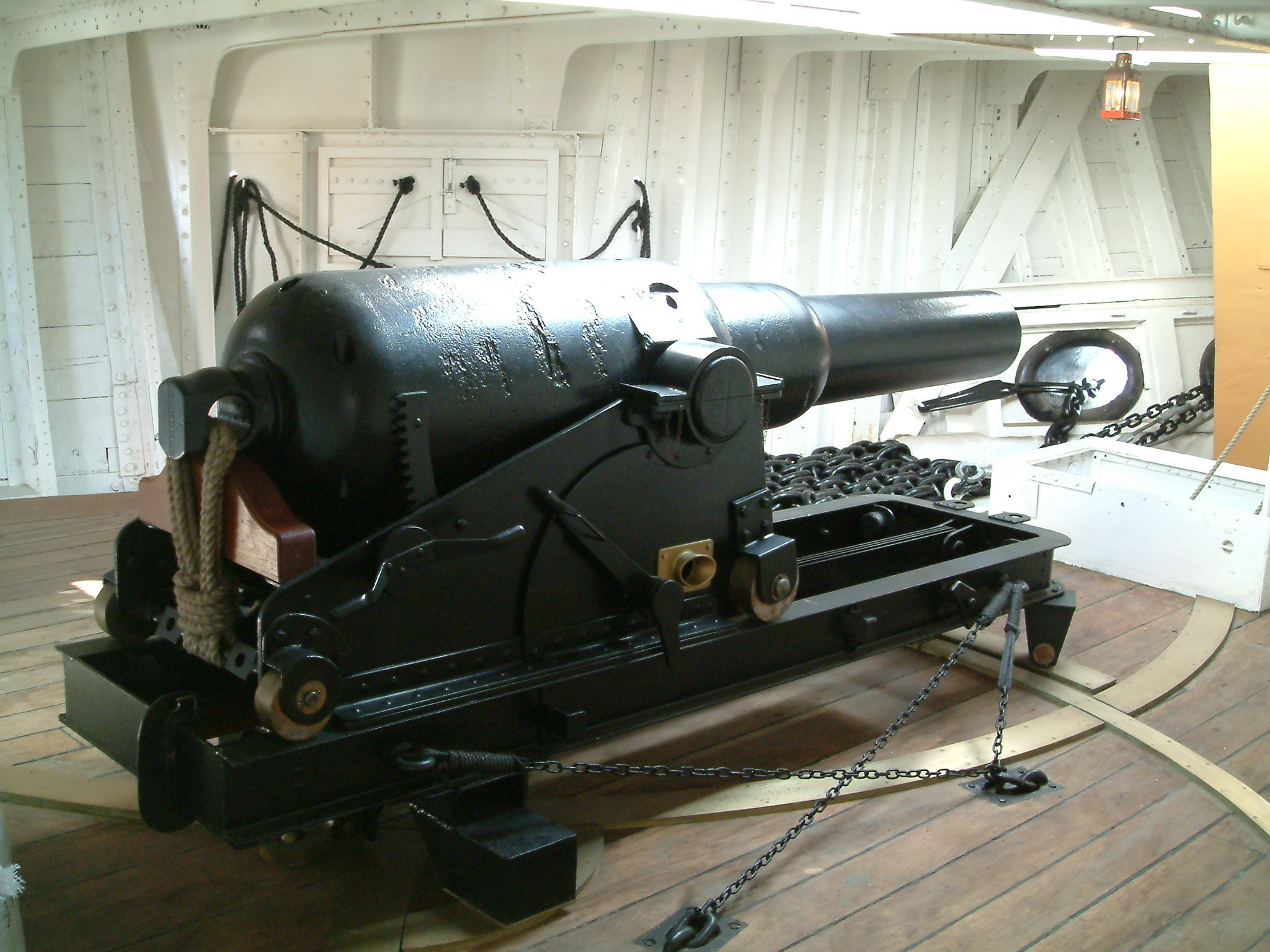
A 6.3 inch 64-pounder rifled muzzle loader in the forecastle of HMS Gannet (1878)

Rifled muzzle loader (RMLs) are artillery pieces of muzzle-loading rifle format, invented in the mid-19th century. In contrast to smooth bore cannon which preceded it, the rifling of the gun barrel allowed much greater accuracy and penetration as the spin induced to the shell gave it directional stability. Typical guns weighed 30 tonnes with 10" diameter muzzles, and were installed in forts and ships.

This new gun and the rifled breech loader generated a huge arms race in the late 19th century, with rapid advances in fortifications and ironclad warships.

In the British navy, many smaller 64-pounder smoothbore guns were converted to rifled weapons: the converted guns were called RMLs, whilst weapons manufactured with rifling were termed muzzle-loading rifles. This distinction did not survive with the larger calibres, which were generally all called RMLs.

Many artillery pieces were converted from older smooth bore weapons once technical problems in strengthening the original cast iron body had been overcome. The widely adopted solution, invented in 1863 by William Palliser, consisted of enlarging the bore to accept a wrought iron tube (called the A tube) into which the rifling had been cut. The A tube was closed at the breech end by a wrought iron cup screwed into it. Iron was removed from the outside of the original gun barrel near to the muzzle so that a cast iron collar could be screwed over it and provide a shoulder at the muzzle to hold the A tube in place. The A tube was also held by a plug screwed into the gun underneath its trunnions. The outside of the breech portion was turned on a lathe so that another wrought iron tube, called the B tube, could be slid over it to strengthen it.

=== Aboard ships ===
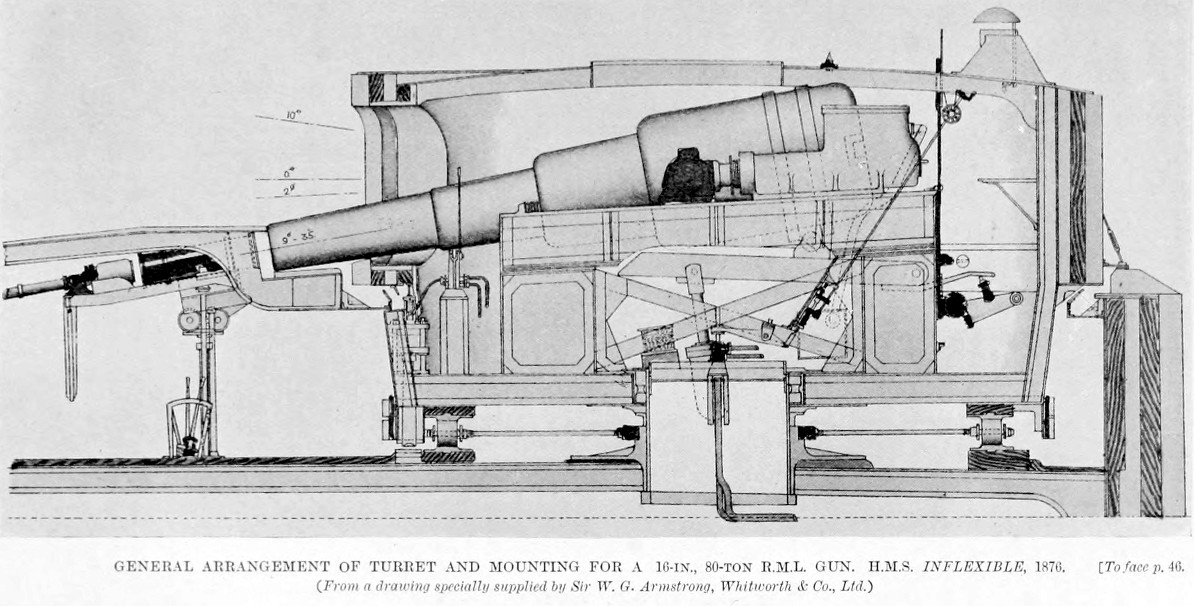
The reloading mechanism onboard HMS Inflexible.

The largest RML carried on a warship was the Elswick Ordnance Company's 17.7 inch (450-mm) 100 ton gun of the 1870s, four of which were installed in each of the Italian ironclads Duilio and Enrico Dandolo (launched in 1876 and 1878, respectively). The Royal Navy at the time was restricted to the weapons produced by Woolwich Arsenal, so that the heaviest guns that could be shipped were the 80 ton 16 inch guns of HMS Inflexible.

During this period rapid burning black powder was used as the propellant, so the guns had a stubby, 'soda bottle' shape giving easy access to either end for loading. The RBLs of the time were notably weaker in the breech region, and more prone to failure.

A catastrophic accident on board HMS Thunderer in January 1879, in which a 35-ton 12 inch muzzle loader hung fire and was subsequently double-loaded (causing catastrophic failure when fired again), motivated the Admiralty to re-consider the rifled breech loaders, as it is generally impossible to double load a breechloader.

Improvements in breech mechanisms in the period 1860 to 1880, together with the introduction of large grain powder, caused the Navy to re-adopt the RBL as the new powder required longer barrels which could not be withdrawn into the turret for loading. A new 12-inch gun was developed for HMS Edinburgh in 1879, but burst during trials. Following modifications the new weapon proved reliable.

== See also ==
- Rifled musket
