= List of shipwrecks in May 1862 =

The list of shipwrecks in May 1862 includes ships sunk, foundered, grounded, or otherwise lost during May 1862.

== 1 May ==
List of shipwrecks: 1 May 1862
Ship	State	Description
Dora	United Kingdom	The ship ran aground on The Platters, off Anglesey and sank. She was on a voyage from Cardiff, Glamorgan to Liverpool, Lancashire.
Edwards	(United Kingdom of Great Britain and Ireland) New Zealand	The schooner was wrecked when driven ashore at Waitangi in New Zealand's Chatham Islands during a heavy gale. The crew all survived, but the ship and cargo were lost.
Hoop	Grand Duchy of Oldenburg	The ship was wrecked at Aveiro, Portugal. She was on a voyage from Aveiro to Liverpool.
Sarah	United Kingdom	American Civil War, Union blockade: Pursued by the armed clipper USS Onward (United States Navy), the 100-ton schooner, a blockade runner with assorted cargo from Nassau in the Bahamas, ran aground at Bulls Bay, South Carolina, Confederate States of America and was subsequently burned by her crew to prevent Onward from capturing her.

== 2 May ==
List of shipwrecks: 2 May 1862
Ship	State	Description
Massilia	United Kingdom	The paddle steamer ran aground off the Castillo de Guardias Viejas, Spain. She was on a voyage from Gibraltar to Malta. She was refloated the next day and resumed her voyage.
Oregon	United States	The barque was wrecked at Guimbering, Senegal.
Shuttle	United Kingdom	The ship ran aground and sank off Bermuda. Her crew were rescued. She was on a voyage from Trinidad to London.

== 3 May ==
List of shipwrecks: 3 May 1862
Ship	State	Description
Almira	United Kingdom	The full-rigged ship ran aground on the Beaumont Shoals, in the Saint Lawrence River 5 nautical miles (9.3 km) downstream of Quebec City, Province of Canada, British North America. She was on a voyage from Quebec City to Liverpool, Lancashire.
Bee	United Kingdom	The ship was driven ashore and destroyed by fire at La Roch, Province of Canada, British North America. Her crew were rescued. She was on a voyage from Liverpool, Lancashire to Quebec City, Province of Canada.
Glenroy	United Kingdom	The ship was driven ashore at Diamond Harbour, India. She was on a voyage from Liverpool to Calcutta, India.
Pride of Canada	(United Kingdom of Great Britain and Ireland) British North America	The ship was driven ashore on Caribou Island, Province of Canada with the loss of three of her crew. She was refloated on 8 July.
Tangier	United Kingdom	The ship was forcibly seized and run aground in the Saint Lawrence River 2.5 nautical miles (4.6 km) upstream of Bathurst, New Brunswick, British North America. She was on a voyage from Bathurst to New York and Liverpool, Lancashire.
Uncle Tom	(United Kingdom of Great Britain and Ireland) Straits Settlements	The ship was driven ashore and wrecked on Formosa with the loss of 37 of the 40 people on board. She was on a voyage from "Amary" to Formosa.

== 4 May ==
List of shipwrecks: 4 May 1862
Ship	State	Description
CSS Beauregard	Confederate States Navy	American Civil War: Bound from City Point, to Norfolk, Virginia, with a cargo of coal for the broadside ironclad CSS Virginia (Confederate States Navy), the schooner was captured and burned by Union forces at Ragged Island on the James River.
Champion	Confederate States of America	American Civil War: Loaded with Confederate States Army stores and muskets, the sloop was burned by Confederate forces on the York River about 9 miles (14.5 km) above Gloucester Point, Virginia to prevent her capture by the armed sidewheel paddle steamer USS Corwin (United States Navy).
CSS General Scott	Confederate States Navy	American Civil War: The guard boat, a steamer loaded with Confederate States Army stores, was burned by Confederate forces on the York River about 9 miles (14.5 km) above Gloucester Point to prevent her capture by the armed sidewheel paddle steamer USS Corwin (United States Navy).
Hook	United Kingdom	The ship was wrecked at Aveiro, Portugal. She was on a voyage from Aveiro to Liverpool, Lancashire.
Protector	United Kingdom	The ship ran aground at Amble, Northumberland. She was on a voyage from Amble to Kronstadt, Russia. She was refloated but put in to South Shields, County Durham, where she also ran aground.
Shakespeare	United States	The ship was driven ashore in the Hooghly River. She was on a voyage from Calcutta, India to London, United Kingdom. She had been refloated by 8 May.
Trial	United Kingdom	The brig was wrecked on the Barber Sand, in the North Sea off the coast of Norfolk. Her seven crew were rescued by the Caistor Lifeboat, which was severely damaged by collisions with the wreck. She was on a voyage from Hartlepool, County Durham to Poole, Dorset.
Wolf's Cove	United Kingdom	The barque was driven ashore near Quebec City, Province of Canada, British North America. Her crew were rescued. She was on a voyage from the Clyde to Quebec City.

== 5 May ==
List of shipwrecks: 5 May 1862
Ship	State	Description
Aurelia	France	The ship foundered 12 nautical miles (22 km) north north east of Ouessant, Finistère. Her crew were rescued. She was on a voyage from Swansea, Glamorgan, United Kingdom to San Sebastián, Spain.
City Belle	Confederate States of America	The 215-ton sidewheel paddle steamer burned on the Red River of the South at Alexandria, Louisiana.
Dannebod	Denmark	The ship ran aground on the Shipwash Sand, in the North Sea off the coast of Suffolk, United Kingdom. She was on a voyage from Hørsholm to London, United Kingdom. She was refloated the next day and assisted in to Lowestoft, Suffolk.
Mrs. Ashton Smith	United Kingdom	The ship was beached at Penrhyn Point, Caernarfonshire in a sinking condition. She was on a voyage from Runcorn, Cheshire to Caernarfon.

== 6 May ==
List of shipwrecks: 6 May 1862
Ship	State	Description
Cherokee	United States	The barque was wrecked on Bressay, Shetland Islands, United Kingdom. She was on a voyage from Sunderland, County Durham, United Kingdom to Havana, Cuba.
Fashion	Confederate States of America	American Civil War, Union blockade: Attempting to run the Union blockade to take a cargo of cotton and turpentine to Havana, Cuba, the steamer was chased onto a reef in Berwick Bay in Louisiana by the gunboat USS Hatteras (United States Navy) and was burned by her crew to prevent her capture by Hatteras.

== 7 May ==
List of shipwrecks: 7 May 1862
Ship	State	Description
John Hastings	(United Kingdom of Great Britain and Ireland) British North America	The schooner capsized 15 nautical miles (28 km) south of St. Peter's Lighthouse, Newfoundland with the loss of three of her five crew. Survivors were rescued the next day by Velocity (United Kingdom). John Hastings was on a voyage from Liverpool, Nova Scotia to Saint John's, Newfoundland.
Mont Blanc	United Kingdom	The ship was driven ashore at Peaked Hill, Massachusetts, United States. She was on a voyage from South Shields, County Durham to Boston, Massachusetts. She was refloated on 10 May.
Panama	United Kingdom	The barque was abandoned in the Atlantic Ocean (45°02′N 10°20′W). Her crew were rescued by Rose Chinnery (United Kingdom).

== 8 May ==
List of shipwrecks: 8 May 1862
Ship	State	Description
Danube	United Kingdom	The steamship ran aground on the West Hoyle Sandbank, in Liverpool Bay and broke in two. She was on a voyage from Alexandria, Egypt to Liverpool, Lancashire.
Edwin	Unknown	American Civil War, Union blockade: Attempting to run the Union blockade during a voyage from Nassau in the Bahamas to Charleston, South Carolina, Confederate States of America with a cargo of dry goods, the schooner was forced aground on Morris Island near Lighthouse Inlet off the coast of South Carolina by the armed sidewheel paddle steamer USS Alabama (United States Navy).
Valetta	United Kingdom	The ship ran aground off Seacombe, Cheshire. She was on a voyage from Bordeaux, Gironde, France to Liverpool, Lancashire. She was refloated with assistance from the tug Secretary (United Kingdom) and towed in to Liverpool.
Unidentified schooner	Unknown	American Civil War, Union blockade: A schooner was forced aground at Lighthouse Inlet by the armed sidewheel paddle steamer USS Alabama (United States Navy).

== 9 May ==
List of shipwrecks: 9 May 1862
Ship	State	Description
USS Galena	United States Navy	American Civil War: The ironclad ran aground in the James River. She was refloated on 10 May.
George	United Kingdom	The ship ran aground on the Newcombe Sand, in the North Sea off the coast of Suffolk. She was on a voyage from Sunderland, County Durham to London.
Helen	Confederate States of America	American Civil War: The steam guard boat was burned by Confederate States Army troops at Pensacola, Florida, to prevent her capture by Union forces.
Mary	Confederate States of America	American Civil War: The steam guard boat was burned by Confederate States Army troops at Pensacola to prevent her capture by Union forces.
Queen of the Isles	United Kingdom	The ship ran aground on the Girdler Sand. She was on a voyage from Guernsey, Channel Islands to London. She had become a wreck by 16 May.
Ringleader	United States	The clipper was wrecked on the Formosa Banks with the loss of two of her crew. She was on a voyage from Hong Kong to San Francisco, California.
HMS St George	Royal Navy	The Caledonia-class ship of the line ran aground in the Firth of Forth off Burntisland, Fife. She was refloated.

== 10 May ==
List of shipwrecks: 10 May 1862
Ship	State	Description
Amazon	Confederate States of America	American Civil War: Confederate forces scuttled the schooner as a blockship at Warmick Bar in the James River in Virginia.
USS Cincinnati	United States Navy	American Civil War, Battle of Plum Point Bend: The casemate ironclad sank in shallow water in the Mississippi River near Fort Pillow, Tennessee, with 35 killed and wounded after being rammed by the ram CSS General Bragg (Confederate States Navy). She was refloated, repaired, and returned to service.
Dalhousie	(United Kingdom of Great Britain and Ireland) British North America	The full-rigged ship capsized at Montreal, Province of canada.
CSS Fulton	Confederate States Navy	American Civil War: The sidewheel paddle steamer was burned by Confederate forces while laid up at the Pensacola Navy Yard in Pensacola, Florida, to prevent her capture by Union forces.
CSS Germantown	Confederate States Navy	American Civil War: The floating battery was filled and sand and sunk as a blockship in the Elizabeth River in Virginia by Confederate forces. Union forces refloated her in April 1863.
USS Mound City	United States Navy	American Civil War, Battle of Plum Point Bend: The casemate ironclad ran herself aground in the Mississippi River near Fort Pillow Tennessee, to avoid sinking after being rammed by the ram CSS General Earl Van Dorn (Confederate States Navy). She was refloated, repaired, and returned to service.
CSS Norfolk	Confederate States Navy	American Civil War: The incomplete screw gunboat was burned on the building ways at Gosport Navy Yard in Portsmouth, Virginia, to prevent her capture by Union forces.
CSS Plymouth	Confederate States Navy	American Civil War: The sloop-of-war was scuttled at the Gosport Navy Yard to prevent her capture by Union forces.
CSS Portsmouth	Confederate States Navy	American Civil War: The incomplete screw gunboat was burned on the building ways at Gosport Navy Yard, to prevent her capture by Union forces.

== 11 May ==
List of shipwrecks: 11 May 1862
Ship	State	Description
Prebeslaw	Grand Duchy of Mecklenburg-Schwerin	The ship ran aground on the Drogden. She was on a voyage from Memel, Prussia to Hull, Yorkshire. She was refloated and put in to Copenhagen, Denmark for repairs.
CSS Virginia	Confederate States Navy	Currier and Ives lithograph of the scuttling of CSS Virginia American Civil War: The casemate ironclad was scuttled by exploding her black powder magazine in Hampton Roads off Craney Island, Virginia, to prevent her capture by Union forces after she ran aground.
William Seldon	Confederate States of America	American Civil War: Confederate forces burned the 378-ton sidewheel paddle steamer at Norfolk, Virginia, to prevent her capture by Union forces.

== 12 May ==
List of shipwrecks: 12 May 1862
Ship	State	Description
Beechworth	United Kingdom	The ship struck the Caranja Shoal, off Bombay, India and was wrecked.
Harpley	United Kingdom	The ship ran aground and broke in two at "Realijo", Chile. She was on a voyage from Glasgow, Renfrewshire to San Francisco, California, United States. She was a total loss.

== 14 May ==
List of shipwrecks: 14 May 1862
Ship	State	Description
Ethel	United Kingdom	The ship struck a sunken wreck in the Irish Sea. She was on a voyage from Bombay, India to Liverpool, Lancashire. She arrived at Liverpool in a waterlogged condition and heeled over.
Pioneer	United Kingdom	The full-rigged ship foundered off Cape Race, Newfoundland, British North America having struck an iceberg the previous day. All on board were rescued by the tug Blue Jacket (United Kingdom). Pioneer was on a voyage from Hull, Yorkshire to Quebec City, Province of Canada, British North America.

== 15 May ==
List of shipwrecks: 15 May 1862
Ship	State	Description
Cumberland	United Kingdom	The steamship was driven ashore on Saaremaa, Russia. She was on a voyage from London to Saint Petersburg, Russia.
CSS Jamestown	Confederate States Navy	A Mathew Brady photograph of the wreck of CSS Jamestown. American Civil War: The sidewheel paddle steamer, also known as CSS Thomas Jefferson, was scuttled as a blockship in the James River at Drewry's Bluff, Virginia.

== 16 May ==
List of shipwrecks: 16 May 1862
Ship	State	Description
Eastern Nab	United Kingdom	The schooner collided with the steamship Boreas (United Kingdom) and sank in the North Sea off the coast of Norfolk with the loss of four of the nine people on board. Survivors were rescued by Boreas. Eastern Nab was on a voyage from Stockton-on-Tees, County Durham to London.
Eliza	United Kingdom	The schooner was wrecked on the Proudicot Rocks, in Wick Bay. Her crew were rescued. She was on a voyage from Rosehearty, Moray to Stornoway, Isle of Lewis, Outer Hebrides.
Ferdig	Sweden	The galiot ran aground and was severely damaged at North Shields, Northumberland, United Kingdom. She was on a voyage from Gotland to North Shields.
Foster	United Kingdom	The full-rigged ship was wrecked on the east coast of Grenada. Her crew were rescued. She was on a voyage from Saint Helena to Ascension Island, Jamaica and London.
Heroine	United Kingdom	The ship was wrecked at "Penmalloch", Isle of Mull. Her crew were rescued. She was on a voyage from the Ross of Mull to Glasgow, Renfrewshire.
Oriental	United States	American Civil War: The 1,202-ton screw transport was lost off the coast of North Carolina, Confederate States of America at Bodie Island. All on board were rescued.

== 17 May ==
List of shipwrecks: 17 May 1862
Ship	State	Description
Alert	Confederate States of America	American Civil War: The full-rigged ship was scuttled in the Pamunkey River at Bassett's Landing, 25 miles (40 km) above White House, Virginia.
Ann Bell	Confederate States of America	American Civil War: The full-rigged ship was scuttled in the Pamunkey River at Bassett's Landing.
Betsey Richards	Confederate States of America	American Civil War: The full-rigged ship was scuttled as a blockship by Confederate forces in the Pamunkey River at Bassett's Landing.
Francis and Theodore	Confederate States of America	American Civil War: The full-rigged ship was burned on the Pamunkey River at Bassett's Landing.
J. R. Baylis	Confederate States of America	American Civil War: The full-rigged ship sank in the Pamunkey River near Bassett's Landing.
James Braden	Confederate States of America	American Civil War: The full-rigged ship was scuttled in the Pamunkey River at Bassett's Landing.
Jefferson	Confederate States of America	American Civil War: The transport was burned by Confederate forces on the Pamunkey River near New Castle, Virginia, to prevent her capture by Union forces.
John Allen	Confederate States of America	American Civil War: The schooner was scuttled as a blockship by Confederate forces in the Pamunkey River at Bassett's Landing.
Little Wave	Confederate States of America	American Civil War: The full-rigged ship was scuttled as a blockship by Confederate forces in the Pamunkey River at Bassett's Landing.
Logan	Confederate States of America	American Civil War: The sidewheel paddle steamer was burned on the Pamunkey River at Bassett's Landing to prevent her capture by the approaching gunboat USS Currituck and tug Seth Low.
Margaret Schultz	Confederate States of America	American Civil War: The full-rigged ship was burned on the Pamunkey River at New Castle, Virginia to prevent her capture by Union forces.
Mary Alice	Confederate States of America	American Civil War: The full-rigged ship was scuttled as a blockship by Confederate forces in the Pamunkey River at Bassett's Landing
Mary Baxter	Confederate States of America	American Civil War: The full-rigged ship was scuttled as a blockship by Confederate forces in the Pamunkey River at Bassett's Landing.
Mirage	Confederate States of America	American Civil War: The full-rigged ship was scuttled as a blockship by Confederate forces in the Pamunkey River at Bassett's Landing.
O. Whitmond	Confederate States of America	American Civil War: The full-rigged ship was scuttled and burned by Confederate forces on the Pamunkey River near New Castle, Virginia.
Oxford	Confederate States of America	American Civil War: The 85-ton schooner was scuttled as a blockship by Confederate forces in the Pamunkey River at Bassett's Landing.
Paragon	Confederate States of America	American Civil War: The sloop was scuttled as a blockship by Confederate forces in the Pamunkey River near Bassett's Landing.
Sarah Washington	Confederate States of America	American Civil War: The schooner was scuttled by Confederate forces in the Pamunkey River at Bassett's Landing.
Sea Witch	Confederate States of America	American Civil War: The full-rigged ship was scuttled by Confederate forces in the Pamunkey River at Bassett's Landing.
Thornaby	United Kingdom	The ship was run into by Lyna (Norway) and was beached at Montrose, Forfarshire in a sinking condition.
Union	Confederate States of America	American Civil War: The full-rigged ship was scuttled by Confederate forces in the Pamunkey River at Bassett's Landing.
Virginia	Confederate States of America	American Civil War: The full-rigged ship was scuttled as a blockship by Confederate forces in the Pamunkey River at New Castle, Virginia.
Walton	Confederate States of America	American Civil War: The full-rigged ship was scuttled as a blockship by Confederate forces in the Pamunkey River at New Castle, Virginia.
Watchman	Confederate States of America	American Civil War: The vessel was scuttled by Confederate forces in the Pamunkey River at New Castle, Virginia.
Wave	Confederate States of America	American Civil War: The vessel was scuttled by Confederate forces in the Pamunkey River at New Castle, Virginia.
Wicherdina	Netherlands	The galiot foundered 25 nautical miles (46 km) west of Cape Finisterre, Spain. Her crew were rescued.
Wild Pigeon	Confederate States of America	American Civil War: The vessel was scuttled by Confederate forces in the Pamunkey River near Bassett's Landing.
William and Wesley	Unknown	American Civil War: The vessel was scuttled by Confederate forces in the Pamunkey River near Bassett's Landing.
William Francis	Confederate States of America	American Civil War: The vessel was scuttled by Confederate forces in the Pamunkey River near Bassett's Landing.
William S. Ryland	Unknown	American Civil War: The full-rigged ship was burned by Confederate forces in the Pamunkey River at New Castle, Virginia.
William Shamberg	Unknown	American Civil War: The schooner was scuttled by Confederate forces in the Pamunkey River at New Castle, Virginia.

== 19 May ==
List of shipwrecks: 19 May 1862
Ship	State	Description
Bothnia	Flag unknown	The schooner foundered of Dunnose, Isle of Wight, United Kingdom. Her crew were rescued by the pilot boat Cupid (United Kingdom). Bothnia was on a voyage from Pau to Brussels, Belgium.

== 20 May ==
List of shipwrecks: 20 May 1862
Ship	State	Description
Ancona	United Kingdom	The ship was driven ashore by ice near Kronstadt, Russia. She was on a voyage from Hartlepool, County Durham to Kronstadt.
Ann and Sarah	United Kingdom	The ship was driven ashore by ice near Kronstadt. She was on a voyage from Hartlepool to Kronstadt. She was later refloated and taken in to Kronstadt.
Geertina	Netherlands	The ship was driven ashore by ice near Kronstadt. She was on a voyage from Newcastle upon Tyne, Northumberland to Kronstadt. She was refloated on 22 May and taken in to Kronstadt.
Harriet	(United Kingdom of Great Britain and Ireland) Jersey	The smack was wrecked near Bembridge, Isle of Wight. Her crew were rescued. She was on a voyage from Jersey to Hartlepool.
Henry	United Kingdom	The ship was driven ashore by ice near Kronstadt. She was on a voyage from St. Davids, Pembrokeshire to Kronstadt.
J. R. Simpson	United Kingdom	The ship foundered in the Irish Sea. A message in a bottle giving this information was discovered at Dyffryn Cennen, Carmarthenshire on 29 May.

== 22 May ==
List of shipwrecks: 22 May 1862
Ship	State	Description
Elizabeth	United Kingdom	The ship collided with a steamship and foundered off the Kentish Knock with the loss of a crew member. Survivors were rescued by Harriet (United Kingdom). Elizabeth was on a voyage from South Shields, County Durham to Honfleur, Manche, France.
Joseph	Confederate States of America	American Civil War: The brig was burned on the Waccamaw River in South Carolina to prevent her capture by Union forces when United States Navy gunboats were sighted near Georgetown, South Carolina.
Newcastle	United Kingdom	The steamship was driven ashore at Kettleness, Yorkshire. She was on a voyage from Hull, Yorkshire to Newcastle upon Tyne, Northumberland. She was refloated with at assistance of tow tugs and resumed her voyage.
Salacia	United Kingdom	The ship was wrecked on a reef in the South China Sea. Her crew survived. She was on a voyage from Singapore, Straits Settlements to Falmouth, Cornwall.

== 23 May ==
List of shipwrecks: 23 May 1862
Ship	State	Description
Mary Lungley	United Kingdom	The ship departed from Chañaral, Chie for Liverpool, Lancashire. No further trace, presumed foundered with the loss of all hands.
Star King	United Kingdom	The ship ran aground off Point Romance and sank. She was on a voyage from Melbourne, Victoria to Singapore, Straits Settlements.

== 24 May ==
List of shipwrecks: 24 May 1862
Ship	State	Description
Henry Livingstone	United Kingdom	The ship departed from Antigua for Liverpool, Lancashire. No further trace, presumed foundered with the loss of all hands.
Impetus	United Kingdom	The ship ran aground off Barbados and was wrecked. Her crew were rescued.
Lady Franklin	United Kingdom	The barque, on a voyage from Jamaica to Liverpool, ran ground on Carysfort Reef, Florida and was wrecked.

== 25 May ==
List of shipwrecks: 25 May 1862
Ship	State	Description
Kate	Flag unknown	American Civil War, Union blockade: After being forced to run ashore on the east end of Sullivan's Island near Breach Inlet off Charleston, South Carolina, by the armed sidewheel paddle steamer USS Augusta (United States Navy), the schooner was shelled during a storm by the armed screw steamer USS Pocahontas and the armed schooner USS G. W. Blunt (both United States Navy).
Nellie	Confederate States of America	American Civil War, Union blockade: Attempting to run the Union blockade from Nassau, Bahamas to Charleston, South Carolina, with a cargo of medicine and merchandise, the sidewheel paddle steamer was run aground off Charleston either on the south end North Island or on Isle of Palms after a United States Navy armed schooner fired on her off Dewee Island.

== 27 May ==
List of shipwrecks: 27 May 1862
Ship	State	Description
Pocahontas	United States	The 426-ton screw steamer was stranded at Long Point, Province of Canada, British North America.
President Van San	Netherlands	The ship was driven ashore and wrecked between Seaford and Newhaven, Sussex, United Kingdom.

== 28 May ==
List of shipwrecks: 28 May 1862
Ship	State	Description
Turon	United Kingdom	The ship ran aground on the Fulta Sand. She was on a voyage from Liverpool, Lancashire to Bombay, India.

== 29 May ==
List of shipwrecks: 29 May 1862
Ship	State	Description
Fear Not	United Kingdom	The barque ran aground on the Goodwin Sands, Kent. She was on a voyage from the River Tyne to Genoa, Italy. She was refloated.
Galoba Petronella	Netherlands	The brigantine struck a sunken wreck and foundered in the bay of Biscay (44°30′N 8°40′W). Her crew survived.
Jacob Horton	United Kingdom	The ship was driven ashore at "Louisville", France. She was on a voyage from Calcutta, India to London. She was refloated and taken in to Cherbourg, Manche, France.
Margaret	United Kingdom	The barque was holed by her anchor and was beached in the Saint Lawrence River. She was on a voyage from West Hartlepool, County Durham to Montreal, Province of Canada, British North America. She was refloated and taken in to Quebec City, Province of Canada for repairs.

== 30 May ==
List of shipwrecks: 30 May 1862
Ship	State	Description
Bravo	United Kingdom	The ship was abandoned in the Atlantic Ocean. She was on a voyage from New York, United States to Dunkirk, Nord, France.
HMS Jason	Royal Navy	The Jason-class corvette ran aground on St. Ann's Shoal off Cape Roxo, Portuguese Guinea. She was on a voyage from Calcutta, India to London. She was refloated and resumed her voyage.

== 31 May ==
List of shipwrecks: 31 May 1862
Ship	State	Description
Caledonia	(United Kingdom of Great Britain and Ireland) British North America	The brig was taken in to "Gloucester, Maine", United States in a derelict condition.
Flora	United Kingdom	The brig ran aground on the Middle Sand, in the North Sea off the coast of Lincolnshire and sank. Her crew were rescued by the smack Mermaid (United Kingdom). Flora was on a voyage from Sunderland, County Durham to Southampton, Hampshire. She was refloated and taken in to Grimsby, Lincolnshire.
Josko B.	Austrian Empire	The brig was wrecked on the Sheringham Shoal, in the North Sea off the coast of Norfolk, United Kingdom. Her fourteen crew were rescued by the brig Meridian (United Kingdom). Josko B. was on a voyage from the River Tyne to Odesa.
Stephen and Elizabeth	United Kingdom	The brig was driven ashore at Corton, Suffolk. She was on a voyage from Sunderland, County Durham to Portsmouth, Hampshire. She was refloated by the tug Powerful (United Kingdom) and towed in to Lowestoft, Suffolk.

== Unknown date ==
List of shipwrecks: Unknown date in May 1862
Ship	State	Description
American Coaster	Confederate States of America	American Civil War: Confederate forces burned the full-rigged ship at Cooke's Island on the Pamunkey River in Virginia between 5 and 10 May.
Barend	Danzig	The ship ran aground on the Ronnebut. She was on a voyage from the River Tyne to Danzig. She was refloated and resumed her voyage, arriving at Danzig on 23 May.
California	Confederate States of America	American Civil War: Confederate forces burned the schooner and sank her as a blockship at Cumberland Landing on the Pamunkey River between 5 and 10 May.
Carldume	Portugal	The steamship sank in the Rio Grande. She was on a voyage from Lisbon to the Rio Grande.
Caroline Baker	Confederate States of America	American Civil War: Confederate forces burned the schooner and sank her as a blockship at Cumberland Landing between 5 and 10 May.
Chicago	United States	The ship was destroyed by fire in the Atlantic Ocean. Her crew survived. She was on a voyage from New York to Acapulco, Mexico.
Claudio	Confederate States of America	American Civil War: Confederate forces scuttled the full-rigged ship as a blockship in the Pamunkey River at White House, Virginia between 5 and 10 May.
Cycloop	Netherlands	The steamship was sunk by ice in the Gulf of Finland. Her crew were rescued by the steamship France (France). Cycloop was on a voyage from Amsterdam, North Holland to Saint Petersburg, Russia.
David Vaname	Confederate States of America	American Civil War: Confederate forces burned the schooner at Cooke's Island between 5 and 10 May.
Diana Hopkins	Confederate States of America	American Civil War: Confederate forces burned the schooner at Cooke's Island between 5 and 10 May.
Director	United Kingdom	The barque was wrecked on the Florida Reefs.
Dove	United Kingdom	The schooner was wrecked on the "Skerry Platters". Her crew were rescued by the tug Universe (United Kingdom).
Earl of Windsor	United Kingdom	The schooner ran aground at Demerara, British Guiana. She was on a voyage from Demerara to London.
Elena	United Kingdom	The ship was driven ashore near Taganrog, Russia.
Elizabeth and Catherine	United Kingdom	The ship foundered. Her crew were rescued by Jura (United Kingdom).
Emelia	United Kingdom	The ship collided with the steamship Hollywood and sank.
Experiment	Confederate States of America	American Civil War: Confederate forces scuttled the schooner at Cooke's Island between 5 and 10 May.
Euphrates	United States	The 587-ton screw steamer was stranded at Sandusky, Ohio.
Friendship	Confederate States of America	American Civil War: Confederate forces scuttled the schooner as a blockship at Cooke's Island between 5 and 10 May.
Hannah Ann	Confederate States of America	American Civil War: Confederate forces scuttled the schooner at Cooke's Island between 5 and 10 May.
Hosta	Danzig	The ship was taken in to Strömstad, Sweden in a waterlogged and derelict condition. She was on a voyage from Danzig to London.
Humility	United Kingdom	The brig was driven ashore on Eartholmen, Denmark and capsized. Her crew were rescued. She was on a voyage from Danzig to London. Humility subsequently floated off and came ashore at Allinge, where she was wrecked.
J & G Fair	Confederate States of America	American Civil War: Confederate forces scuttled the full-rigged ship at Cooke's Landing on the Pamunkey River between 5 and 10 May.
Jenny Lind	Confederate States of America	American Civil War: Confederate forces scuttled the steamer at Garlick's Landing on the Pamunkey River between 5 and 10 May.
CSS Jesup	Confederate States Navy	American Civil War: Confederate forces partially destroyed the gunboat while she was still under construction at Norfolk, to prevent her capture by Union forces. The Union rebuilt her and placed her in United States Army service.
Jordan	United Kingdom	The ship ran aground on the Ak Bourneen Reef, in the Black Sea. She was on a voyage from Malta to Kertch, Russia. She was refloated and taken in to Kertch, where she arrived on 25 May in a severely damaged condition.
Josephine	Confederate States of America	American Civil War: Confederate forces scuttled the schooner as a blockship at Cooke's Island between 6 and 10 May.
J. T. Connor	Confederate States of America	American Civil War: Confederate forces scuttled the full-rigged ship as a blockship at Cooke's Island between 5 and 10 May.
Julie	United Kingdom	The schooner was run into by the steamship Askalon (United Kingdom) and was severely damaged. She was on a voyage from Halifax, Nova Scotia, British North America to Kingston, Jamaica. She was towed in to Kingston by Askalon and sank there.
King William	Confederate States of America	American Civil War: Confederate forces scuttled the full-rigged ship as a blockship at Cooke's Island between 5 and 10 May.
Little Addie	Confederate States of America	American Civil War: Confederate forces scuttle the full-rigged ship in the Pamunkey River near White House, Virginia between 5 and 10 May.
Masaniello	United Kingdom	The full-rigged ship was wrecked on Rodrigues before 26 May. She was on a voyage from Moulmein, Burma to Queenstown, County Cork.
Marmion	United Kingdom	The barque ran aground on the Horseshoe Reef. She was later refloated and taken in to Saint Croix.
Mary Elizabeth	Confederate States of America	American Civil War: Confederate forces destroyed the full-rigged ship in the Pamunkey River at Cooke's Island between 5 and 10 May to prevent her capture by Union forces.
Mary Luyster	Confederate States of America	American Civil War: Confederate forces scuttled the full-rigged ship as a blockship in the Pamunkey River at Cooke's Island between 5 and 10 May.
Napoleon III	France	The ship was wrecked at Maracaibo, Venezuela. She was on a voyage from Marseille, Bouches-du-Rhône to Maracaibo.
Nordstern	Danzig	The ship was driven ashore near Trelleborg, Sweden. She was on a voyage from Danzig to Liverpool, Lancashire, United Kingdom. She was refloated and put in to Copenhagen, Denmark.
Northampton	Confederate States of America	American Civil War: The sidewheel paddle steamer was sunk as a blockship in the James River below Drewry's Bluff, Virginia in mid-May.
Oswego	United Kingdom	The ship was lost whilst on a voyage from Liverpool, Lancashire to Quebec City, Province of Canada, British North America.
Palestine	Confederate States of America	American Civil War: Confederate forces scuttled the schooner in the Pamunkey River at Cooke's Island between 5 and 10 May.
Planter	Confederate States of America	American Civil War: Confederate forces scuttled the full-rigged ship as a blockship in the Pamunkey River at Cooke's Island between 5 and 10 May.
Pole Star	(United Kingdom of Great Britain and Ireland) New Zealand	The schooner was lost with all crew and nine passengers in New Zealand's Bay of Plenty. The ship was carrying shingle between Auckland and Napier, which may have shifted during a gale, causing the ship to capsize. The master of the vessel Planet reported sighting an upturned vessel near White Island on 22 May.
President Smit	Bremen	The ship ran aground at Falmouth, Jamaica. She was refloated the next day.
Princess	Confederate States of America	American Civil War: Confederate forces scuttled the schooner in the Pamunkey River at Cooke's Island between 5 and 10 May.
Queen of England	United Kingdom	The ship rna aground at Newcastle, New South Wales. She was on a voyage from Melbourne, Victoria to Guam. She had been refloated by 21 June and towed in to Sydney, New South Wales for temporary repairs.
Reed	United Kingdom	The ship was lost. She was on a voyage from Sunderland, County Durham to Porto, Portugal.
Reliance	Confederate States of America	American Civil War: Confederate forces burned the full-rigged ship in the Pamunkey River at Indian Town, Virginia between 5 and 10 May.
R. P. Waller	Confederate States of America	American Civil War: Confederate forces scuttled the schooner in the Pamunkey River at Cooke's Island between 5 and 10 May.
Sarah Ann	Confederate States of America	American Civil War: Confederate forces scuttled the schooner at Cooke's Island between 5 and 10 May.
Solide	France	The ship was driven ashore at Praa Sands, Cornwall, United Kingdom. She was on a voyage from Morlaix, Finistère to Llanelly, Glamorgan, United Kingdom.
Stafford	United Kingdom	The ship sprang a leak and was beached at Torekov, Sweden, where she became a wreck.
Star	Confederate States of America	American Civil War: Confederate forces destroyed the full-rigged ship at Garlick's Landing between 5 and 10 May.
Tower Hamlets	United Kingdom	The ship was abandoned at sea. She was on a voyage from Bassein, India to Falmouth, Cornwall.
Way	Confederate States of America	American Civil War: Confederate forces scuttled the schooner at Cumberland, Virginia between 5 and 10 May.
William Edward	Confederate States of America	American Civil War: Confederate forces destroyed the vessel at Cooke's Island between 5 and 10 May.
Unidentified light vessel	Unknown	Wrecked at sea, a light vessel drifted onto a beach at Cape Henry on the coast of Virginia.
Unidentified vessel	Confederate States of America	American Civil War: Confederate forces burned a vessel near Fish Haul on the Pamunkey River between 5 and 10 May.
