= List of shipwrecks in March 1879 =

The list of shipwrecks in March 1879 includes ships sunk, foundered, grounded, or otherwise lost during March 1879.

== 1 March ==
List of shipwrecks: 1 March 1879
Ship	State	Description
Antelope	United Kingdom	The steamship ran aground on the Shipwash Sand, in the North Sea off the coast of Suffolk. She was on a voyage from Newcastle upon Tyne, Northumberland and West Hartlepool, County Durham to Livorno, Italy. She was refloated with the assistance of two smacks and put in to Harwich, Essex.
Fusilier	United Kingdom	The steamship ran aground at Workington, Cumberland.
Rifle	United Kingdom	The smack struck a sunken wreck and foundered off The Lizard, Cornwall. Her crew survived. She was on a voyage from London to Boscastle, Cornwall.

== 2 March ==
List of shipwrecks: 2 March 1879
Ship	State	Description
Admiral	Norway	The barque ran aground 1 nautical mile (1.9 km) south of Life Saving Station No. 5, 6th District, on the coast of North Carolina, United States and was wrecked later in the day when the weather deteriorated. Her fourteen crew were rescued by the United States Life Saving Service. She was on a voyage from Dunkirk, Nord, France to Baltimore, Maryland, United States.
Dundrennan	United Kingdom	The ship was run down and sunk off Lavernock Point, Glamorgan by the steamship Somorrostro (Flag unknown). Her crew were rescued
Holland	Sweden	The schooner was wrecked at Laguna de los Padres, Argentina.
Semplice	Italy	The barque collided with Duchess of Edinburgh (United Kingdom) and foundered in the Atlantic Ocean 150 nautical miles (280 km) north of Cape Finisterre, Spain. Fourteen crew were rescued by Duchess of Edinburgh. Semplice was on a voyage from Bordeaux, Gironde, France to Baltimore, Maryland, United States.

== 3 March ==
List of shipwrecks: 3 March 1879
Ship	State	Description
Auriga	United Kingdom	The ship ran aground on the Lydden Spout, off the coast of Kent. She was on a voyage from Melbourne, Victoria to London. She was refloated and resumed her voyage.
Beltiste	United Kingdom	The barque collided with the steamship Wellesley (United Kingdom) and was abandoned off Dover, Kent. Her crew were rescued. Beltiste was on a voyage from Llanelly, Glamorgan to London. She was subsequently towed in to Dover by Wellesley in a severely damaged condition.
Caesarea	United Kingdom	The steamship ran aground at Bordeaux, Gironde, France.
Carron	United Kingdom	The barque collided with the steamship Bilbao (Spain) and sank off the South Foreland, Kent. Her crew were rescued by Bilbao. Carron was on a voyage from New Orleans, Louisiana, United States to Leith, Lothian.
Choice Fruit	(United Kingdom of Great Britain and Ireland) Guernsey	The ship was abandoned in the Atlantic Ocean. Her crew were rescued by Malleville (United States). Choice Fruit was on a voyage from the Newfoundland Colony to Lisbon, Portugal.
E. A. Barnard	Canada	The barquentine ran aground in thick weather with light snow 1 1/2 nautical miles (2.8 km) north of Life Saving Station No., 5th District, on the Maryland coast. A box of silver plate was brought off. Four of her crew came ashore in the ship's boat and four were rescued by the United States Life Saving Service. She was on a voyage from Livorno, Italy to Philadelphia, Pennsylvania. She was later refloated.
Fraternity	Norway	The schooner ran aground on the Goodwin Sands, Kent. She was on a voyage from Nachez, Mississippi, United States to Kragerø. She was refloated with the assistance of a tug and the Ramsgate Lifeboat and assisted in to Ramsgate, Kent.
Horrox	United Kingdom	The steamship was driven ashore at Havre de Grâce, Seine-Inferieure, France. She was on a voyage from Antwerp, Belgium to the River Plate. She was refloated and resumed her voyage.
Lord Byron	United Kingdom	The steamship ran aground at Hellevoetsluis, Zeeland, Netherlands. She was on a voyage from Barrow-in-Furness, Lancashire to Rotterdam, South Holland, Netherlands.
Peder	Norway	The barque was wrecked on Sanday, Orkney Islands, United Kingdom. She was on a voyage from Kristiansand to Liverpool, Lancashire, United Kingdom.
Ocean Queen	United Kingdom	The ship ran aground on the Goodwin Sands. She was on a voyage from Plymouth, devon to Middlesbrough, Yorkshire. She was refloated with the assistance of a tug.
Pico	United Kingdom	The ship departed from Laguna for Antwerp, Belgium. No further trace, reported overdue.
Robert Kedde, or Robert Kiddey	United Kingdom	The brigantine was wrecked on the Jordan Flats, off the mouth of the River Mersey. Her crew were rescued. She was on a voyage from Bridgwater, Somerset to Liverpool, Lancashire.
Schmidborn	Netherlands	The steamship ran aground in the Nieuwe Waterweg. She was on a voyage from Middlesbrough, Yorkshire, United Kingdom to Rotterdam, South Holland. She was refloated with the assistance of a tug.

== 4 March ==
List of shipwrecks: 4 March 1879
Ship	State	Description
Angelica	United Kingdom	The ship was driven ashore at Burghead, Moray. She was on a voyage from Sunderland, County Durham to the Moray Firth.
Bertha Heyn	Germany	The brigantine went ashore at Rio Grande, Rio Grande do Sul, Brazil. She was on a voyage to there from San Francisco, California, United States. She had broken up by 20 March.
Fairy Queen	United Kingdom	The ship foundered 2 nautical miles (3.7 km) north east of Skeenaghan Point, County Antrim She was on a voyage from Belfast to Rathmullan, County Down.
Janet Forbes	United Kingdom	The barque was driven ashore at Cape Maternillos, Cuba. Her crew survived. She was on a voyage from Cardiff, Glamorgan to Havana, Cuba. Janet Forbes subsequently floated off and drifted out to sea. She was later driven ashore and wrecked in the Cape Verde Islands.
John and Emma	United Kingdom	The smack collided with the steam ketch Hewitt (United Kingdom) and sank off Smith's Knowl, off the north Norfolk coast with the loss of her captain from her five crew. Survivors were rescued by Hewitt.
Mary Ann Jane	United Kingdom	The ship was driven ashore at the Corsethorn Lighthouse, Wigtownshire. She was on a voyage from Dublin to the Isle of Whithorn, Wigtownshire.
South Tyne	United Kingdom	The steamship was driven ashore at Philadelphia, Pennsylvania, United States. She was on a voyage from Philadelphia to Queenstown, County Cork. She was refloated with assistance and resjumed her voyage.

== 5 March ==
List of shipwrecks: 5 March 1879
Ship	State	Description
Ant	United Kingdom	The steamship was driven ashore on Piel Island, Lancashire. She was on a voyage from Liverpool to Barrow-in-Furness.
Cirobina	Spain	The brig collided with the steamship Bengore (United Kingdom) and sank off Cape Finisterre with the loss of six of her crew.
Hochfield	Germany	The steamship ran aground at the entrance to the Nieuwe Waterweg. She was on a voyage from Bilbao, Spain to Rotterdam, South Holland, Netherlands.

== 6 March ==
List of shipwrecks: 6 March 1879
Ship	State	Description
Crown	United Kingdom	The barque was driven ashore and wrecked on Vlieland, Friesland, Netherlands. Her crew were rescued. She was on a voyage from Pensacola, Florida to Harlingen, Friesland.
Mary Helena	United States	The schooner sprung a leak and was beached to prevent sinking two miles (3.2 km) north of Life Saving Station No. 13, 4th District, on the New Jersey coast and was wrecked. Her crew of two and one passenger made it to shore on their own. She was stripped and abandoned.
Schmidborn	United Kingdom	The steamship ran aground at Rotterdam, South Holland, Netherlands.

== 7 March ==
List of shipwrecks: 7 March 1879
Ship	State	Description
Acton	United States	The ship was driven ashore at New York. She was on a voyage from Havana, Cuba to New York. She was refloated.
Guy Mannering	United Kingdom	The steamship collided with the steamship Brazilian (United Kingdom) in the River Mersey and was damaged. Guy Mannering was on a voyage from Liverpool, Lancashire to Philadelphia, Pennsylvania, United States. She was taken in to Birkenhead, Cheshire.
Stephanotis	United Kingdom	The steamship ran aground off Stettin, Germany. She was on a voyage from Newcastle upon Tyne, Northumberland to Stettin. She was refloated the next day and taken in to Stettin in a leaky condition.
Turkish Empire	United Kingdom	The full-rigged ship was driven ashore and wrecked on Big Duck Island, New Brunswick, Canada with the loss of eight of her 23 crew. She was on a voyage from St. John, New Brunswick to Dublin.

== 8 March ==
List of shipwrecks: 8 March 1879
Ship	State	Description
Countess of Dublin	United Kingdom	The ship ran aground at Dublin. She was on a voyage from Dublin to Portsmouth, Hampshire. She was later refloated and resumed her voyage.
Harmonie	Netherlands	The galiot foundered in the North Sea 12 nautical miles (22 km) south east by east of Spurn Point, Yorkshire, United Kingdom. Her crew were rescued by the smack Milburn (United Kingdom). Harmonie was on a voyage from Middlesbrough, Yorkshire to Brixham, Devon, United Kingdom.
Loch Linnhe	United Kingdom	The ship ran aground on the Briggs, off the coast of County Down. She was on a voyage from Glasgow, Renfrewshire to Melbourne, Victoria. She was refloated.
May Queen	United Kingdom	The barque was beached in the River Severn 2 nautical miles (3.7 km) downstream of Sharpness, Gloucestershire. She was on a voyage from New York, United States to Sharpness. She was refloated and taken in to Sharpness.
Quarryman	United Kingdom	The schooner ran aground at the mouth of the River Tay. She was refloated and towed in to Dundee, Forfarshire.
Unnamed	United Kingdom	The barge was run into by the steamship Gilston (United Kingdom) and sank in the River Thames at Woolwich, Kent.

== 9 March ==
List of shipwrecks: 9 March 1879
Ship	State	Description
Hattie Goudey	Canada	The barque ran aground and sank off Honfleur, Manche, France with the loss of three of her crew. She was on a voyage from Philadelphia, Pennsylvania, United States to Rouen, Seine-Inférieure, France.
Marian Moore	United Kingdom	The barque was driven ashore and wrecked at Ras al Hadd, Muscat and Oman. Her 36 crew were rescued. She was on a voyage from Calcutta, India to Muscat. The ship was plundered by the local Arabs.
Rajah	United Kingdom	The ship ran into the pier at Calais, France and was severely damaged. She was towed to a British port by the tugboat Wrestler (United Kingdom).

== 10 March ==
List of shipwrecks: 10 March 1879
Ship	State	Description
Bonnie Dundee	New South Wales	The steamship was cut in two in a collision with the steamship Barrabool (flag unknown) and sank with the loss of five lives at 33°06.327′S 151°42.258′E, about 5 kilometres (2.7 nmi; 3.1 mi) off Caves Beach, New South Wales, Australia. Barrabool suffered a gash in her bow but remained afloat.
Constance Ellen	United Kingdom	The brigantine was driven ashore at Dungeness, Kent. She was on a voyage from Antwerp, Belgium to the Rio Grande.
Forget-me-not	China	The barque was driven ashore and wrecked at Yantai (Chefoo).
Geelong	New Zealand	The steamship stranded and broke up close to the mouth of the Hokianga Harbour, New Zealand, with the loss of two passengers.
Moderator	United Kingdom	The smack ran aground in the River Camel, capsized and sank. She was on a voyage from Newport, Monmouthshire to Wadebridge, Cornwall.
Nelson	United Kingdom	The brig ran aground on the Gunfleet Sand, in the North Sea off the coast of Essex, and sank. Her crew were rescued. She was on a voyage from London to Seaham, County Durham.
Polixene	Austria-Hungary	The brig was driven ashore at Pitimbu, Brazil. She was on a voyage from Antwerp to Porto Alegre, Brazil.
Quarryman	United Kingdom	The schooner ran aground at Dundee, Forfarshire. She was refloated.
Sarah Amy	United Kingdom	The ship ran aground on the Goodwin Sands, Kent. She was on a voyage from Seaham, County Durham to Portsmouth, Hampshire. She was refloated and resumed her voyage.
HMS Thetis	Royal Navy	The Briton-class corvette was damaged by fire at Keyham, Devon.

== 11 March ==
List of shipwrecks: 11 March 1879
Ship	State	Description
Eleanor Thomas	United Kingdom	The schooner ran aground at Ballyness, County Donegal. She was on a voyage from Ballyness to London. She was refloated and resumed her voyage, but put in to Londonderry in a leaky condition.
Sodskene	Norway	The ship ran aground near Ystad, Sweden She was on a voyage from West Hartlepool, County Durham, United Kingdom to Ystad. She was refloated and found to be severely leaky.

== 12 March ==
List of shipwrecks: 12 March 1879
Ship	State	Description
Ben Avon	United Kingdom	The steamship ran aground at Saltholm, Denmark. She was on a voyage from Newcastle upon Tyne, Northumberland to Danzig, Germany. She was refloated and towed in to Copenhagen, Denmark. for repairs
Good Intent	United Kingdom	The fishing boat was run down and sunk off Eyemouth, Berwickshire with the loss of two of her crew.
Hawendale	United Kingdom	The ship was driven ashore and wrecked at the Trwyn Du Lighthouse. Her crew were rescued by a pilot boat. She was on a voyage from Barrow-in-Furness, Lancashire to Llanelly, Glamorgan.
J. H. Lorentzen	United Kingdom	The steamship was wrecked at Whitby, Yorkshire. Her seventeen crew were rescued by the Whitby Lifeboat.
Otterburn	United Kingdom	The brig was driven ashore at "Collier Hope", Yorkshire. She was later refloated.
Unnamed	United Kingdom	A fishing smack was driven ashore and wrecked at Spurn Point, Yorkshire with the loss of all five crew.

== 13 March ==
List of shipwrecks: 13 March 1879
Ship	State	Description
Alford	United Kingdom	The steamship ran aground in the River Thames at Gravesend, Kent. She was on a voyage from London to Calais, France.
Bien	Denmark	The schooner was driven ashore in Aalbek Bay. She was on a voyage from Aarhus to London. She was refloated and taken in to Fredrikshavn in a leaky conditioin.
Dunrobin Castle	United Kingdom	The schooner struck a sunken rock off Ardmore Head, Islay and sank. Her crew were rescued. She was Glasgow, Renfrewshire to "Atromness".
Henry Fisher	United Kingdom	The steamship was driven ashore on "Vensholmen", near Nakskov, Denmark.
Richard Raper	United Kingdom	The schooner was driven ashore and wrecked at Peterhead, Aberdeenshire. Her crew survived. She was on a voyage from Newcastle upon Tyne, Northumberland to Thurso, Caithness.
Unnamed	United Kingdom	A fishing boat was driven ashore and wrecked at Peterhead. Her five crew were rescued.

== 14 March ==
List of shipwrecks: 14 March 1879
Ship	State	Description
Edinburgh	Trinity House	The pilot cutter was run into about 12:30 a.m. by the steamship RMS Severn (United Kingdom) and sank 2 nautical miles (3.7 km) south of Dungeness lighthouse, with the loss of ten pilots and five of the cutter's crew. Five crew were rescued by Severn.
Koning der Nederlanden	Netherlands	The steamship caught fire in the Nieuwe Diep.
Luxor	United Kingdom	The steamship put in to The Downs on fire. She was on a voyage from Garrucha, Spain to London. She resumed her voyage with a pilot.

== 15 March ==
List of shipwrecks: 15 March 1879
Ship	State	Description
Unnamed	Flag unknown	A derelict barque was reported by Eboe (Flag unknown) at 48°00′N 8°50′W.

== 16 March ==
List of shipwrecks: 16 March 1879
Ship	State	Description
Armande	Flag unknown	The schooner was driven ashore at Lindisfarne, Northumberland, United Kingdom. Her crew were rescued.

== 17 March ==
List of shipwrecks: 17 March 1879
Ship	State	Description
Familiens Haab	Denmark	The brigantine ran aground on Albu Triller reef, off the west coast of Lolland on a voyage from Hartlepool, County Durham, United Kingdom to Rostock, Germany. She was refloated and later arrived at Warnemünde, Rostock.
Yesso	United Kingdom	The steam ship was on a voyage from Shantou (Swatow) to Xiamen (Amoy) and was wrecked in the White Rocks off Lamock Islands. Master Captain Samuel Ashton. 153 passengers were saved."The Loss of the Yesso". Shipping and Mercantile Gazette. 20 May 1879. p. 7.

== 18 March ==
List of shipwrecks: 18 March 1879
Ship	State	Description
Albert Edward	United Kingdom	The ship departed from South Shields, County Durham for Savona, Italy. Presumed foundered in the North Sea with the loss of all hands. Wreckage from the ship washed up at Wrangle, Lincolnshire on 25 March and at Skegness on 27 March.
Amethyst	United Kingdom	The steamer went ashore on Lady Isle, in the Firth of Clyde, in thick fog, on a coastal voyage from Glasgow to Ayr, Scotland. She was refloated on the following day and continued her voyage.
Australian	United Kingdom	The steamship ran aground in the South Pass. She was on a vohyage from New Orleans, Louisiana, United States to Liverpool, Lancashire. She was refloated and resumed her voyage.
Manfred	Western Australia	The ship was wrecked in the Lacepede Islands.
Marienburg	Germany	The steamship foundered in "the Sleeve". Her crew were rescued by the steamship Blonde (Germany). Marienburg was on a voyage from Danzig to Antwerp, Belgium.
Runnymede	Western Australia	The ship was wrecked in the Lacepede Islands.
Sir Charles Napier	United Kingdom	The ship was wrecked on Ascension Island. She was on a voyage from Hong Kong to London.
Sulina	Western Australia	The ship was wrecked in the Lacepede Islands.
Wide Awake	United States	The schooner was driven ashore near Chebogue, Nova Scotia, Canada. She was on a voyage from Antigua to Yarmouth, Nova Scotia. She was refloated and towed in to Yarmouth.

== 19 March ==
List of shipwrecks: 19 March 1879
Ship	State	Description
Arrogante	French Navy	The Arrogante-class ironclad sank at Hyères, Var with the loss of 38 of her 122 crew. She was refloated in May.
Bangor	United Kingdom	The ship ran aground on the Chauseé de Sein. She was on a voyage from Réunion to Bordeaux, Gironde, France. She put in to Brest, Finistère, France in a sinking condition.
Bay City	United States	The barge, abandoned a few days earlier, was sunk by ice one-quarter mile (0.40 km) from the Marblehead Light in Lake Erie in six feet (1.8 m) of water, a total loss.
Garonne	United Kingdom	The steamship ran aground on the Tapley Shoal, off Adelaide, South Australia. She was on a voyage from Adelaide to an English port. She was refloated on 21 March and resumed her voyage.
Happy Return	United Kingdom	The sloop was wrecked at Port Eynon Point, Glamorgan. She was on a voyage from Swansea, Glamorgan to Carmarthen.
Robert Pow	United Kingdom	The paddle tug was wrecked at Souter Point, Northumberland. Her crew survived.
Saint Michel	Haitian Navy|Haitian Navy	The gunboat collided with the steamship Bolivar (United Kingdom) and foundered 5 nautical miles (9.3 km) off Gonaïves with the loss of 108 lives. Seventy-two people were rescued by Bolivar.
Yesso	Hong Kong	The steamship was wrecked on the Lammock, 20 nautical miles (37 km) south east of Shantou (Swatow), China. Some of her passengers and crew were rescued by Gaelic (United Kingdom).

== 20 March ==
List of shipwrecks: 20 March 1879
Ship	State	Description
Ann Law	United Kingdom	The brig was driven ashore at North Berwick, Lothian. She was on a voyage from Aberdeen to Leith, Lothian. She was refloated with the assistance of a tug and resumed her voyage.
Ardanach	United Kingdom	The steamship was driven ashore between Lavernock and Sully, Glamorgan. She was on a voyage from Cardiff, Glamorgan to Dieppe, Seine-Inférieure, France. She was refloated, and resumed her voyage the next day.
Ardenica	United Kingdom	The ship caught fire at New Orleans, Louisiana, United States. She was on a voyage from New Orleans to Liverpool, Lancashire.
China	United Kingdom	The ship was wrecked at the mouth of the Mat, Réunion in a cyclone.
Clan Alpine	United Kingdom	The steamship was driven ashore and wrecked at Goat Point, Lothian. She was on a voyage from Montrose, Forfarshire to Campbeltown, Argyllshire.
Clara	United Kingdom	The Thames barge ran into the steamship Manila (Italy) and sank in the River Thames at Greenhithe, Kent.
Cynthia	New Zealand	The schooner went ashore in fog to the south of Ross, New Zealand, while en route from Wanganui to Greymouth. All hands were saved.
Darlington	United Kingdom	The steamship was wrecked near Lindisfarne, Northumberland. Her nine crew were rescued by the Lindisfarne Lifeboat Grace Darling ( Royal National Lifeboat Institution). Darlington was on a voyage from Dundee, Forfarshire to Middlesbrough, Yorkshire.
Denmore	United Kingdom	The steamship ran aground and sank at the Isle of May. Her twelve crew took to two boats; they were rescued by the steamship Princess Alice (United Kingdom). Dunmore was on a voyage from Leith to Aberdeen.
Gambia, and Spero	United Kingdom	The steamships collided off Scarborough, Yorkshire and were both severely damaged. They put in to the River Tyne. Gambia was on a voyage from London to Dundee. Spero was on a voyage from the River Tyne to London.
George	United Kingdom	The brigantine was driven ashore and wrecked 2 miles (3.2 km) north of Staithes, Yorkshire. Her six crew survived.
Gloria	Italy	The ship foundered in the Indian Ocean in a cyclone. Her crew were rescued by Margaret Wilkie (United Kingdom).
Minero	Chile	The barque was beached at Valparaíso. She was refloated on 17 April.
Norine	United Kingdom	The ship was abandoned at sea. She was on a voyage from Agrigento, Sicily, Italy to Porto, Portugal.
Rap	Norway	The schooner was driven ashore and severely damaged 2 nautical miles (3.7 km) north of Fifeness, Fife, United Kingdom. Her crew survived. She was on a voyage from Berwick upon Tweed, Northumberland to Dunbar, Lothian.
Revival	United Kingdom	The schooner was abandoned in the Indian Ocean in a cyclone. Her crew were rescued by Gloria (Austria-Hungary). She was subsequently taken in to Tamatave, Merina Kingdom.
Unity	New Zealand	The ketch was driven onto rocks and broke up at Cape Campbell, New Zealand, while en route from Lyttelton Harbour to Wellington. All hands were saved.

== 21 March ==
List of shipwrecks: 21 March 1879
Ship	State	Description
City of Paris	United Kingdom	The steamship struck the Roman Rock, off Simon's Town, Cape Colony and was damaged. Her passengers were taken off by HMS Tamar (Royal Navy). City of Paris was on a voyage from Queenstown, County Cork to Simon's Town. She was refloated and taken in to Simon's Town.
Levier	France	The brig ran aground off St Martin's, Isles of Scilly, United Kingdom. She was on a voyage from Cardiff, Glamorgan, United Kingdom to Saint-Malo, Ille-et-Vilaine. She was refloated.
Maximos	France	The barque was severely damaged in a cyclone at Réunion.
Rob Roy	United Kingdom	The steam lighter struck the wreck of Carrick Castle (United Kingdom) and was beached at Connel, Argyllshire. Her crew survived.
Salasie	France	The barque was severely damaged in a cyclone at Réunion.
Snowdrop	United Kingdom	The steamship ran aground at "Corsuelles", France. She was on a voyage from Newport, Monmouthshire to Rouen, Seine-Inférieure, France. She was refloated.
Strasburg	Germany	The steam barge sank off Holyhead, Anglesey, United Kingdom. She was being towed from Liverpool, Lancashire, United Kingdom to Rotterdam, South Holland, Netherlands by the tug Fury (United Kingdom). She was refloated on 2 April and beached.
Warwick Castle	United Kingdom	The ship ran aground on the Haisborough Sands, in the North Sea off the coast of Norfolk. She was on a voyage from Dundee, Forfarshire to Calcutta, India. She was refloated with assistance from the tug Dreadnought (United Kingdom) and taken in tow for London.

== 22 March ==
List of shipwrecks: 22 March 1879
Ship	State	Description
Homeward Bound	United States	The barque stranded in thick weather 1 nautical mile (1.9 km) north of Life Saving Station No. 8, 4th District on the New Jersey coast and was wrecked. Her eleven crew were rescued by the United States Life Saving Service. She was on a voyage from Amsterdam, North Holland, Netherlands to New York.
Riccardo A. Puccio	United Kingdom	The barque was run down and sunk by a steamship off Gibraltar with the loss of two lives. She was on a voyage from Huanillos, Chile to Gibraltar.
Unnamed	United Kingdom	A barque was driven ashore at New Romney, Kent.

== 23 March ==
List of shipwrecks: 23 March 1879
Ship	State	Description
Alaska	United States	Bound for Ahnapee, Wisconsin, in ballast, the 89.6-foot (27.3 m), 85.14-gross register ton two-masted scow schooner was blown ashore during a gale on Lake Michigan near Two Rivers, Wisconsin, north of Twin River Point Light. Her crew survived, but she could not be refloated, was abandoned where she was stranded, and later sank nearby. Her wreck, discovered in May 2014, lies in 5 feet (1.5 m) of water at the southern end of Point Beach State Forest at 44°11.607′N 087°30.677′W and is partially covered by sand. It is within the boundaries of the Wisconsin Shipwreck Coast National Marine Sanctuary.
City of Paris	United Kingdom	Anglo-Zulu War: The steamship ran aground in Simon's Bay, Southern Africa. She was carrying British Army troops who were rescued by HMS Tamar.
Nile	United Kingdom	The steamship was driven ashore on Ischia, Italy. She was on a voyage from Newport, Monmouthshire to Naples, Italy.
Reliance	United Kingdom	The fishing smack was wrecked at Spurn Point, Yorkshire. Her eleven crew were rescued by the Spurn Lifeboat.
Rosa Schneider	United Kingdom	The schooner departed from the Bull River, Georgia, United States for Queenstown, County Cork. No further trace, presumed foundered with the loss of all eight hands.
Ocean Drift	United Kingdom	The brig struck a sunken rock. She was on a voyage from Blyth, Northumberland to Oran, Algeria. She put in to Vigo, Spain in a leaky condition.
Tabasco	France	The schooner was wrecked on White Islands, Isles of Scilly, United Kingdom. Her crew were rescued. She was on a voyage from Glasgow, Renfrewshire, United Kingdom to Bordeaux, Gironde.
Venus	United Kingdom	The sloop was abandoned in the Bristol Channel. Her crew were rescued. She was on a voyage from Bridgwater, Somerset to Milford Haven, Pembrokeshire. She was towed in to Minehead, Somerset.
William	United Kingdom	The schooner was driven ashore at Lowestoft, Suffolk. Her crew were rescued.

== 24 March ==
List of shipwrecks: 24 March 1879
Ship	State	Description
Adele Ollillie	Germany	The ship was driven ashore on Terschelling, Friesland, Netherlands. She was on a voyage from Hamburg to London, United Kingdom.
Amboto	United Kingdom	The steamship ran aground and was wrecked on the Cadda Rocks, off Galle, Ceylon. She was on a voyage from Rangoon, Burma to an English port.
Amil	United Kingdom	The brigantine was driven ashore at West Hartlepool, County Durham. She was on a voyage from Seaham, County Durham to Colchester, Essex.
Amulet	United Kingdom	The steamship ran aground at Maassluis, South Holland, Netherlands. She was on a voyage from Leith, Lothian to Rotterdam, South Holland. She was refloated with the assistance of tugs.
Ann	United Kingdom	The schooner was driven ashore and wrecked at Hartlepool, County Durham. Her six crew were rescued by the Hartlepool Lifeboat John Clay Barlow ( Royal National Lifeboat Institution). She was on a voyage from Hartlepool to Colchester, Essex.
Grangemouth	United Kingdom	The steamship ran aground in the Maas. She was on a voyage from Grangemouth, Stirlingshire to Rotterdam. She was refloated with the assistance of tugs.
Tabasco	France	The schooner, carrying coal from Greenock to Bordeaux, struck White Island, St Martin's, Isles of Scilly. Her master mistook the Sevenstones Lightship for Trevose Head on the north Cornish shore. She was on her maiden voyage and the vessel and cargo are a total loss. All the crew survived.
No. 68	United Kingdom	The pilot boat was driven ashore at Breaksea Point, Glamorgan.

== 25 March ==
List of shipwrecks: 25 March 1879
Ship	State	Description
Alnwick Castle	United Kingdom	The steamship caught fire at Bombay, India. The fire was extinguished.
Averill	United Kingdom	The steamship ran aground at West Hartlepool, County Durham. She was on a voyage from Boston, Massachusetts, United States to West Hartlepool. She was refloated with the assistance of four tugs.
Cato	Norway	The brig was wrecked on the Haisborough Sands, in the North Sea off the coast of Norfolk, United Kingdom. Her eight crew were rescued by the Caister Lifeboat Covent Garden ( Royal National Lifeboat Institution). Cato was on a voyage from Arendal to Calais, France.
Diamaten	Norway	The brig was driven ashore and wrecked between Crail and Anstruther, Fife, United Kingdom with the loss of all but one of the four crew aboard. The survivor was rescued by the Anstruther Lifeboat.
Elaine	Norway	The barque ran aground on the Swin Middle Sand, in the Thames Estuary She floated off and was wrecked on the Barrow Sand. Her crew were rescued by a steamship.
Friends	United Kingdom	The ship ran aground on the North Bull, in the Irish Sea and was beached at Drogheda, County Louth. She was on a voyage from Workington, Cumberland to Drogheda.
Lady Bird	United Kingdom	The ship was damaged by fire at Rangoon, Burma.
Ladyland	United Kingdom	The ship sank at Newport, Monmouthshire.
Lina	Norway	The barque was wrecked on the Galloper Sand with the loss of one of the ten people on board. Survivors were rescued by the tug Aid (United Kingdom) and the Ramsgate Lifeboat Bradford ( Royal National Lifeboat Institution). Lina was on a voyage from Porsgrund to London, United Kingdom.
Seaton	United Kingdom	The ship was driven ashore near "Vikenis", Germany. She had been refloated by 27 March.
Tulcan	United Kingdom	The barque capsized and sank in the Delaware River. Her crew were rescued.

== 26 March ==
List of shipwrecks: 26 March 1879
Ship	State	Description
Duart Bay	United Kingdom	The ship was run into by the steam tender Ajax (New South Wales) at Newcastle, New South Wales and was severely damaged. She was on a voyage from Newcastle to Madras, India. She was taken in to Newcastle for repairs.
Ellen J. McKinnon	United States	The 69.84-gross register ton trading schooner rolled onto her side and became waterlogged during a storm in the North Pacific Ocean six days into a trading voyage from San Francisco, California, to Unalaska in the Aleutian Islands and the Arctic with a crew of 10 men and 100 tons of merchandise aboard. The vessel Otago (United States) found her wreck on 21 April drifting 500 nautical miles (930 km; 580 mi) northwest of San Francisco at 42°14′00″N 129°37′10″W with only one crewman left alive.

== 27 March ==
List of shipwrecks: 27 March 1879
Ship	State	Description
Olga	United Kingdom	The steamship struck the pier and sank at Sulina, United Principalities. She was on a voyage from Liverpool, Lancashire to Sulina. Olga was refloated on 26 May and taken in to Sulina. She was consequently condemned.
Unnamed	Flag unknown	A brig was seen to keel over and sink on Hasborough Sands off the coast of Norfolk, United Kingdom, by a Great Yarmouth fishing boat.

== 28 March ==
List of shipwrecks: 28 March 1879
Ship	State	Description
Fury	United Kingdom	The paddle tug sank at North Shields, Northumberland. She was refloated.
Hankow	United Kingdom	The steamship ran aground in the Suez Canal. She was on a voyage from London to Shanghai, China. She was later refloated and resumed her voyage.
Helena	United Kingdom	The steamship ran aground at Kertch, Russia. She was refloated on 30 March.

== 29 March ==
List of shipwrecks: 29 March 1879
Ship	State	Description
Angelique	France	The lugger was driven ashore near Llanelly, Glamorgan, United Kingdom. She was on a voyage from Port-Launay, Finistère to Llanelly.
Bernina	United Kingdom	The steamship departed from New York, United States for Bristol, Gloucestershire. No further trace, presumed foundered with the loss of all hands.
Cydonia	United Kingdom	The steamship was driven ashore at Ras Matbakh, Basra Vilayet. She was on a voyage from Rangoon, Burka to a British port.
Dina Andriana	Netherlands	The galiot was driven ashore and wrecked at Bradwell Point, Northumberland, United Kingdom.
Elizabeth Kilner	United Kingdom	The schooner ran aground on the Boulder Bank, in the Solent. She was on a voyage from London to Dublin. She was refloated the next day and put in to Cowes, Isle of Wight in a leaky condition.
Moonlight	United Kingdom	The steamship foundered off Ardrossan, Ayrshire. Her three crew survived. She was on a voyage from Ardrossan to Fairlie, Ayrshire.
Nordmaling	Sweden	The barque was wrecked on Grand Bahama, Bahamas. Her crew were rescued. She was on a voyage from Galveston, Texas, United States to Liverpool, Lancashire, United Kingdom.
Ornen	Sweden	The ship was driven ashore at Antwerp, Belgium. She was on a voyage from Pabellón de Pica, Chile to Antwerp.
Otter	United Kingdom	The steamship was driven ashore at Spittal Point, Northumberland. She was on a voyage from Berwick upon Tweed, Northumberland to London. She was refloated with the assistance of the paddle tug Tweed (United Kingdom) and put back to Berwick upon Tweed.
Venus	United Kingdom	The lugger was driven ashore and wrecked west of the Dungeness Lighthouse, Kent.

== 30 March ==
List of shipwrecks: 30 March 1879
Ship	State	Description
Canopus	United Kingdom	The steamship ran aground at Boston, Massachusetts, United States. She was on a voyage from Boston to Liverpool, Lancashire.
Carl	Sweden	The schooner was driven ashore and wrecked at Cambois, Northumberland, United Kingdom. She was on a voyage from Halmstad to Newcastle upon Tyne, Northumberland.
Maria	France	The schooner was run into by the steamship Miranda (United Kingdom) and sank in the English Channel with the loss of five of her crew.
Unnamed	Italy	A ship capsized in a squall in the Mediterranean Sea (37°20′N 12°06′E) with the loss of four of her six crew. Survivors were rescued by the barque Martino Maria (United Kingdom).

== 31 March ==
List of shipwrecks: 31 March 1879
Ship	State	Description
Dafila	United Kingdom	The steamship was wrecked at Lemvig, Denmark. She was on a voyage from Sunderland, County Durham to Gothenburg, Sweden.
Fides	United Kingdom	The brig ran aground on the Leigh Middle Sand, in the Thames Estuary. She was on a voyage from Demerara, British Guiana to London.
Henrietta Burchard	Germany	The ship was driven ashore and wrecked at Anjer, Netherlands East Indies. She was on a voyage from Batavia to Padang, Netherlands East Indies and an American port.
James M. Vance	United States	The schooner stranded in a gale and heavy seas 2 3/4 miles (4.4 km) north of the Cape Henry Life Saving Station No. 1, 6th District on the North Carolina coast and was wrecked. Her crew of six was rescued by the United States Life Saving Service.
Margaretha	Germany	The schooner was driven ashore and wrecked at "Tuya", Argentina.
Norina	Austria-Hungary	The sailing ship sprung a leak off of Florida and stranded ten miles (16 km) north of Life Saving Station No. 2, 7th District on the Florida coast, one-quarter mile (0.40 km) offshore, a total loss of vessel and cargo. Her crew of 13 made it to shore in the ship's boat.

== Unknown date ==
List of shipwrecks: Unknown date in March 1879
Ship	State	Description
Benclutha	United Kingdom	The barque ran aground and was wrecked at Yantai (Chefoo), China. She was on a voyage from Shanghai to Yantai and Hong Kong. She was consequently condemned.
Betty	United Kingdom	The schooner was run into by the paddle steamer Eblana (United Kingdom (United Kingdom) off Whitehead, County Antrim and was abandoned. Her crew were rescued by Eblana. Betty came ashore at Whitehead.
Brown	United Kingdom	The barque was driven ashore and wrecked on Vlieland, Friesland, Netherlands. Her crew were rescued. She was on a voyage from Pensacola, Florida, United States to Harlingen, Friesland.
Cadet	Germany	The schooner sprang a leak and was abandoned in the Atlantic Ocean (50°50′N 6°10′W) before 29 March. Her crew were rescued by the schooner Weasel ( (United Kingdom of Great Britain and Ireland) Jersey). Cadet was on a voyage from Hamburg to Liverpool, Lancashire, United Kingdom.
Champion	United States	The ship was driven ashore at Chincoteague, Virginia. She was on a voyage from Dunkirk, Nord, France to Philadelphia, Pennsylvania.
City of Limerick	United Kingdom	The steamship ran aground at New Orleans, Louisiana, United States. She was on a voyage from New Orleans to Liverpool. She was refloated and resumed her voyage. She was refloated on 4 March.
Crab	Belgium	The fishing trawler was run down and sunk off Lowestoft, Suffolk, United Kingdom by the steamship Ceres (United Kingdom). Her crew were rescued. Also reported as sunk off Smith's Knowl, Norfolk, United Kingdom.
David Brown	United States	The ship caught fire at Charleston, South Carolina and was scuttled. She was on avoyage from Charleston to Havre de Grâce, Seine-Inférieure, France.
David Malcolmson	United Kingdom	The ship an aground at New Orleans. She was on a voyage from New Orleans to Liverpool. She was refloated and put back to New Orleans in a leaky condition.
Dinas	United Kingdom	The steamship ran aground at Bilbao, Spain and was wrecked. Her crew survived. She was on a voyage from Cardiff, Glamorgan to Bilbao.
Elizabeth Hamilton	United States	The ship was abandoned. Her crew were rescued by the steamship Lykus (United Kingdom). Elizabeth Hamilton was on a voyage from Philadelphia to Trieste. Her mate was subsequently arrested on a charge of scuttling the ship.
Emma Eliza	United Kingdom	The ketch was driven ashore at Wells-next-the-Sea, Norfolk. She was on a voyage from Goole, Yorkshire to Blakeney, Norfolk. She was refloated and taken in to Blakeney in a leaky condition.
England's Glory	United Kingdom	The fishing boat was driven ashore and wrecked 5 1/2 nautical miles (10.2 km) south of Robin Hoods Bay, Yorkshire. Her crew were rescued.
Eunice	United Kingdom	The steamship ran aground at Sunderland, County Durham. She was refloated and put back to Sunderland.
Fanny B. Tucker	United States	The ship ank in the Schuylkill River. Her crew survived. She was on a voyage from Havana, Cuba to Philadelphia.
Fidelia	Germany	The barque was lost off Shandong (Shantung), China.
Flora Kelso	United Kingdom	The schooner ran aground at Campbeltown, Argyllshire. She was on a voyage from Ardrossan, Ayrshire to Newry, County Antrim.
Fury	United Kingdom	The tug sank at North Shields, Northumberland. She was later refloated.
Hetty	United Kingdom	The steamship ran aground at Copenhagen, Denmark before 18 March. She was on a voyage from Ystad, Sweden to Copenhagen. She had been refloated by 19 March and taken in to Copenhagen.
Irene	United Kingdom	The brigantine was wrecked at Maranhão, Brazil. Her crew were rescued. SHe was on a voyage from Cardiff to Maranhão.
Iris	United Kingdom	The ship was driven ashore and wrecked on Alderney, Channel Islands. She was on a voyage from Rotterdam, South Holland, Netherlands to Saint-Malo, Ille-et-Vilaine, France.
Jacob Roggeveen	Netherlands	The ship was driven ashore at Probolinggo, Netherlands East Indies. She was on a voyage from Java, Netherlands East Indies to a Dutch port.
L'Avvenire	Italy	The ship was abandoned in the Atlantic Ocean. She was on a voyage from Messina, Sicily to New York, United States. She was discovered on 24 March by the barque Black Prince, which put some of her crew aboard. They took Avvenire in to Bermuda.
Lina	United Kingdom	The barque was wrecked off the coast of Essex. Her crew got aboard the Swin Middle Lightship ( Trinity House), from where they were rescued by a steamship.
Lord Lyon	United Kingdom	The ship was driven ashore and wrecked at Roquetas, Spain before 5 March.
Lovaine	United Kingdom	The steamship ran aground at North Shields. She was on a voyage from Baltimore, Maryland, United States to North Shields. She was refloated.
Luedna Durkee	Canada	The ship was abandoned off the Delaware Breakwater. Her crew were rescued. She was on a voyage from New York to Bordeaux, Gironde, France.
Mactan	(Spain) Spanish East Indies	The steamship was wrecked on a reef off "Tulanan Island" with the loss of eight lives. She was on a voyage from Manila to Yloilo.
Margaret	United Kingdom	The brig was driven ashore near Almería, Spain. She subsequently became a wreck.
Mathilde	Cape Colony	The brigantine was driven ashore at Port Beaufort. She was on a voyage from Swansea, Glamorgan to Table Bay.
Methuselah	France	The barque was driven ashore at the Rammekens Castle, Zeeland, Netherlands. She was on a voyage from Antwerp, Belgium to Pensacola, Florida.
Mikado	United Kingdom	The steamship ran aground at New Orleans. She was on a voyage from New Orleans to Liverpool. She was refloated.
O Thyen	Germany	The ship was abandoned in the Atlantic Ocean. Her crew were rescued. She was on a voyage from Baltimore to Bremen.
Otterburn	United Kingdom	The ship was driven ashore at Port Glasgow, Renfrewshire. She was on a voyage from Glasgow, Renfrewshire to Rio de Janeiro, Brazil.
Padang Packet	Germany	The ship was wrecked on the Arenas Cay, Cuba.
Paquerette	France	The ship was driven ashore near Dénia, Spain. She was on a voyage from Marseille, Bouches-du-Rhône, France to Mexico. She was refloated in mid-June.
Penero	(flag) France	The brigantine ran aground and capsized in the Vilaine. She was on a voyage from Redon, Ille-et-Vilaine to Cardiff.
Prince Carl	Norway	The brig was driven ashore 6 nautical miles (11 km) south of Warkworth, Northumberland. She was refloated with assistance from the tug Pactolus (United Kingdom and taken in to North Shields.
Queen of the South	United Kingdom	The ship was wrecked on the coast of Mexico. Her crew survived.
Richard Roper	United Kingdom	The schooner was driven ashore and wrecked at "Port Henry". She was on a voyage from Newcastle upon Tyne, Northumberland to Thurso, Caithness.
Robert Bright	United Kingdom	The barque was abandoned in the Atlantic Ocean before 4 March. Her crew were rescued. She was on a voyage from Liverpool to Bahia, Brazil.
Suliote	United Kingdom	The ship caught fire at New Orleans.
Suez	United Kingdom	The steamship was run into at the entrance to the West India Docks, London by Florence United Kingdom and was severely damaged. She was on a voyage from Colombo, Ceylon to London.
Sunbeam	United Kingdom	The barque was driven ashore at Darien, Georgia, United States. She was on a voyage from Liverpool to Doboy, Georgia.
Ten Brothers and Sisters	United Kingdom	The ship ran aground near Ystad, Sweden. She was refloated and found to be severely leaky.
Viceadmiraal May	Netherlands	The ship ran aground on the Zinders Shoals before 8 March. She was on a voyage from Surabaya to "Passaroeng", Netherlands East Indies. She was refloated and completed her voyage.
Vigilancia	Mexico	The sloop foundered in the Gulf of California 9 nautical miles (17 km) off Altata. Her crew survived. She was on a voyage from Altata to Mazatlán, Cuba.
Wanderer	United Kingdom	The fishing trawler foundered in the Dogger Bank. Her crew were rescued by the smack Oliver Cromwell (United Kingdom).
William Bartlett	United Kingdom	The schooner ran aground at North Kessock, Inverness-shire. She was on a voyage from Inverness to Fort William, Inverness-shire.
