= HMS Briton (1869) =

History

United Kingdom
- Name: HMS Briton
- Namesake: Celtic Britons
- Builder: Sheerness Dockyard
- Laid down: 1868
- Launched: 6 November 1869
- Completed: November 1871
- Fate: Sold, 1887

General characteristics (as built)
- Class & type: Briton-class wooden screw corvette
- Displacement: 1,831 long tons (1,860 t)
- Tons burthen: 1,322 bm
- Length: 220 ft (67.1 m) (p/p)
- Beam: 36 ft (11.0 m)
- Draught: 16 ft 6 in (5.0 m)
- Depth of hold: 21 ft 6 in (6.6 m)
- Installed power: 2,149 ihp (1,603 kW)
- Propulsion: 1 × shaft; 1 × 2-cylinder compound expansion steam engine; 6 × cylindrical boilers
- Sail plan: Ship rig
- Speed: 13 knots (24 km/h; 15 mph)
- Complement: 220
- Armament: 2 × 7-inch rifled muzzle-loading guns; 8 × 6.3-inch 64-pounder rifled muzzle-loading guns

HMS Briton was a Briton-class wooden screw corvette built for the Royal Navy in the late 1860s.

== Bibliography ==
- Ballard, G. A. (1938). "British Corvettes of 1875: The Larger Ram-Bowed Type". The Mariner's Mirror. 24 (January). Cambridge, UK: Society for Nautical Research: 81–94. doi:10.1080/00253359.1938.10657269.
- Chesneau, Roger; Kolesnik, Eugene M., eds. (1979). Conway's All the World's Fighting Ships 1860-1905. Greenwich, UK: Conway Maritime Press. ISBN 0-8317-0302-4.
- Lyon, David & Winfield, Rif (2004). The Sail and Steam Navy List: All the Ships of the Royal Navy 1815–1889. Chatham Publishing. ISBN 978-1-86176-032-6. OCLC 52620555.
