= HMS Barrosa (1860) =

History

United Kingdom
- Name: HMS Barrosa
- Launched: 10 March 1860
- Out of service: 1873
- Fate: Broken up in 1887

General characteristics
- Class & type: Jason-class corvette
- Tonnage: 1,700 tons BOM
- Length: 225 ft (69 m)
- Propulsion: Screw
- Complement: 240
- Armament: 21

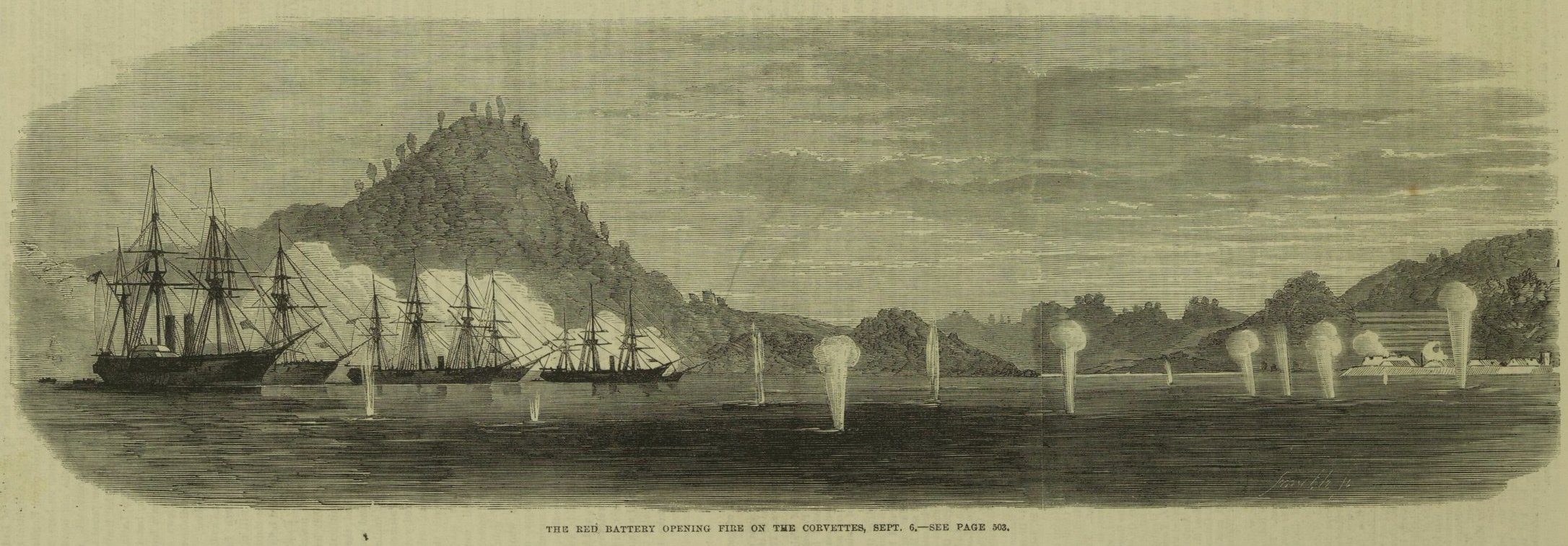
The Red Battery opening fire on the Allied corvettes, including Barrosa, at the Bombardment of Shimonoseki, 1864

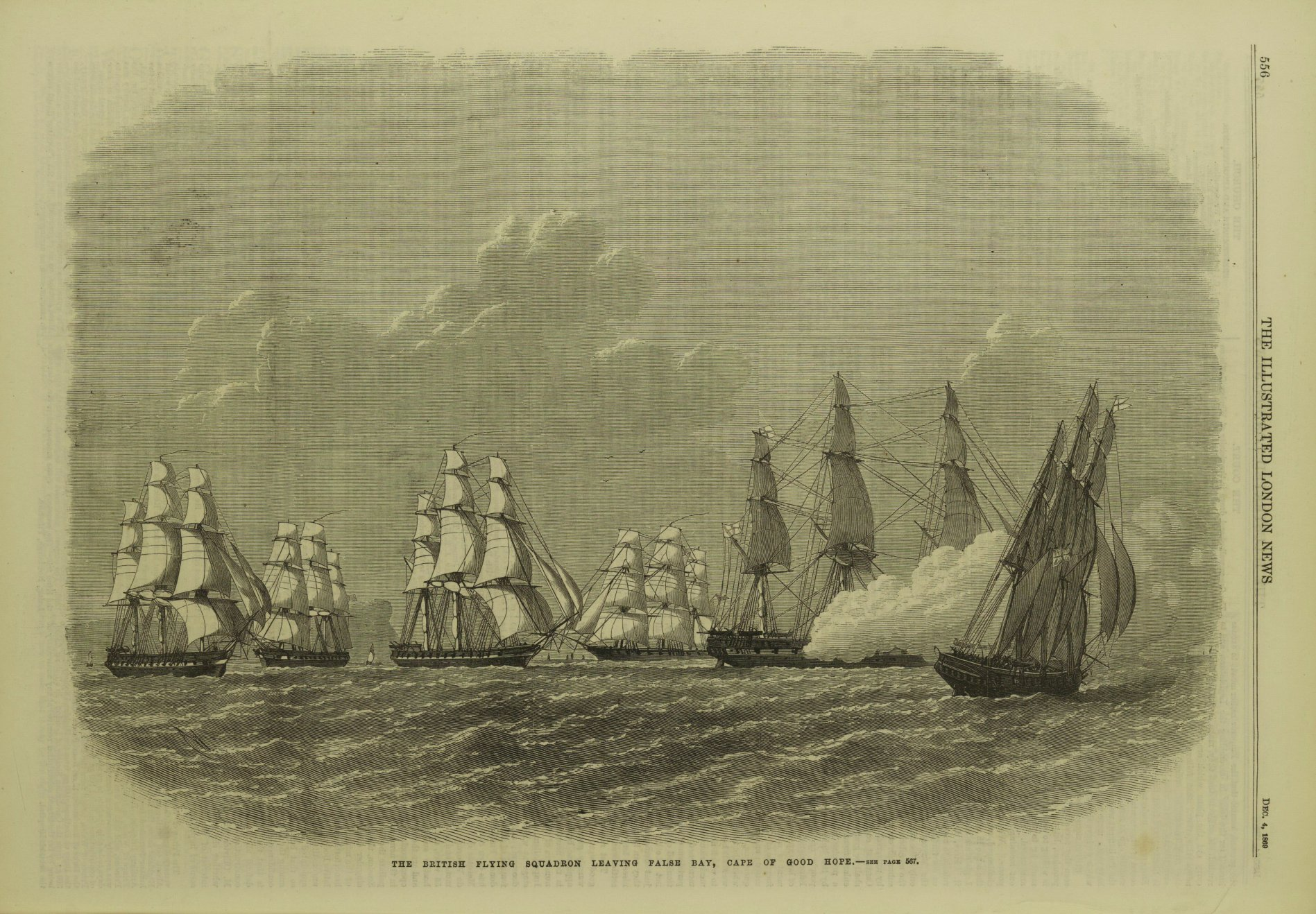
Barrosa and the British Flying Squadron leaving False Bay, Cape of Good Hope on 18 October 1869

HMS Barrosa was a Jason-class corvette launched on 10 March 1860 at Woolwich Dockyard and scrapped in 1877. She was 225 ft long, 41 ft wide and of 1,700 tons builders measurement, and armed with 16 × 8n, 1 × 7in and 4 × 40pdr guns. She bombarded Shimonoseki in 1864, and was part of the Flying Squadron between 1869 and 1873.
