= Juno-class corvette =

British warship class

Class overview
- Name: Juno class
- Builders: Deptford Dockyard and Woolwich Dockyard
- Operators: Royal Navy
- Preceded by: Jason class
- Succeeded by: Briton class
- Planned: 2
- Completed: 2
- Retired: 2

General characteristics
- Type: Corvette
- Displacement: 2,216 tons
- Tons burthen: 1,459 tons
- Length: 200 ft (between perpendiculars)
- Beam: 40 ft 4 in
- Draught: 16 ft 7 in
- Propulsion: Single screw
- Crew: 200
- Armament: 2 x 7in (6.5 ton) MLR; 4 x 64-pounder (71cwt) MLR

Juno-class corvettes were a group of two ships built for the Royal Navy during the 1860s in London to a design by Sir Edward Reed.

== Characteristics and construction ==
They were designed to carry troops with the accommodation arranged with the soldiers on the lower deck, and the sailors on the upper deck. Juno was built by Deptford Dockyard and laid down in 1866, launched on 28 November 1867 and completed in May 1868. It displacement was 2,083 tons, its crew 200, top speed it achieved was 10.53 knots. Armaments for the ship were usually two 7-inch MLR and four 64-pounder cannons, later being rearmed with eight 64-pounders. Thalia was the last ship to be built at Woolwich Royal Dockyard, laid down in 1866 and launched 14 July 1869 and commissioned for the Royal Navy in May 1870. It had a displacement of 2,240 tons, its crew numbered 200, top speed it achieved was 11.13 knots, and it was armed with two 7-inch MLR and four 64-pounder cannons. It was later being rearmed with six 64-pounders.

== Ships ==
| Ship | Builder | Laid down | Launched | Completed | Fate |
|---|---|---|---|---|---|
| Juno | Deptford Dockyard | 1866 | 28 November 1867 | May 1868 | Sold for scrap, December 1887 |
| Thalia | Woolwich Dockyard | 1866 | 14 July 1869 | March 1870 | Troopship October 1886; powder hulk 1891; depot ship February 1915; sold for scrap (to Rose Street Foundry), 16 September 1920 |

Note Thalia was the last ship to be built at Woolwich Dockyard, and received the engine intended originally for the cancelled (1864) wooden frigate Ister.

== Service history ==
The Surveyor to the Royal Navy during 1863 to 1870, Sir Edward Reid was the designer of these two wooden screw corvettes, HMS Juno and HMS Thalia. Both ships were completed by 1870 compliant to British demands at that time to match the French, American, and Russian small ships at that time. The ships were made alongside 35 others in the 1867-1868 programme written in the Parliamentary Debates. Both ships were included in the ¨op¨ in the 1878 official list. At that time Juno was in China and Thalia was in the Devonport Dockyard. Although they were regarded as ¨Fighting Ships¨. They shared this classification with Iris, Mercury, and the torpedo boat Lightning. In 1882, Thalia was named for ¨Particular¨ which meant at that time she was going to be fitted to be a troopship. In 1886, Thalia was refitted to be a troopship, hulked in 1891 and later in 1915 to be a depot ship. Juno was sold in 1887.
