= HMS Galatea (1859) =

Ariadne class frigate in the Royal Navy

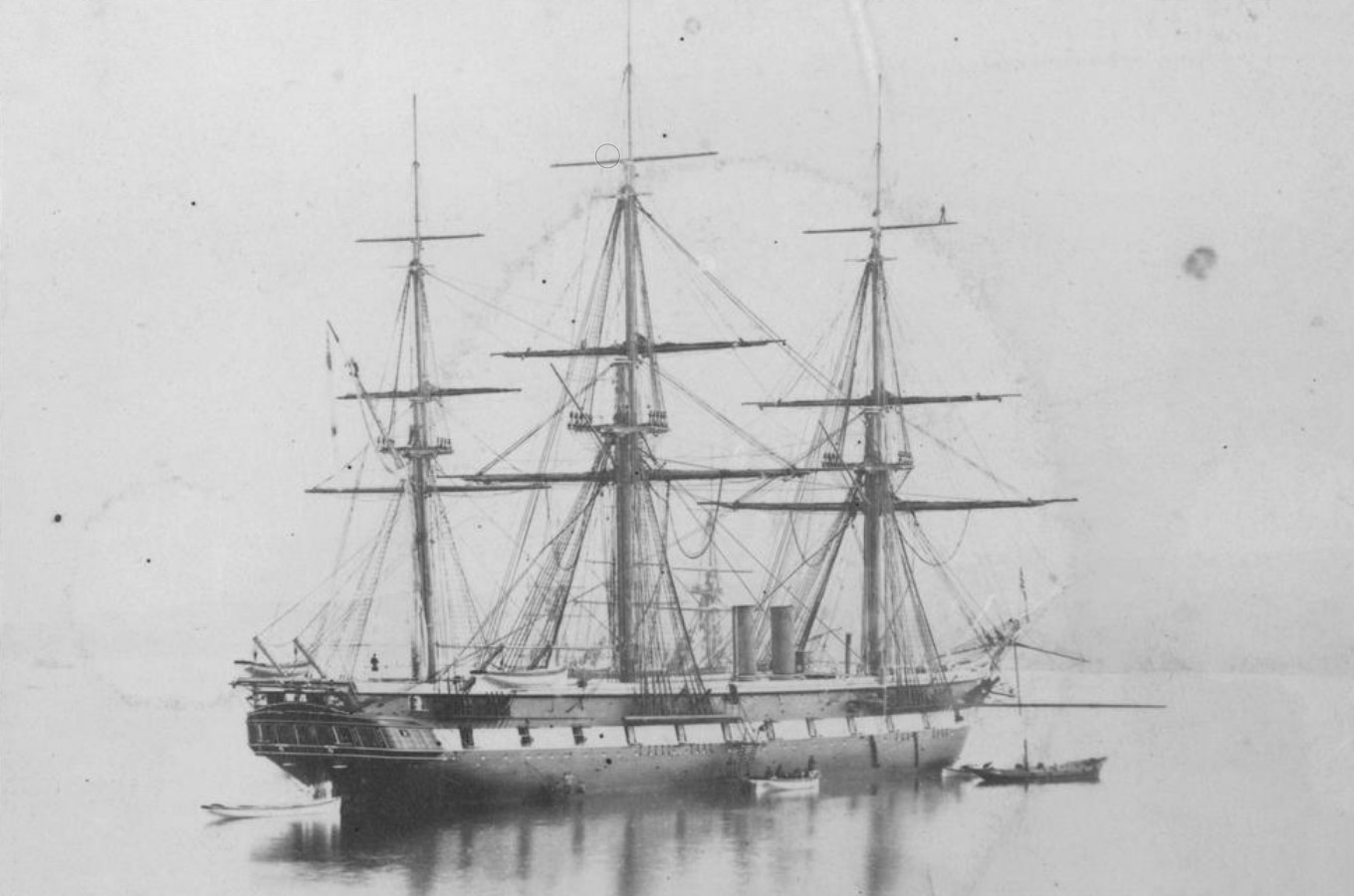
- HMS Galatea pictured c.1868.

History

United Kingdom
- Name: HMS Galatea
- Ordered: 9 April 1856
- Builder: Woolwich Dockyard; Engines by John Penn & Son
- Laid down: 2 February 1857
- Launched: 14 September 1859
- Completed: By February 1862
- Fate: Broken up in June 1883

General characteristics
- Class & type: Jason-class corvette
- Displacement: 4,686 tons
- Tons burthen: 3,227 bm
- Length: 280 ft (85.3 m) (overall); 245 ft 8 in (74.9 m) (keel)
- Beam: 50 ft (15.2 m)
- Depth of hold: 19 ft 4 in (5.89 m)
- Propulsion: Sails; 2-cyl. horizontal single expansion; Rectangular boilers; Single screw; 800 nhp; 3,061 ihp = 11.796 kn
- Sail plan: Full-rigged ship
- Complement: 450
- Armament: Middle deck: 24 × 10 in (85 cwt) MLSB shell guns (broadside); Upper deck: 2 × 68-pdr (65 cwt) MLSB (pivot-mounted); Later replaced by slide-mounted 110-pdr Armstrong BLs

HMS Galatea was a Jason-class 26-gun, sixth-rate, wooden screw frigate in the Royal Navy, launched in 1859 and broken up 1883.

== Service ==
She was first assigned to the Channel Squadron in 1862 under Captain Rochfort Maguire. From there she served both in the Baltic and the Mediterranean. Then from 1863 to 1865 to the North America and West Indies Station based in Bermuda and Halifax.

On 9 November 1865 the Galatea and HMS Lily participated in a reprisal raid on Cap-Haïtien, bombarding the forts defending the harbour and landing government troops. The raid was provoked by rebel forces having attacked the British Consulate on 23 October 1865 and the loss of HMS Bulldog (1845) that same day in the fighting that followed.

In 1866, after a refit, she went on a world cruise, under the command of Prince Alfred, Duke of Edinburgh.

On 2 November 1868, she ran aground in Plymouth Sound and was damaged. It was estimated that it would take several days to repair her. While in Sydney, Galatea was placed in the Fitzroy Dock at Cockatoo Island Dockyard in 1870.

On 18 May 1882 she conveyed the Duke of Edinburgh to the official opening of the new Eddystone Light.

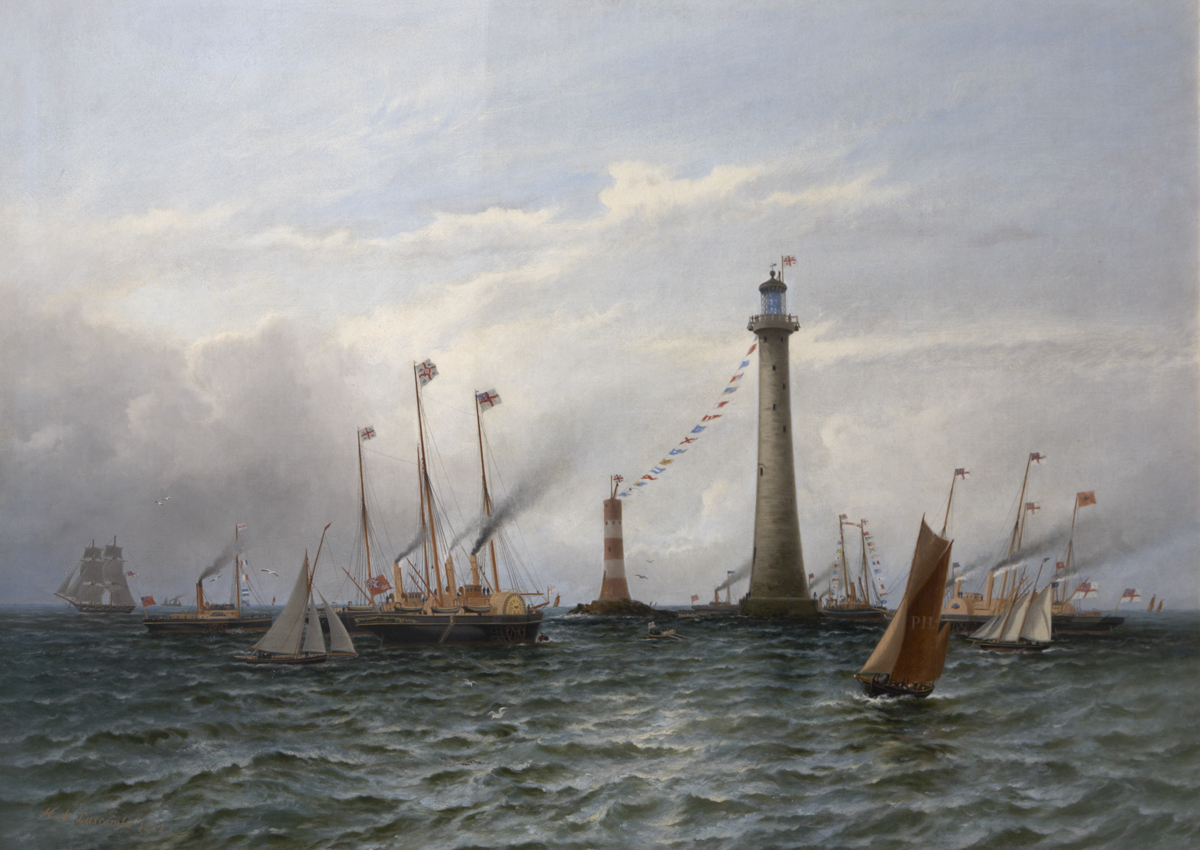
The Opening of the New Eddystone Lighthouse by HRH The Duke of Edinburgh, 18 May 1882, by Henry A. Luscombe

== Paintings ==
While in Halifax, Galatea inspired a trio of dramatic paintings by ship portrait artist John O'Brien.

== Gallery ==
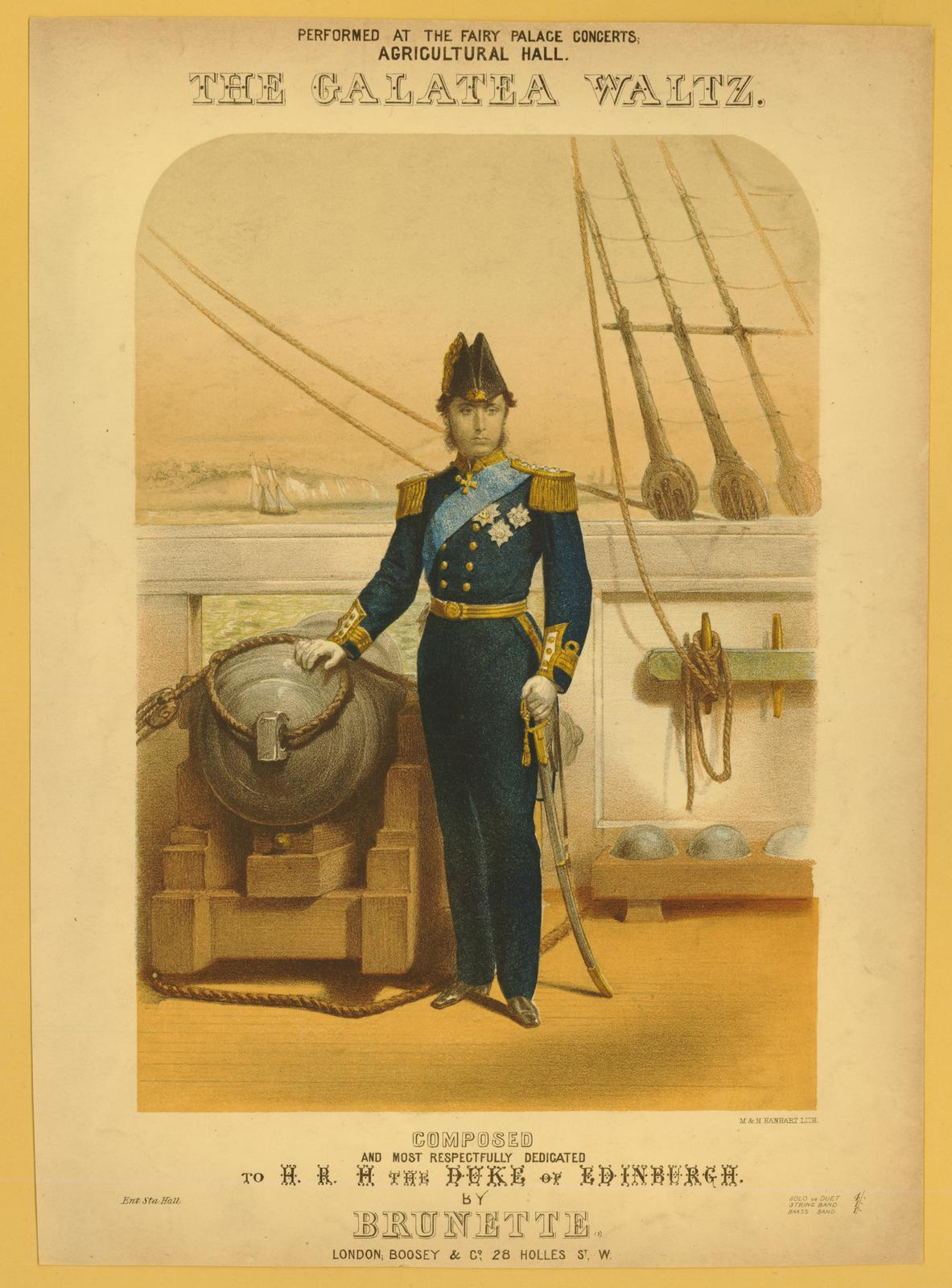
Prince Alfred on the Galatea

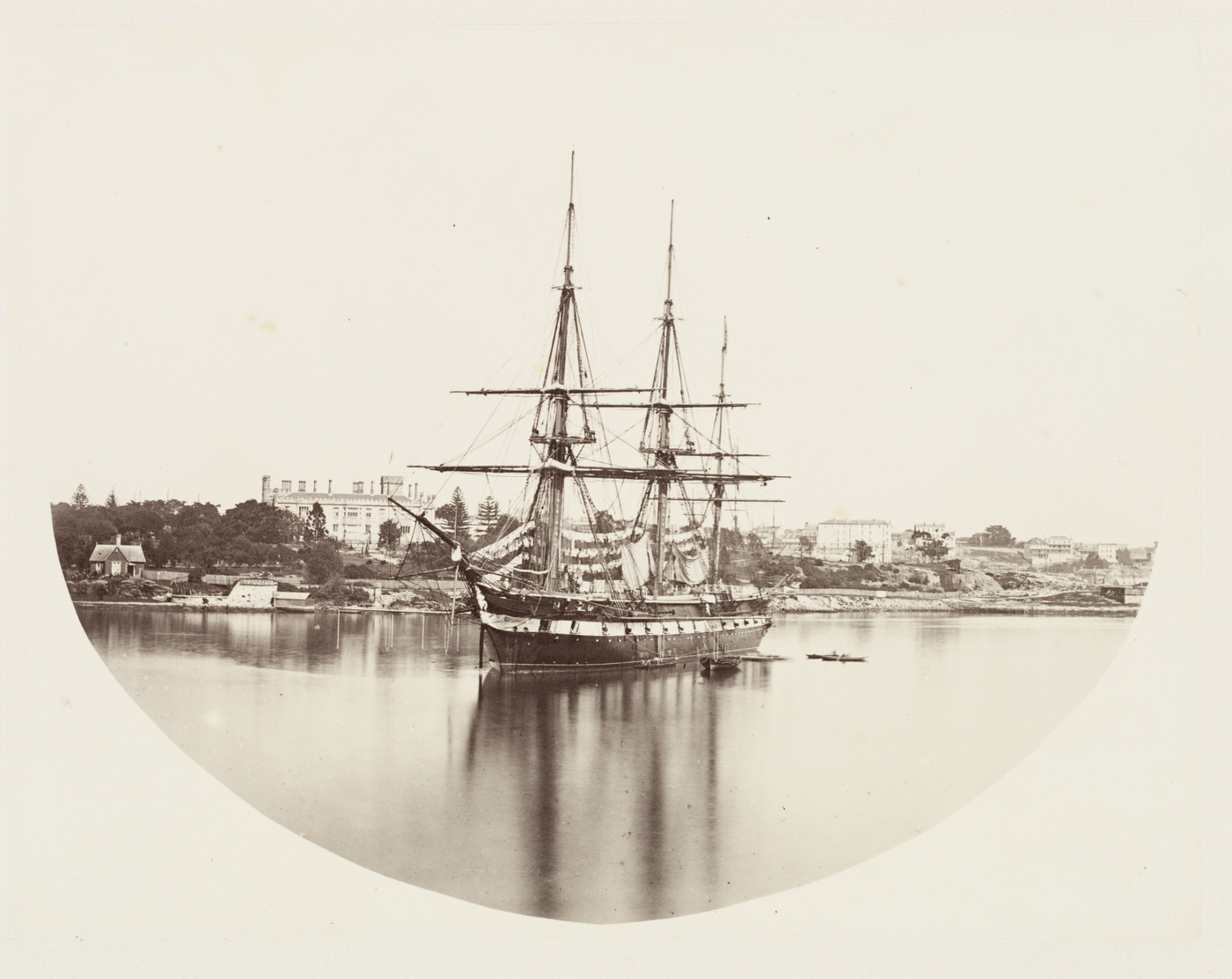
HMS Galatea in Farm Cove; Government House to the left, c. 1870, [attributed Charles Pickering]

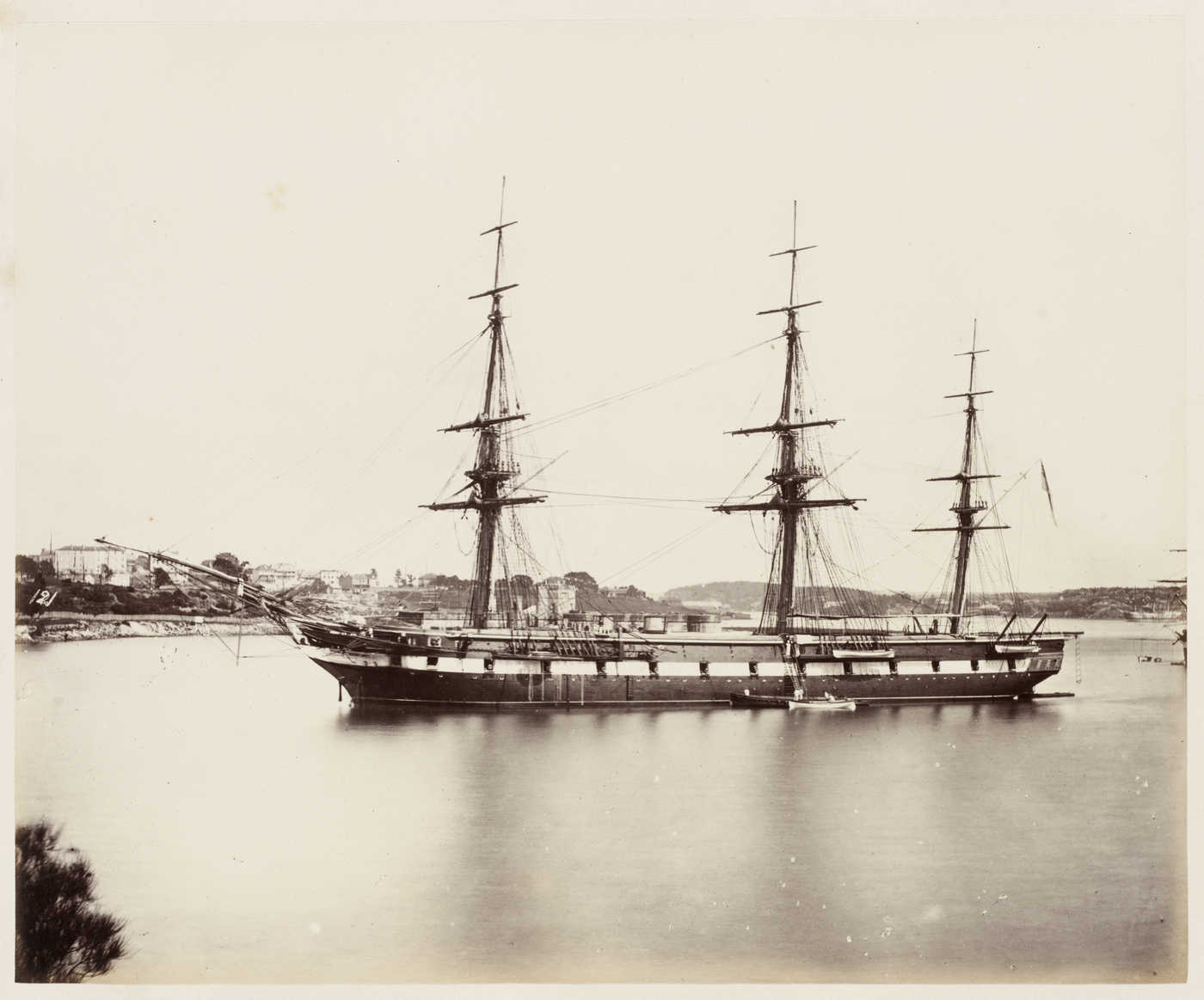
HMS Galatea in Port Jackson, Sydney, c. 1870, [attributed Charles Pickering]

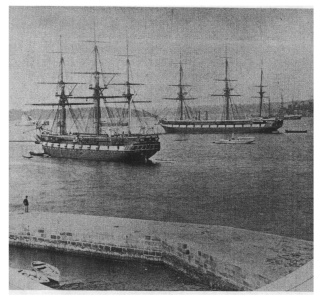
Photograph of Galatea, and HMS Challenger

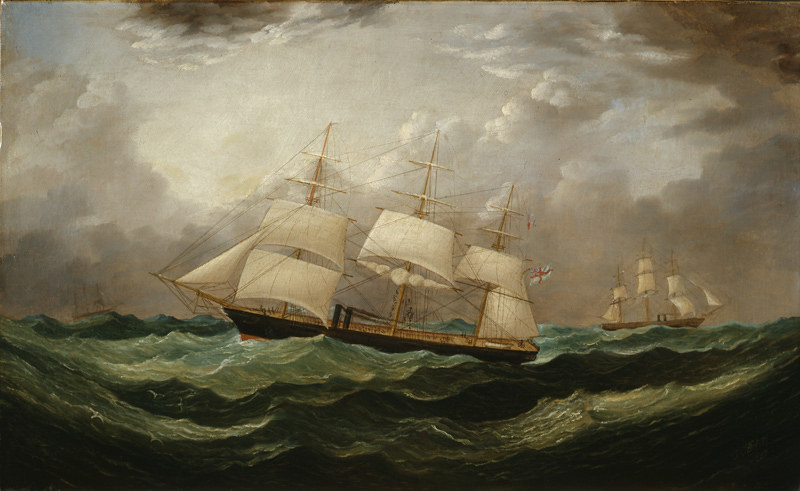
Painting by John O'Brien, circa 1888
