= HMS Orestes (1860) =

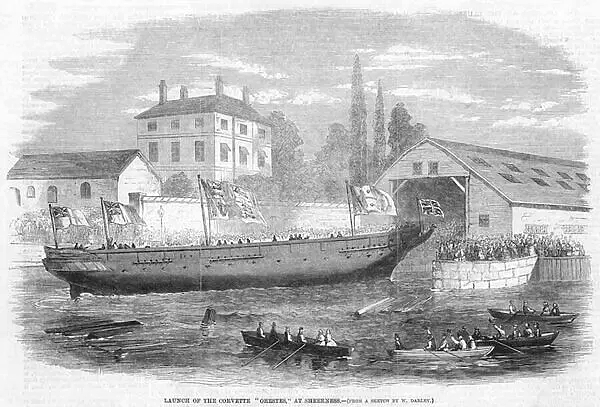
- Launch of the Orestes, at Sheerness (from a sketch by W. Darley), Illustrated Times 1860

History

United Kingdom
- Name: HMS Orestes
- Launched: 18 August 1860
- Out of service: 1865
- Fate: Broken up

General characteristics
- Class & type: Jason-class corvette
- Tonnage: 1717 tons
- Displacement: 2431 tons
- Propulsion: Screw
- Complement: 240
- Armament: 21

HMS Orestes was a wooden screw corvette launched from Sheerness dockyard in 1860 for the Royal Navy. She was commissioned in 1861 and served on the Cape of Good Hope station until 1865. She was broken up in Portsmouth in November 1866.
