= HMS Druid (1869) =

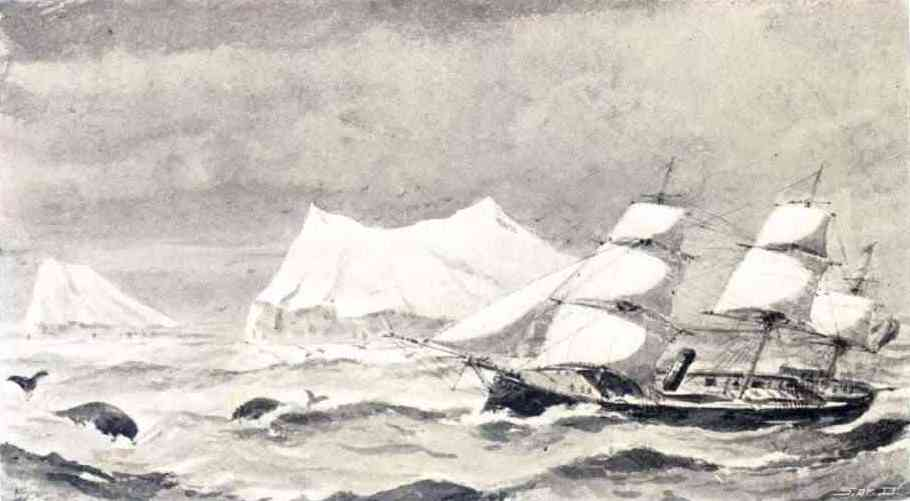
- The Druid amongst icebergs in the Straits of Belleisle

History

United Kingdom
- Name: HMS Druid
- Namesake: Druid
- Builder: Deptford Dockyard
- Laid down: 1868
- Launched: 13 March 1869
- Completed: February 1872
- Fate: Sold for scrap, 10 November 1886

General characteristics (as built)
- Class & type: Briton-class wooden screw corvette
- Displacement: 1,791 long tons (1,820 t)
- Tons burthen: 1,322 bm
- Length: 220 ft (67.1 m) (p/p)
- Beam: 36 ft (11.0 m)
- Draught: 16 ft 6 in (5.0 m)
- Depth of hold: 21 ft 6 in (6.6 m)
- Installed power: 2,272 ihp (1,694 kW)
- Propulsion: 1 × shaft; 1 × 2-cylinder steam engine; 4 × rectangular boilers
- Sail plan: Ship rig
- Speed: 13 knots (24 km/h; 15 mph)
- Complement: 220
- Armament: 2 × 7-inch rifled muzzle-loading guns; 8 × 6.3-inch 64-pounder rifled muzzle-loading guns

HMS Druid was a Briton-class wooden screw corvette built for the Royal Navy in the late 1860s. She spent her service life overseas on the Cape of Good Hope and North America and West Indies Stations and was sold for scrap in 1886.

== Design and description ==
The ship was 220 feet (67.1 m) long between perpendiculars and had a beam of 36 feet (11.0 m). Forward, she had a draught of 12 feet 9 inches (3.9 m), and aft she drew 16 ft 3 in (5.0 m). The ship displaced 1,791 long tons (1,820 t) and had a burthen of 1,322 tons. Her crew consisted of 220 officers and ratings.

Druid had a two-cylinder horizontal steam engine, built by Maudslay, Sons and Field, driving a single 15-foot (4.6 m) propeller. Four rectangular boilers provided steam to the engine so that it produced a total of 2,272 indicated horsepower (1,694 kW) which gave her a maximum speed of about 13.066 knots (24.198 km/h; 15.036 mph) during sea trials. The ship carried 285 long tons (290 t) of coal. Although no information is available on her range, Admiral G. A. Ballard estimated that Druid had only about two-thirds the range of her sisters, despite the additional coal that she carried, due to the greater efficiency of the compound expansion engines used in the other ships.

She was ship rigged and had a sail area of 15,000 square feet (1,394 m^{2}). The lower masts were made of iron, and the other masts were wood. She was a poor sailer and her best speed under sail alone was about 11 knots (20 km/h; 13 mph). Ballard attributed the class's poor performance under sail to the drag of the propeller, which could neither be hoisted out of the water, nor feathered. He also attributed their sluggish steering under sail to interference with the flow of water to the rudder by the stationary propeller. The ship was re-rigged as a barque after her first commission.

Druid was initially armed with a mix of 7-inch and 64-pounder 71 cwt (Note: "cwt" is the abbreviation for hundredweight, 71 cwt referring to the weight of the gun.) rifled muzzle-loading guns. The eight 64-pounder guns were mounted on the broadside while the two 7-inch (178 mm) guns were mounted on the forecastle and poop as chase guns. After the completion of their first commissions, the two ships were rearmed with a total of fourteen lighter 64-cwt 64-pounder guns, two of which replaced the 7-inch guns as chase guns.

== Service ==
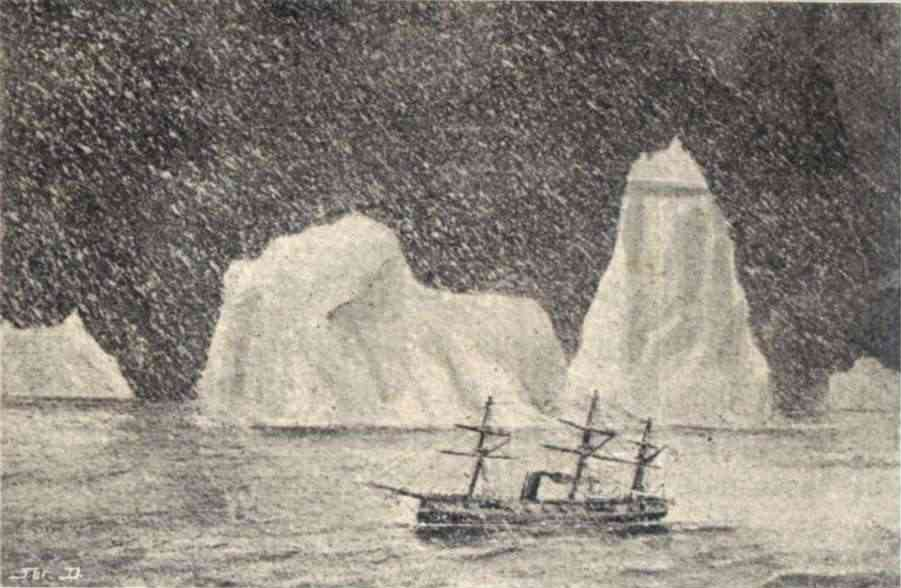
The Druid in Bonavista Bay, Newfoundland

Druid was laid down in 1868 and launched on 13 March 1869 in the presence of Princess Louise and Prince Arthur. She was completed in February 1872 and was the last ship to be built at Deptford Dockyard.

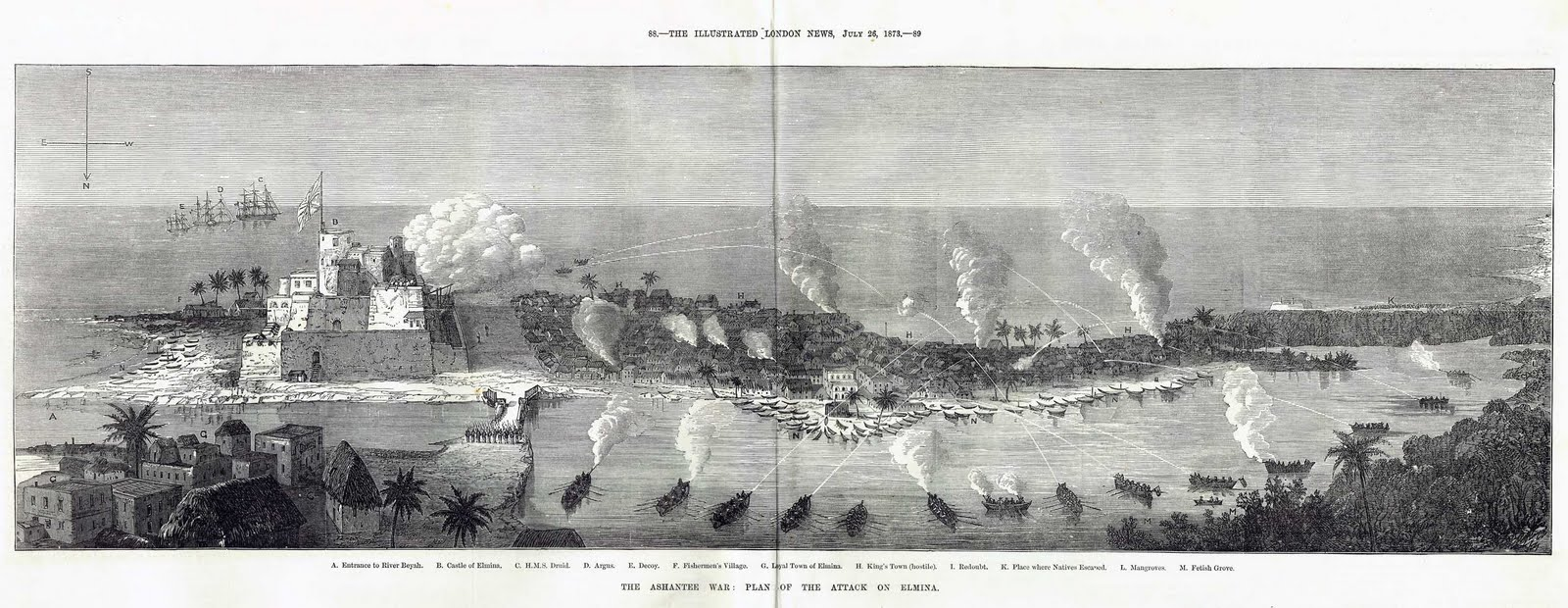
Druid at the bombardment of Elmina on 13 June 1873

The ship was initially assigned to the Cape of Good Hope Station, commanded by Captain the Honorable Maurice Nelson, where she remained for two years before being transferred to the North America and West Indies Station. Druid was refitted upon her return home in December 1876, which included rearmament. The ship recommissioned in February 1879 and returned to the North American Station. She returned home in September 1882 and was paid off. Druid was laid up in the Medway until she was sold for breaking up to Castle of Charlton on 10 November 1886.

== Bibliography ==
- Ballard, G. A. (1938). "British Corvettes of 1875: The Larger Ram-Bowed Type". Mariner's Mirror. 24 (January). Cambridge, UK: Society for Nautical Research: 81–94. doi:10.1080/00253359.1938.10657269.
- Chesneau, Roger; Kolesnik, Eugene M., eds. (1979). Conway's All the World's Fighting Ships 1860–1905. Greenwich, UK: Conway Maritime Press. ISBN 0-8317-0302-4.
- Lyon, David & Winfield, Rif (2004). The Sail and Steam Navy List: All the Ships of the Royal Navy 1815–1889. Chatham Publishing. ISBN 978-1-86176-032-6. OCLC 52620555.
