= HMS Rattlesnake (1861) =

History

United Kingdom
- Name: HMS Rattlesnake
- Launched: 9 July 1861
- Out of service: 1874
- Honours and awards: Participated in: Third Anglo-Ashanti War (1873–1874)
- Fate: Broken up in 1882

General characteristics
- Class & type: Jason-class corvette
- Displacement: 2431 tons
- Length: 225 feet
- Propulsion: Screw
- Sail plan: rigging
- Speed: 11.66 knots
- Complement: 240
- Armament: 21

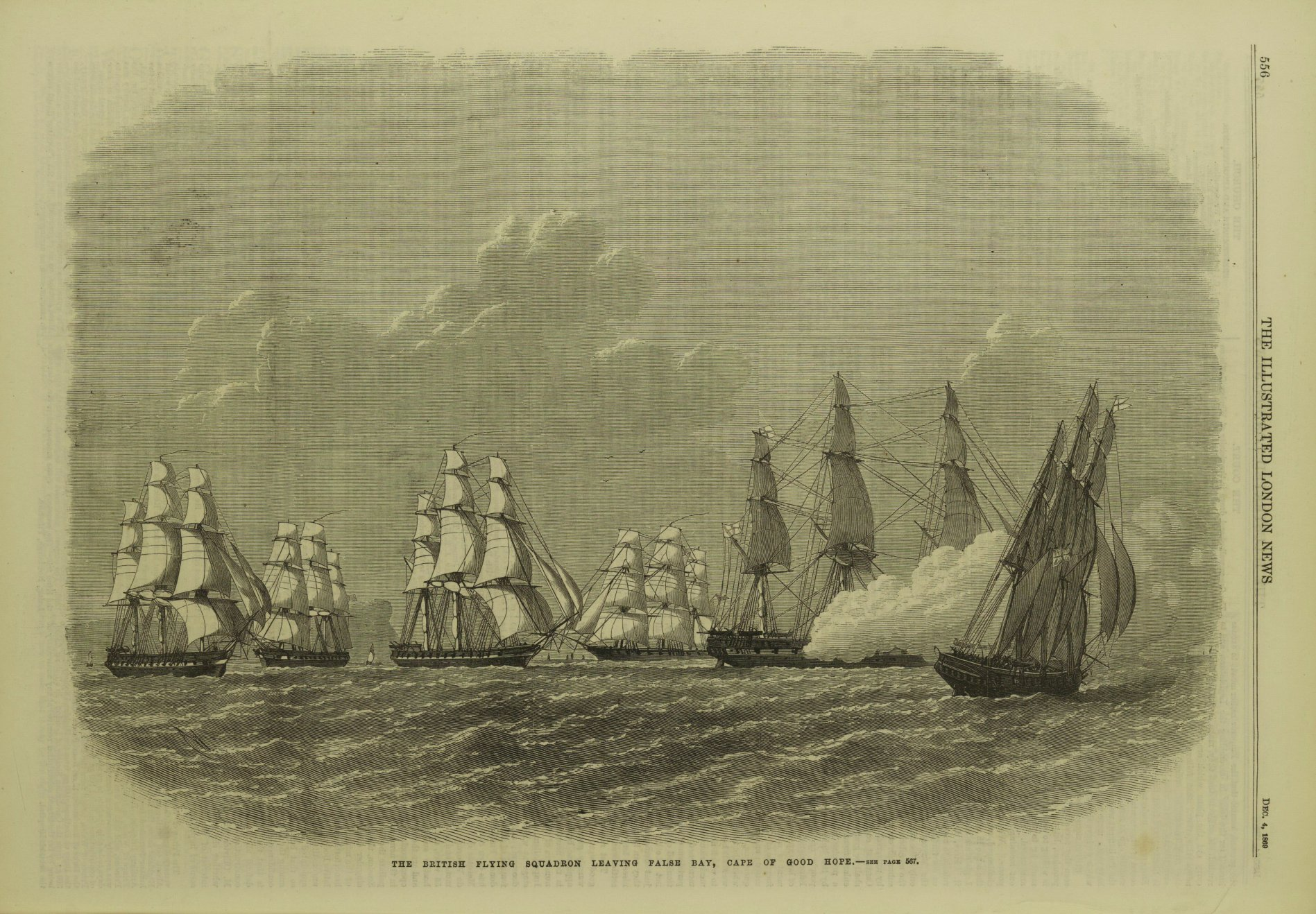
Rattesnake (far right) sends off the British Flying Squadron from False Bay, Cape of Good Hope on 18 October 1869

HMS Rattlesnake was a 21-gun Jason-class corvette launched in 1861 at Chatham Dockyard and broken up in 1882. During her third commission from 1871–1873 she was the flagship of Commodore John Edmund Commerell, Commander-in-Chief Cape of Good Hope and West Coast of Africa Station, who was wounded at the start of the Third Anglo-Ashanti War. Rattlesnake was propelled by a Ravenhill & Salkeld engine delivering 1,628 indicated horsepower (1,214 kW). When operating under sailpower, her funnel could be retracted to clear the rigging and her propeller lifted into a special housing aft to streamline her hullform.
