= Jason-class corvette =

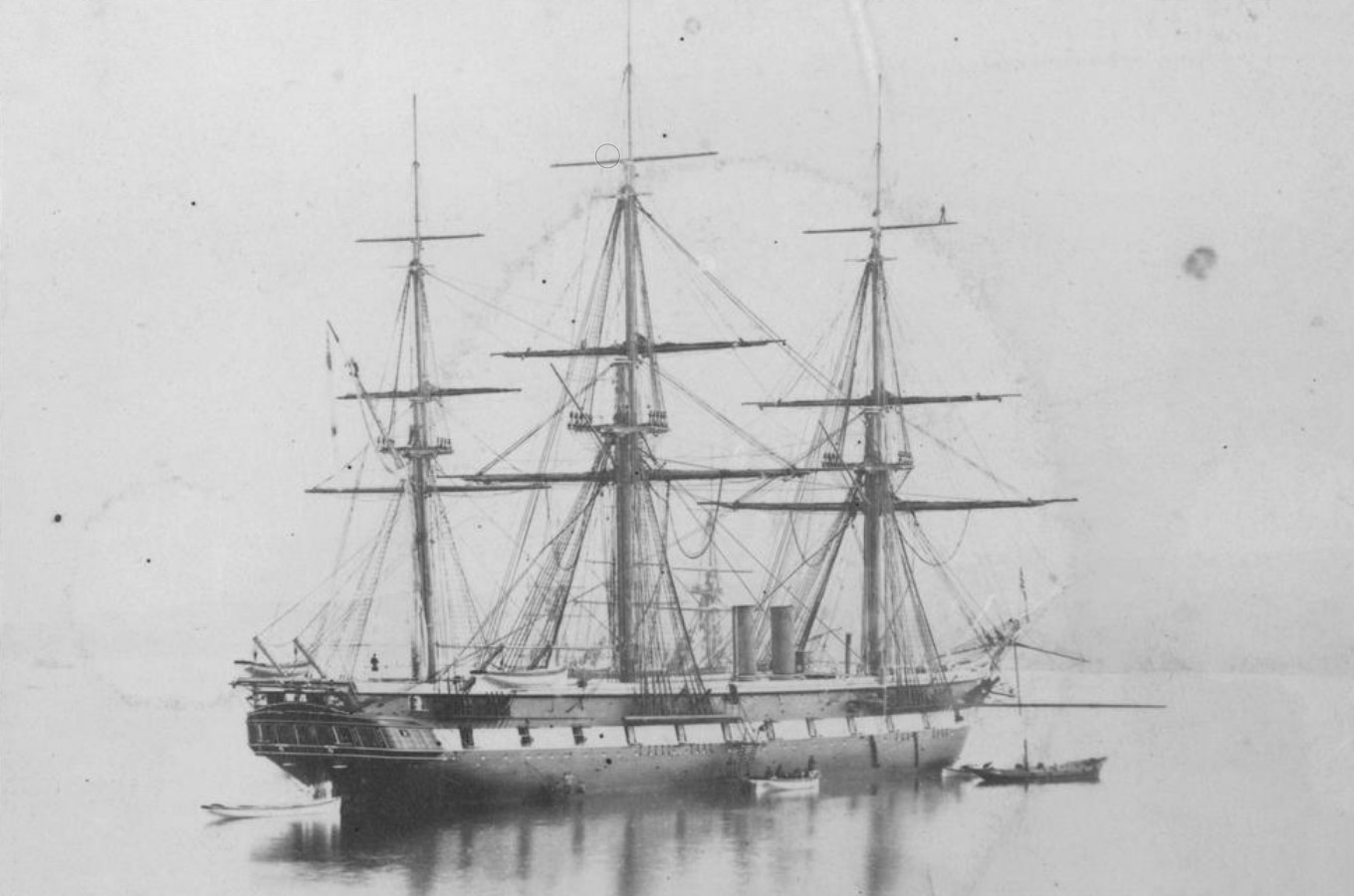
- An example of a Jason-class ship

Class overview
- Name: Jason class
- Operators: Royal Navy
- Preceded by: Pearl class
- Succeeded by: Juno class
- Built: 1859–1863
- Planned: 10
- Completed: 7
- Retired: 7

General characteristics
- Type: Corvette
- Displacement: 3,227 tons
- Length: 280 ft (85 m)
- Propulsion: Screw
- Speed: 11.8 knots (21.9 km/h; 13.6 mph)
- Armament: 20 guns

The Jason-class corvette was a type of wooden screw corvette made between 1859 and 1863. There were a total of seven ships of this class made by the authorization of the Royal Navy.

== History ==
The first three ships were ordered in 1856 as units of the preceding Pearl-class corvette although HMS Galatea was quickly converted to a fourth rate later, but was first the Jason-class corvette. The authorization to make these ships came from the surveyor at that time, who was in charge of making the North Star class. Two ships from the North Star class were then converted into their own class, the Jason class. They had covered decks and it was approved on 23 January 1860. Six more vessels were then brought into the Jason class and ordered by the Royal Navy to be made in 1860. An additional pair was also added in 1861. However, all of these but HMS Menai were made, the rest were Jason class and only Menai survived to become a North Star-class vessel. The remnants of the North Star-class ships were then called the Jason-class ships which were used mostly in Australia to patrol or other duties.

== Characteristics ==
These corvettes were open battery ships, first 21 (then 17) guns. This 21-gun design were of the Surveyor Departments design and they were approved on 10 February 1858. All of these ships were referred to as "Troop Frigates"; all of them were ship-rigged with telescopic funnels. The Armstrong breech-loading guns that were on the ships were removed in 1864 following a string of catastrophic accidents. In the big picture, 4 × 8 guns were replaced by 4 × 4-pdrs (28 cwt/8 ft), then all the surviving quartet were all reduced to 17 guns instead of 21 by 1869. Jason had eight 64-pdrs and eight 8-inch shells and to add it had a 110-pdr Armstrong cannon. Wolverine and Barrosa had 17 × 64 pdrs; while Rattlesnake had a fair 9 × 64-pdrs (8 × 8 in shells) which of course was pivot mounted. Some of the ships had severe engine problems such as Wolverine; its engine was never satisfactory.

== Ships ==
- HMS Jason
- HMS Barrosa
- HMS Galatea
- HMS Orpheus
- HMS Orestes
- HMS Rattlesnake
- HMS Wolverine
