= Briton-class corvette =

Royal Navy wooden screw corvettes

Class overview
- Name: Briton class
- Operators: Royal Navy
- Preceded by: Juno class
- Succeeded by: Volage class
- Built: 1868–1872
- In service: 1871–1887
- Completed: 3
- Scrapped: 3

General characteristics (as built)
- Type: Wooden screw corvette
- Displacement: 1,730–1,860 long tons (1,760–1,890 t)
- Tons burthen: 1,322 bm
- Length: 220 ft (67.1 m) (p/p)
- Beam: 36 ft (11.0 m)
- Draught: 16 ft 6 in (5.0 m)
- Depth of hold: 21 ft 6 in (6.6 m)
- Installed power: 2,149–2,275 ihp (1,603–1,696 kW)
- Propulsion: 1 × shaft; 1 × 2-cylinder steam engine; 4 or 6 × boilers
- Sail plan: Ship rig
- Speed: 13 knots (24 km/h; 15 mph)
- Range: 2,000 nmi (3,700 km; 2,300 mi) at 10 knots (19 km/h; 12 mph)
- Complement: 220
- Armament: 2 × 7-inch rifled muzzle-loading guns; 8 × 6.3-inch 64-pounder rifled muzzle-loading guns; or; 14 × 6.3-inch 64-pounder rifled muzzle-loading guns

The Briton class was a group of three wooden screw corvettes built for the Royal Navy in the late 1860s. All three ships of the class only served overseas during their brief service lives. Between them, they were assigned to the China, East Indies, African, North American, and the Pacific Stations. All three were regarded as obsolete 15 years after they were completed, and they were sold in 1886–87.

== Design and description ==
The Briton-class corvettes were designed by Sir Edward Reed, the Director of Naval Construction, as lengthened versions of the Eclipse-class sloops. Like the smaller ships, they had a ram-style bow to reduce weight forward by elimination of the knee above the stem. Similarly, he shortened the counter at the stern to save weight.

The ships were 220 feet (67.1 m) long between perpendiculars and had a beam of 36 feet (11.0 m). Forward, the ships had a draught of 12 feet 9 inches (3.9 m), but aft they drew 16 ft 3 in (5.0 m). They displaced from 1,730 to 1,860 long tons (1,760 to 1,890 t) and had a burthen of 1,322 tons. The hull was built entirely from wood except for iron crossbeams. Their crew consisted of 220 officers and ratings.

Two different types of engines and boilers were used with this class. HMS Druid, the first ship completed, had a two-cylinder horizontal steam engine driving a single 15-foot (4.6 m) propeller. Four rectangular boilers provided steam to the engine at a working pressure of 30 psi (207 kPa; 2 kgf/cm^{2}). The engine produced a total of 2,272 indicated horsepower (1,694 kW) which gave her a maximum speed of about 13.066 knots (24.198 km/h; 15.036 mph) during sea trials. In contrast, the two later ships had a two-cylinder horizontal compound expansion steam engine, driving a single 15-foot or 14-foot-9-inch (4.50 m) propeller. Six cylindrical boilers provided steam to the engines at a working pressure of 60–64 psi (414–441 kPa; 4–4 kgf/cm^{2}). The engines produced between 2,149 and 2,275 indicated horsepower (1,603 and 1,696 kW) which gave the two ships a maximum speed over 13 knots (24 km/h; 15 mph). Briton and Thetis carried 255 long tons (259 t) of coal, while Druid carried an additional 30 long tons (30 t). Although no information is available on their range, Admiral G. A. Ballard estimated that Druid had only about two-thirds the range of her sisters, despite the additional coal that she carried, due to the greater efficiency of the compound expansion engines.

The class was ship rigged and had a sail area of 15,000 square feet (1,394 m^{2}). The lower masts were made of iron, but the other masts were wood. The ships were poor sailors and their best speed under sail alone was about 11 knots (20 km/h; 13 mph). Ballard attributed their poor performance under sail to the drag of the propeller, which could neither be hoisted out of the water, nor feathered. He also attributed their sluggish steering under sail to interference with the flow of water to the rudder by the fixed propeller. The first two ships were re-rigged as barques after their first commission. (Note: Ballard contradicts this when he describes an incident in 1880 as a young officer where a bosun pointed out to him that the largest (Achilles) and smallest (Briton) ship rigs in the Royal Navy were berthed adjacent to each other.)

The first two ships were initially armed with a mix of 7-inch and 64-pounder 71 cwt (Note: "cwt" is the abbreviation for hundredweight, 64 cwt referring to the weight of the gun.) rifled muzzle-loading guns. The eight 64-pounder guns were mounted on the broadside while the two 7-inch (178 mm) guns were mounted on the forecastle and poop as chase guns. The 16-calibre 7-inch gun weighed 6.5 long tons (6.6 t) and fired a 112-pound (50.8 kg) shell. It was credited with the nominal ability to penetrate 7.7-inch (196 mm) armour. After the completion of their first commissions, the two ships were rearmed with a total of fourteen lighter 64-cwt 64-pounder guns, two of which replaced the 7-inch guns as chase guns. Thetis, the last ship completed, was given this armament from the beginning.

== Ships ==
Ship	Builder	Laid down	Launched	Completed	Fate
Druid	Deptford Dockyard	1868	13 March 1869	February 1872	Sold for scrap, 10 November 1886
Briton	Sheerness Dockyard	1868	6 November 1869	November 1871	Sold, 1887
Thetis	Devonport Dockyard	29 August 1870	26 October 1871	1 February 1873	Sold for scrap, November 1887

Druid was the last ship to be built at Deptford Dockyard. The ship was initially assigned to the Cape of Good Hope Station, where she remained for two years before being transferred to the North America and West Indies Station. Druid was refitted upon her return home in December 1876, which included rearmament. The ship recommissioned in February 1879 and returned to the North American Station. She returned home in September 1882 and was paid off. Druid was laid up in the Medway until she was sold for scrap in 1886.

Briton was the first of the trio to be commissioned and was assigned to the East Indies Station in 1871. She remained there for four and a half years, mostly engaged on the suppression of the slave trade. The ship was refitted and rearmed upon her return home and Briton remained in reserve until recommissioned in 1881 for service on the Cape Station. She was transferred back to the East Indies after two years on the Cape. Her crew was relieved in 1884 by another sent out from Britain and the ship remained on station until she was sold, less her armament, in Bombay in 1887.

The construction of Thetis followed her sisters after a two-year delay and she was initially assigned to the China Station in 1873. She was transferred to the East Indies after a year on station and returned home in 1877 where she was refitted. Two years later, the ship was assigned to the Pacific Station until she was ordered home in 1883. Thetis was paid off after her arrival and was sold in 1887.

== Bibliography ==
- Ballard, G. A. (1938). "British Corvettes of 1875: The Larger Ram-Bowed Type". Mariner's Mirror. 24 (January). Cambridge, UK: Society for Nautical Research: 81–94.
- Chesneau, Roger; Kolesnik, Eugene M., eds. (1979). Conway's All the World's Fighting Ships 1860–1905. Greenwich, UK: Conway Maritime Press. ISBN 0-8317-0302-4.
- Lyon, David & Winfield, Rif (2004). The Sail and Steam Navy List: All the Ships of the Royal Navy 1815–1889. Chatham Publishing. ISBN 978-1-86176-032-6. OCLC 52620555.
