= USS Corwin =

Gunboat of the United States Navy

History

United States
- Name: USS Corwin
- Launched: 1849
- Acquired: September 1861
- In service: 1861
- Out of service: 1865
- Fate: Returned to the U.S. Treasury Department after the war’s end

General characteristics
- Type: Gunboat
- Displacement: 330 long tons (340 t)
- Length: 125 ft (38 m)
- Draft: 7 ft (2.1 m)
- Propulsion: Steam engine; side wheel-propelled
- Armament: 2 × 32-pounder guns; 2 × 12-pounder guns

USS Corwin was a steamer acquired by the Union Navy during the American Civil War. She was used by the Union Navy to patrol navigable waterways of the Confederacy to prevent the South from trading with other countries.

== Service history ==
Corwin was a side wheel gunboat, wooden steamer built at Philadelphia, Pennsylvania, in 1849 for the United States Coast Survey, transferred to the United States Revenue-Marine in April 1861. Transferred to the United States Department of the Navy for special service in September 1861, under command of Lieutenant Thomas S. Phelps. The 330 long tons (340 t) vessel was armed with two medium 32-pounders and two 12-pounder guns. She surveyed the coast of North Carolina. For example, On 14 November 1861, the Corwin, a side-wheel gunboat, wooden steamer revenue cutter, repulsed the gunboat CSS Curlew in Hatteras Inlet, an estuary in North Carolina.

On 1 April 1862, she joined the North Atlantic Blockading Squadron for duty in Hampton Roads and adjacent waters. On 13 July, she was detached and ordered to the Potomac River for survey work. Corwin repulsed another attack by Curlew in Hatteras Inlet on 14 November; and rendered effective assistance to the steamer Quinnebaug aground off Beaufort, North Carolina on 22 July 1865. She was returned to the U.S. Coast Survey, Treasury Department, after the war.
