= HMS Jason (1859) =

British naval vessel

History

United Kingdom
- Name: HMS Jason
- Namesake: Jason
- Launched: 10 November 1859
- Out of service: 1870
- Fate: Broken up in 1877

General characteristics
- Class & type: Jason-class corvette
- Tonnage: 1711 tons
- Displacement: 2431 tons`
- Length: 225 feet
- Propulsion: Screw
- Complement: 240
- Armament: 21 guns

HMS Jason was a wooden screw corvette launched on 10 November 1859 for the Royal Navy at Devonport Dockyard. She was broken up in 1877.
