= HMS Thetis (1871) =

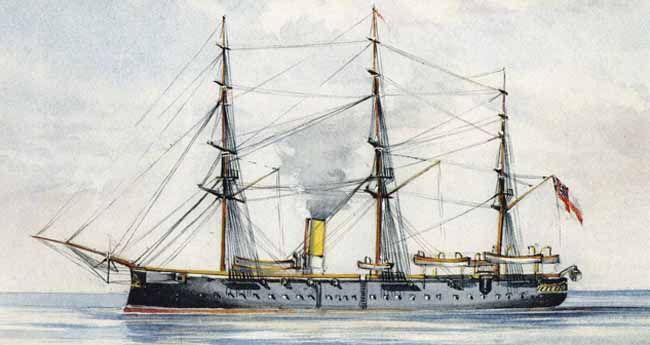

History

United Kingdom
- Name: HMS Thetis
- Namesake: Thetis
- Builder: Devonport Dockyard
- Laid down: 29 August 1870
- Launched: 26 October 1871
- Completed: 1 February 1873
- Fate: Sold for scrap, November 1887

General characteristics (as built)
- Class & type: Briton-class wooden screw corvette
- Displacement: 1,854 long tons (1,884 t)
- Tons burthen: 1,322 bm
- Length: 220 ft (67.1 m) (p/p)
- Beam: 36 ft (11.0 m)
- Draught: 16 ft 6 in (5.0 m)
- Depth of hold: 21 ft 6 in (6.6 m)
- Installed power: 2,275 ihp (1,696 kW)
- Propulsion: 1 × shaft; 1 × 2-cylinder compound expansion steam engine; 6 × cylindrical boilers
- Sail plan: Ship rig
- Speed: 13 knots (24 km/h; 15 mph)
- Complement: 220
- Armament: 14 × 6.3-inch 64-pounder rifled muzzle-loading guns

HMS Thetis was a Briton-class wooden screw corvette built for the Royal Navy in the late 1860s.

== History ==
Thetis was driven ashore in 1874 whilst on duty in the East Indies. It was reported that she would be repaired at Bombay, India or Trincomalee, Ceylon. On 10 March 1879, she was damaged by fire at Keyham, Devon. The fire was caused by improper storage of materials on board which spontaneously combusted. Damage amounted to £4,000 worth of stores lost and £1,000 worth to the ship. She was present at the Bay of Pisagua when Chilean troops captured the port on 2 November 1879, during the Tarapaca Campaign.

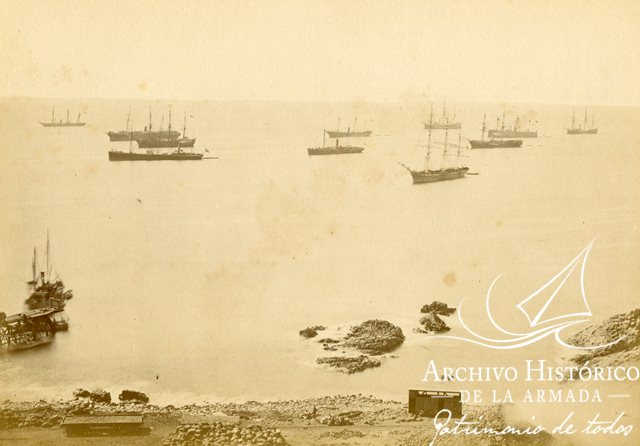
Chilean Navy ships, Covadonga, Almirante Cochrane, Angamos, Amazonas, and HMS Thetis in Pisagua, 1879

== Bibliography ==
- Ballard, G. A. (1938). "British Corvettes of 1875: The Larger Ram-Bowed Type". Mariner's Mirror. 24 (January). Cambridge, UK: Society for Nautical Research: 81–94.
- Chesneau, Roger; Kolesnik, Eugene M., eds. (1979). Conway's All the World's Fighting Ships 1860-1905. Greenwich, UK: Conway Maritime Press. ISBN 0-8317-0302-4.
- Lyon, David & Winfield, Rif (2004). The Sail and Steam Navy List: All the Ships of the Royal Navy 1815–1889. Chatham Publishing. ISBN 978-1-86176-032-6. OCLC 52620555.
