= HMS Dragon (1878) =

British naval vessel

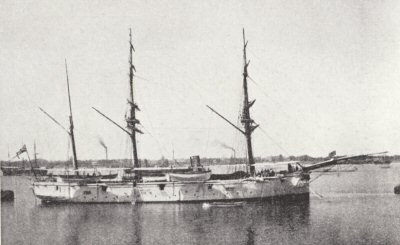
- Dragon in white paint for service in the East Indies

History

United Kingdom
- Name: HMS Dragon
- Builder: Devonport Royal Dockyard
- Cost: Hull £36,427, machinery £13,069
- Laid down: 26 April 1877
- Launched: 30 May 1878
- Commissioned: 19 February 1879
- Fate: Sold on 24 September 1892 for breaking

General characteristics
- Class & type: Doterel-class sloop
- Displacement: 1,130 tons
- Length: 170 ft (52 m) pp
- Beam: 36 ft (11 m)
- Draught: 15 ft 9 in (4.80 m)
- Installed power: 1,006 ihp (750 kW)
- Propulsion: 3 x cylindrical boilers; 2-cylinder horizontal compound-expansion steam engine; Single screw
- Sail plan: Barque rigged
- Speed: 11 1/2 knots (21.3 km/h)
- Range: 1,480 nmi (2,740 km) at 10 kn (19 km/h) from 150 tons of coal
- Complement: 140–150
- Armament: 2 x 7-inch (90cwt) muzzle-loading rifles; 4 x 64-pounder muzzle-loading rifles; 4 x machine guns; 1 x light gun

HMS Dragon was a Doterel-class sloop of the Royal Navy, built at Devonport Dockyard and launched on 30 May 1878. She served in the East Indies, including the Anglo-Egyptian War of 1882, and the suppression of slavery. She was sold for breaking in 1892.

== Design ==
The Doterel class was designed by Nathaniel Barnaby as a development of William Henry White's 1874 Osprey-class sloop. The graceful clipper bow of the Ospreys was replaced by a vertical stem and the engines were more powerful. The hull was of composite construction, with wooden planks over an iron frame.

=== Propulsion ===
Power was provided by three cylindrical boilers, which supplied steam at 60 pounds per square inch (410 kPa) to a two-cylinder horizontal compound-expansion steam engine driving a single 13-foot-1-inch (3.99 m) screw. This arrangement produced 1,006 indicated horsepower (750 kW) and a top speed of 11 1/2 knots (21.3 km/h).

=== Armament ===
Ships of the class were armed with two 7-inch (90 cwt) muzzle-loading rifled guns on pivoting mounts, and four 64-pounder muzzle-loading rifled guns (two on pivoting mounts, and two broadside). Four machine guns and one light gun completed the weaponry.

=== Sail plan ===
All the ships of the class were provided with a barque rig, that is, square-rigged foremast and mainmast, and fore-and-aft sails only on the mizzen mast.

=== Crew ===
Dragon would have had a normal complement of 140–150 men.

== Construction ==
Dragon was ordered from Devonport Dockyard and laid down on 26 April 1877. She was launched on 30 May 1878 and was commissioned on 19 February 1879.

== Service ==
Having commissioned she made passage to the East Indies Station. She took part in the Egyptian War in 1882 under the command of Edward Grey Hulton, landing a naval brigade at Suez. She was accompanied by the Euryalus, along with a complement of soldiers from the 72 (Seaforth) Highlanders. The naval brigade occupied the town, the Egyptian troops fled, and the burning of the town, which had been feared, was averted. In 1884 and 1885 she worked to suppress slavery in the Persian Gulf and east coast of Africa. By 1890 she had returned to Devonport.

== Fate ==
She was sold for breaking on 24 September 1892.

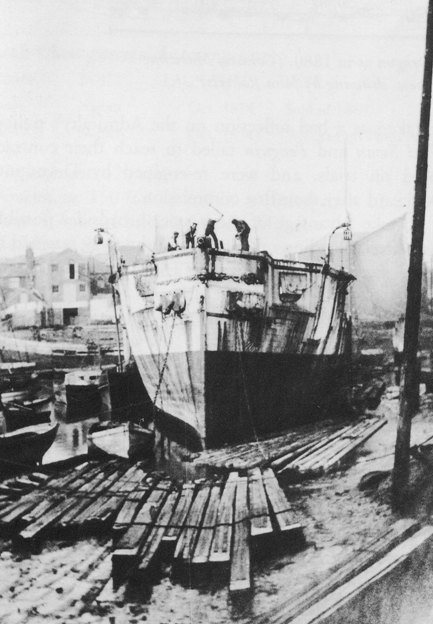
Dragon being broken up
