= HMS Miranda (1879) =

Sloop of the Royal Navy

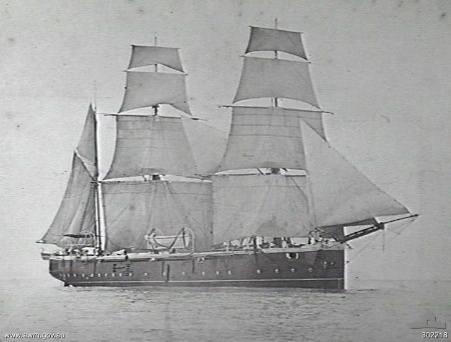
- HMS Miranda c. 1884.

History

United Kingdom
- Name: HMS Miranda
- Builder: Devonport Royal Dockyard
- Cost: Hull £37,000, machinery £11,700
- Laid down: 8 July 1878
- Launched: 30 September 1879
- Commissioned: 22 July 1880
- Fate: Surveying vessel, 1880; Sold on 24 September 1892 to Reed, Portsmouth for breaking

General characteristics
- Class & type: Doterel-class sloop
- Displacement: 1,130 tons
- Length: 170 ft (52 m) pp
- Beam: 36 ft (11 m)
- Draught: 15 ft 9 in (4.80 m)
- Installed power: 1,020 ihp (760 kW)
- Propulsion: 3 × cylindrical boilers; 2-cylinder horizontal compound-expansion steam engine; Single screw
- Sail plan: Barque rigged
- Speed: 11 knots (20 km/h)
- Range: 1,480 nmi (2,740 km) at 10 kn (19 km/h) from 150 tons of coal
- Complement: 140–150
- Armament: 2 × 7-inch (90cwt) muzzle-loading rifles; 4 × 64-pounder muzzle-loading rifles; 4 × machine guns; 1 × light gun

HMS Miranda was a Doterel-class sloop of the Royal Navy, built at Devonport Dockyard and launched on 30 September 1879.

This class of ship was part of the transition of royal navy ships from sail to steam propulsion. A single screw was mounted in a frame that was raised when the ship was under full sail, which reduced the drag effect of the screw. It's coal burning boilers were vented through a telescopic funnel, which was lowered when the ship was under sail, so as not to interfere with the sails; hence the royal navy order ‘up funnel, down screw’.

== Design ==
The Doterel class was designed by Nathaniel Barnaby as a development of William Henry White's 1874 Osprey-class sloop. The graceful clipper bow of the Ospreys was replaced by a vertical stem and the engines were more powerful. The hull was of composite construction, with wooden planks over an iron frame.

=== Propulsion ===
Power was provided by three cylindrical boilers, which supplied steam at 60 pounds per square inch (410 kPa) to a two-cylinder horizontal compound-expansion steam engine driving a single 13-foot-1-inch (3.99 m) screw. This arrangement produced 1,020 indicated horsepower (760 kW) and a top speed of 11 knots (20 km/h).

=== Armament ===
Ships of the class were armed with two 7-inch (90 cwt) muzzle-loading rifled guns on pivoting mounts, and four 64-pounder muzzle-loading rifled guns (two on pivoting mounts, and two broadside). Four machine guns and one light gun completed the weaponry.

=== Sail plan ===
All the ships of the class were provided with a barque rig, that is, square-rigged foremast and mainmast, and fore-and-aft sails only on the mizzen mast.

=== Crew ===
Miranda would have had a normal complement of 140–150 men.

== Construction ==
Miranda was ordered from Devonport Dockyard and laid down on 8 July 1878. She was launched on 30 September 1879 and was commissioned on 22 July 1880.

== Service ==
She commenced service on the Australia Station in March 1881, under Captain R. S. Dawson In May 1883, Commander Dyke Acland received command of the ship. The Miranda visited a number of the Ellice Islands (present-day Tuvalu) in 1886. Captain Rooke was in command when Miranda visited a number of the Gilbert Islands in 1886.

She left the Australia Station in 1886 and returned to England. By 1891, because of her slow speed and obsolete armament, she had been relegated to the Medway Reserve. She was surveyed as a potential training ship in 1892, but found unfit.

== Fate ==
She was sold to Reed of Portsmouth for breaking up on 24 September 1892.
