= HMS Phoenix (1879) =

Sloop of the Royal Navy

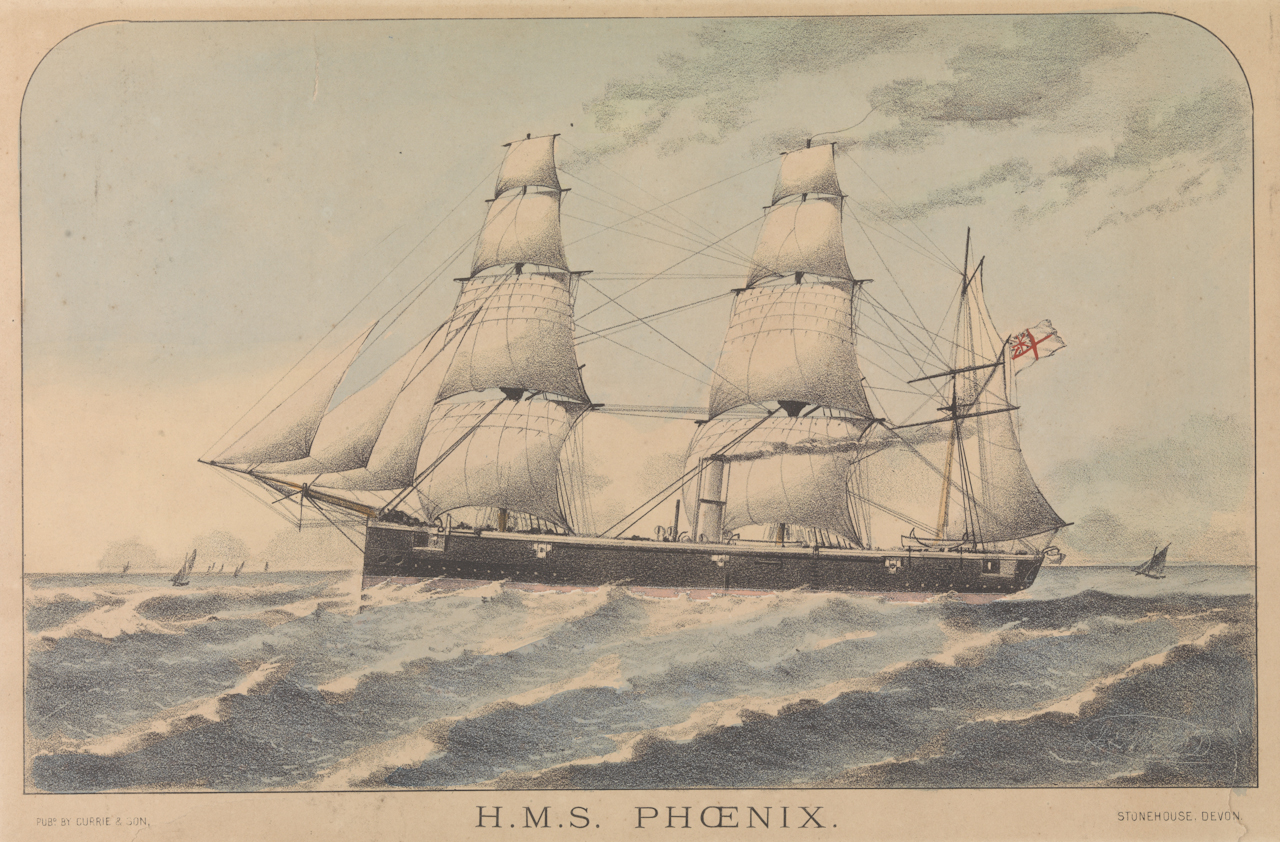
- Phoenix

History

United Kingdom
- Name: HMS Phoenix
- Operator: Royal Navy
- Builder: Devonport Dockyard
- Laid down: 8 July 1878
- Launched: 16 September 1879
- Commissioned: 20 April 1880
- Fate: Wrecked, 12 September 1882

General characteristics
- Class & type: Doterel-class sloop
- Displacement: 1,130 tons
- Length: 170 ft (52 m) pp
- Beam: 36 ft (11 m)
- Draught: 15 ft 9 in (4.80 m)
- Installed power: 1,128 ihp (841 kW)
- Propulsion: 3 × cylindrical boilers; 2-cylinder horizontal compound-expansion steam engine; Single screw
- Sail plan: Barque rigged
- Speed: 11 1/2 knots (21.3 km/h)
- Range: 1,480 nmi (2,740 km) at 10 kn (19 km/h) from 150 tons of coal
- Crew: 155
- Armament: 2 × 7-inch (90cwt) muzzle-loading rifles; 4 × 64-pounder muzzle-loading rifles; 4 × machine guns; 1 × light gun

East Point, Prince Edward Island

HMS Phoenix was a Doterel-class sloop launched in 1879. She was wrecked off Prince Edward Island, Canada on 12 September 1882.

== Design ==
The Doterel class was designed by Nathaniel Barnaby as a development of William Henry White's 1874 Osprey-class sloop. The graceful clipper bow of the Ospreys was replaced by a vertical stem and the engines were more powerful. The hull was of composite construction, with wooden planks over an iron frame.

=== Propulsion ===
Power was provided by three cylindrical boilers, which supplied steam at 60 pounds per square inch (410 kPa) to a two-cylinder horizontal compound-expansion steam engine driving a single 13-foot-1-inch (3.99 m) screw. This arrangement produced 1,128 indicated horsepower (841 kW) and a top speed of 11 1/2 knots (21.3 km/h).

=== Armament ===
Ships of the class were armed with two 7-inch (90 cwt) muzzle-loading rifled guns on pivoting mounts, and four 64-pounder muzzle-loading rifled guns (two on pivoting mounts, and two broadside). Four machine guns and one light gun completed the weaponry.

=== Sail plan ===
All the ships of the class were provided with a barque rig, that is, square-rigged foremast and mainmast, and fore-and-aft sails only on the mizzen mast.

=== Crew ===
Phoenix would have had a normal complement of 140–150 men.

== Construction ==
Phoenix was ordered from Devonport Dockyard and laid down on 8 July 1878. She was launched on 16 September 1879 and commissioned on 20 April 1880.

== Service ==
Sloops of her type were designed for patrolling Britain's extensive maritime empire, and were normally sent to foreign stations for extended periods. Typically the crews would serve commissions of several years before handing their ship over to a newly arrived crew and returning home in another ship. Phoenix was sent to the North America and West Indies Station.

== Wreck ==
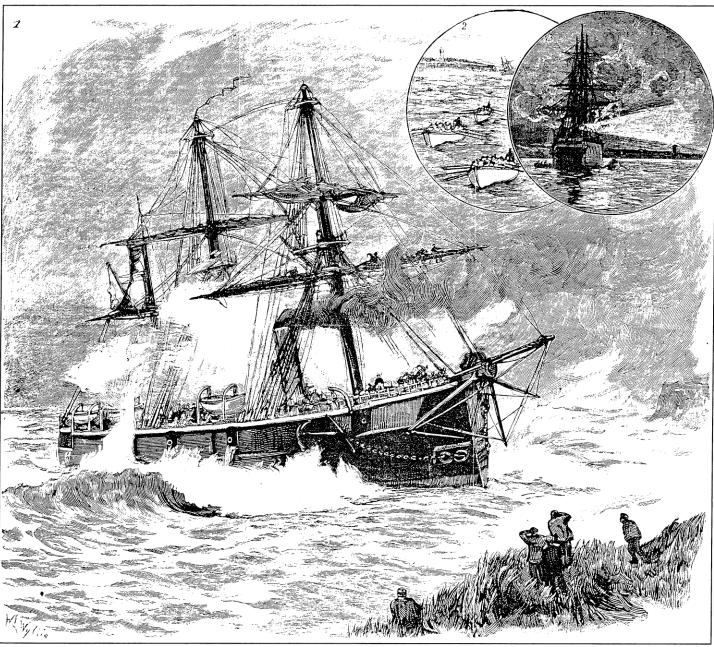
The wreck of Phoenix at East Point, Prince Edward Island

Phoenix left Gaspé, Quebec on the morning of 12 September 1882 under the command of Commander Hubert Grenfell. In company with Northampton, she was on her way to Canso, Nova Scotia. The wind was a north-east gale and the sea was thick with rain squalls. As she approached East Point from the north-west, under short sail and in the dark, the distance to East Point Light was judged to be 4 or 5 miles. In fact, the distance was deceptive, and with the tidal stream carrying the ship towards East Point at as much as 6 knots (11 km/h), the ship was swept onto the East Point Reef in an approximate position of 46°28.5′N 61°58′W.

The water-tight doors were immediately closed, and all hands were summoned to save ship. The sailors worked calmly and without confusion. As she was bumping heavily on the reef steam was got up, when suddenly the sternpost was smashed, and the screw propeller dropped into the sea. There upon the captain ordered part of the men to construct a raft, the remainder being engaged on pumping, as sea had by this time forced its way through the bottom, and flooded the engine-room and cabins.

— The Graphic, London, 21 October 1882

The whole of 13 September was spent trying to save the ship, but the sea was too rough for boats to travel between the ship and the land. By 14 September 4 local fishermen were able to take a boat to Phoenix, which by now was sitting upright on the reef and flooded to the deck. Grenfell ordered the boats and rafts to make for the shore, and everybody on board was landed safely.

Northampton was recalled by telegram from Halifax and brought with her Rear Admiral Sir Francis Leopold McClintock, the commander-in-chief of the North America and West Indies Station. The weather remained poor, and it was not until 19 September that the ship's company of Phoenix could be embarked. With the help of two small vessels, Foam and Charger, Phoenix's guns and heavy equipment were salvaged, but it was clear that the ship could not be refloated, and the salvage rights to the wreck were sold for £3,000.

The board of enquiry found that insufficient efforts had been made to establish the range of the light, and that the courses steered had been hazardous. Commander Grenfell was given a severe reprimand and dismissed ship, (Note: Grenfell was an acknowledged gunnery expert and invented an illuminated sight for firing naval guns at night. He was eventually promoted to captain and retired in 1887.) Lieutenant John Hill, the navigating officer, forfeited a year's seniority, and the gunner was reprimanded.

However, many believed that the real cause of the misfortune was that naval charts showed the East Point Lighthouse to be located on the point, even though it had been built about half a mile away. In 1885, the lighthouse was moved to within 200 feet of the edge of the point.

By December 1883 there were only a few ribs to be seen at low water, and the scattered remains of the wreck now lie in less than 30 feet (9.1 m) of water. The wreck can be dived, although strong tidal streams make the area dangerous for all but the most experienced.

== Sources ==
- Lyon, David & Winfield, Rif (2004). The Sail and Steam Navy List: All the Ships of the Royal Navy 1815–1889. Chatham Publishing. ISBN 978-1-86176-032-6. OCLC 52620555.
- Preston, Antony; Major, John (2007). Send a Gunboat: The Victorian Navy and Supremacy at Sea, 1854–1904 (2nd ed.). London: Conway. ISBN 978-0-85177-923-2.
- "Phoenix at the Naval Database website". Archived from the original on 2 April 2012.
