= HMS Kingfisher (1879) =

Sloop of the Royal Navy

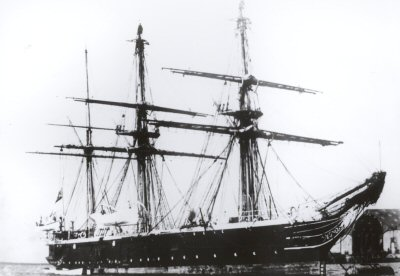
- HMS Kingfisher

History

United Kingdom
- Name: HMS Kingfisher
- Builder: Sheerness Royal Dockyard
- Cost: Hull £39,300, machinery £11,850
- Laid down: 23 September 1878
- Launched: 16 December 1879
- Commissioned: 17 August 1880
- Fate: Training ship 1892; Renamed Lark; Renamed Cruizer 1893; Sold 1919

General characteristics
- Class & type: Doterel-class screw composite sloop
- Displacement: 1,130 tons
- Length: 170 ft (52 m)
- Beam: 36 ft (11 m)
- Draught: 15 ft 9 in (4.80 m)
- Installed power: 1,090 indicated horsepower
- Propulsion: Two-cylinder horizontal compound-expansion steam engine; 3 × cylindrical boilers; 1 × 13 ft 1 in (3.99 m) screw
- Sail plan: Barque rigged
- Speed: 11.6 kn (21.5 km/h)
- Range: 1,480 nmi (2,740 km) at 10 kn (19 km/h)
- Complement: 140
- Armament: 2 × 7-inch (90cwt) muzzle-loading rifled guns; 4 × 64-pounder guns; 4 × machine guns; 1 × light gun

HMS Kingfisher was a Doterel-class screw sloop of the Royal Navy. She was built at Sheerness Dockyard and launched on 16 December 1879. She conducted anti-slavery work in the East Indies in the late 1880s before being re-roled as a training cruiser, being renamed HMS Lark on 10 November 1892, and then HMS Cruizer (Note: Sometimes written Cruiser.) on 18 May 1893. She was sold in 1919.

== Design ==
The Doterel class were a development of the Osprey-class sloops and were of composite construction, with wooden hulls over an iron frame. The original 1874 design by the Chief Constructor, William Henry White was revised in 1877 by Sir Nathaniel Barnaby and nine were ordered. Of 1,130 tons displacement and approximately 1,100 indicated horsepower, they were capable of approximately 11 knots and were armed with two 7-inch muzzle loading rifled guns on pivoting mounts, and four 64-pound guns (two on pivoting mounts, and two broadside). They had a complement of approximately 140 men.

== Construction ==
Kingfisher was laid down at Sheerness Royal Dockyard in 1878 and launched on 16 December 1879. She was commissioned on 17 August 1880, and was classified as both a sloop of war and as a colonial cruiser. She was capable of attaining nearly 12 knots (22 km/h) under full steam or 15 knots under sail.

== History ==
The primary purpose of ships of the Kingfisher' class was to maintain British naval dominance through trade protection, anti-slavery, and long-term surveying.

=== Anti slavery in the East Indies ===
Kingfisher served on the East Indies and Pacific Stations. She recommissioned at Bombay on 8 Apr 1888. Much of her time was spent conducting anti-slavery patrols out of Zanzibar.

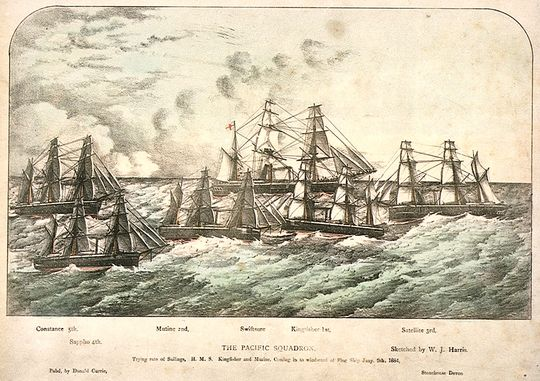
The Pacific Squadron. Trying rate of sailings, H.M.S. Kingfisher and Mutine coming in to windward of Flag Ship, 9 January 1884

=== Training ship ===
She was re-classified as a training ship on 10 November 1892, being renamed Lark. She was renamed Cruizer on 18 May 1893.

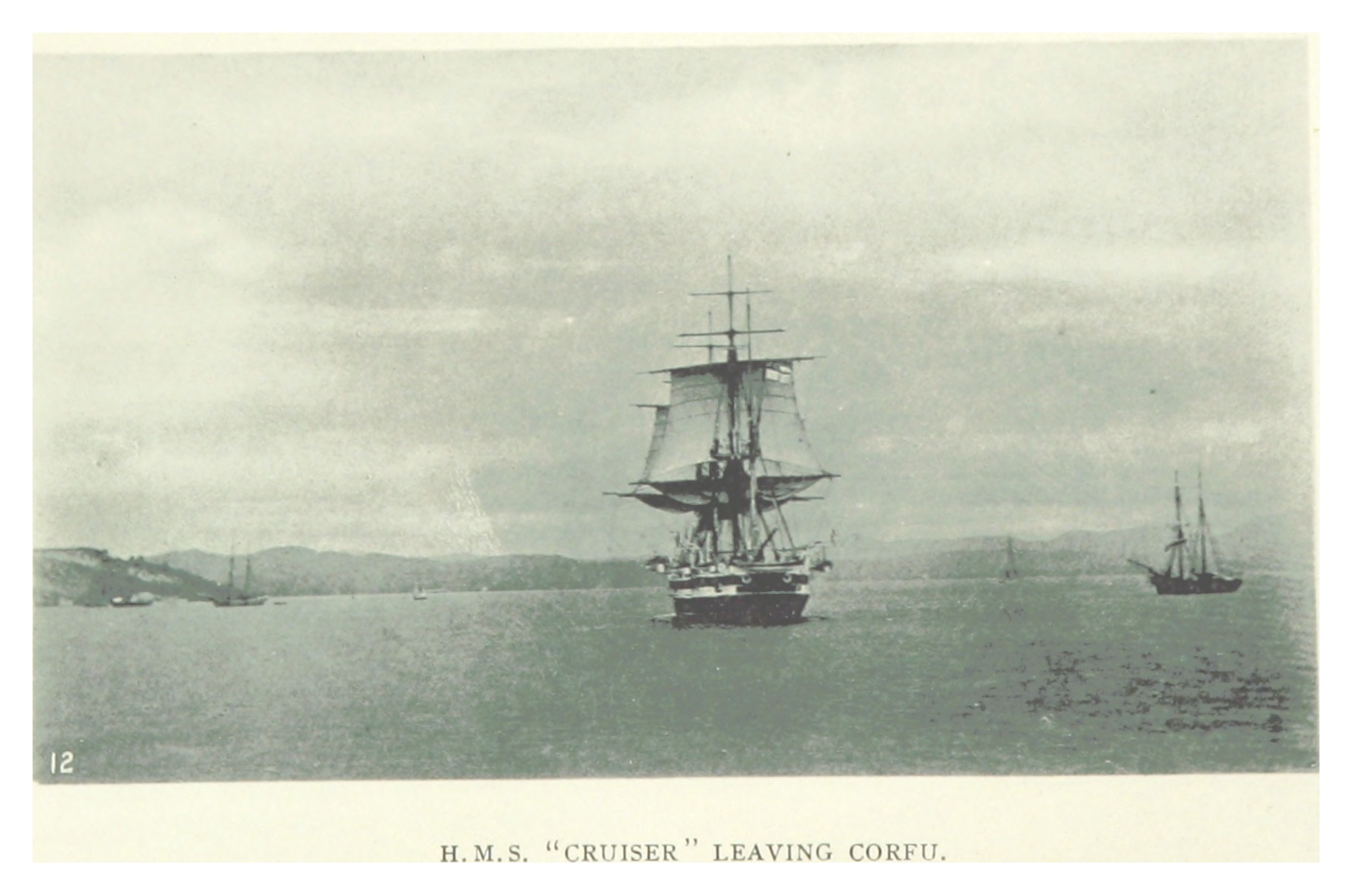
HMS Cruiser (training ship) at Corfu October 1895

In June 1902 she served in the Mediterranean under the command of Commander Francis William Kennedy. In 1913, she was serving as an accommodation ship at Malta.

== Fate ==
She was sold in 1919.
