= Doterel-class sloop =

Royal Navy class of screw-driven sloops

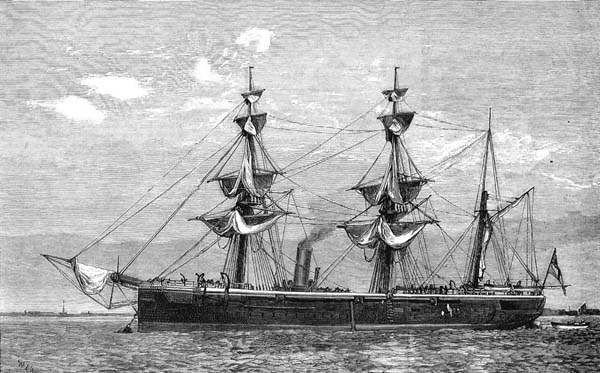
- HMS Doterel

Class overview
- Name: Doterel-class sloop
- Operators: Royal Navy
- Cost: Between £48,700 (Miranda) and £52470 (Gannet)
- Built: 1878–1880
- In commission: 1879–1921
- Completed: 9
- Lost: 2
- Preserved: 1 (Gannet)

General characteristics
- Type: Screw composite sloop
- Displacement: 1,130 tons
- Length: 170 ft (52 m) pp
- Beam: 36 ft (11 m)
- Draught: 15 ft 9 in (4.80 m)
- Installed power: 900 to 1,128 indicated horsepower (671 to 841 kW)
- Propulsion: 3 × cylindrical boilers; 2-cylinder horizontal compound-expansion steam engine; Single screw
- Sail plan: Barque rigged
- Speed: 11 1/2 knots (21.3 km/h)
- Range: 1,480 nmi (2,740 km) at 10 kn (19 km/h) from 150 tons of coal
- Complement: 140-150
- Armament: 2 × 7-inch (90cwt) muzzle-loading rifles; 4 × 64-pounder muzzle-loading rifles; 4 × machine guns; 1 × light gun

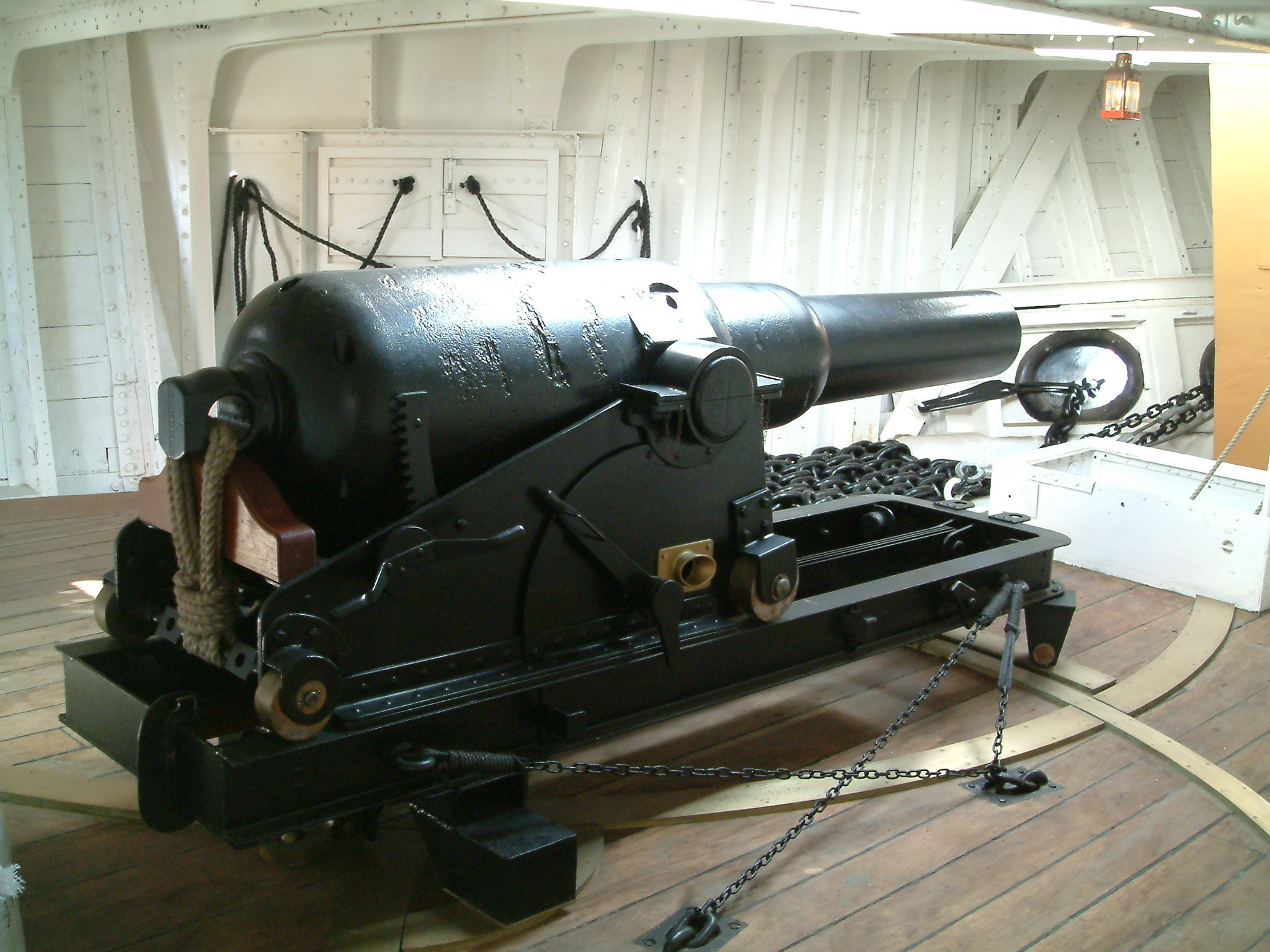
A rifled muzzle loader in the forecastle of Gannet

The Doterel class was a Royal Navy class of screw-driven sloops. They were of composite construction, with wooden hulls over an iron frame. They were a revised version of an 1874 design by the Royal Navy's Chief Constructor, William Henry White, the Osprey-class sloop. Two of the class were lost, one to an explosion off Chile and one wrecked off Canada. Gannet is preserved at Chatham Historic Dockyard.

== Design ==
The Nathaniel Barnaby design was a development of William Henry White's 1874 Osprey-class sloop. The graceful clipper bow of the Opsreys was replaced by a vertical stem and the engines were more powerful. They were of composite construction, with wooden hulls over an iron frame.

=== Propulsion ===
Power was provided by three cylindrical boilers, which supplied steam at 60 pounds per square inch (410 kPa) to a two-cylinder horizontal compound-expansion steam engine driving a single 13-foot-1-inch (3.99 m) screw. This arrangement produced 900 to 1,128 indicated horsepower (671 to 841 kW) and a top speed of between 11 and 11.6 knots (20.4 and 21.5 km/h).

=== Armament ===
They were armed with two 7-inch (90cwt) muzzle-loading rifled guns on pivoting mounts, and four 64-pounder muzzle-loading rifled guns (two on pivoting mounts, and two broadside). Four machine guns and one light gun completed the weaponry.

=== Sail plan ===
All the ships of the class were provided with a barque rig, that is, square-rigged foremast and mainmast, and fore-and aft sails only on the mizzen mast.

=== Crew ===
They had a complement of approximately 140 men.

== Ships ==
Name	Ship Builder	Laid down	Launched	Commissioned	Fate
Dragon	Devonport Dockyard	26 April 1877	30 May 1878	19 February 1879	Sold for breaking 24 September 1892
Pegasus	Devonport Dockyard	9 May 1877	13 June 1878	5 March 1879	Sold for breaking 11 August 1892
Gannet	Sheerness Dockyard	1877	31 August 1878	17 April 1879	Training ship 16 May 1903, renamed President, then in 1913 became training ship Mercury. In 1971 was turned over to the Maritime Trust, on display in Chatham Historic Dockyard
Phoenix	Devonport Dockyard	8 July 1878	16 September 1879	20 April 1880	Wrecked off Prince Edward Island, Canada on 12 September 1882
Miranda	Devonport Dockyard	8 July 1878	30 September 1879	22 July 1880	Sold for breaking 24 September 1892
Kingfisher	Sheerness Dockyard	23 September 1878	16 December 1879	17 August 1880	Training ship 10 November 1892, renamed Lark, then on 18 May 1893 training ship Cruiser. Sold in 1919
Doterel	Chatham Dockyard	13 May 1878	2 March 1880	7 December 1880	Exploded by accident and sank off Punta Arenas, Chile on 26 April 1881, with loss of 143 men
Mutine	Devonport Dockyard	7 June 1879	20 July 1880	10 May 1881	Became boom defence vessel 1899, renamed HMS Azov in March 1904. Sold for breaking 25 August 1921
Espiegle	Devonport Dockyard	23 September 1879	3 August 1880	11 October 1881	Became boom defence vessel 1899, renamed HMS Argo in March 1904. Sold for breaking 25 August 1921
