= HMS Espiegle (1880) =

Sloop of the Royal Navy

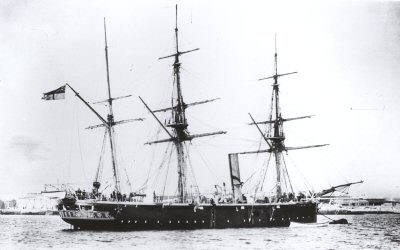
- Espiegle moored to a buoy

History

United Kingdom
- Name: HMS Espiegle
- Builder: Devonport Dockyard
- Cost: Hull £37,500, machinery £11,770
- Laid down: 23 September 1879
- Launched: 3 August 1880
- Commissioned: 11 October 1881
- Fate: Boom defence vessel, 1899; Renamed Argo, 1904; Sold to W. Thorpe on 25 August 1921.

General characteristics
- Class & type: Doterel-class sloop
- Displacement: 1,130 tons
- Length: 170 ft (52 m) pp
- Beam: 36 ft (11 m)
- Draught: 15 ft 9 in (4.80 m)
- Installed power: 1,140 ihp (850 kW)
- Propulsion: 3 × cylindrical boilers; 2-cylinder horizontal compound-expansion steam engine; Single screw
- Sail plan: Barque rigged
- Speed: 11 1/2 knots (21.3 km/h)
- Range: 1,480 nmi (2,740 km) at 10 kn (19 km/h) from 150 tons of coal
- Complement: 140–150
- Armament: 2 × 7-inch (90cwt) muzzle-loading rifles; 4 × 64-pounder muzzle-loading rifles; 4 × machine guns; 1 × light gun

HMS Espiegle was a Doterel-class sloop of the Royal Navy, built at the Devonport Dockyard and launched on 3 August 1880.

== Design ==
The Doterel class was designed by Nathaniel Barnaby as a development of William Henry White's 1874 Osprey-class sloop. The graceful clipper bow of the Ospreys was replaced by a vertical stem and the engines were more powerful. The hull was of composite construction, with wooden planks over an iron frame.

=== Propulsion ===
Power was provided by three cylindrical boilers, which supplied steam at 60 pounds per square inch (410 kPa) to a two-cylinder horizontal compound-expansion steam engine driving a single 13-foot-1-inch (3.99 m) screw. This arrangement produced 1,020 indicated horsepower (760 kW) and a top speed of 11 knots (20 km/h).

=== Armament ===
Ships of the class were armed with two 7-inch (90cwt) muzzle-loading rifled guns on pivoting mounts, and four 64-pounder muzzle-loading rifled guns (two on pivoting mounts, and two broadside). Four machine guns and one light gun completed the weaponry.

=== Sail plan ===
All the ships of the class were provided with a barque rig, that is, square-rigged foremast and mainmast, and fore-and-aft sails only on the mizzen mast.

=== Crew ===
Espiegle would have had a normal complement of 140–150 men.

== Construction ==
Espiegle was ordered from Devonport Dockyard and laid down on 23 September 1879. She was launched on 3 August 1880 and was commissioned on 11 October 1881 at Devonport.

== Service ==
She commenced service on the Australia Station in November 1881. She left the Australia Station in March 1885 and went to the China Station. She assisted during the Chilean Revolt in 1891. She was fitted out as a boom defence vessel in 1899 and stationed at Southampton; she was renamed Argo in 1902.

== Fate ==
She was sold to W. Thorpe for breaking on 25 August 1921.

== Bibliography ==
- Bastock, John (1988), Ships on the Australia Station, Child & Associates Publishing Pty Ltd; Frenchs Forest, Australia. ISBN 0-86777-348-0
- Dodson, Aidan (2026). "The Cadet Training Ships of the Royal Navy". In Jordan, John (ed.). Warship 2026. Osprey Publishing. pp. 156–174. ISBN 978-1-4728-7259-3.
- Lyon, David & Winfield, Rif (2004). The Sail and Steam Navy List: All the Ships of the Royal Navy 1815–1889. Chatham Publishing. ISBN 978-1-86176-032-6. OCLC 52620555.
