= HMS Mutine (1880) =

Sloop of the Royal Navy

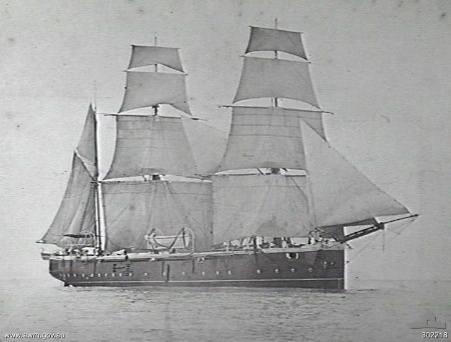
- Sister-ship Miranda under sail

History

United Kingdom
- Name: HMS Mutine
- Builder: Devonport Dockyard
- Cost: Hull £37,500, machinery £11,770
- Laid down: 7 June 1879
- Launched: 20 July 1880
- Commissioned: 10 May 1881
- Fate: Boom defence vessel, 1899; Renamed Azov in March 1904; Sold for breaking 25 August 1921

General characteristics
- Class & type: Doterel-class sloop
- Displacement: 1,130 tons
- Length: 170 ft (52 m) pp
- Beam: 36 ft (11 m)
- Draught: 15 ft 9 in (4.80 m)
- Installed power: 1,120 ihp (840 kW)
- Propulsion: 3 × cylindrical boilers; 2-cylinder horizontal compound-expansion steam engine; Single screw
- Sail plan: Barque rigged
- Speed: 11.6 knots (21.5 km/h)
- Range: 1,480 nmi (2,740 km) at 10 kn (19 km/h) from 150 tons of coal
- Complement: 140–150
- Armament: 2 × 7-inch (90cwt) muzzle-loading rifles; 4 × 64-pounder muzzle-loading rifles; 4 × machine guns; 1 × light gun

HMS Mutine was a Doterel-class sloop of the Royal Navy, built at the Devonport Dockyard and launched on 20 July 1880. She became a boom defence vessel at Southampton in 1899 and was renamed Azov in 1904. She was sold after World War I.

== Design ==
The Doterel class was designed by Nathaniel Barnaby as a development of William Henry White's 1874 Osprey-class sloop. The graceful clipper bow of the Ospreys was replaced by a vertical stem and the engines were more powerful. The hull was of composite construction, with wooden planks over an iron frame.

=== Propulsion ===
Power was provided by three cylindrical boilers, which supplied steam at 60 pounds per square inch (410 kPa) to a two-cylinder horizontal compound-expansion steam engine driving a single 13-foot-1-inch (3.99 m) screw. This arrangement produced 1,020 indicated horsepower (760 kW) and a top speed of 11 knots (20 km/h).

=== Armament ===
Ships of the class were armed with two 7-inch (90 cwt) muzzle-loading rifled guns on pivoting mounts, and four 64-pounder muzzle-loading rifled guns (two on pivoting mounts, and two broadside). Four machine guns and one light gun completed the weaponry.

=== Sail plan ===
All the ships of the class were provided with a barque rig, that is, square-rigged foremast and mainmast, and fore-and-aft sails only on the mizzen mast.

=== Crew ===
Mutine would have had a normal complement of 140–150 men.

== Construction ==
Mutine was ordered from Devonport Dockyard and laid down on 7 June 1879. She was launched on 20 July 1880 and was commissioned on 10 May 1881 at Devonport.

== Service ==
Sloops of the 1880s and beyond were built to an outmoded design specifically to act as guardians of Britain's far-flung maritime empire; their sailing rig gave them enormous range, and their armament was more than sufficient for minor conflicts around the globe. Mutine was assigned to the Pacific Station, including service in China.

In 1904 Admiral John Fisher (amid great controversy) listed over 90 ships for disposal. Among those listed as "ships available for subsidiary purposes of war" (Note: "Ships available for subsidiary purposes of war" were the so called "llamas"; those for sale were the "goats" and those for disposal the "sheep") was Mutine. Converted to a boom defence vessel in 1899, she and her sister Espiegle were assigned to the boom protecting Southampton Water. Mutine was renamed Azov in March 1904 (Espiegle became Argo at the same time). They worked throughout World War I in this role.

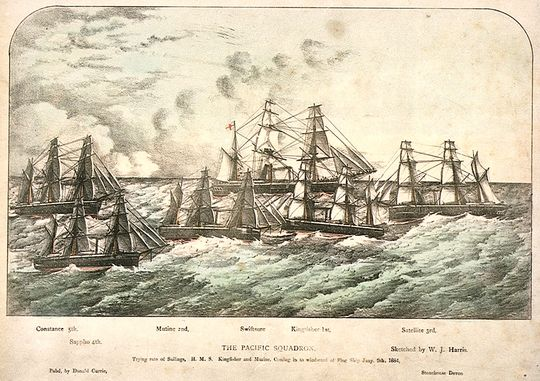
The Pacific Squadron. Trying rate of sailings, H.M.S. Kingfisher and Mutine coming in to windward of Flag Ship, 9 January 1884

== Fate ==
Azov (ex-Mutine) was sold to C A Beard for breaking on 25 August 1921.
