= HMS Pegasus (1878) =

Royal ship in 1878

- Pegasus anchored at Port Hamilton

History

United Kingdom
- Name: HMS Pegasus
- Builder: Devonport Royal Dockyard
- Cost: Hull £36,697, machinery £12,809
- Laid down: 9 May 1877
- Launched: 13 June 1878
- Commissioned: 5 March 1879
- Fate: Sold on 11 August 1892

General characteristics
- Class & type: Doterel-class screw composite sloop
- Displacement: 1,130 tons
- Length: 170 ft (52 m)
- Beam: 36 ft (11 m)
- Draught: 15 ft 9 in (4.80 m)
- Installed power: 972 indicated horsepower
- Propulsion: Two-cylinder horizontal compound-expansion steam engine; Three cylindrical boilers; Single 13 ft 1 in (3.99 m) screw
- Sail plan: Barque rigged
- Speed: 11.4 kn (21.1 km/h)
- Range: 1,480 nmi (2,740 km) at 10 kn (19 km/h)
- Complement: 140
- Armament: Two 7-inch (90cwt) muzzle-loading rifled guns; Four 64-pound guns; Four machine guns; One light gun

HMS Pegasus was a Doterel-class screw composite 6-gun sloop launched on 13 June 1878. She was sold for scrap in 1892.

== Design ==
The Doterel class were a development of the Osprey-class sloops and were of composite construction, with wooden hulls over an iron frame. The original 1874 design by the Chief Constructor, William Henry White was revised in 1877 by Sir Nathaniel Barnaby and nine were ordered. Of 1,130 tons displacement and approximately 1,100 indicated horsepower, they were capable of approximately 11 knots and were armed with two 7" muzzle loading rifled guns on pivoting mounts, and four 64-pound guns (two on pivoting mounts, and two broadside). They had a crew complement of approximately 140 men.

== Construction ==
Pegasus was laid down at Devonport Royal Dockyard in 1877 and launched on 13 June 1878. She was commissioned on 5 March 1879, and was classified as both a sloop of war and as a colonial cruiser. She was capable of attaining 11.4 kn (21.1 km/h) under full steam or 15 knots under sail.

== Service history ==
The primary purpose of ships of her class was to maintain British naval dominance through trade protection, anti-slavery, and long term surveying. Pegasus served on the China Station.

=== Occupation of Port Hamilton ===
With a view to forestalling Russian intentions, on 16 April 1885 Pegasus, Agamemnon and Firebrand occupied Port Hamilton, a small group of islands in the Jeju Strait off the southern coast of the Korean Peninsula. The base was demolished and the occupation ended on 27 February 1887 after the Russian threat had diminished.

== Fate ==
Pegasus was sold to George Cohen for breaking on 11 August 1892.
