= Campbell Tait =

Royal Navy admiral

Admiral Sir Campbell Tait KCB MVO
- by Edward Roworth
- Born: 12 August 1886; Morice Town, Devon, England
- Died: 17 July 1946 (aged 59); Salisbury, Southern Rhodesia
- Spouse: Katie Cynthia Grenfell (1894–1962)
- Military career
- Allegiance: United Kingdom
- Branch: Royal Navy
- Service years: 1902–1945
- Rank: Admiral
- Commands: HMS Dragon; HMS Capetown; HMS Delhi; HMS Shropshire; Africa Station; South Atlantic Station
- Conflicts: World War I World War II
- Awards: Knight Commander of the Order of the Bath; Member of the Royal Victorian Order; Order of Orange-Nassau

Admiral Sir William Eric Campbell Tait KCB MVO (12 August 1886 – 17 July 1946) was a senior British naval officer, courtier and the fifth Governor of Southern Rhodesia after his naval retirement in 1944, serving from 1945 to 1946.

He commanded various cruisers between 1928 and 1937. He became Commander-in-Chief, South Atlantic in 1942.

== Naval career ==
Born in Morice Town, Devon to Deputy Surgeon-General and author, William Tait, and his wife Emma, Tait entered the Britannia Royal Naval College in Dartmouth in 1902. Following his graduation, Tait became a career naval officer, serving in the Pacific, Atlantic, Mediterranean and China. He became a friend of the royal household of King George V, serving as a mentor to his two oldest sons, the future kings Edward VIII and George VI.

After serving in World War I, during which he was made a Member of the Royal Victorian Order (MVO), Tait married Katie Grenfell, daughter of Captain Hubert Grenfell, inventor of illuminated night sights for naval guns, on 3 November 1919. They had two daughters. Under the name Cynthia Tait (1894–1962) his wife became a well-known botanical illustrator, particularly of South African flowers.

Tait was promoted to Commander in 1921 and Captain in 1926, gaining his first command in 1928 as Commanding Officer of HMS Dragon. There followed commands of HMS Capetown and HMS Delhi before service as Deputy Director of Naval Intelligence before returning to the sea as Commanding Officer of HMS Shropshire.

Made Rear Admiral, Tait was Naval Aide-de-camp to King George VI in 1938, a Companion of the Order of the Bath (CB) in 1940 and Vice Admiral in 1941. before becoming Commodore of the principal naval depot at Portsmouth. It was in this position that Tait was recognised for the smooth mobilisation of the fleet at outbreak of World War II. After serving as Director of Personal Services at the Admiralty, Tait served as Commander-in-Chief, South Atlantic from 1942, and in this capacity, he established and headed a Combined Headquarters in Cape Town, where he led the Royal Navy, South African Army and South African Air Force, which was considered an important factor in maintaining allied domination around the Cape.

Tait was made a Knight Commander of the Order of the Bath (KCB) in 1943 and a Grand Officer of the Order of Orange-Nassau 1945 and was appointed Governor of Southern Rhodesia on 20 February 1945. Tait's tenure as Governor proved to be fleeting as, ailing for some time, Tait relinquished the Governorship in February 1946 after twelve months and died at Government House, Salisbury, five months later, less than a month before his 60th birthday.

There is an Admiral Tait Primary School in Harare, Zimbabwe, named in honour of Tait.

Military offices
Preceded by Sir Algernon Willis	Commander-in-Chief, South Atlantic Station; 1942–1944	Succeeded by Sir Robert Burnett
Government offices
Preceded by Robert James Hudson	Governor of Southern Rhodesia; 1945–46	Succeeded by Fraser Russell
