= Cynthia Tait =

South African botanist

- Born: Kate Cynthia Grenfell; 1894
- Died: 1962 (aged 67–68)
- Citizenship: South Africa
- Occupation: Botanist
- Father: Hubert Henry Grenfell

Leucadendron laureolum (Lam.) Fourc. (= L. decorum R.Br.)

Lady Cynthia Tait (1894–1962), born Kate Cynthia Grenfell, was a proficient botanical illustrator, particularly of Southern African flowers. She was married to Admiral Sir William Eric Campbell Tait and during his prolonged absences found ample time to become interested in and paint wild flowers. After Campbell Tait's death in 1946 she was married to Lancelot Herbert Ussher of Luncarty, Claremont, Cape, South Africa.

She was the daughter of Capt. Hubert Henry Grenfell RN (1845–1906), an expert in naval gunnery and the inventor of several improvements in that field, and Eleanor Kate Cunningham (1852–1932). Tait's siblings were Florence Grenfell, Captain Francis Henry Grenfell, Huberta Grenfell, Agnes Margery Grenfell, Captain Russell Grenfell and Paula Stella Grenfell.

She and Campbell Tait had daughters who attended Blanchelande College in Guernsey, where she stayed on occasion when her husband was posted to the Far East.

She also spent time in South Africa, and in Rhodesia when her husband was governor there. Her paintings were inherited by her granddaughter, Cynthia Cormack, who only recently disclosed their whereabouts. A book on these paintings was published in 2018 – 'The Tait Florilegium' (Gateway Publishing Ltd).
