= Doris Ison =

Doris Ison, born Doris Louise Taylor (abt. June 13, 1908 – August 29, 1989) was an activist for healthcare access for people of color in Miami-Dade County, Florida. She is best known for her work establishing the Community Health of South Dade Inc. in 1971, at the time called Martin Luther King Jr. Clinica Campesina, where she served on the board. This clinic later became known the Doris Ison Center of Community Health of South Florida Inc (CHI).

Ison advocated for increased health care for uninsured, low-income Black Americans and Mexican migrant agriculture workers at a time when hospitals in the area excluded these populations. CHI continues to provide primary, behavioral, and school-based health services across over thirty schools in Miami-Dade.

== Early life ==
Ison was born in 1908 in Nassau, Bahamas. Her family left the Bahamas when Doris was about three years old and moved to Florida City in Dade County Florida. She as the oldest of six children. She did not have the option to attend school, as schools in the area did not welcome Black children at the time, so she worked harvesting beans and tomatoes.

Her mother died when from an intestinal flu when she was a teenager.

She married Nathaniel Barnaby on April 14, 1934 in Barnaby, Florida. They divorced in 1946, with no known children.

== Career ==
Ison's activist work on community health in Miami-Dade County and the CHI led to increased access to healthcare for low-income populations, including people of color.

Ison worked in collaboration with Dr. Lynn Carmichaeel to develop the initial nonprofit healthcare center in 1971.

In 1974, Ison spoke with the U.S. Senate's Special Committee on Aging to advocate for greater transportation to and from medical appointments for elderly patients. She later met with Senator Ted Kennedy during his visit to CHI in 1977 to discuss the development of new health center in the Miami-Dade area.

== Later years ==
Ison became a naturalized citizen of the United States in 1953, and married her second husband, Olian Ison, in Dade, Florida.

She died on August 29, 1989.
