= List of shipwrecks in April 1880 =

The list of shipwrecks in April 1880 includes ships sunk, foundered, grounded, or otherwise lost during April 1880.

== 1 April ==
List of shipwrecks: 1 April 1880
Ship	State	Description
Ada	United Kingdom	The ship was driven ashore at Breskens, Zeeland, Netherlands.
Aduale	France	The ship ran aground at Fort Mahon, Pas-de-Calais. She was on a voyage from Saint-Malo, Ille-et-Vilaine to Gothenburg, Sweden.
Blackwall	United Kingdom	The barque was damaged by fire in the West India Docks, London.
Ella	United Kingdom	The steamship ran aground at Leith, Lothian. She was on a voyage from Libava, Courland Governorate to Leith. She was refloated.

== 2 April ==
List of shipwrecks: 2 April 1880
Ship	State	Description
Arabistan	Netherlands	The schooner was abandoned in the North Sea. Her eight crew were rescued by the schooner Marie (Norway). Arabistan was on a voyage from Sunderland, County Durham, United Kingdom to Memel, Germany. She was towed in to Hull, Yorkshire, United Kingdom by a fishing smack.
Herundo	Norway	The barque was wrecked on Rathlin Island, County Antrim, United Kingdom. Her crew were rescued. She was on a voyage from Porsgrund to Barrow-in-Furness, Lancashire, United Kingdom.
Marie	Norway	The barque was abandoned in the Atlantic Ocean. Her crew were rescued by the steamship Trinacria (United Kingdom). Marie was discovered by the barque One (United Kingdom), which put a prize crew aboard.
Othere	United Kingdom	The barque was abandoned in the North Sea. Her crew took to a boat; they were rescued the next day by North Riding (United Kingdom). Othere was on a voyage from Middlesbrough, Yorkshire to Philadelphia, Pennsylvania, United States.
Réunion	France	The fishing vessel was wrecked on the coast of Iceland. Her crew survived.
Yakasago	Japan	The steamship was driven ashore 7 nautical miles (13 km) from Wusong, China.

== 4 April ==
List of shipwrecks: 4 April 1880
Ship	State	Description
August	United Kingdom	The ship ran aground on the Longsand, in the North Sea off the coast of Essex. She was on a voyage from Philadelphia, Pennsylvania, United States to King's Lynn, Norfolk. She was refloated and resumed her voyage.
Barbara Young	United Kingdom	The sloop was driven ashore at Lindisfarne, Northumberland and sank. Her crew were rescued. She was on a voyage from Amble to Lindisfarne.
Douglas	United Kingdom	The barque was stranded on Pecks Beach opposite Life Saving Station No. 31, 4th District, on the New Jersey coast. Her ten crew were rescued by the United States Life Saving Service. She was on a voyage from Santos, Brazil to New York, United States. She was a total loss.
Horsa	Denmark	The steamship was driven ashore and wrecked at Lista, Norway. Her crew were rescued by the steamship Diamond (United Kingdom). Horsa was on a voyage from Aarhus to Newcastle upon Tyne, Northumberland.
Jessie	United Kingdom	The schooner was abandoned in the Baltic Sea. Her crew were rescued by the schooner Arovna (Norway).
Newbiggin	United Kingdom	The steamship ran aground on the Atherfield Ledge, off the Isle of Wight and was wrecked. She was on a voyage from Odesa, Russia to Dunkirk, Nord, France.
Stelling	United Kingdom	The steamship was driven ashore at Chilton Chine, Isle of Wight. She was on a voyage from Bilbao, Spain to Middlesbrough, Yorkshire. She was refloated and resumed her voyage.
Syria	United Kingdom	The steamship was abandoned in the Atlantic Ocean. Her crew were rescued by the steamship Gellert (Germany). Syria was on a voyage from New Orleans, Louisiana, United States to Liverpool, Lancashire.

== 5 April ==
List of shipwrecks: 5 April 1880
Ship	State	Description
Brennus	United Kingdom	The steamship ran aground in the Schuylkill River. She was on a voyage from Rio Marina, Elba, Italy to Philadelphia, Pennsylvania, United States.
Fortuna	Germany	The ship struck a rock near Soggendal, Norway and sank. Her crew were rescued. She was on a voyage from Grangemouth, Stirlingshire, United Kingdom to Flensburg.
Klara	Norway	The ship foundered at sea. Her crew survived. She was on a voyage from an English port to Halmstad, Sweden.
Louise Auguste	Germany	The brig was wrecked at Thisted, Denmark. Her crew were rescued. She was on a voyage from Memel to Newcastle upon Tyne, Northumberland, United Kingdom.
Marcio	Flag unknown	The steamship ran aground in the Suez Canal. She had been refloated by 8 April.
Mayfield	United Kingdom	The ship ran aground at Pernambuco, Brazil. She was on a voyage from Paraíba, Brazil to Liverpool, Lancashire. She was refloated and resumed her voyage.
Midas	United Kingdom	The barque was driven ashore at Marseille, Bouches-du-Rhône, France. Her crew were rescued. She was on a voyage from Marseille to Cádiz, Spain.
Ralph Howes	United States	The schooner stranded 200 feet (61 m) off Long Island, New York, 1/2 nautical mile (0.93 km) west of Life Saving Station No. 11, 3rd District. Her crew six were rescued by the United States Life Saving Service. She was a total loss.
R. E. A. Parkinson	United Kingdom	The full-rigged ship was driven ashore at Marseille. She was on a voyage from Marseille to Gibraltar.
Reindeer	United Kingdom	The ketch collided with the barque Resolution (Norway) and sank in the River Thames.
Superbo Recchese	Italy	The barque was driven ashore on Diamond Island, Burma.
Wyberton	United Kingdom	The steamship was driven ashore on Purmerend Island, off Sumatra, Netherlands East Indies. She was on a voyage from Rotterdam, South Holland, Netherlands to Java, Netherlands East Indies. Wyberton was refloated on 11 April.

== 6 April ==
List of shipwrecks: 6 April 1880
Ship	State	Description
Caroline	Germany	The schooner was wrecked at "Qualben Jeddern", Norway. She was on a voyage from Schiedam, South Holland, Netherlands to Stettin.
Coro	Denmark	The schooner was driven ashore and wrecked at Thisted. She was on a voyage from Trelleborg, Sweden to Stockton-on-Tees, County Durham, United Kingdom.
Marie	Norway	The barque, which had a prize crew aboard, was abandoned in the Atlantic Ocean (46°40′N 20°25′W). The crew were rescued by Birnam Wood (United Kingdom).
Nicholas	United States	The schooner was driven ashore and wrecked on Elainia Island, Department of Alaska.
Zoe	United Kingdom	The steamship was driven ashore at Koll, Sweden and was severely damaged. She was on a voyage from South Shields, County Durham to Saint Petersburg, Russia. Zoe was refloated on 9 April and taken in to Copenhagen, Denmark for repairs.

== 7 April ==
List of shipwrecks: 7 April 1880
Ship	State	Description
Elizabeth	Netherlands	The kuff sank in the North Sea. Her crew survived. She was on a voyage from Delfzijl, Groningen to Kragerø, Norway.
Helene	Germany	The galiot collided with the barque Orvar Odd (Norway and sank. Two of her crew were rescued.
Margaret	United Kingdom	The schooner was driven ashore in the Larne Lough.
Nordstjernen	Sweden	The ship was driven ashore on Whalsay, Shetland Islands, United Kingdom. Her crew were rescued. She was on a voyage from Hull, Yorkshire, United Kingdom to Visby.

== 8 April ==
List of shipwrecks: 8 April 1880
Ship	State	Description
Angelica	United Kingdom	The barque ran aground at Sunderland, County Durham. She was on a voyage from Lossiemouth, Moray to Sunderland. She was refloated.
Antelope	United Kingdom	The steamship was driven ashore on Terschelling, Friesland, Netherlands. She was on a voyage from Sweden to Cardiff, Glamorgan.
830	France	The fishing vessel ran aground on the Kentish Knock and was abandoned. Her crew were rescued by the smack Alice and Fred (United Kingdom).

== 9 April ==
List of shipwrecks: 9 April 1880
Ship	State	Description
Barita	United Kingdom	The steamship collided with the steamship Flora (Austria-Hungary) and sank 5 nautical miles (9.3 km) downstream from Galaţi, United Principalities with the loss of sixteen or the 34 people on board. Survivors were rescued by Flora. Barita was on a voyage from London to Galaţi.
Emma	United Kingdom	The Mersey Flat was run into by the steamship Delambre (United Kingdom) and sank at Liverpool, Lancashire.
George William	United Kingdom	The fishing smack sank off Terschelling, Friesland, Netherlands.
Joseph Brown	United Kingdom	The ship was sighted whilst on a voyage from Sunderland, County Durham to East London, Cape Colony. No further trace,. reported missing.
Lady Lawrence	United Kingdom	The ship ran aground on the Romer Shoal. She was on a voyage from New York, United States to Liverpool. She was refloated and put back to New York.
Rival	United Kingdom	The schooner was driven ashore at Cromer, Norfolk. She was on a voyage from Newcastle upon Tyne, Northumberland to Northfleet, Kent.
Valborg	Norway	The brig ran aground on the Lemon and Ower Sand, in the North Sea. She was on a voyage from Bremen, Germany to Baltimore, Maryland, United States. She was refloated and found to be severely leaky. Valborg was towed in to Ramsgate, Kent, United Kingdom by a tug.

== 10 April ==
List of shipwrecks: 10 April 1880
Ship	State	Description
Elizabeth Emily	Germany	The barque foundered in the North Sea. Her crew were rescued by Susanna (Norway). Elizabeth Emily was on a voyage from Newcastle upon Tyne, Northumberland, United Kingdom to Gunnebo, Sweden.
Mary Garret	United States	The scow was in danger of serious damage by pounding on a pier in a gale at New River on Lake Huron 4 nautical miles (7.4 km) from Life Saving Station No. 2, 10th District, and was scuttled to prevent destruction. Later raised.
Queen of England	United Kingdom	The ship departed from Port Glasgow, Renfrewshire for Quebec City, Canada. No further trace, reported missing, presumed foundered off the mouth of the Saint Lawrence River with the loss of all 30 people on board.
Scandinavia	United Kingdom	The steamship collided with the steamship Thiorva (Flag unknown) at New York, United States. Scandinavia was on a voyage from New York to Bristol, Gloucestershire. She put back to New York in a severely leaky condition.
Spring Flower	United Kingdom	The brig was driven ashore at Thisted, Denmark. She was on a voyage from Newcastle upon Tyne, Northumberland to Stockholm, Sweden. She was refloated and resumed her voyage.
Token	United Kingdom	The ship ran aground in the River Mersey near New Brighton, Cheshire. She was on a voyage from Runcorn, Cheshire to Antwerp, Belgium. She was refloated and put back to Runcorn in a leaky condition.

== 11 April ==
List of shipwrecks: 11 April 1880
Ship	State	Description
Betty	Norway	The brig ran aground on the Haisborough Sands, on the North Sea off the coast of Norfolk, United Kingdom. Her eight crew were rescued by the lifeboat British Workman ( Royal National Lifeboat Institution). Betty was on a voyage from Fredrikshald to Honfleur, Manche. She was refloated with assistance from British Worksman and a yawl and beached on the coast of Norfolk in a wrecked condition.
Charles E. Scammell	United Kingdom	The schooner collided with Sjofroken (Flag unknown) at Faial Island, Azores and was severely damaged.
David Andrews	Canada	The schooner stranded 6 nautical miles (11 km) east of Oswego, New York, United States. Her seven crew were rescued by the United States Life Saving Service. She was a total loss.
H. Galmar	Norway	The brig collided with the full-rigged ship Firth of Clyde (United Kingdom) and sank in the English Channel off Beachy Head, Sussex, United Kingdom with the loss of five of her nine crew.
Jessie	United Kingdom	The barge struck a sunken pile and sank at Portsmouth, Hampshire. She was refloated and placed under repair.
Nicolo Tommasseo	Austria-Hungary	The barque was struck by lightning in the Strait of Gibraltar. She caught fire and sank off Europa Point, Gibraltar. Her crew were rescued by a barque. She was on a voyage from Philadelphia, Pennsylvania, United States to Trieste.

== 12 April ==
List of shipwrecks: 12 April 1880
Ship	State	Description
Activ	Denmark	The steamship struck the wreck of the steamship Sportsman (United Kingdom) and sank at Bergen, Norway. Activ was on a voyage from Königsberg, Germany to Bergen.
Alnwick Castle	United Kingdom	The steamship caught fire in the Lühe and was scuttled. She was on a voyage from Hamburg, Germany to Chile. She was severely damaged.
Elizabeth	United Kingdom	The schooner was abandoned in the North Sea. Her crew were rescued. She was on a voyage from Saint Davids, Pembrokeshire to Königsberg, Germany.
Rush	United Kingdom	The schooner ran aground and sank at Dingle Point. She was on a voyage from Runcorn, Cheshire to Dundalk, County Louth.
Sea Belle	South Australia	The ship was driven ashore at Port Alfred, Cape Colony. She was on a voyage from Port Alfred to Adelaide. She was consequently condemned.
Unnamed	Flag unknown	The steamship was destroyed by fire 15 nautical miles (28 km) from Málaga, Spain. Her crew were rescued by a barque.

== 13 April ==
List of shipwrecks: 13 April 1880
Ship	State	Description
Ann Elizabeth	United Kingdom	The ship was wrecked on the Eastern Spit, in the Opobo River.
Eota	Germany	The brig was driven ashore at Gibraltar. She was on a voyage from Marseille, Bouches-du-Rhône, France to Hamburg.
Hjalman	Norway	The brig collided with Falls of Clyde (United Kingdom) in the English Channel off the Royal Sovereign Lightship ( Trinity House) and was abandoned. Her crew were rescued by Falls of Clyde and a brig.
Khedive	United Kingdom	The steamship caught fire at Malta. She was on a voyage from Calcutta, India to London. The fire was extinguished.

== 14 April ==
List of shipwrecks: 14 April 1880
Ship	State	Description			
Amathea	Norway	The barque was abandoned in the Atlantic Ocean. HAll sixteen people on board were rescued by the steamship Chilian (United Kingdom). Amathea was on a voyage from Gloucester, United Kingdom to New York, United States.			
Ariel	Norway	The schooner was abandoned in the North Sea. Her crew were rescued by the smack Hopeful (United Kingdom). Ariel was on a voyage from Blyth, Northumberland, United Kingdom to Christiania.			
Calypso	United Kingdom	The steamship was run into by the steamship Hawk (United Kingdom) and sank in the Thames Estuary 12 nautical miles (22 km) off Margate, Kent. Her crew and 47 passengers were saved. Calypso was on a voyage from Dunedin, New Zealand to London			
Carlo K.	Austria-Hungary	The barque foundered in the Atlantic Ocean (46°19′N 19°45′W). Her crew were rescued by the barque Angiolotta (Italy). Carlo K. was on a voyage from New York to Bristol, Gloucestershire, United Kingdom.			
Elizabeth	Netherlands	The kuff foundered at sea. Her crew were rescued. {{shipwreck list item	ship=Fawn	flag=United Kingdom	desc=The tug was run into and sunk by the steamship Cherbourg (United Kingdom) in Southampton Water, off Netley Hospital, [[Hampshir/ref> }}
Eota	Germany	The brig was driven ashore at Gibraltar. She was on a voyage from Marseille, Bouches-du-Rhône, France to Hamburg.e]] with the loss of a crew member. Survivors were rescued by Cherbourg. Fawn was refloated in late April and taken in to Northam, Hampshire in a severely damaged condition.			
G. W. Wakeford	Canada	The brigantine was abandoned at sea. Her crew were rescued. She was on a voyage from Cádiz, Spain to Prince Edward Island.			
Martino Maria	United Kingdom	The barque ran aground on the Kankens Shoal, in the Mediterranean Sea. She was on a voyage from Sfax, Beylik of Tunis to Kincardine.			
Z. G. Simmons	United States	The schooner collided with a scow off the entrance to the harbor at Manistee, Michigan. She was towed up the river off Life Saving Station No. 5, 11th district where she sank. She was refloated on 17 April.			
Unnamed	Flag unknown	The schooner ran aground on the Hoyle Bank, in Liverpool Bay.			

== 15 April ==
List of shipwrecks: 15 April 1880
Ship	State	Description
Criss Grover	United States	The schooner struck a shoal and was wrecked in a snowstorm 1 nautical mile (1.9 km) south of the mouth of the Au Sable River. Her eleven crew were rescued on 16 April by the United States Life Saving Service and volunteers. During the rescue the line-throwing cannon exploded killing the Deputy Collector of Customs of Au Sable, Michigan and wounding two others. She was a total loss.
George Washington	Germany	The schooner was discovered derelict in the Shetland Islands, United Kingdom. She was taken in to Scalloway.

== 16 April ==
List of shipwrecks: 16 April 1880
Ship	State	Description
Cultivator	United States	The ship was abandoned in the Atlantic Ocean (49°35′N 26°00′W). Her 29 crew were rescued by the steamship Victoria (United Kingdom). Cultivator was on a voyage from Liverpool, Lancashire, United Kingdom to Baltimore, Maryland.
Evergreen	United States	The schooner was driven ashore in Lake Michigan on the coast of Wisconsin 1 nautical mile (1.2 mi; 1.9 km) south of the Milwaukee station of the United States Life-Saving Service. Her four crew made it to shore on a line thrown by bystanders. She broke up the next day. Some equipment was salvaged.
Walter B. Allen	United States	Sonar image of the wreck of Walter B. Allen, 12 June 2022. While under tow by the tug Caroline Williams (United States) from the harbor on South Manitou Island in Michigan to Manitowoc, Wisconsin, for repairs and carrying a cargo of corn, the 136-foot (41 m), 296.15-gross register ton two-masted canal schooner sank in Lake Michigan off the coast of Wisconsin in a snowstorm and gale. Caroline Williams rescued her entire crew. The wreck lies in 165 feet (50 m) of water in the Wisconsin Shipwreck Coast National Marine Sanctuary at 43°49.821′N 087°36.522′W with its two masts rising to within 90 feet (27 m) of the surface.

== 17 April ==
List of shipwrecks: 17 April 1880
Ship	State	Description
Acme	United Kingdom	The ship was abandoned in the Atlantic Ocean. Her 21 crew were rescued by Nonatum (United Kingdom). Acme was on a voyage from Bristol, Gloucestershire to Quebec City, Canada.
Aracana	United Kingdom	The schooner was driven ashore at Ross, County Mayo. She was on a voyage from London to Ballina, County Mayo.
Battiste	United Kingdom	The ship departed from Liverpool, Lancashire for Charleston, South Carolina, United States. No further trace, reported overdue.
Floral Star	United Kingdom	The schooner was driven ashore at "Aylen Kay". Her crew were rescued by Pegasus (Royal Navy). Floral Star was on a voyage from Yokohama, Japan to Niuzhuang, China.
Jeune Frederick	France	The ship ran aground, capsized and sank in the River Usk. She was on a voyage from Redon, Ille-et-Vilaine to Newport, Monmouthshire, United Kingdom.

== 18 April ==
List of shipwrecks: 18 April 1880
Ship	State	Description
Bonnie Julienne	France	The ship ran aground on the Pennington Spit, in the Solent. She was on a voyage from Southampton, Hampshire, United Kingdom to Saint-Malo, Ille-et-Vilaine. She was refloated.
Melampus	United Kingdom	The schooner was driven ashore at Moville, County Donegal. She was on a voyage from Londonderry to Irvine, Ayrshire. She was refloated.
Star	United Kingdom	The smack was driven ashore at Moville. She was refloated.

== 19 April ==
List of shipwrecks: 19 April 1880
Ship	State	Description
C. A.	United Kingdom	The schooner ran aground at Port Talbot, Glamorgan. She was on a voyage from Bilbao, Spain to Port Talbot.
Emmanuel	Germany	The galiot was driven ashore and wrecked in Cudden Point, Cornwall, United Kingdom. Her four crew jumped ashore and climbed the cliff to safety. The ship floated off and was washed eastwards to the mouth of Little Harry Sowan where she was wrecked. She was on a voyage from Emden to Quimper, Finistère, France.
Henry	United Kingdom	The ship was driven ashore at Staithes, North Riding of Yorkshire.
Invincible	United Kingdom	The smack struck a sunken wreck and foundered in the North Sea 35 nautical miles (65 km) east north east of Lowestoft, Suffolk. Her crew were rescued by the lugger Reta (United Kingdom).
Rosella	United Kingdom	The barque ran aground of a reef off Guadeloupe and was wrecked. She was on a voyage from Guadeloupe to Saint Thomas, Virgin Islands.
Sea Belle	South Australia	The ship was driven ashore at Port Alfred, Cape Colony. She was consequently condemned.

== 20 April ==
List of shipwrecks: 20 April 1880
Ship	State	Description
Adina	United Kingdom	The ship departed from Glasgow, Renfrewshire for Exeter, Devon. No further trace, reported missing.
Galatea	United Kingdom	The steamship ran aground at Avonmouth, Somerset. She was on a voyage from New York, United States to Bristol, Gloucestershire.

== 21 April ==
List of shipwrecks: 21 April 1880
Ship	State	Description
Alexander Buthie	United Kingdom	The ship sank during a storm with the loss of all six crew.
Andrew Johnson	United States	The full-rigged ship was driven ashore at Bremerhaven, Germany. She was refloated.
Ann	United Kingdom	The ship was driven ashore near Skinburness, Cumberland. She was later refloated.
Concert	United Kingdom	The steam yacht collided with a landing stage at Tranmere, Cheshire. She capsized and sank. Both people on board survived.
Harald Haarfanger	Norway	The barque was driven ashore on Skagen, Denmark. She was on a voyage from Bristol, Gloucestershire, United Kingdom to Kotka, Grand Duchy of Finland. She was refloated the next day and taken in to Fredrikshavn, Denmark.
Isabella	United Kingdom	The fishing vessel sank in the North Sea 7 nautical miles (13 km) north of Fowlsheugh, Kincardineshire during a storm with the loss of all six crew.
Twilight	United Kingdom	The ship capsized with the loss of all four crew.
Yola	United Kingdom	The steamship was lost in the Niger River.
Four unnamed vessels	United Kingdom	Four fishing vessels were lost during a storm, killing nineteen crew.

== 22 April ==
List of shipwrecks: 22 April 1880
Ship	State	Description
Adam	United Kingdom	The ship ran aground at Glenarm, County Antrim and sprang a leak. She was on a voyage from Glenarm to Dublin.
Alexander Duthie	United Kingdom	The yawl foundered in the North Sea 15 nautical miles (28 km) off Stonehaven, Aberdeenshire with the loss of all five crew.
Anna Catharina	Germany	The barque was driven ashore at Cape Arkona. She was on a voyage from Burntisland, Fife, United Kingdom to Swinemünde. She was refloated and taken in to Swinemünde.
Balgownie	United Kingdom	The ship ran aground at Cochin, India. She was on a voyage from Cochin to Tellicherry. She was refloated.
Bet	United Kingdom	The smack was driven ashore and wrecked in Cloughy Bay.
George Arkle	United Kingdom	The barque was driven ashore on "Duivan Island", Netherlands East Indies. She was refloated on 24 April and resumed her voyage.
Iron Cross	United Kingdom	The full-rigged ship was damaged by fire at New Orleans, Louisiana, United States.
Isabella	United Kingdom	The fishing boat foundered in the North Sea off the coast of Aberdeenshire with the loss of all six crew.
Mizpah	United Kingdom	The barque broke from her moorings and ran aground at Waterford. She was refloated with assistance.
Trevor	United Kingdom	The Mersey Flat sank in the River Mersey at Liverpool, Lancashire with the loss of one life.
Twilight	United Kingdom	The fishing vessel capsized in the North Sea off the coast of Kincardineshire with the loss of all four crew.

== 23 April ==
List of shipwrecks: 23 April 1880
Ship	State	Description
Alexandria	(Ottoman Empire) Egypt	The steamship ran aground in the Suez Canal.
RMS American	United Kingdom	The steamship foundered 180 nautical miles (330 km) off Cape Palmas, Canary Islands following the breaking of her propeller shaft. All but seven of her 141 passengers and crew took to the ship's boats. Fifty-four people in three of the boats were rescued by the steamship Congo (United Kingdom). The barque Emma F. Harriman (United States rescued 65 people in three of the other five boats. HMS Firebrand (Royal Navy) was despatched to search for the remaining two boats; Moltke (Germany) rescued those in the gig, leaving a dinghy with five crew on board unacounted for. The dinghy subsequently reached Loanda, Portuguese East Africa. American was on a voyage from Southampton, Hampshire to the Cape of Good Hope, Cape Colony. She was towed in to Loanda on 21 July by the brig Taraja (Portugal), which had rescued seven people in one of the boats.
British Empire	United Kingdom	The ship was severely damaged by fire at Rangoon, Burma.
Hesleden Hall	United Kingdom	The steamship ran aground at Saint-Malo, Ille-et-Vilaine, France and sprang a severe leak. She was on a voyage from Pillau, Germany to Saint-Malo.

== 24 April ==
List of shipwrecks: 24 April 1880
Ship	State	Description
Sapphire	United Kingdom	The steamship struck a submerged object and sank at Leith, Lothian. She was on a voyage from Kirkcaldy, Fife to Leith. She was refloated and drydocked.

== 26 April ==
List of shipwrecks: 26 April 1880
Ship	State	Description
Martha Jane	United Kingdom	The smack ran aground and sank in the Goltrap Roads. She was on a voyage from Porthclais to Little Haven, Pembrokeshire.
Rainbow	United Kingdom	The brig sprang a leak and sank 25 nautical miles (46 km) west north west of Trevose Head, Cornwall. Her crew were rescued by the schooner Philippe Lea (France). Rainbow was on a voyage from Llanelly, Glamorgan to Sheerness, Kent.

== 27 April ==
List of shipwrecks: 27 April 1880
Ship	State	Description
Jylland	Denmark	The steamship ran aground at Villequier, Seine-Inférieure, France. She was on a voyage from Rouen, Seine-Inférieure to Kronstadt, Russia. She was refloated and towed in to Havre de Grâce, Seine-Inférieure in a severely damaged condition.
Thorbjorn	Norway	The brigantine ran aground between Mostyn and Connah's Quay, Flintshire, United Kingdom and was severely damaged. She was on a voyage from Porsgrund to Connah's Quay.

== 28 April ==
List of shipwrecks: 28 April 1880
Ship	State	Description
Ariel, Bispham, and Ezel	United Kingdom	The ships ran aground and collided off Weston Point Docks, Runcorn, Cheshire and were all severely damaged. Ezel was on a voyage from Runcorn to Newcastle upon Tyne, Northumberland.
Nidelven	Norway	The brig ran aground on the Middelgrund. She was on a voyage from Sunderland, County Durham, United Kingdom to Stockholm, Sweden. She was refloated with assistance and resumed her voyage.
Rosaline	United Kingdom	The fishing trawler was driven ashore at Old Castle Point, Isle of Wight. She was refloated and resumed her voyage.

== 29 April ==
List of shipwrecks: 29 April 1880
Ship	State	Description
Farsund	Norway	The barque was wrecked on the Woolpack. Her crew were rescued.
Jumna	India	The flat was destroyed by fire at Calcutta with the loss of four lives.
Progress	United Kingdom	The steamship was destroyed by fire at Calcutta. She was on a voyage from Calcutta to Assam.
United	United Kingdom	The ship was wrecked near the Île-de-Bréhat, Finistère, France. Her crew were rescued.

== 30 April ==
List of shipwrecks: 30 April 1880
Ship	State	Description
Florida	United States	The ship was severely damaged by fire at sea. She was on a voyage from Mobile, Alabama to Falmouth, Cornwall, United Kingdom.
Irene Morris	United Kingdom	The steamship arrived at Reval, Russia from Savannah, Georgia, United States on fire. She was severely damaged before the fire was extinguished.

== Unknown date ==
List of shipwrecks: Unknown date in April 1879
Ship	State	Description
Aardenburg	Netherlands	The full-rigged ship ran aground on the Galloper Sand, in the North Sea. She was on a voyage from Ijmuiden, North Holland to Batavia, Netherlands East Indies. She was refloated and put back to IJmuiden.
Abbie Macadam	United Kingdom	The ship was wrecked in the Bahamas. She was on a voyage from New York, United States to Sagua la Grande, Cuba.
Ada	United Kingdom	The ship was driven ashore near Vlissingen, Zeeland, Netherlands. She was refloated on 5 April with the assistance of two tugs and taken in to Vlissingen.
Adolf Landgren	Sweden	The barque was wrecked at "Santa Ana". Her crew were rescued.
Amalthea	Norway	The barque was abandoned at sea. Her crew were rescued. She was on a voyage from Gloucester, United Kingdom to New York.
Amelia	United Kingdom	The steamship was wrecked on Lacapedes Island, Aden Governorate on or before 8 April. She was on a voyage from the Malabar Coast to London. The wreck was plundered by the islanders. Sixteen crew were rescued at sea by the barque Seaforth (United Kingdom) on 24 April.
Antelope	Norway	The ship capsized and sank at Scarborough, Yorkshire, United Kingdom. She was on a voyage from Christiania to Scarborough. She was refloated.
Arch Druid	United Kingdom	The steamship was driven ashore at "Paz Neuzen", near Vlissingen, Zeeland, Netherlands. She was on a voyage from Alexandria, Egypt to Antwerp, Belgium. She was refloated and towed in to Antwerp.
Artemis	France	The ship was damaged by fire at New York. She was on a voyage from Dunkirk, Nord to New York.
Beta	Germany	The brig ran aground on the Behring Rock. She was on a voyage from Marseille, Bouches-du-Rhône, France to Hamburg.
Blue Jacket	United Kingdom	The smack was driven ashore and wrecked on Inishbofin, County Donegal. She was on a voyage from Ballynass, County Londonderry to Ramelton, County Donegal.
Brantford City	United Kingdom	The steamship sank at Stockton-on-Tees, County Durham. She was being fitted out after launch, and her propeller shaft was dropped whilst it was being loaded aboard, holing her bottom. She was refloated on 22 April.
C. A.	United Kingdom	The schooner ran aground at Port Talbot, Glamoargan. She was on a voyage from Bilbao, Spain to Port Talbot.
Cadzow Forest	United Kingdom	The ship was wrecked on Rodrigues before 22 April. She was on a voyage from Calcutta, India to Demerara, British Guiana.
Carham	United Kingdom	The steamship was driven ashore on the west coast of Inverness-shire.
Chard	United Kingdom	The crew was abandoned in the Atlantic Ocean off the Wolf Rock, Cornwall. Her crew were rescued by the barque Teteus (Norway).
Earl of Devon	United Kingdom	The ship ran aground in the River Usk. She was on a voyage from Newport, Monmouthshire to Valparaíso, Chile.
Elizabeth Jantina	Netherlands	The brig was driven ashore on Skagen, Denmark, She was on a voyage from Memel, Germany to Amsterdam, North Holland.
Elvira	Spain	The barque was driven ashore and wrecked on Madeira with the loss of all hands.
Evangeline	United Kingdom	The ship was abandoned at sea before 23 April. Her crew were rescued. She was on a voyage from Liverpool, Lancashire to New York.
Fauvna	Norway	The ship was driven ashore at "Swanhalla".
Fire Queen	United Kingdom	The steamship was driven ashore at Trelleborg, Sweden. She had been refloated by 27 April and taken in to Copenhagen, Denmark.
Fling	(Dominion of Newfoundland) Newfoundland Colony	The ship was damaged by ice in St. Mary's Bay and was abandoned. Her crew were rescued. She was on a voyage from Porto, Portugal to Newfoundland.
Francesco	Italy	The ship ran aground in the Swash Channel. She was on a voyage from Livorno to New York.
Gwalior	United Kingdom	The barque ran aground on the Middelgrund, in the Baltic Sea. She was on a voyage from Hartlepool, County Durham to Pillau, Germany.
G. W. Ward	United Kingdom	The steamship ran aground in the Suez Canal. She was on a voyage from Newport, Monmouthshire to Bombay, India. She was refloated and completed her voyage in a leaky condition.
Hannah Morris	United Kingdom	The full-rigged ship was driven ashore at Cape Henry, Virginia, United States. She was refloated but sprang a leak and was beached at the mouth of the Elizabeth River. Subsequently refloated and taken in to Norfolk, Virginia.
Harry Bailey	United Kingdom	The ship was driven ashore on Brier Island, Nova Scotia, Canada. She was on a voyage from Saint John, New Brunswick, Canada to Queenstown, County Cork. She was refloated and put back to Saint John in a leaky condition.
Henriette Dorn	Germany	The brig was wrecked at "Santa Ana", or Frontera, Mexico.
Henry	United Kingdom	The ship was driven ashore at Staithes, Yorkshire.
Heron	(Dominion of Newfoundland) Newfoundland Colony	The ship was damaged by ice in St. Mary's Bay and was abandoned. Her crew were rescued. She was on a voyage from Barbados to Saint John's.
Hirundo	United Kingdom	The barque was wrecked on Rathlin Island, County Antrim. Her crew were rescued. She was on a voyage from Porsgrund, Norway to Barrow-in-Furness, Lancashire.
Inca	Germany	The brig was wrecked at "Santa Ana". Her crew were rescued.
Irwell	United Kingdom	The ship was abandoned in the Atlantic Ocean before 3 April.
James Peake	Canada	The ship was abandoned in the Atlantic Ocean. Her crew were rescued. She was on a voyage from Bowling, Dunbartonshire, United Kingdom to Philadelphia, Pennsylvania, United States.
J. L. Cotter	United States	The ship was driven ashore at Cape Henlopen, Delaware. She was on a voyage from Guadeloupe to New York. She was refloated and taken in to Philadelphia in a leaky condition.
Johannes Kraeft	Germany	The brig was driven ashore at Falsterbo, Sweden. She was refloated with assistance and taken in to Copenhagen.
Jonas Risting	Denmark	The barque was wrecked at "Santa Ana". Her crew were rescued.
Juicko van Deen	Netherlands	The ship was driven ashore and wrecked at Cabezo de Playa, Saint Domingo. Her crew were rescued.
Kate	United Kingdom	The barque was severely damaged by fire at New Orleans, Louisiana, United States.
Katie	United States	The ship ran aground at the mouth of the Rio Grande and was severely damaged. She was on a voyage from Richmond, Virginia to the Rio Grande.
Krondprinsesse Louise	Norway	The barque was wrecked on the Colorados, off the coast of Cuba. Her crew were rescued. She was on a voyage from Cardiff to Havana, Cuba.
Laura	Germany	The schooner was run down and sunk by the steamship Rokeby (United Kingdom). Laura was on a voyage from Swinemünde to Schleswig.
Lebanon	United Kingdom	The brig foundered in the Atlantic Ocean. Her sixteen crew were rescued by Mary ( (Dominion of Newfoundland) Newfoundland Colony).
Lora Hurlbert	United States	The ship foundered in the Atlantic Ocean. Her crew were rescued. She was on a voyage from Havana to New York.
Lovetand	Norway	The barque collided with Romsdall (United Kingdom) in the Atlantic Ocean and was abandoned. Her crew were rescued by Romsdall. Lovetand was on a voyage from Messina, Sicily, Italy to New York.
Madras	United Kingdom	The steamship was driven ashore at Fapons Point, Ottoman Empire. She was on a voyage from Nicholaieff, Russia to New York.
Magdeburg	United Kingdom	The ship ran aground at "Gibriani". She was on a voyage from Cardiff to Galaţi, United Principalities. She was refloated and resumed her voyage.
Margaret	United Kingdom	The schooner was driven ashore in the Larne Lough.
Marie	Germany	The ship ran aground in Svanemølle Bay. She was on a voyage from Stralsund to Copenhagen, Denmark.
Martina Marina	United Kingdom	The barque ran aground on the Kankena Shoal, in the Mediterranean Sea. She was on a voyage from Sfax, Algeria to Kincardine, Fife.
Matthew Curtis	United Kingdom	The steamship ran aground in the Delaware River. She was on a voyage from Philadelphia to London. She was refloated.
Melchior	Germany	The ship was driven ashore at Sea Bright, New Jersey, United States. She was on a voyage from Bremerhaven to New York.
Miss Beck	United Kingdom	The ship was driven ashore near Port Dinorwic, Caernarfonshire. She was on a voyage from Caernarfon to Bangor, Caernarfonshire.
Narayana	Norway	The ship was driven ashore at Nidingen, Sweden. She was on a voyage from New York to Helsingør, Denmark. She was refloated on 14 April.
Neva	United Kingdom	The steamship ran aground in the Danube 37 nautical miles (69 km) from Sulina, United Principalities.
Ocean Queen	United Kingdom	The barque was abandoned off Bermuda with the loss of all hands. She was on a voyage from Pensacola, Florida, United States to Belfast, County Antrim.
Orn Brudslond	Flag unknown	The schooner was abandoned at sea before 5 April.
Oscar	United Kingdom	The steamship sank in the River Carron near Grangemouth, Stirlingshire.
Pizzaro	Spain	The steamship struck the pier at Havre de Grâce, Seine-Inférieure, France and sank at the bow. She was on a voyage from Spain to Havre de Grâce.
Pride of the Torridge	United Kingdom	The ship sank in the Scheldt at "Kruisschaus". She was on a voyage from Antwerp to Swansea, Glamorgan.
Problem	United Kingdom	The schooner struck a rock at Ballantrae, Ayrshire and was beached. She was on a voyage from Dublin to Ballantrae and Ayr.
Queen of Ceylon	United Kingdom	The ship was driven ashore at the mouth of the Schuylkill River. She was on a voyage from "Sagita" to Philadelphia.
Sara	Netherlands	The brigantine was wrecked at Aracaju, Brazil.
Sophia Cook	United States	The ship was driven ashore on Dutch Island, Rhode Island and was severely damaged. She was on a voyage from New York to "Rivadasella". She was later refloated with assistance.
Star	United Kingdom	The brig ran aground at Copenhagen, Denmark. She was refloated and resumed her voyage.
Star of Jamaica	United Kingdom	The barque was wrecked on the Folly Reef. She was on a voyage from Barbados to Port Royal, Jamaica.
St. Charles	United States	The ship was destroyed by fire at Hiogo, Japan.
St. Nicholas	United Kingdom	The sloop ran aground at Trouville-sur-Mer, Calvados, France.
Susannah	Netherlands	The ship sank in the North Sea. Her crew were rescued by Osprey (United Kingdom).
Takasago Maru	Japan	The steamship ran aground near Wusong, China. She was later refloated and resumed her voyage.
United Service	United Kingdom	The steamship ran aground at Ochachiv, Russia. She was on a voyage from Nicolaieff, Russia to Gibraltar.
Unity	United Kingdom	The brig was wrecked 40 nautical miles (74 km) from Saint-Malo, Ille-et-Vilaine, France. She was on a voyage from Swansea to Saint-Malo.
Valentine	France	The brig was driven ashore on Martinique.
Virginia	United States	The ship was wrecked in the Bahamas. She was on a voyage from Port-au-Prince, Haiti to Falmouth, Cornwall, United Kingdom.
Viscaino	Flag unknown	The steamship was sunk by ice in the Grand Banks of Newfoundland. Her crew were rescued. She was on a voyage from New Orleans to Antwerp.
Wassenaar	Netherlands	The ship was abandoned in the Atlantic Ocean before 8 April. Her crew were rescued by Annie (Denmark). Wassenaar was on a voyage from Pensacola to Grangemouth.
Zelica	United Kingdom	The ship was driven ashore at Penscacola. She was on a voyage from Pensacola to Greenock, Renfrewshire. She was refloated and resumed her voyage.
Unnamed	Flag unknown	The ship, Code Letters HDNX, was abandoned in the Atlantic Ocean west of Brow Head, County Cork. Some of her crew were rescued by the steamship Victoria (United Kingdom.
Unnamed	Norway	The barque was driven ashore at "Santa Ana", or Frontera. She was refloated.
