= East Point, Prince Edward Island =

Coordinates: 46°27′N 61°58′W

Location of East Point in Prince Edward Island

East Point is a cape and an unincorporated community located at the easternmost extremity of Prince Edward Island, Canada. Its geographic coordinates are 46º27'N, 61º58'W.

It is the dividing point for delineating the eastern limits of the Northumberland Strait. Its shores consist of dramatic high sandstone cliffs. The Canadian Coast Guard maintains a lighthouse as a navigational aid beacon.

== Shipwrecks ==
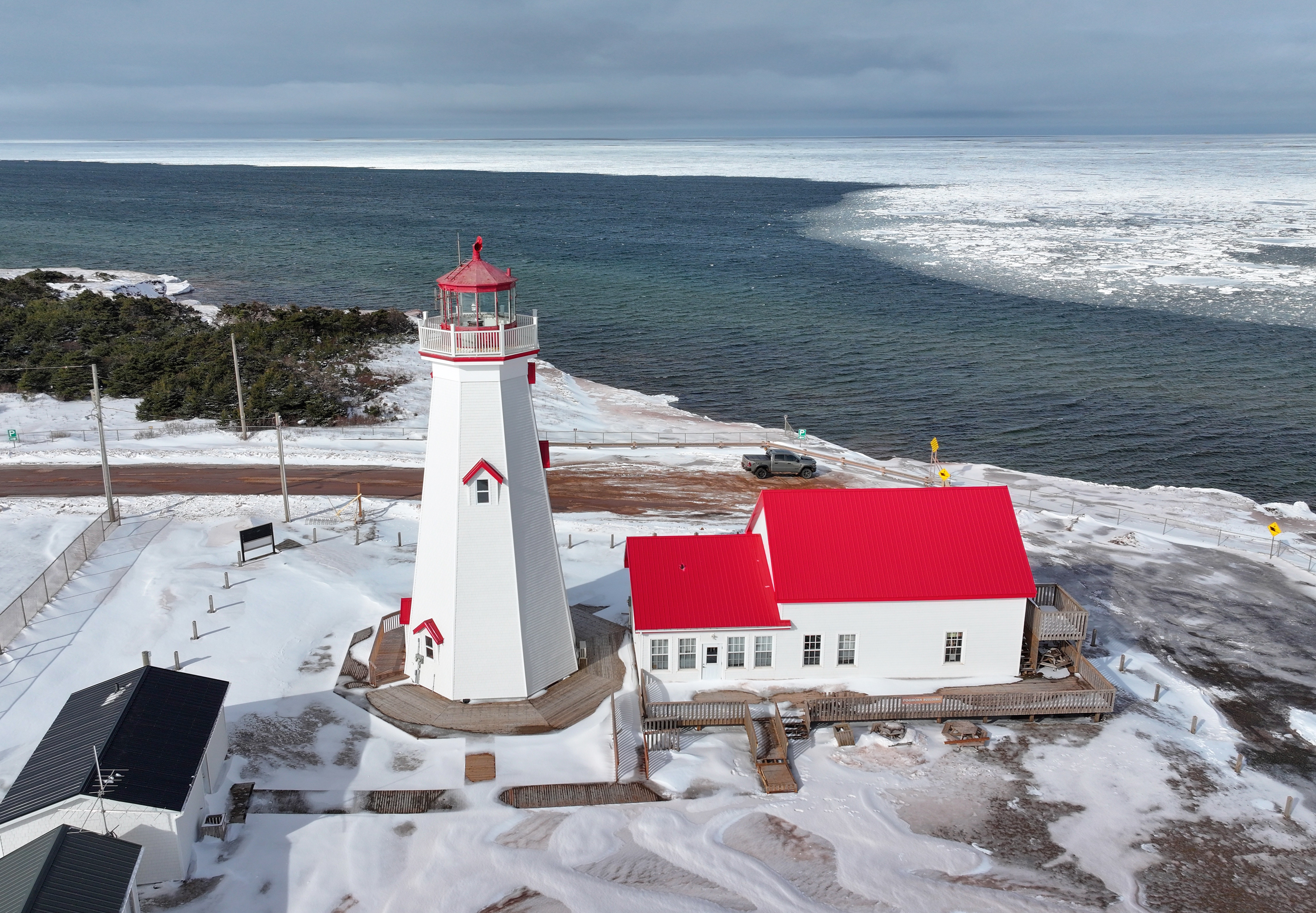
East Point lighthouse

Among others, the following ships have been wrecked at East Point:

- SS Quebec in 1879.
- HMS Phoenix in 1882.
- HMCS Assiniboine while under tow in 1945.
