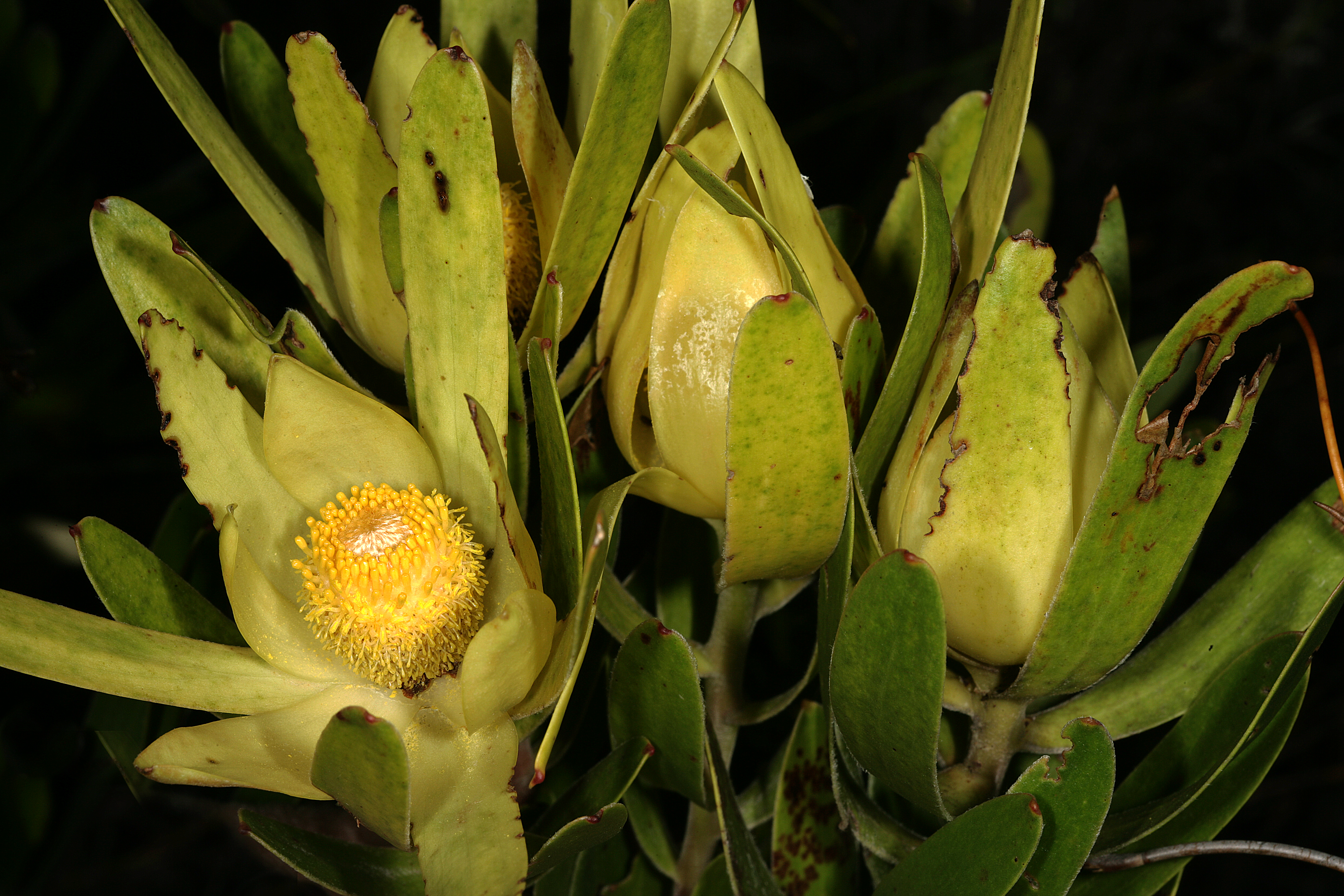

Conservation status
- Least Concern (IUCN 3.1)

Scientific classification
- Kingdom: Plantae
- Clade: Embryophytes
- Clade: Tracheophytes
- Clade: Angiosperms
- Clade: Eudicots
- Order: Proteales
- Family: Proteaceae
- Genus: Leucadendron
- Species: L. laureolum

Binomial name
- Leucadendron laureolum (Lam.) Fourc.

Synonyms
- Leucadendron decorum R. Br.

= Leucadendron laureolum =

Species of flowering plant

Leucadendron laureolum, common names golden conebush and laurel leaf conebush, is a species of plant in the family Proteaceae. It is endemic to the southwestern Cape Provinces of South Africa, and also cultivated. It is a large bush that turns bright yellow in the winter flowering season.

== See also ==
- Cape Flats Sand Fynbos
