= Morice Town =

Suburb of Plymouth, Devon

Coordinates: 50.380°N 4.179°W

- Location within Devon
- Unitary authority: Plymouth
- Ceremonial county: Devon
- Region: South West
- Country: England
- Sovereign state: United Kingdom
- Post town: PLYMOUTH
- Postcode district: PL2 1xx
- Dialling code: 01752
- Police: Devon and Cornwall
- Fire: Devon and Somerset
- Ambulance: South Western

Morice Town is a suburb of Plymouth in the English county of Devon.

It named after Sir William Morice who owned the land at the time that it was being developed for housing for the employees in the Dockyard.

It was originally a part of the town of Devonport, but since the amalgamation of the Three Towns in 1914, it is now a part of Plymouth.
