= Hubert Grenfell =

British naval officer (1845–1906)

Hubert Henry Grenfell (12 June 1845 – 13 September 1906) was a British naval officer, and expert in naval gunnery.

== Life ==
He was born at Rugby on 12 June 1845, the son of Algernon Grenfell, a cleric and schoolmaster, and his wife Maria Guerin Price, sister of Bonamy Price. Joining the navy as a cadet on 13 December 1859, when fourteen, Grenfell passed out first from the Britannia, and gained as sub-lieutenant the Beaumont Testimonial in 1865. He qualified as gunnery lieutenant in 1867, and was appointed first lieutenant on HMS Excellent, on 22 September 1869.

While holding this appointment, Grenfell worked out with the naval engineer Edward Newman pioneering hydraulic mountings for heavy naval ordnance. He also published in Engineering and service journals. On 31 December 1876 he was made commander, and on 1 May 1877 was appointed, on account of his linguistic attainments, second naval attaché to the maritime courts of Europe. He also acted as naval adviser to the British representatives at the Berlin Congress of 1878.

On 22 September 1882, the sloop Phoenix, under Grenfell's command, foundered off Prince Edward Island. No lives, however, were lost. He retired with the rank of captain on 2 December 1887.

Grenfell helped to form the Navy League, and served at one time on its executive committee. He died at Alverstoke, Hampshire, on 13 September 1906.

== Gun sight research ==
Grenfell was associated with the experimental work of Armstrong, Whitworth & Co. He was the first to direct the Admiralty's attention to the night-sighting of guns; and about 1891, on the introduction of the incandescent electric lamp, he invented his "self-illuminating night sights for naval ordnance". The invention was for fifteen years attached to all heavy guns in the British navy, and was adopted by some foreign navies. Grenfell was also one of the first to suggest the use of sight-scales marked in large plain figures for naval guns, and advocated, though without success, the adoption of a telescopic light for day use. He also worked out the arrangement subsequently adopted for quick-firing field artillery, by which the changes of angle between the line of sight and the axis of the bore which are required when firing at a moving target can be effected without altering the line of sight.

== Works ==
In April 1877, Grenfell read before the Institution of Naval Architects a paper advocating the trial of Hermann Gruson's chilled cast-iron armour in England, and in 1887 he published Grüson's Chilled Cast-iron Armour (translated from the German of Julius von Schütz: de:Julius von Schütz).

== Family ==
In 1872 Grenfell married Eleanor Kate Cunningham. She was the only daughter of Henry Duncan Preston Cunningham of Bury House near Gosport, a noted naval engineer.
