= RML 64-pounder 64 cwt gun =

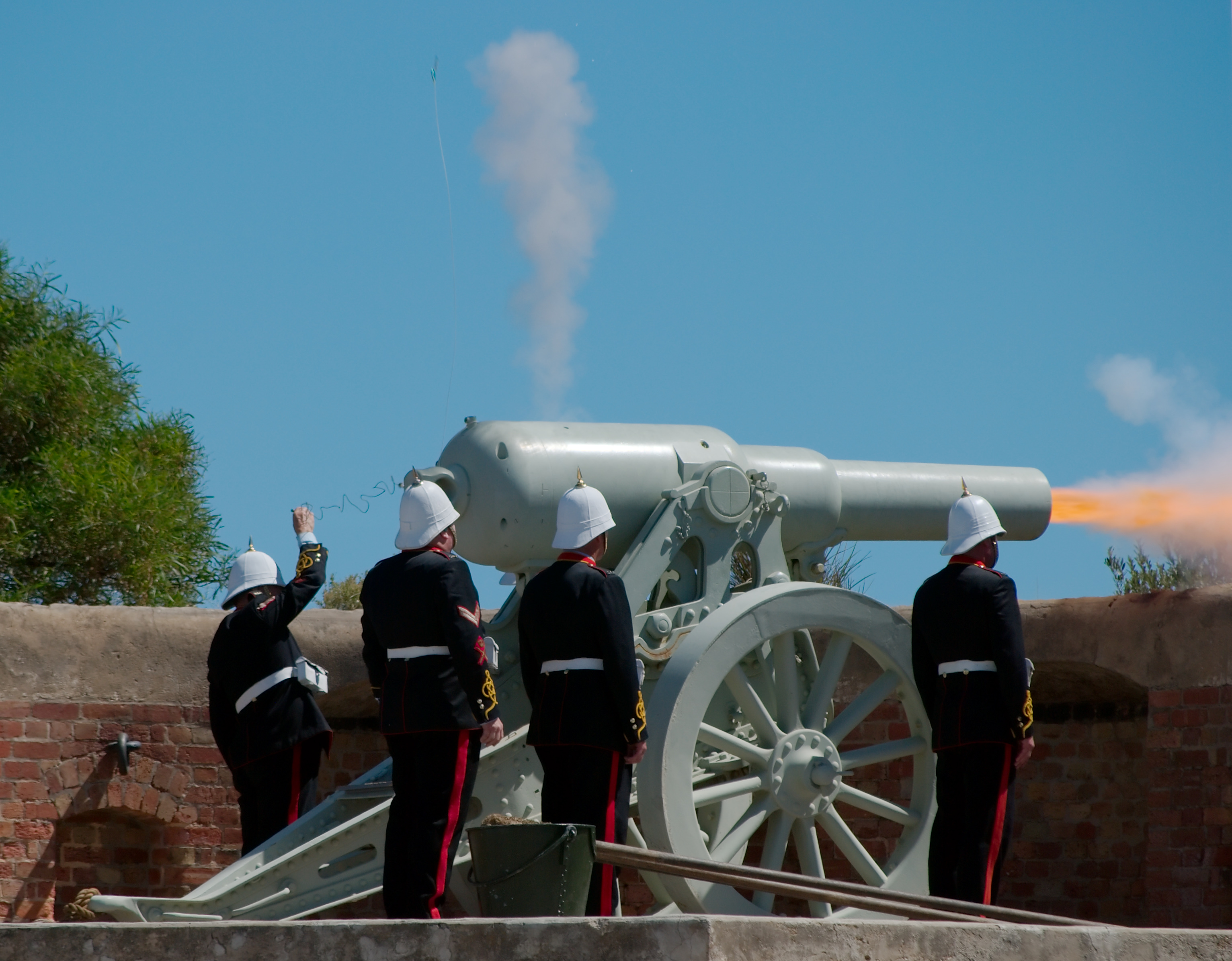
- Fortification mounted MK III gun firing at Fort Glanville Conservation Park, South Australia
- Type: Naval gun Fortification gun
- Place of origin: United Kingdom

Service history
- In service: 1865–190?
- Used by: British Empire

Production history
- Designer: Woolwich Arsenal
- Designed: 1864
- Manufacturer: Woolwich Arsenal; Elswick Ordnance Company
- Variants: Mk I, II, III

Specifications
- Mass: 64-long-hundredweight (3,300 kg)
- Length: 9.83 in (25.0 cm)
- Barrel length: 97.5 in (248 cm) bore
- Shell: 64 pounds (29 kg)
- Calibre: 6.3 inches (160 mm)
- Action: RML
- Breech: Muzzle-loading
- Muzzle velocity: Wrought-iron tube : 1,252 feet per second (382 m/s); Mk III steel tube : 1,390 feet per second (420 m/s)
- Effective firing range: 5,000 yards (4,600 m)

The RML 64-pounder 64 cwt gun is a Rifled, Muzzle Loading (RML) naval, field or fortification artillery gun manufactured in England in the 19th century, which fired a projectile weighing approximately 64 pounds (29 kg). "64 cwt" refers to the gun's weight rounded up to differentiate it from other "64-pounder" guns.

== Description ==
The calibre of 6.3 in (16 cm) was chosen to enable it to fire remaining stocks of spherical shells originally made for the obsolete 32 pounder guns if necessary.

Mark I (adopted in 1864) and Mark II (adopted 1866) guns, and Mark III guns made from 1867 – April 1871 had wrought-iron inner "A" tubes surrounded by wrought-iron coils.

Mark III guns made after April 1871 were built with toughened mild steel "A" tubes, and earlier Mark III guns were re-tubed with steel and were classified as a siege gun in land service. Remaining guns with iron tubes were used for sea service.

Rifling of all guns consisted of 3 grooves, with a uniform twist of 1 turn in 40 calibres (i.e. 1 turn in 252 in (640 cm)).

== Ammunition ==
The gun's standard shell was "common shell", for firing on troops in cover, ships and buildings, weighed 57.4 pounds (26.0 kg) when empty with a bursting charge of 7.1 pounds (3.2 kg). Shrapnel shells could also be fired; a 66.6 pounds (30.2 kg) shell with a 9-ounce (260 g) bursting charge propelling 234 metal balls.

== Surviving Examples of Guns ==
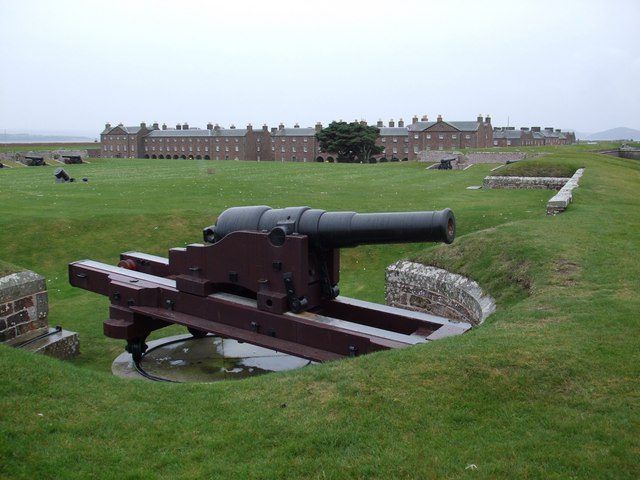
The sole surviving Mk I gun, at Fort George, Scotland.

- Mark I, Mark II number 164 and Mark III guns at Fort George, near Inverness, Scotland, UK
- Mark III gun number 17, on board HMS Gannet, Chatham Dockyard, UK
- Mark III gun number 294, dated 1867, Nothe Fort, Weymouth, UK
- Mark III gun at Fort Brockhurst, Gosport, UK
- Two Mark III guns, including no. 318 dated 1867 at Pendennis Castle, Cornwall, UK
- Mark III guns number 462 and 463 at Fort Glanville, Adelaide, South Australia
- Mark III gun number 739, dated 1878, Townsville, Queensland, Australia
- Mark III gun number 742 dated 1878 - ex HMQS Otter (Queensland colonial navy) example displayed in Queens Park Toowoomba, Queensland, Australia
- Two Mark III guns, including No 729 dated 1878, at Fort Lytton Historic Military Precinct, Brisbane, Australia
- Lei Yue Mun Fort's Central Battery, Hong Kong
- 6 guns at Fort Siloso, Singapore including Mark III gun Number 767, dated 1874
- RML 64-pr 64 cwt Mk 3 at Albert Park, Auckland, Auckland, New Zealand

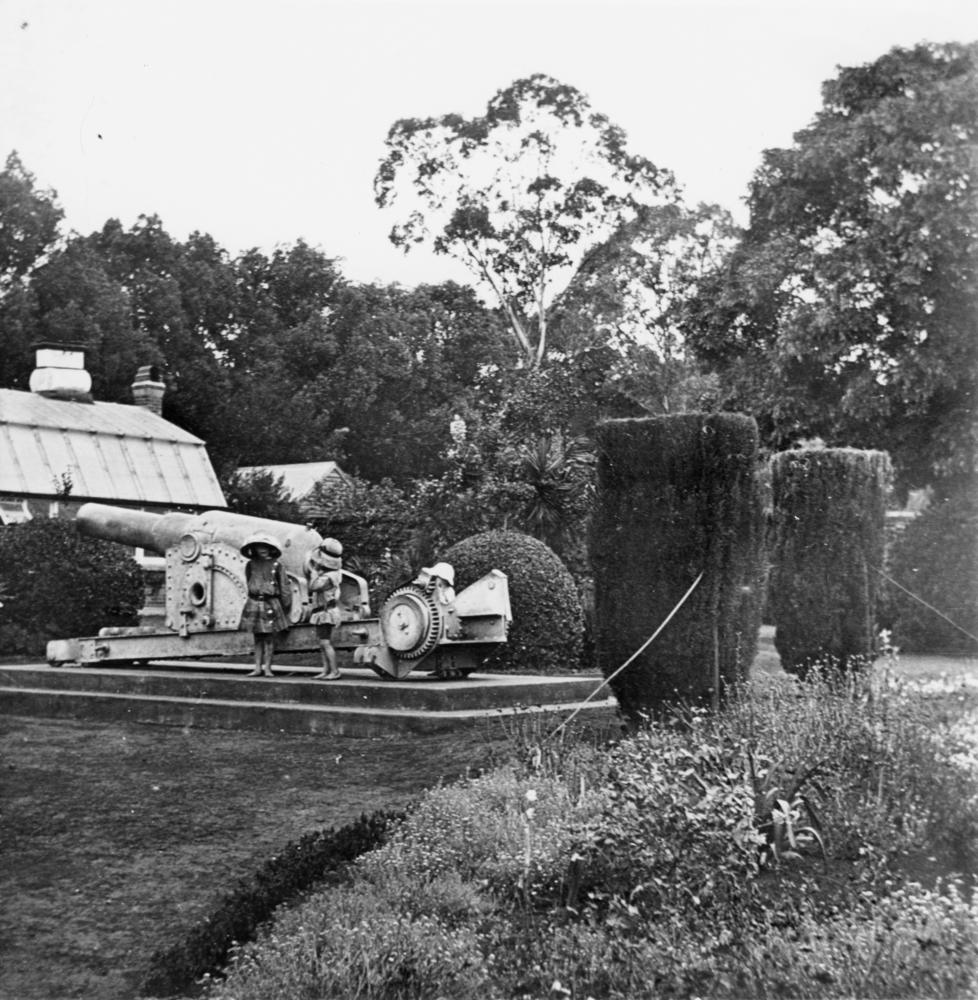
Children posing with the Armstrong gun in the Toowoomba Botanic Gardens, 1912.

== Surviving Examples of Ammunition ==
- RML 64pdr shell that has been fired, and RML 64 fuse at Fort Lytton Historic Military Precinct, Brisbane, Australia
- RML 64pdr Mark I shell (no fuse) is held in the collection of the Australian War Memorial, Canberra

== See also ==
- RML 64-pounder 71 cwt gun : conversion of SBML 8-inch 65 cwt gun

== Bibliography ==
- Treatise on the Construction and Manufacture of Ordnance in the British Service. War Office, UK, 1879
- Text Book of Gunnery, 1902. LONDON : PRINTED FOR HIS MAJESTY'S STATIONERY OFFICE, BY HARRISON AND SONS, ST. MARTIN'S LANE
