= Nathaniel Barnaby =

Sir Nathaniel Barnaby KCB
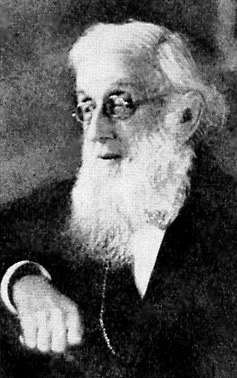
- Sir Nathaniel Barnaby
- Born: 25 February 1829; Chatham, Kent
- Died: 16 June 1915 (aged 86)
- Engineering career
- Discipline: Civil, Marine

Sir Nathaniel Barnaby, KCB (25 February 1829 – 16 June 1915) was Chief Constructor of the Royal Navy from 1872 to 1885.

== Biography ==
Born on 25 February 1829 in Chatham, Barnaby began his career as a naval apprentice at Sheerness in 1843. He won a scholarship to Portsmouth Naval School in 1848. On qualifying in 1852, he became a draughtsman at Woolwich dockyard. He was invited to join the Department of Naval Construction in 1854 to take part in designing the first British ironclad warship, HMS Warrior.

Sir Edward Reed became Chief Constructor in 1863. He was married to Barnaby's sister, and he made Barnaby head of his staff. In this post, he worked on the majority of British warships, up to the time of HMS Monarch. When Reed retired in 1872, Barnaby was elevated to "President of the Council of Construction and Chief Naval Architect." Always referred to as the "Chief Constructor," the title was changed in 1875 to "Director of Naval Construction" (DNC).

Nathaniel Barnaby was made a Companion of the Order of the Bath in 1876 and a Knight Commander of the Order of the Bath in 1885, the year he retired because of ill-health. In retirement, he lived to see the start of the Dreadnought era.

During his thirteen years in office, he faced possibly more and various changes in ship design than any Director of Naval Construction before or since. He saw: main armament change from 12-inch muzzle-loading rifles to 16.25-inch breechloaders; introduction of secondary armament; armament housed in central citadels; armament housed in barbettes and in turrets; and development of the torpedo. He also saw the end of rigging in battleships.

He was succeeded in the role of Chief Constructor by Sir William White.

Barnaby died on 16 June 1915, in London.
