= William White (naval architect) =

British warship designer (1845–1913)

Sir William White KCB FRS FRSE
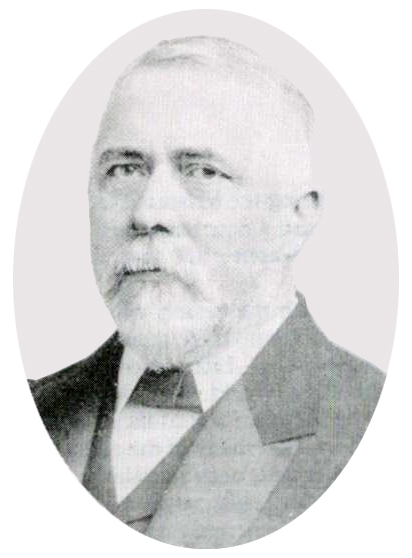
- Born: William Henry White; 2 February 1845; Plymouth, Devon
- Died: 27 February 1913 (aged 68); London
- Education: Royal School of Naval Architecture
- Engineering career
- Discipline: Civil, Marine
- Institutions: Institution of Civil Engineers (president), Institution of Mechanical Engineers (president), Institution of Marine Engineers (president)
- Projects: Royal Sovereign-class battleships King Edward VII-class battleships Royal Yacht HMY Victoria and Albert passenger liner RMS Mauretania

Sir William Henry White, KCB, FRS, FRSE (2 February 1845 – 27 February 1913) was a prolific British warship designer and Chief Constructor at the Admiralty.

== Biography ==
White was born in Devonport, the son of Robert White, a currier, and his wife, Jane Matthews.

He became an apprentice at the naval dockyard there in 1859. In 1863, he obtained a scholarship to enter the newly formed Royal School of Naval Architecture in South Kensington, in London. After his apprenticeship he worked for the Admiralty on specifications and calculations for new ships, and became secretary to the then Chief Constructor of the Admiralty, Edward Reed, until the latter's resignation on 9 July 1870.

He was then appointed instructor on naval design at the Royal School of Naval Architecture, and in 1872 became secretary of the Council of Construction which oversaw all Royal Navy ship construction. From 1872–1873 he worked at Pembroke and Portsmouth Dockyards.

In March 1875 he was promoted to Assistant Constructor and married later in that year. He resigned from the Admiralty in April 1883 and joined Sir William Armstrong's company as designer and manager of their warship construction. He returned to the Admiralty as Director of Naval Construction and Assistant Controller of the Navy on 1 August 1885. He was immediately involved in a reorganisation of the dockyards and technical departments, and later worked on the design of the revolutionary Royal Sovereign-class battleships. He was knighted in 1895.

He suffered a nervous breakdown in 1901 following criticism in Parliament for the near-capsizing of the Royal Yacht, the Victoria and Albert, which had happened when she was floated out of the graving dock where she was being fitted out on 3 July 1900. The cause was around 700 tons of excessive weight above the centre of gravity of the ship, in particular a large amount of cement sound-proofing around the Royal apartments. Consequently, the metacentric height was reduced from a stable 2 feet to a very unsafe 3 inches. Although it exonerated him from direct responsibility, the Admiralty blamed him for "not sufficiently impressing upon your subordinates the novelty and importance of the task entrusted to them". He submitted his last design for a battleship, the King Edward VII class, in April 1901, but he was ill and constantly worried about trivial matters, unable to delegate even the most minor decision. He requested early retirement and left the Admiralty on 31 January 1902.

In the 16 years that he was head of naval construction, he bore ultimate responsibility for the design of 43 battleships, 26 armoured cruisers, 102 protected cruisers and 74 unarmoured warships, a total of 245 ships worth (in 1900) £80 million.

Following his retirement, he was a consulting architect in the design of the Cunard liner RMS Mauretania and president of the Institution of Civil Engineers, the Institution of Mechanical Engineers, and the Institution of Marine Engineers. He was also chairman of the council, Royal Society of Arts from 1909–1910 and governor of Imperial College from 1907 until his death. He died from a stroke in London on 27 February 1913.

White was elected a Fellow of the Royal Society in June 1888 He was conferred with Honorary Membership of the Institution of Engineers and Shipbuilders in Scotland in 1894. He was elected a member of the Royal Swedish Academy of Sciences in 1900. In the same year, he was elected an honorary member of the American Society of Mechanical Engineers.

Portrait of William Henry White, executed by William Mainwaring Palin in 1902

== Arms ==
Coat of arms of William White

Motto
Build Staunch And True

== Publications ==
- A Manual of Naval Architecture: For the use of Officers of the Royal Navy, Shipbuilders (1887)

Professional and academic associations
Preceded by Samuel Waite Johnson	President of the Institution of Mechanical Engineers; 1899–1900	Succeeded by William Henry Maw
Preceded by John Clarke Hawkshaw	President of the Institution of Civil Engineers; November 1903 – November 1904	Succeeded by Guilford Lindsey Molesworth
