= Buster =

Buster or BUSTER may refer to:

== People ==
- Buster (surname)
- Buster (given name)
- Buster (nickname)

== Arts and entertainment ==
=== Comics ===
- Buster (comics), a British comic
- Buster (sport comic), a Swedish comic

=== Film and television ===
- Buster (film), a film starring Phil Collins
- Buster (MythBusters), the MythBusters crash test dummy
- Buster Film Festival for Children and Youth (BUSTER), a Danish film festival

=== Music ===
- Buster (band), an English rock band, formed in Wirral, near Liverpool in 1974
- Buster (soundtrack), the soundtrack to the film Buster
- "Buster", the theme song by Nanna Lüders Jensen for the Danish television show Busters verden
- Busters (group), a South Korean pop group

== Computing and technology ==
- Buster, an Amiga custom computer chip
- Buster, a multiservice tactical brevity code signaling an aircraft pilot to use maximum continuous power
- Buster, the codename of version 10 of the Debian Linux operating system

== Animals ==
- Buster (dog) (died 2009) a dog owned by Roy Hattersley, who wrote a book credited to Buster
- Buster (spaniel) (2002–2015), a British military detection dog
- Buster (died 2009), a dog owned by Paul O'Grady that regularly appeared on The Paul O'Grady Show

== Other ==
- Buster (1884 ship), Canadian barquentine
- Buster Boyd Bridge, American bridge
