= List of ship launches in 1884 =

The list of ship launches in 1884 includes a chronological list of some ships launched in 1884.

Date	Ship	Class / type	Builder	Location	Country	Notes
3 January	Chandon	Steamship	Messrs. Earle's Shipbuilding & Engineering Company	Hull	United Kingdom	For Messrs. Henry Briggs, Sons & Co.
3 January	Lin o' Dee	Steamship	Messrs. Murdoch & Murray	Port Glasgow	United Kingdom	For Granite City Steamship Company.
5 January	Gayton	Barque	Messrs. Charles Hill & Sons	Bristol	United Kingdom	For Messrs. Duncan, Fox & Co.
8 January	Nan Shui	Nan Chen-class cruiser	Howaldtswerke-Deutsche Werft	Kiel	Germany	For Imperial Chinese Navy.
12 January	Arncliffe	Fishing smack	Whitby and Robin Hood's Bay Co.	Whitby	United Kingdom	For Whitby Smack and Trawling Co.
12 January	Carn Marth	Steamship	Tyne Iron Shipbuilding Company	Willington Quay	United Kingdom	For private owner.
12 January	Galgate	Merchantman	Messrs. Richardson, Duck & Co.	South Stockton	United Kingdom	For Messrs. Chadwick & Prichard.
12 January	Iolantha	Steamship	Blyth Shipbuilding Co. Ltd	Blyth	United Kingdom	For Nielsen, Andersen & Co.
12 January	Louis	Steamship	Osbourne, Graham & Co	North Hylton	United Kingdom	For L. Flornoy et Fils, or Messrs. Budd & Co.
12 January	Reliance	Merchantman	Messrs. W. H. Potter & Sons	Liverpool	United Kingdom	For Messrs. W. T. Dixon & Sons.
12 January	Ulrica	Merchantman	Messrs. Barclay, Curle & Co.	Whiteinch	United Kingdom	For Messrs. Hendry, Ferguson & Co.
12 January	Westbury	Steamship	Messrs. Charles Hill & Sons	Bristol	United Kingdom	For Messrs. Edward Stock & Son.
12 January	Yamashiro Maru	Steamship	Sir W. G. Armstrong, Mitchell & Co. (Limited)	Newcastle upon Tyne	United Kingdom	For Union Steamship Company of Japan.
12 January	Unnamed	Steamship	Blyth Iron Shipbuilding Co.	Blyth	United Kingdom	For Messrs. Nielsen, Andersen & Co.
14 January	Caledonian	Steamship	Messrs. Caird, Purdie & Co.	Barrow-in-Furness	United Kingdom	For Messrs Hugh Blaik & Co.
15 January	City of York	Smack	Mr. McCann	Hull	United Kingdom	For Messrs. R. Simpson & Co.
14 January	Clutha	Ferry	Messrs. T. B. Seath & Co	Rutherglen	United Kingdom	For Clyde Trust.
15 January	Arrow	Steamship	Messrs. Edward Finch & Co. (Limited)	Chepstow	United Kingdom	For Cardiff and West of England Steamship Company (Limited).
15 January	Bedlington	Steamship	Barrow Ship Building Co. Ltd.	Barrow-in-Furness	United Kingdom	For Mountstewart Steamship Co. Ltd.
15 January	Carlile P. Patterson	Survey ship	James D. Leary	Brooklyn, New York	United Kingdom	For United States Coast and Geodetic Survey.
15 January	Maiden	Pilot cutter	Campbell Ogilvie	Slaughden	United Kingdom	For Trinity House.
15 January	Octaria	Steamship	Usk Shipbuilding Company (Limited)	Newport	United Kingdom	For Messrs. William Hunter & Co.
15 January	Tranmere	Steamship	Thomas Brassey	Birkenhead	United Kingdom	For private owner.
16 January	Zafiro	Steamship	Messrs. Hall, Russell & Co.	Footdee	United Kingdom	For China and Manilla Steamship Company.
26 January	Bernard	Steamship	Messrs. Turnbull & Sons	Whitby	United Kingdom	For private owner.
28 January	Elcano	Gunboat	Carraca Arsenal	Cádiz	Spain	For Spanish Navy.
29 January	Nebo	Steamship	James Laing	Deptford	United Kingdom	For D. G. Pinkney & Co.
29 January	Warspite	Imperieuse-class cruiser	Chatham Dockyard	Chatham	United Kingdom	For Royal Navy.
30 January	Aberforth	Steamship	Messrs. D. J. Dunlop & Co.	Port Glasgow	United Kingdom	For A. & A. Y. Mackay.
30 January	Banshee	Paddle steamer	Laird Bros.	Birkenhead	United Kingdom	For London and North Western Railway.
30 January	Borderer	Steamship	Barrow Ship Building Co. Ltd.	Barrow-in-Furness	United Kingdom	For J. Glyn & Son.
30 January	Moss Rose	Sailing barge	Messrs. W. Bayley & Sons	Ipswich	United Kingdom	For Richard Cox.
31 January	Castlecrag	Steamship	Messrs. Wigham, Richardson & Co.	Low Walker	United Kingdom	For Messrs. Thomlinson, Thompson & Co.
31 January	Highlands	Steamship	Messrs. Alexander Hall & Co.	Footdee	United Kingdom	For Lands Line.
31 January	The Lady Nell	Steam yacht	Messrs. Ramage & Ferguson	Leith	United Kingdom	For Earl of Shrewsbury.
January	Benvenue	Merchantman	Messrs. Birrell, Stenhouse & Co.	Dumbarton	United Kingdom	For Messrs. Watson Bros.
January	Bortonius	Steamship	Kish, Boolds & Co	Pallion	United Kingdom	For Thomas Kish.
January	Leona	Steamship	Messrs. John Reid & Co	Port Glasgow	United Kingdom	For private owner.
2 February	Pioneer	Fishing boat	James Mowse	Gourdon	United Kingdom	For Robert Cargill.
8 February	Posadas	Paddle steamer	Messrs. Napier, Shanks & Bell	Yoker	United Kingdom	For Lloyd Argentino Co.
9 February	Captain	Fishing boat	Mr. Doyle	Kingstown	United Kingdom	For C. Waters.
9 February	Charity	Fishing boat	Mr. Synott	Kingstown	United Kingdom	For T. Moloney.
9 February	Emma	Fishing boat	Mr. Doyle	Kingstown	United Kingdom	For G. Pluck.
9 February	Lord Longford	Fishing boat	G. Doyle	Ringsend	United Kingdom	For G. Mitchell.
9 February	Southwold	Steamship	Short Bros.	Pallion	United Kingdom	For Woods & Lorentzen.
9 February	Storm	Fishing boat	Mr. Synott	Kingstown	United Kingdom	For R. Brennan.
12 February	Cerdic	Steamship	Messrs. M. Pearse & Co.	Stockton-on-Tees	United Kingdom	For Richard J. Kay.
12 February	Fort George	Merchantman	Messrs. Workman, Clarke & Co.	Belfast	United Kingdom	For Messrs. Clark & Service.
12 February	Para	Steamship	Messrs. Edward Withy & Co.	Middleton	United Kingdom	For George Steel.
13 February	Gironde	Nive-class transport ship	Bichon frères	Lormont	France	For French Navy.
13 February	Bulli	Steamship	Messrs. Napier, Shanks & Bell	Yoker	United Kingdom	For Bulli Coal Mining Company.
13 February	City of Manchester	Fishing smack	Mr. Westman	Hull	United Kingdom	For Messrs. R. Simpson & Co.
13 February	Dunedin	Steamship	Messrs. Alexander Stephen & Sons	Linthouse	United Kingdom	For Messrs. Henderson & M'Intosh.
13 February	Mercurio	Steamship	Messrs. Aitken & Mansel	Whiteinch	United Kingdom	For Mensagerias Fluviales a Vapor.
13 February	Wivenhoe	Steamship	Messrs. W. Gray & Co.	West Hartlepool	United Kingdom	For Messrs. J. H. Murrell & Co.
14 February	Challenger	Fishing boat	Alexander Watson	Banff	United Kingdom	For James Mair.
14 February	Massilia	Steamship	Messrs. Caird & Co.	Greenock	United Kingdom	For Peninsular and Oriental Steam Navigation Company.
14 February	Opobo	Steamship	Messrs. Barclay, Curle & Co.	Whiteinch	United Kingdom	For British and African Steam Navigation Company (Limited).
15 February	Norham	Steamship	Barrow Ship Building Co. Ltd.	Barrow-in-Furness	United Kingdom	For J. Lohden & Co.
16 February	Comète	Lion-class gunboat	Arsenal de Cherbourg	Cherbourg	France	For French Navy
16 February	Cawdor	Merchantman	Messrs. Oswald, Mordaunt & Co.	Southampton	United Kingdom	For J. Houston.
25 February	Vigilant	Steamship	Messrs. T. & W. Toward & Co.	Low Benwell	United Kingdom	For Messrs. Leach, Harrison & Forwood.
26 February	Cymmrodorian	Steamship	Messrs. Schlesinger, Davis & Co.	Wallsend	United Kingdom	For private owner.
26 February	Ningchow	Steamship	Messrs. David & William Henderson & Co.	Partick	United Kingdom	For China Shippers' Mutual Steam Navigation Company (Limited).
26 February	Shaftesbury	Steamship	Messrs. H. Murray & Co.	Dumbarton	United Kingdom	For Messrs. Craig & Nightingale.
26 February	Sunlight	Steamship	Messrs. R. Craggs & Sons	Middlesbrough	United Kingdom	For private owner.
27 February	Ems	Steamship	Messrs. Elder & Co.	Fairfield	United Kingdom	For Norddeutsche Lloyd.
27 February	Kestrel	Steam trawler	Messrs. S. & H. Morton & Co.	Leith	United Kingdom	For Scottish Steam Fishing and Shipping Company.
27 February	Regius	Steamship	Messrs. Campbell, Mackintosh & Bowstead	Scotswood	United Kingdom	For Messrs. R. Conaway & Co.
28 February	Burgos	Steamship	Messrs. Richardson, Duck & Co.	South Stockton	United Kingdom	For Messrs. Henry Briggs, Sons & Co.
28 February	Hekla	Steamship	Scott & Co.	Greenock	United Kingdom	For Dampskibs-Selskabet Thingvalla.
28 February	Trelaske	Steamship	Messrs Redhead and Co	South Shields	United Kingdom	For Messrs Hain and Son.
29 February	Mexico	Steamship	Messrs. Robert Napier & Sons	Govan	United Kingdom	For Compania Mexicana Transatlantica.
February	Aberfeldy	Merchantman	Messrs. A. M'Millan & Sons	Dumbarton	United Kingdom	For Gavin Cowper.
February	Clive	Tug	Messrs. Robert Duncan & Co.	Port Glasgow	United Kingdom	For Messrs. James Wyllie & Co.
February	Clutha No. 3	Ferry	Messrs. T. B. Seat & Co.	Rutherglen	United Kingdom	For private owner.
February	Clutha No. 4	Ferry	Messrs. T. B. Seat & Co.	Rutherglen	United Kingdom	For private owner.
1 March	Delabole	Steamship	Messrs. Mordey & Carney	Newport	United Kingdom	For F. S. Hockaday.
1 March	Dollie	Coaster	Barrow Ship Building Co. Ltd.	Barrow-in-Furness	United Kingdom	For Steamship Dollie Co. Ltd. or Messrs. J. J. Mack & Sons.
1 March	Dynamo	Steamship	Messrs. Earle's Shipbuilding and Engineering Company	Hull	United Kingdom	For Messrs. Thomas Wilson, Sons & Co.
1 March	Horn Head	Cargo ship	Harland & Wolff	Belfast	United Kingdom	For Ulster Steamship Co.
1 March	Shastra	Steamship	Messrs. Dobson & Charles	Grangemouth	United Kingdom	For private owner.
11 March	John Stevenson	Steamship	Messrs. T. Turnbull & Son	Whitby	United Kingdom	For private owner.
12 March	A. D. Bordes	Merchantman	W. B. Thompson	Whiteinch	United Kingdom	For MM. A. D. Bordes et Fils.
12 March	Bonavista	Steamship	Messrs. Wigham, Richardson & Co.	Newcastle upon Tyne	United Kingdom	For Black Diamond Steamship Company.
12 March	Highland Forest	Barque	Messrs. Ramage & Ferguson	Leith	United Kingdom	For Messrs. Crane, Colvil & Co. Collided with a pier on being launched and was severely damaged.
12 March	Anatolie	Steamship	Forges et Chantiers de la Méditerranée	Le Havre	France	For Paquet, N., & Cie.
12 March	Taormina	Steamship	Messrs. Alexander Stephen & Sons	Linthouse	United Kingdom	For Messrs. Robert M. Sloman & Co.
13 March	Bengore Head	Steamship	Messrs. A. & J. Inglis	Pointhouse	United Kingdom	For Ulster Steamship Company (Limited).
13 March	Roquelle	Steamship	Messrs. Barclay, Curle & Co.	Whiteinch	United Kingdom	For British and African Steam Navigation Company (Limited).
13 March	Vancouver	Steamship	Messrs. Charles Connell & Co.	Scotstoun-on-the-Clyde	United Kingdom	For Mississippi and Dominion Steamship Company.
14 March	Railleur	Hareng-class fishery protection vessel	Chantiers et Ateliers Augustin Normand	Le Havre	France	For French Navy
15 March	Buzzard	Steamship	Messrs. James & George Thomson	Clydebank	United Kingdom	For John Burns.
15 March	Euterpe	Barque	Barrow Ship Building Co. Ltd.	Barrow-in-Furness	United Kingdom	For B. Wencke & Sons.
15 March	Hutton Hall	Merchantman	Messsrs. W. H. Potter & Sons	Liverpool	United Kingdom	For Messrs. Herron, Dunn & Co.
15 March	The Cutch	Steamship	Messrs. James Bremner & Co.	Hull	United Kingdom	For private owner.
24 March	Sirio	Steamship	Robert Napier and Sons	Glasgow	United Kingdom	For Società Italiana di Transporti Marittimi Raggio & Co.
25 March	Mosquito	Tug	Messrs. Earle's Shipbuilding and Engineering Company	Hull	United Kingdom	For Messrs. T. Wilson, Sons & Co.
26 March	Loch Trool	Barque	Govan Shipbuilding Company	Govan	United Kingdom	For James Sproat.
26 March	Medusa	Steam launch	John M'Adam	Govan	United Kingdom	For Scottish Meteorological Society.
27 March	Fortunatus	Steamship	Messrs. R. Irvine & Co.	West Hartlepool	United Kingdom	For Messrs. Metcalfe & Simpson.
27 March	Madjus	Steamship	Kish, Boolds & Co.	Pallion	United Kingdom	For Thomas Kish.
27 March	Ville de Riposto	Steamship	Robert Thompson & Sons	Southwick	United Kingdom	ForCompagnie Havraise Peninsulaire Navigation à Vapeur.
27 March	Theme	Steamship	Messrs. MacIlwaine & Lewis	Belfast	United Kingdom	For W. I. Granver.
28 March	Silverhorn	Merchantman	Messrs. Russell & Co.	Kingston	United Kingdom	For Messrs. James R. De Wolf & Son.
29 March	County of Salop	Steamship	Barrow Ship Building Co. Ltd.	Barrow-in-Furness	United Kingdom	For Taylor, Abrahams & Co.
29 March	Dora Ewing	Steamship	Usk Shipbuilding Company (Limited)	Newport	United Kingdom	For Cornubia Steamship Company.
29 March	Lincoln City	Steamship	Messrs. W. Gray & Co.	West Hartlepool	United Kingdom	For Direct Scandinavian and American Steamship Company (Limited).
29 March	Nar	Steamship	Messrs. Scott & Co.	Bowling	United Kingdom	For Nar Steamship Company (Limited).
29 March	Naranja	Steamship	Messrs. Murdoch & Murray	Port Glasgow	United Kingdom	For Messrs. Goodyear & Co.
29 March	Number One	Dredger	Messrs. H. M'Intyre & Co.	Merksworth	United Kingdom	For Swansea Harbour Commissioners.
29 March	Oakdene	Steamship	Short Bros.	Pallion	United Kingdom	For Bulman & Dixon.
29 March	Sierra Miranda	Merchantman	Messrs. John Reid & Co	Port Glasgow	United Kingdom	For Messrs. Thomson, Anderson & Co.
29 March	Telephone	Fishing boat	James Cordiner	Cove	United Kingdom	For James Wood.
29 March	Yokohama Maru	Steamship	London and Glasgow Shipbuilding and Engineering Co.	Govan	United Kingdom	For Mitsu Bishi Mail Steamship Company.
31 March	Latharssa	Steamship	Messrs. John Fullerton & Co.	Merksworth	United Kingdom	For Hugh H. Smiley.
31 March	Mazeppa	Steam yacht	Messrs. Ramage & Ferguson	Leith	United Kingdom	For Walter S. Bailey.
31 March	Miss Hughes	Merchantman	Henry Hughes	Caernarfon	United Kingdom	For private owner.
31 March	Partridge	Steamship	Messrs. Edward Finch & Co., Limited	Chepstow	United Kingdom	For private owner.
March	Arabian	Steamship	Messrs. Murray Bros.	Dumbarton	United Kingdom	For Messrs. Morton & Williamson.
March	Cutch	Steamship	James Bremner & Co.	Hull	United Kingdom	For Hajeebhoy Abdoolabhoy & Joomabhoy Lalljee.
March	Daisy	Steamship	Messrs. H. M'Intyre & Co.	Paisley	United Kingdom	For Messrs. Alexander A. Laird & Co.
March	Earl Wemyss	Merchantman	Messrs. Robert Duncan & Co.	Port Glasgow	United Kingdom	For Messrs. A. M'Allister & Co.
March	Latharna	Steamship	Messrs. John Fullarton & Co.	Paisley	United Kingdom	For H. H. Simley.
March	Suruga Maru	Steamship	Messrs. H. M'Intyre & Co.	Paisley	United Kingdom	For Union Steamship Company of Japan.
March	Yakoba	Steamship	Messrs. D. J. Dunlop & Co.	Glasgow	United Kingdom	For National African Company (Limited).
1 April	Provence	Steamship	Forges et Chantiers de la Méditerranée	La Seyne	France	For Soc. Generale de Transports Maritimes a Vapeur
2 April	Katey	Tug	Messrs. J. Mackenzie & Co.	Leith	United Kingdom	For private owner.
2 April	The Duchess of Albany	Steamboat		Durham	United Kingdom	For William Houston.
9 April	Benito	Steamship	Messrs. David J. Dunlop & Co.	Port Glasgow	United Kingdom	For British and African Steam Navigation Co. (Limited).
9 April	Lion	Lion-class gunboat	Chantiers et Ateliers Augustin Normand	Le Havre	France	For French Navy.
9 April	Duchess of Edinburgh	Paddle steamer	Messrs. Aitken & Mansel	Whiteinch	United Kingdom	For London, Brighton and South Coast Railway & London and South Western Railway.
10 April	Brownrigg	Merchantman	Messrs. Russell & Co.	Greenock	United Kingdom	For John Houston.
10 April	Fortescue	Steamship	Messrs. Murdoch & Murray	Port Glasgow	United Kingdom	For Messrs. John Holman & Sons.
10 April	Straits of Gibraltar	Steamship	Ayr Shipbuilding Company	Ayr	United Kingdom	For Messrs. Neil Maclean & Company.
11 April	Australasian	Steamship	Robert Napier & Co.	Govan	United Kingdom	For George Thompson & Co.
11 April	Tilley	Steam trawler	Abercorn Shipbuilding	Paisley	United Kingdom	For private owner.
12 April	Belle	Steamship	Messrs. Finch & Co. Ltd.	Chepstow	United Kingdom	For Messrs. Bellamy & Co.
12 April	Dolphin	Gunboat	John Roach & Sons	Chester, Pennsylvania	United States	For United States Navy
12 April	Floridian	Cargo ship	Harland & Wolff	Belfast	United Kingdom	For West India Shipping Co.
14 April	Bournemouth	Paddle steamer	Messrs. Ramage & Ferguson	Leith	United Kingdom	For Bournemouth, Swanage & Poole Company (Limited).
14 April	Clansman	Steamship	Messrs. Blackwood & Gordon	Port Glasgow	United Kingdom	For Northern Steamship Company.
15 April	Nevasa	Steamship	Messrs. Denny & Bros.	Dumbarton	United Kingdom	For British India Steam Navigation Company (Limited).
15 April	Wishistri	Steamship	Messrs. Dobson & Charles	Grangemouth	United Kingdom	For private owner.
17 April	Clio	Steamship	Messrs. Murdoch & Murray	Port Glasgow	United Kingdom	For Wasa Nordsjo Angbats Aktie Bolag.
17 April	Dunolly	Sailing ship	Messrs. Charles Connell & Co.	Glasgow	United Kingdom	For John Brown.
19 April	Alice M. Craig	Barque	Messrs. Workman, Clarke & Co.	Belfast	United Kingdom	For Alice M. Craig Shipowning Company (Limited).
25 April	Gulliver	Tug	Messrs. Napier, Shanks & Bell	Yoker	United Kingdom	For Clyde Shipping Company.
25 April	Ypane	Schooner	Messrs. John Fullerton & Co.	Merksworth	United Kingdom	For Lloyd Argentino.
26 April	Australia	Steamship	Messrs. Burrell & Son	Dumbarton	United Kingdom	For Mr. M'Farlane.
26 April	Briton	Steamship	Messrs. Morton & Co.	Leith	United Kingdom	For E. Nicole.
26 April	Chiripa	Yacht	Messrs. Campbell P. Ogilvie & Co.	Slaughden	United Kingdom	For A. J. Corry.
26 April	Delvin	Yacht	Mr. Fyffe	Fairlie	United Kingdom	For Mr. Jameson.
26 April	Faithlie	Steamship	Messrs. Alexander Hall & Co.	Aberdeen	United Kingdom	For Fraserburgh and Baltic Steamship Company.
26 April	Polyanthus	Yawl	Messr. Camper & Nicholson	Gosport	United Kingdom	For R. H. Baillie.
26 April	Swift	Steamship	The Sunderland Shipbuilding Co.	Sunderland	United Kingdom	For Messrs. William H. H. Hutchinson & Son.
27 April	City of Edinburgh	Fishing smack	Mr. McCann	Hull	United Kingdom	For R. Simpson & Co.
28 April	Saturno	Paddle Steamer	Messrs. A. & J. Inglis	Pointhouse	United Kingdom	For Thomas Elsee.
28 April	Slaney	Steamship	W. Allsup & Sons	Preston	United Kingdom	For John Bacon.
28 April	Strathcathro	Steamship	Messrs. J. M'Arthur & Co.	Abbotsinch	United Kingdom	For Messrs. James Hay & Sons.
29 April	Chester	Steamship	Edward Withy & Co.	Hartlepool	United Kingdom	For Manchester, Sheffield and Lincolnshire Railway.
29 April	Duchess of Connaught	Paddle steamer	Aitken & Mansel	Whiteinch	United Kingdom	For London, Brighton and South Coast Railway & London and South Western Railway.
29 April	Galatea	Merchantman	Messrs. Robert Duncan & Co.	Port Glasgow	United Kingdom	For Colin S. Caird.
29 April	Holt Hill	clipper	Messrs. W. H. Potter & Son	Liverpool	United Kingdom	For William Price.
29 April	Mitsu Maru	Steamship	Sandpoint Shipbuilding	Dumbarton	United Kingdom	For Union Steam Navigaton Company of Japan.
29 April	Rona	Steamship	Messrs. Barclay, Curle & Co.	Whiteinch	United Kingdom	For Leith, Hull, and Hamburg Steam Navigation Company.
29 April	No. 3	Hopper Barge	Bute Shipbuilding and Engineering Dry Dock Company (Limited)	Cardiff	United Kingdom	For Marquess of Bute's Trustees.
29 April	Ville de Tunis	Steamship	CGT Chantiers et Ateliers de Penhoët	Saint-Nazaire	France	For Compagnie Générale Transatlantique
30 April	Henriette	Cutter	Messrs. Camper & Nicholson	Gosport	United Kingdom	For G. L. Watson.
30 April	Snipe	Steamship	Campbeltown Shipbuilding Company	Campbeltown	United Kingdom	For Jersey Steamship Company.
April	Galatea	Brigantine	R. A. Ayles	Weymouth	United Kingdom	For Edwin J. Duder.
April	Genesta	Cutter	Messrs. D. & W. Henderson & Co.	Meadowside	United Kingdom	For Sir Richard Sutton.
April	Jeanie Deans	Paddle steamer	Messrs. Barclay, Curle & Co.	Whiteinch	United Kingdom	For North British Steam Packet Company.
April	Mutsu Maru	Steamship	Messrs. Henry Murray & Co.	Dumbarton	United Kingdom	For Union Steam Navigation Company of Japan.
3 May	Countess of Bantry	Steamship	Messrs. Workman, Clarke & Co.	Belfast	United Kingdom	For J. W. Payne.
3 May	Credo	Steamship	William S. Cumming	Monkland Canal	United Kingdom	For Messrs. Pile & Co.
6 May	Gayundah	Flat-iron gunboat	Sir W. G. Armstrong Mitchell & Co.	Elswick	United Kingdom	For Queensland Maritime Defence Force.
6 May	Paluma	Flat-iron gunboat	Sir W. G. Armstrong Mitchell & Co.	Elswick	United Kingdom	For Queensland Maritime Defence Force.
7 May	Cormorant	Steam trawler	Messrs. Earle's Shipbuilding and Engineering Company, Limited	Hull	United Kingdom	For Great Grimsby Ice Company Limited.
7 May	Gannet	Steam trawler	Messrs. Earle's Shipbuilding and Engineering Company, Limited	Hull	United Kingdom	For Great Grimsby Ice Company Limited.
7 May	Gor	Gor-class gunboat	Karljohansverns Verft	Horten	Norway	For Royal Norwegian Navy.
7 May	Little England	Tug	Castle Steel and Iron Works	Milford Haven	United Kingdom	For W. Alexander.
7 May	Llantheny	Steamship	Usk Shipbuilding Company	Newport	United Kingdom	For Messrs. Jones, Brooks & Co.
8 May	Fusée	Fusée-class gunboat	Arsenal de Lorient	Lorient	France	For French Navy
10 May	Médoc	Steamship	Forges et Chantiers de la Méditerranée	La Seyne	France	For Cie. des Messageries Maritimes
10 May	Carissima	Cutter	William Fife	Fairlie	United Kingdom	For George M'Roberts.
10 May	Celtic Monarch	Merchantman	Messrs. Thomas Royden & Sons	Liverpool	United Kingdom	For Messrs. Pile & Co., or Messrs. Parry, Jones & Co.
12 May	Adeh	Paddle steamer	Messrs. Blackwood & Gordon	Port Glasgow	United Kingdom	For Rajah Brooke of Sarawak.
12 May	Mon Ame	Fishing boat	Messrs. Scott	Montrose	United Kingdom	For private owner.
12 May	Troop	Merchantman	Messrs. A. M'Millan & Son	Dumbarton	United Kingdom	For Messrs. Troop & Son.
14 May	Craigburn	Merchantman	William Thompson	Partick	United Kingdom	For Messrs. Shankland & Co.
14 May	Skirmisher	Tug and tender	J. & G. Thomson	Clydebank	United Kingdom	For Cunard Line.
15 May	Electro	Steamship	Messrs. Earle's Shipbuilding and Engineering Company Limited	Hull	United Kingdom	For Messrs. Thomas Ward, Sons & Co.
15 May	Moleque	Tug	W. S. Cumming	Monkland Canal	United Kingdom	For private owner.
17 May	Lord O'Neill	Cargo ship	Harland & Wolff	Belfast	United Kingdom	For Irish Shipowners Ltd.
17 May	Tasmania	Steamship	Caird & Co.	Greenoch	United Kingdom	For Peninsular and Oriental Steam Navigation Company.
20 May	Garonne	Steamship	Messrs. C. S. Swan & Hunter	Wallsend	United Kingdom	For Cardiff Steamship Company (Limited).
23 May	Palmer	Steamship	Messrs. John Fullerton & Co.	Merksworth	United Kingdom	For Australian Steam Navigation Company.
24 May	Gratitude	Steamship	Robert Thompson & Sons	Southwick	United Kingdom	For Gratitude Steamship Co. Ltd.
24 May	Invermay	Steamship	Messrs. T. Turnbull & Sons	Whitby	United Kingdom	For private owner.
24 May	Lady Anne	Steam yacht	Messrs. Ramage & Ferguson	Leith	United Kingdom	For W. B. Walker.
24 May	Miranda	Steamship	Messrs. Wigham, Richardson & Co.	Newcastle upon Tyne	United Kingdom	For Messrs. C. T. Bowring & Co.
24 May	Peveril	Steamship	Barrow Ship Building Co. Ltd.	Barrow-in-Furness	United Kingdom	For Isle of Man Steam Packet Company.
24 May	Rothiemay	Steamship	Blyth Shipbuilding Co. Ltd	Blyth	United Kingdom	For Red 'R' Steamship Co. Ltd.
25 May	Milan	Unprotected cruiser	Ateliers et Chantiers de la Loire	Lormont	France	For French Navy]
26 May	General Picton	Barque	S. P. Austin & Son	Sunderland	United Kingdom	For T. Morris.
26 May	Irex	Cutter	Mr. Fay	Northam	United Kingdom	For Mr. Jamieson.
26 May	Pheasant	Steamship	Messrs. E. Finch & Co.	Chepstow	United Kingdom	For R. Thompson.
26 May	Sfax	Cruiser	Arsenal de Brest	Brest	France	For French Navy.
26 May	Speedwell	Steam trawler	Messrs. M. Pearse & Co.	Stockton-on-Tees	United Kingdom	For private owner.
27 May	Abertawe	Steamship	Palmers' Shipbuilding and Iron Co. Limited	Jarrow	United Kingdom	For Messrs. Letricheux & David.
27 May	Boileau	Steamship	Palmer's Shipbuilding and Iron Co. Limited	Howdon	United Kingdom	For Messrs. L & H. Gueret.
27 May	Satsuma Maru	Steamship	Messrs. Napier, Shanks & Bell	Yoker	United Kingdom	For Union Steam Navigation Company of Japan.
29 May	Centaure	Steamship	Messrs. David J. Dunlop & Co.	Port Glasgow	United Kingdom	For Companie de Transportes Fluviales á Vapor de Monte Video.
29 May	County of Yarmouth	Full-rigged ship	Hilaire P. Boudreau	Belliveau's Cove	Canada	For William D. Lovitt.
29 May	Thistle	Steamship	Messrs. David & William Henderson & Co.	Meadowside	United Kingdom	For Glasgow and Londonderry Steam Packet Company.
29 May	Workman	Steamship	Messrs. Workman, Clarke & Co.	Belfast	United Kingdom	For private owner.
May	Cressida	Steam yacht	Messrs. A. & J. Inglis	Pointhouse	United Kingdom	For J. Inglis Jr.
May	Deium	Cutter	William Fife	Fairlie	United Kingdom	For R. D. Jameson.
May	Engineer	Steamship	Messrs. Murdoch & Murray	Port Glasgow	United Kingdom	For Messrs. Tatham & Co.
May	Falls of Earn	Merchantman	Messrs. Russell & Co.	Greenock	United Kingdom	For Messrs. Wright & Brackenridge.
May	Galathée	Barque	Messrs. Alexander Stephen & Sons	Linthouse	United Kingdom	For A. C. Le Quellec.
May	Idzumo Maru	Steamship	Messrs. Napier, Shanks & Bell	Yoker	United Kingdom	For Kiodo Unyu Kaisha.
May	Jehuy	Schooner	Messrs. John Fullerton & Co.	Paisley	United Kingdom	For Argentine Lloyds.
May	Kii Maru	Steamship	London and Glasgow Engineering and Shipbuilding Company	Glasgow	United Kingdom	For Kiodo Unyu Kaisha.
May	Marquerite	Cutter	William Fife	Fairlie	United Kingdom	For J. B. Macindoe.
May	Resolute	Steam trawler	Messrs. M. Pearse & Co.	Stockton-on-Tees	United Kingdom	For private owner.
May	Rio Bueno	Steamship	Messrs. Burrell & Son	Dumbarton	United Kingdom	For Clyde Line.
May	South Cambria	Steamship	Blyth Shipbuilding Co. Ltd	Blyth	United Kingdom	For South Cambria Steamship Co. Ltd.
May	Ella	Steamship	North of England Shipbuilding Company	Pallion	United Kingdom	For private owner.
May	The Linnet	Lugger	S. Richards	Lowestoft	United Kingdom	For C. T. Day.
May	Volador	Barquentine	Troon Shipbuilding Company	Troon	United Kingdom	For Thomas Steele.
4 June	Edmondsley	Steamship	Joseph L. Thompson & Sons	North Sands	United Kingdom	For Tyzack & Branfoot.
5 June	Dresden	Steamship	W. B. Thompson	Dundee	United Kingdom	For York Coal and Steamship Company Limited.
7 June	Benin	Cargo ship	Harland & Wolff	Belfast	United Kingdom	For African Steamship Co.
7 June	Habsburg	Steamship		Bregenz	Austria-Hungary	For private owner.
9 June	Courlis	Steam trawler	Messrs. Hawthorn & Co	Leith	United Kingdom	For H. S. Johnson & Co.
9 June	Enterprise	Fish carrier	Messrs. Earle's Shipbuilding and Engineering Company	Hull	United Kingdom	For W. Burdett-Coutts.
9 June	Matlock	Steamship	Messrs. W. Harkness & Son	Middlesbrough	United Kingdom	For private owner.
10 June	Apollo	Barque	Messrs. W. Gray & Co.	West Hartlepool	United Kingdom	For Herren Adolf Schiff.
10 June	Bankhall	Barque	Osbourne, Graham & Co.	North Hylton	United Kingdom	For W. Just & Co.
10 June	Dunlin	Steam trawler	Messrs. Marr & Co.	Leith	United Kingdom	For J. L. Cunliffe.
10 June	Vril	Steamship	Messrs. M'Knight & M'Credie	Ayr	United Kingdom	For D. Macdonald.
11 June	British Isles	Full-rigged ship	Messrs. John Reid & Co.	Port Glasgow	United Kingdom	For British Shipowners' Company (Limited).
11 June	Esteban de Antunano	Steamship	James Laing	Deptford	United Kingdom	For Compania Mexicana Navigation.
11 June	Goole No. 5	Steamship	Mr. Scott	Goole	United Kingdom	For Goole and Hull Steam Towing Company.
12 June	Ashton	Steamship	Edward Withy & Co.	Hartlepool	United Kingdom	For Manchester, Sheffield and Lincolnshire Railway.
12 June	Gran Chaco Argentino	Steamship	Messrs. Aitken & Mansel	Whiteinch	United Kingdom	For Messrs. Tarrado & Molero.
12 June	Mino Maru	Steamship	James Crawford	Dumbarton	United Kingdom	For Union Steam Navigation Company of Japan.
12 June	Siberian	Steamship	Messrs. Dobie & Co. / Govan Shipbuilding Company	Govan	United Kingdom	For Allan Line.
12 June	Thorsa	Steamship	Messrs. Barclay, Curle & Co.	Whiteinch	United Kingdom	For Leith, Hull and Hamburg Steam Packet Company.
13 June	Arecuna	Steamship	Messrs. J. & G. Thomson	Clydebank	United Kingdom	For Messrs. David Caw & Co.
14 June	Apipe	Schooner	Messrs. Murdoch & Murray	Port Glasgow	United Kingdom	For Argentine Lloyd's.
14 June	Pirate	Steamship	Messrs. Scott & Co.	Bowling	United Kingdom	For Messrs. William M'Lachlan & Co.
16 June	Elm	Steamship	Messrs. A. & J. Inglis	Pointhouse	United Kingdom	For Messrs. Alexander A. Laird & Co., or Glasgow and Londonderry Steam Packet Company.
18 June	Elliott and Jeffery	Steamship	Messrs. Elliott & Jeffery	Cardiff	United Kingdom	For Messrss. Elliott and Jeffery.
21 June	Parà é Amazones	Paddle steamer	Messrs. A. Leslie & Co.	Hebburn	United Kingdom	For Señor Figueredo.
23 June	Calliope	Calypso-class corvette	Portsmouth Dockyard	Portsmouth	United Kingdom	For Royal Navy.
23 June	Elizabeth Bennett	Pram	Brundrit & Co.	Runcorn	United Kingdom	For Allan Green & Co.
23 June	Mariner	Mariner-class gunvessel	Devonport Dockyard	Devonport	United Kingdom	For Royal Navy.
24 June	Ardmellie	Steamship	Messrs. Hall, Russell & Co.	Footdee	United Kingdom	For Messrs. Adam & Co.
24 June	Georgie	Steamship	Forges et Chantiers de la Méditerranée	Le Havre	France	For Paquet, N., & Cie.
24 June	Carmen	Steam yacht	Messrs. John Reid & Co.	Port Glasgow	United Kingdom	For L. Llewellyn.
24 June	Countess of Jersey	Pilot boat	Mr. Peters	Briton Ferry	United Kingdom	For private owner.
24 June	L.J.J.	Pilot cutter	Messrs. Davies & Plain	Cardiff	United Kingdom	For Lewis Jones.
24 June	Onward	Fishing boat	Mr. Duncan	Macduff	United Kingdom	For James Falconer.
24 June	Portia	Steamship	Messrs. Wigham, Richardson & Co.	Newcastle upon Tyne	United Kingdom	For Messrs C. T. Bowring & Co.
24 June	The Newcastle	Steam trawler	Mr. Charlton	Grimsby	United Kingdom	For private owner.
25 June	Marchioness	Steamship	Short Bros.	Pallion	United Kingdom	For Taylor & Sanderson.
25 June	Umbria	Ocean liner	John Elder & Co	Glasgow	United Kingdom	For Cunard Line.
26 June	Atlantis	Steamship	Messrs. James & George Thompson	Clydebank	United Kingdom	For Messrs. David Caw & Co., or Messrs. Scrutton, Sons & Co.
26 June	Charles Morand	Steamship	Messrs. Charles Connell & Co.	Scotstoun	United Kingdom	For Watt & Spriggs.
27 June	Effort	Steamship	Messrs. William Swan & Co.	Maryhill	United Kingdom	For Messrs. M'Creath & Hendry.
28 June	Meath	Steamship	Messrs. Laird Bros.	Birkenhead	United Kingdom	For City of Dublin Steam Packet Company.
June	Arawa	Steamship	Messrs. William Denny & Bros.	Dumbarton	United Kingdom	For Shaw, Savill & Albion Line.
June	Dermonse	Yawl	William Fyfe	Fairlie	United Kingdom	For private owner.
June	Jumna	Paddle tug	Thomas Hepple	North Shields	United Kingdom	For David Bevan.
June	Languedoc	Steamship	W. B. Thompson	Whiteinch	United Kingdom	For Société Générale de Transportes Maritimes à Vapeur.
June	R.T.B.	Ketch	Richard T. Blackmore.	Appledore	United Kingdom	For Richard T. Blackmore.
June	Shiruvati	Steamship	Messrs. Duncan & Co.	Port Glasgow	United Kingdom	For private owner.
June	Warden	Lighthouse tender	Messrs. T. B. Seath & Co.	Rutherglen	United Kingdom	For Trinity House.
5 July	Scheldt	Steamship	Messrs. C. Hill & Son	Bristol	United Kingdom	For Cardiff Steamship Company.
9 July	Afonso de Albuquerque	Cruiser	Thames Ironworks and Shipbuilding Company	Blackwall, London	United Kingdom	For Portuguese Navy.
9 July	Bay Fisher	Steamship	Messrs. MacIlwaine, Lewis & Co.	Belfast	United Kingdom	For Messrs. Fisher & Sons.
9 July	Regina Margherita	Steamship	Messrs. A. M'Millan & Sons	Dumbarton	United Kingdom	For private owner.
9 July	Rosales	Schooner	Messrs. Murdoch & Murray	Port Glasgow	United Kingdom	For Argentine Lloyd's.
9 July	Tampico	Schooner	Messrs. Alexander Stephen & Sons	Linthouse	United Kingdom	For MM Jencquel Frères.
10 July	Allen Gardiner	Steamship	Robert Rodger	Port Glasgow	United Kingdom	For South American Missionary Society.
10 July	Gem	Fishing boat		Banff	United Kingdom	For James Wilson.
10 July	Ouse	Cargo liner	William Dobson & Co.	Walker	United Kingdom	For Goole Steam Shipping Company.
10 July	San Martin	Paddle steamer	Messrs. Napier, Shanks & Bell	Yoker	United Kingdom	For Lloyd's Argentin.
10 July	Storm Cock	Steamship	Messrs. E. Finch & Co. (Limited)	Chepstow	United Kingdom	For Messrs. William Williams & Son.
16 July	Mosquito	Torpedo boat	John I. Thornycroft & Company	Cheswick	United Kingdom	For Queensland Maritime Defence Force.
12 July	Alpha	Steamship	Messrs. W. Simons & Co.	Renfrew	United Kingdom	For Liverpool Corporation.
12 July	Wellington	Steamship	Messrs. Burrell & Son.	Dumbarton	United Kingdom	For Messrs. John Terry & Co.
15 July	Magnus	Steamship	Messrs. Lobnitz & Co.	Renfrew	United Kingdom	For L. H. Carl.
19 July	Otter	Patrol vessel	Ramage and Ferguson	Leith	United Kingdom	For Queensland Maritime Defence Force.
22 July	Æolus	Steamship	Messrs. W. Gray & Co.	West Hartlepool	United Kingdom	For Messrs. M. Rickinson & Co.
22 July	Carl	Barque	Robert Thompson & Sons	Sunderland	United Kingdom	For C. H. H. Winters.
22 July	Kalinadi	Steamship	Messrs. Robert Duncan & Co.	Port Glasgow	United Kingdom	For Messrs. Dunsmuir & Jackson.
22 July	Unnamed	Tug	Messrs. Bainbridge & Beckwith	Swansea	United Kingdom	For Messrs. Poingdestre & Mesnier.
23 July	Snowdrop	Barque	William Pickersgill & Sons	Southwick	United Kingdom	For J. Tedford & Co.
23 July	Wynnstay	Merchantman	Messrs. Russell & Co.	Port Glasgow	United Kingdom	For Messrs. D. W. Davies & Co.
24 July	Dankali	Tug	Bainbridge & Beckwith	Shoreham-by-Sea	United Kingdom	For J. Mesnier.
24 July	Espord	Schooner	Messrs. Murdoch & Murray	Port Glasgow	United Kingdom	For Argentine Lloyd's.
24 July	Pegasus	Merchantman	Messrs. W. H. Potter & Sons	Liverpool	United Kingdom	For Messrs. W. T. Dixon & Sons.
24 July	Sparkle	Steamship	D. P. Garbutt	Hull	United Kingdom	For John W. Smith.
26 July	General Roberts	Merchantman	Messrs. Russell & Co.	Greenock	United Kingdom	For L. Davies.
26 July	Lord Lansdowne	Cargo ship	Harland & Wolff	Belfast	United Kingdom	For Irish Shipowners Ltd.
28 July	Cawdon Low	Merchantman	Messrs. Campbell, McIntosh & Bowstead	Scotswood	United Kingdom	For private owner. Ran into the river bank on being launched.
29 July	Queen	Steam launch	Messrs. Camper & Nicholson	Gosport	United Kingdom	For Gosport and Portsea Watermen's Steam Launch Company.
July	Beta	Steamship	Messrs. W. Simons & Co.	Renfrew	United Kingdom	For Liverpool Corporation.
July	Clutha No. 5	Steamship	Messrs. T. B. Seath & Co	Rutherglen	United Kingdom	For Clyde Trustees.
July	Coila	Steamship	Messrs. M'Knight & M'Creadie	Ayr	United Kingdom	For Messrs. S. M'Laren & Co.
July	Herald	Steamship	Messrs. Pearce Bros.	Dundee	United Kingdom	For Messrs. Stone Bros.
July	No. 9	Hopper Dredger	Messrs. W. Simons & Co.	Renfrew	United Kingdom	For Mersey Docks and Harbour Board.
July	251	Steam launch	Messrs. T. B. Seath & Co.	Rutherglen	United Kingdom	For Messrs. James Finlay & Co.
4 August	J. S. M.	Lugger	Mr. Sparham and Mr. Rant	Lowestoft	United Kingdom	For Messrs. Macey.
5 August	Main	Merchantman	Messrs. Russell & Co.	Greenoc	United Kingdom	For James Nourse.
5 August	Palgrave	Full-rigged ship	Messrs. William Hamilton & Co.	Port Glasgow	United Kingdom	For Messrs. William Hamilton & Co.
6 August	Racer	Mariner-class gunvessel	Devonport Dockyard	Devonport	United Kingdom	For Royal Navy.
7 August	Bala	Steamship	Messrs. W. Gray & Co.	West Hartlepool	United Kingdom	For Messrs. Evan Thomas, Radcliffe & Co.
7 August	Chusan	Steamship	Messrs. Caird & Co.	Greenock	United Kingdom	For Peninsular and Oriental Steam Navigation Company. Ran aground on being launched.
7 August	Dredger No. 123	Dredger	Barrow Ship Building Co. Ltd.	Barrow-in-Furness	United Kingdom	For private owner.
7 August	España	Hopper dredger	Messrs. W. Simons & Co.	Renfrew	United Kingdom	For Junta del Puerto Valencia.
7 August	Olympo	Steamship	Messrs. A. & J. Inglis	Pointhouse	United Kingdom	For Thomas Elsee.
8 August	Magellan	Magellan-class transport	Ateliers et Chantiers de la Loire	Saint-Nazaire	France	For French Navy.
8 August	Ben Nevis	Steamship	Abercorn Shipbuilding Company	Paisley	United Kingdom	For D. P. M'Donald.
9 August	Liberal	Gunvessel	Messrs. Laird Bros.	Birkenhead	United Kingdom	For Portuguese Navy.
9 August	Ruggiero di Lauria	Ruggiero di Lauria-class ironclad	Castellammare Shipyard	Castellammare di Stabia	Italy	For Regia Marina.
9 August	Sobralense	Steamship	Barrow Ship Building Co. Ltd.	Barrow-in-Furness	United Kingdom	For R. Singlehurst & Co.
9 August	Zaire	Gunvessel	Messrs. Laird Bros	Birkenhead	United Kingdom	For Portuguese Navy.
11 August	Florencia	Barquentine	The Sunderland Shipbuilding Co. Ltd.	Sunderland	United Kingdom	For Mrs. E. H. Langworthy, or Mr. E. M. Langworthy.
12 August	Bellinger	Steamship	Messrs. J. M'Arthur & Co.	Abbotsinch	United Kingdom	For G. W. Nicholl.
12 August	Hilda	Steamship	John Fullerton & Co.	Merksworth	United Kingdom	For Asia Minor Steamship Company.
13 August	Cairnsmore	Barque	Messrs. John Reid & Co.	Port Glasgow	United Kingdom	For Messrs. Nicholson & M'Gill.
14 August	Matapan	Steamship	Forges et Chantiers de la Méditerranée	La Seyne	France	For Cie. des Messageries Maritimes
19 August	Güemes	Tug	Messrs. Blackwood & Gordon	Port Glasgow	United Kingdom	For Lloyd's Argentine.
19 August	Martello	Steamship	Earle's Shipbuilding and Engineering Company	Hull	United Kingdom	For Messrs. Thomas Wilson, Sons & Co.
21 August	Berry	Steamship	W. B. Thompson	Whiteinch	United Kingdom	For Société Générale de Transports Maritimes à Vapeur.
21 August	Bordeaux	Steamship	Messrs. Ramage & Ferguson	Leith	United Kingdom	For Loire and Thames Transit Company (Limited).
21 August	Earn	Steamship	Messrs. Blackwood & Gordon	Port Glasgow	United Kingdom	For David Gordon.
21 August	Mostyn	Steamship		Glasson Dock	United Kingdom	For private owner.
21 August	Newcastle	Paddle steamer		Kinghorn	United Kingdom	For Newcastle Steamship Company (Limited).
22 August	Drumpellier	Troopship	Messrs. William Hamilton & Co	Port Glasgow	United Kingdom	For Messrs. Henry Ellis & Sons.
22 August	Gairloch	Steamship	Messrs. Blackwood & Gordon	Port Glasgow	United Kingdom	For Northern Steamship Company.
23 August	Crocus	Ferry	Messrs. Allsup & Sons	Preston	United Kingdom	For Wallasey Local Board.
23 August	Glentaner	Steamship	Messrs. Hall, Russell & Co.	Footdee	United Kingdom	For Aberdeen Glen Line Steamship Company.
23 August	Llewellyn	Steamship	Messrs. Alexander Jack & Co.	Seacombe	United Kingdom	For Queensland Government.
23 August	Miriam	Lighter	George Brown	Hull	United Kingdom	For P. Simpson.
23 August	Nurjahan	Cargo ship	Harland & Wolff	Belfast	United Kingdom	For Asiatic Steamship Co.
23 August	Robinia	Steamship	Tyne Iron Shipbuilding Company, Limited	Willington-on-Tyne	United Kingdom	For Messrs. Joseph Robinson & Sons.
26 August	Valencia	Hopper dredger	Messrs. W. Simons & Co.	Renfrew	United Kingdom	For Junta del Puerto Valencia.
28 August	Kirkcudbrightshire	Merchantman	Messrs. Russell & Co.	Greenock	United Kingdom	For Shire Line.
August	Belgrave	Full-rigged ship	William Hamilton and Company	Port Glasgow	United Kingdom	For private owner. At launch, the largest sailing ship in the world.
August	Chusan	Steamship	Messrs. Caird & Co.	Greenock	United Kingdom	For Peninsular and Oriental Steam Navigation Company.
August	Clutha No. 6	Steamship	Messrs. T. B. Seath	Rutherglen	United Kingdom	For Clyde Trustees.
August	Haruna Maru	Steamship	Messrs. H. M'Intyre & Co.	Paisley	United Kingdom	For Union Steamship Company of Japan.
August	Higo Maru	Steamship	London and Glasgow Engineering and Shipbuilding Company	Govan	United Kingdom	For Kiodo Unyo Kaisha.
August	Main	Merchantman	Russell & Co.	Port Glasgow	United Kingdom	For Nourse Line.
August	William Findley	Steam trawler	Messrs. Wouldhave & Son	North Shields	United Kingdom	For Mr. Oaten.
4 September	Carnmoney	Barque	Messrs. Workman, Clarke & Co.	Belfast	United Kingdom	For Carnmone Ship Company, Limited.
4 September	Hedworth	Steamship	Messrs. S. P. Austin & Sons	Sunderland	United Kingdom	For E. T. Nisbet & others.
4 September	Hugh Bell	Ferry	Hepple & Co.	North Shields	United Kingdom	For Middlesbrough Corporation.
4 September	Rivas	Steamship	Messrs. Alexander Stephen & Sons	Linthouse	United Kingdom	For Señor Martinez de las Rivas.
6 September	Acorn	Mariner-class gunvessel		Pembroke Dockyard	United Kingdom	For Royal Navy.
6 September	Gannet	Paddle tug	Barrow Ship Building Co. Ltd.	Barrow-in-Furness	United Kingdom	For Melbourne Harbour Trust Commissioners.
6 September	Margarita	Barque	Messrs. John Knox & Co.	South Hylton	United Kingdom	For Messrs. Pile & Co.
8 September	Kaikuro	Steamship	Messrs. John Elder & Co.	Fairfield	United Kingdom	For New Zealand Shipping Company (Limited).
8 September	Maelgwyn	Barque	William Doxford & Sons	Pallion	United Kingdom	For Robert Thomas & Co.
8 September	Tainui	Steamship	Messrs. William Denny & Bros.	Dumbarton	United Kingdom	For Shaw, Savill and Albion Line.
8 September	Trent	Steamship	Messrs. Head and Riley	Hull	United Kingdom	For Gainsborough United Steam Packet Company, Limited.
9 September	Gracie	Trawling smack	Messrs. Cottingham Bros.	Goole	United Kingdom	For J. Board.
9 September	Grandholm	Steamship	Messrs. Hall, Russell & Co.	Footdee	United Kingdom	For Messrs. William Leslie & Co.
9 September	Scotsman	Barque	Palmer's Shipbuilding and Iron Company Limited	Jarrow	United Kingdom	For Mr. Gardiner.
11 September	James Mutter	Steamship	Messrs. Scott & Co.	Bowling	United Kingdom	For Messrs. W. & J. Mutter.
17 September	Australasia	Steamship	James Davidson	West Bay City, Michigan	United States	For Davidson Steamship Company.
18 September	Mackay-Bennett	Cable layer	John Elder & Co	Glasgow	United Kingdom	For Commercial Cable Company.
20 September	Bisagno	Steamship	Messrs. Burrell & Son	Dumbarton	United Kingdom	For Società Italiana di Transporti Marittimi Raggio & Co.
20 September	County of York	Steamship	Barrow Ship Building Co. Ltd.	Barrow-in-Furness	United Kingdom	For Taylor, Abrahams & Co.
20 September	Edendale	Steamship	Messrs. H. S. Edwards & Son	Howdon-on-Tyne	United Kingdom	For C. R. Irving.
20 September	Lodestar	Merchantman	Messrs. Gray & Co.	West Hartlepool	United Kingdom	For Messrs. John Liderst & Son.
20 September	Etruria	Ocean liner	John Elder & Co.	Glasgow	United Kingdom	For Cunard Line.
20 September	Scorpion	Lion-class gunboat	Forges et Chantiers de la Méditerranée	Le Havre	France	For French Navy
20 September	Snowdrop	Ferry	Messrs. Allsup & Sons	Preston	United Kingdom	For Wallasey Local Board.
22 September	Albion	Steamship	Messrs. Cochrane, Hamilton & Cooper	Beverley	United Kingdom	For Mr. Wood.
22 September	Alpha	Fishing smack	Messrs. Cochrarnd, Hamilton & Cooper	Beverley	United Kingdom	For Mr. Hillyer.
22 September	Ohau	Steamship	Messrs. William Denny & Bros.	Dumbarton	United Kingdom	For Union Steamship Company of New Zealand.
22 September	St. Cuthbert	Barque	Messrs. Barclay, Curle & Co.	Whiteinch	United Kingdom	For Alexander Rae.
22 September	Wendur	Merchantman	Messrs. Charles Connell & Co.	Scotstoun	United Kingdom	For Messrs. A. Mackay & Co.
23 September	Bulldog	Salvage tug	Messrs. E. Finch & Company, Limited	Chepstow	United Kingdom	For Bristol Docks Committee.
24 September	Derwent	Steamship	Messrs. William Gray & Co.	West Hartlepool	United Kingdom	For Scarborough Shipping Co.
24 September	Eurotus	Cruiser	Messrs. Archibald M'Millan & Son	Dumbarton	United Kingdom	For Royal Hellenic Navy.
24 September	Juliett Marie	Fishing trawler	Messrs. D. Allen & Co.	Grantyon	United Kingdom	For M. Silvestre.
24 September	Peneus	Cruiser	Messrs. Archibald M'Millan & Son	Dumbarton	United Kingdom	For Royal Hellenic Navy.
25 September	Clackmannanshire	Merchantman	Messrs. Russell & Co.	Greenock	United Kingdom	For Shire Line.
25 September	Dalmarija	Steamship	Messrs. Murray Bros.	Dumbarton	United Kingdom	For private owner.
26 September	Dona Anna	Schooner	Messrs. Blackwood & Gordon	Port Glasgow	United Kingdom	For Amazon Steam Navigation Company (Limited).
26 September	Dona Maria	Schooner	Messrs. Blackwood & Gordon	Port Glasgow	United Kingdom	For Amazon Steam Navigation Company (Limited).
September	Australia	Electric launch	Messrs. Forrest & Co.	Millwall	United Kingdom	For Messrs. Stephens & Smith.
September	Axelhuus	Steamship	Messrs. Lobnitz & Co.	Renfrew	United Kingdom	For Messrs. Adolphus Enke.
September	Gueldborgsund	Gunboat		Copenhagen	Denmark	For Royal Danish Navy.
September	Haddingtonshire	Barque	Messrs. Russell & Co.	Port Glasgow	United Kingdom	For private owner.
September	Jessie Darling	Steamship	Messrs. Murdoch & Murray	Port Glasgow	United Kingdom	For Messrs. John Darling & Son.
September	Longavi	Merchantman	Messrs. Robert Napier & Sons	Govan	United Kingdom	For private owner.
September	Nagato Maru	Steamship	Messrs. Napier, Shanks & Bell	Yoker	United Kingdom	For Union Steam Navigation Company of Japan.
September	Parana	Merchantman	Messrs. Aitken & Mansel	Whiteinch	United Kingdom	For private owner.
September	Plata	Merchantman	Messrs. Aitken & Mansel	Whiteinch	United Kingdom	For private owner.
4 October	Belfast	Steamship	Messrs. R. Irvine & Co.	West Hartlepool	United Kingdom	For Dublin and Liverpool Screw-steamer Packet Company.
4 October	Clan Robertson	Merchantman	Messrs. Robert Duncan & Co.	Port Glasgow	United Kingdom	For Messrs. Thomas Dunlop & Sons.
4 October	Hesper	Schooner	Montgomery & Howard	Chelsea, Massachusetts	United States	For Augustus Hooper, George W. Lawler and James Smith.
4 October	Manx King	Steamship	Messrs. Richardson, Duck & Co.	South Stockton	United Kingdom	For R. G. Karran.
4 October	River Falloch	Merchantman	Messrs. Russell & Co.	Kingston	United Kingdom	For W. D. Denny.
4 October	Shagbrook	Steamship	Messrs. W. Gray & Co.	West Hartlepool	United Kingdom	For Messrs. Harris & Dixon.
4 October	Trinidad	Steamship	James Laing	Deptford	United Kingdom	For Quebec Steamship Co.
5 October	Calédonien	Magellan-class transport	Ateliers et Chantiers de la Loire	Saint-Nazaire	France	For French Navy.
6 October	Asia	Steamship	Messrs. D. & W. Henderson & Co.	Meadowside	United Kingdom	For Anchor Line.
6 October	Jasper	Schooner	C. Burt & Sons	Falmouth	United Kingdom	For Arthur Jenkyns.
6 October	Progress	Steamship	Messrs. James M'Arthur & Co.	Abbotsinch	United Kingdom	For Co-operative Wholesale Society.
7 October	Lucinda	Paddle steamer	William Denny and Brothers	Dumbarton	United Kingdom	For Queensland Government.
8 October	Carthaginan	Steamship	Govan Shipbuilding Company	Govan	United Kingdom	For Allan Line.
8 October	Kohinur	Cargo ship	Harland & Wolff	Belfast	United Kingdom	For Asiatic Steamship Co.
8 October	Lucinda	Paddle steamer	Messrs. William Denny & Bros.	Dumbarton	United Kingdom	For Queensland Government.
8 October	Martha C. Craig	Barque	Messrs. Workman, Clarke & Co.	Belfast	United Kingdom	For Barque Alice M. Craig Company, Limited.
8 October	Rodney	Admiral-class battleship	Chatham Dockyard	Chatham	United Kingdom	For Royal Navy.
9 October	Atlanta	Protected cruiser	John Roach & Sons	Chester, Pennsylvania	United States	For United States Navy.
9 October	Eusemere	Merchantman	Messrs. W. H. Potter & Sons	Liverpool	United Kingdom	For Messrs. Fisher & Sprott.
13 October	Magdalena	Schooner	Messrs. J. Knox & Co.	South Hylton	United Kingdom	For private owner.
18 October	Rossguil	Steamship	Messrs. J. M'Arthur & Co.	Abbotsinch	United Kingdom	For Earl of Leitrim.
20 October	Ocean Star	Ketch		Ramsgate	United Kingdom	For private owner.
20 October	Stuart	Coaster	W. Allsup & Sons	Preston	United Kingdom	For John Bacon.
21 October	Alpheos	Cruiser	Thames Ironworks and Shipbuilding Company	Blackwall	United Kingdom	For Royal Hellenic Navy.
21 October	Beta	Fishing trawler	Messrs. Cochrane, Hamilton & Cooper	Beverley	United Kingdom	For Mr. Hellyar.
21 October	Derwent	Merchantman	Messrs. Archibald M'Millan & Son	Dumbarton	United Kingdom	For Messrs. Devitt & Moore.
21 October	Gulf Stream	Barque	Messrs. Russell & Co.	Kingston	United Kingdom	For A. L. Polson.
21 October	Linthorpe	Ketch	Seaham Shipbuilding Co. & J. Morrice & Co	Seaham	United Kingdom	For Messrs. Warne & Shiel.
21 October	Why Not	Fishing smack	Messrs. William Ewing & Co.	Hull	United Kingdom	For Mr. Hellyer.
22 October	Edinburghshire	Barque	Messrs. Alexander Stephen & Sons	Linthouse	United Kingdom	For Messrs. T. Law & Co.
24 October	Godavari	Steamship	Messrs. Robert Duncan & Co.	Port Glasgow	United Kingdom	For Messrs. Thom & Cameron.
29 October	Persepolis	Cruiser	AG Weser	Bremen	Germany	For Royal Persian Navy.
30 October	Telephone	Sternwheeler		East Portland, Oregon	United States	For Uriah Bonser Scott and partners.
October	Scott Harley	Steamship	Messrs. Murdoch & Murray	Port Glasgow	United Kingdom	For Messrs. Scott, Harley & Co.
1 November	Pembury	Steamship	Messrs. S. & H. Morton & Co.	Leith	United Kingdom	For Messrs. Matthews & Luff.
1 November	Vityaz	Corvette	Russo-French Company	Saint Petersburg	Russia	For Imperial Russian Navy.
3 November	Elfleda	Fishing smack	Whitby and Robin Hood's Bay Dock Company	Whitby	United Kingdom	For private owner.
3 November	Violet	Paddle ferry	W. Allsup & Sons	Preston	United Kingdom	For Wallasey Local Board.
4 November	Chelsea	Steamship	Palmer Shipbuilding and Iron Company	Jarrow	United Kingdom	For River Steam Colliers Company.
5 November	Anglesey	Steamship	Messrs. William Thomas & Sons	Amlwch Port	United Kingdom	For private owner.
5 November	Pylades	Satellite-class sloop	Sheerness Dockyard	Sheerness	United Kingdom	For Royal Navy.
6 November	Herschel	Steamship	Bartram, Haswell & Co.	Sunderland	United Kingdom	For Wilkie & Turnbull.
6 November	Ituna	Steamship	Messrs. Hutson & Corbett	Grangemouth	United Kingdom	For London and Solway Steamship Company.
6 November	Mochmarry	Tug	Usk Shipbuilding	Newport	United Kingdom	For S. Little.
6 November	Morecambe Bay	Barque	Messrs. Russell & Co.	Kingston	United Kingdom	For Bay Line.
6 November	Yarrow	Sternwheeler		Alexandria	(Ottoman Empire) Ottoman Egypt	For Lord Wolseley.
13 November	Chaihuin	Steamship	David Dunlop & Co.	Port Glasgow	United Kingdom	For Adam Gruelich y Compañia.
13 November	Taupo	Steamship	Messrs. William Denny & Bros.	Dumbarton	United Kingdom	For Union Steamship Company of New Zealand (Limited).
16 November	Protector	Flat-iron gunboat	Sir W. G. Armstrong Mitchell & Co.	Elswick	United Kingdom	For South Australian Government.
18 November	Otterspool	East Indiaman	Palmer's Shipbuilding and Iron Company, Limited	Jarrow	United Kingdom	For Messrs. R. W. Leyland & Co. Ltd.
18 November	Seagull	Tug	Culzean Shipbuilding and Engineering Company	Culzean	United Kingdom	For Hull Fishing Steam Tug Company (Limited).
19 November	Aberdeen	Steamship	Barrow Ship Building Co. Ltd.	Barrow-in-Furness	United Kingdom	For private owner.
19 November	Glamorganshire	Steamship	London and Glasgow Shipbuilding and Engineering Company	Govan	United Kingdom	For Shire Line.
19 November	Rimutaka	Steamship	Messrs. John Elder & Co.	Fairfield	United Kingdom	For New Zealand Steamship Company (Limited).
20 November	Acheloos	Cruiser	Thames Ironworks and Shipbuilding Company	Blackwall	United Kingdom	For Royal Hellenic Navy.
20 November	Earl of Chatham	Steamship	Barrow Ship Building Co. Ltd.	Barrow-in-Furness	United Kingdom	For D. Brown & Sons Ltd.
20 November	Middlesex	Merchantman	Barclay, Curle & Co. (Limited)	Whiteinch	United Kingdom	For Messrs. George Marshall & Sons.
21 November	Port Chalmers	Merchantman	Messrs. Russell & Co.	Dumbarton	United Kingdom	For Port Line.
22 November	Gleneagles	Steam trawler	Messrs. Hall, Russell & Co.	Footdee	United Kingdom	For John Fleming.
November	Albatross	Steam lighter	Messrs. William Burrell & Son	Dumbarton	United Kingdom	For private owner.
November	Retreiver	Steam yacht	Messrs. Scott & Co	Greenock	United Kingdom	For J. Randall.
November	Samanco	Barque	William Pickersgill & Sons	Southwick	United Kingdom	For Samuel Wakeham & Son.
3 December	Flowergate	Steamship	Messrs. Turnbull & Sons	Whitby	United Kingdom	For private owner.
3 December	Louisa	Fishing boat	James Mowat	Gourdon	United Kingdom	For John Gall.
3 December	Madeira	Steamship	Messrs. Barclay, Curle & Co.	Whiteinch	United Kingdom	For British and African Steam Navigation Company (Limited).
4 December	Boston	Protected cruiser	John Roach & Sons	Chester, Pennsylvania	United States	For United States Navy.
4 December	Lake Superior	Steamship	Messrs. J. & G. Thompson	Clydebank	United Kingdom	For Beaver Line.
4 December	Monarch	Steamship	McIlwaine, Lewis & Co.	Belfast	United Kingdom	For Alexander King Ltd.
4 December	Prairie Queen	Tug	Messrs. Morday, Carney, and Co., Limited	Newport	United Kingdom	For Prairie Steam Towing Company.
5 December	Glenafton	Barque	Messrs. William Hamilton & Co.	Port Glasgow	United Kingdom	For Dundee Shipowners' Company.
6 December	Dubourdieu	Cruiser	Arsenal de Cherbourg	Cherbourg	France	For French Navy.
6 December	Falkland Hill	East Indiaman	Messrs. Russell & Co.	Kingston	United Kingdom	For G. R. Dickson.
9 December	Unnamed	Steamship	Messrs. Swan, Hunter & Co.	Wallsend	United Kingdom	For private owner. Ran into a caisson on being launched and was damaged.
17 December	Borneo	Steamship	Messrs. A. & J. Inglis	Pointhouse	United Kingdom	For Nederlands Indische Stoomvaart Maatschaappij.
18 December	Tokio Maru	Steamship	Messrs. Napier, Shanks & Bell	Yoker	United Kingdom	For Mitsu Bishi Steamship Company.
19 December	Isabel	Schooner	Abercorn Shipbuilding Company	Paisley	United Kingdom	For private owner.
19 December	Loodiana	Steamship	Messrs. William Denny & Bros.	Dumbarton	United Kingdom	For British India Steam Navigation Company (Limited).
19 December	Magneta	Cable ship	Messrs. R. Napier & Sons	Govan	United Kingdom	For Eastern Extension China and Australasia Telegraph Company.
20 December	Oldenburg	Coastal defence ship	A.G. Vulcan	Stettin	Germany	For Imperial German Navy.
30 December	Braemar	Barque	Messrs. A. M'Millan & Son	Dumbarton	United Kingdom	For Messrs. Thompson, Dickie & Co.
30 December	Condor	Tug	Messrs. S. & H. Morton & Co.	Leith	United Kingdom	For Messrs. Watkins & Co.
30 December	Surprise	Hopper dredger	Messrs. W. Simons & Co.	Renfrew	United Kingdom	For private owner.
30 December	Terra Nova	Whaler	Messrs. Alexander Stephen & Sons	Dundee	United Kingdom	For private owner.
December	Fame	Smack	H. Reynolds	Lowestoft	United Kingdom	For Mr. Hobbs.
Unknown date	Acara	Steamship	Messrs. A. Leslie & Co.	Hebburn	United Kingdom	For private owner.
Unknown date	Addie and Carrie	Barge		City Island, New York	United States	For private owner.
Unknown date	Advance	Tug		Williamstown	Victoria	For private owners.
Unknown date	Aeolus	Steamship	Lindholmens Mekaniska Verkstad	Gothenburg	Sweden	For private owner.
Unknown date	Airlie	Steamship	William Doxford & Sons	Pallion	United Kingdom	For Eastern & Australian Mail Steamship Co.
Unknown date	Albatross	Steamship	Palmer's Shipbuilding and Iron Company	Jarrow	United Kingdom	For private owner.
Unknown date	Albert	Gunboat	Sir WG Armstrong Mitchell & Company	Elswick	United Kingdom	For Victorian Naval Forces.
Unknown date	Albion	steam lighter	Andrew Cochrane	Selby	United Kingdom	For private owner.
Unknown date	Alfred Trower	Smack	The Strand Slipway Company	Sunderland	United Kingdom	For F. S. Gulston.
Unknown date	Alpha	Steamboat	Messrs. Hepple & Co.	North Shields	United Kingdom	For private owner.
Unknown date	Anduiza	Steamship	John Priestman & Co.	Southwick	United Kingdom	For Societa Maritma de Vizcaya.
Unknown date	Andy Gibson	Steamboat			United States	For private owner.
Unknown date	Angerton	Steamship	Messrs. W. Dobson & Co.	Low Walker	United Kingdom	For private owner.
Unknown date	Anglo-Egyptian	Steamboat	Messrs. Cochran & Co.	Birkenhead	United Kingdom	For private owner.
Unknown date	Araguay	Steamship	Messrs. A. Leslie & Co.	Hebburn	United Kingdom	For private owner.
Unknown date	Arbutus	Steamship	The Strand Slipway Company	Sunderland	United Kingdom	For Arbutus Steamship Co. Ltd.
Unknown date	Ashdell	Steamship	The North of England Shipbuilding Company	Pallion	United Kingdom	For J. Fawcett.
Unknown date	A. Stathados	Steamship	Messrs. John Readhead & Co.	South Shields	United Kingdom	For private owner.
Unknown date	Auric	Steamship	Messrs. Workman, Clarke & Co.	Belfast	United Kingdom	For private owner.
Unknown date	Avochie	Steamship	Messrs. W. Dobson & Co.	Low Walker	United Kingdom	For private owner.
Unknown date	Azopardo	Transport ship	Stabilimento Tecnico Triestino	Trieste	Austria-Hungary	For Argentine Navy.
Unknown date	Baltimore	Steamship	Macintyre & Co., Limited	Hebburn	United Kingdom	For private owner.
Unknown date	Bankdale	Merchantman	Osbourne, Graham & Co.	North Hylton	United Kingdom	For W. Just & Co.
Unknown date	Baras de Grajalia	Paddle steamer	Messrs. Laird Bros.	Birkenhead	United Kingdom	For private owner.
Unknown date	Barbara	Schooner	William Geddie	Banff	United Kingdom	For Mr. Marr.
Unknown date	Barcore	Merchantman	Richardson, Duck & Co.	South Stockton	United Kingdom	For private owner.
Unknown date	Barrowmore	Steamship	Richardson, Duck & Co.	South Stockton	United Kingdom	For private owner.
Unknown date	Basic	Steamship	Messrs. T. & W. Smith	North Shields	United Kingdom	For private owner.
Unknown date	Bee	Ferry		Newcastle	New South Wales	For Eustace Robert Hayles.
Unknown date	Benjamin Bond Cabbell	Lifeboat	James Beeching & Brothers	Great Yarmouth	United Kingdom	For Royal National Lifeboat Institution.
Unknown date	Ben Ledi	Merchantman	Osbourne, Graham & Co.	Sunderland	United Kingdom	For J. Morrison & Son.
Unknown date	Ben Leid	Steamship	James Laing	Deptford	United Kingdom	For private owner.
Unknown date	Benwell Tower	Steamship	James Laing	Deptford	United Kingdom	For Stumore, Weston & Co.
Unknown date	Black Watch	Steamship	J. R. Maxwell	South Shields	United Kingdom	For private owner.
Unknown date	Bolderaa	Steamship	James Laing	Deptford	United Kingdom	For C. M. Norwood & Co.
Unknown date	Bormida	Steamship	Messrs. Burrell & Son	Dumbarton	United Kingdom	For Società Italiana di Transporti Marittimi Raggio & Co.
Unknown date	Bosphorus	Steamboat	J. T. Eltringham	South Shields	United Kingdom	For private owner.
Unknown date	Boswedden	Steamship	Messrs. John Readhead & Co.	South Shields	United Kingdom	For private owner.
Unknown date	Brixham	Steamship	Kish, Boolds & Co	Pallion	United Kingdom	For F. W. Baddeley & Son.
Unknown date	Bucephalus	Steamship	Palmer's Shipbuilding and Iron Company	Jarrow	United Kingdom	For private owner.
Unknown date	Buster	Barquentine		Nova Scotia	Canada	For private owner.
Unknown date	Cabral	Steamship	Messrs. Laird Bros.	Birkenhead	United Kingdom	For private owner.
Unknown date	Cacouna	Steamship	Messrs. Wigham, Richardson & Co.	Low Walker	United Kingdom	For Black Diamond Steamship Company.
Unknown date	Calistoga	Merchantman	Messrs. Thomas Royden & Sons	Liverpool	United Kingdom	For private owner.
Unknown date	Campeador	Steamship	James Laing	Deptford	United Kingdom	For José Roca & Co.
Unknown date	Capulet	Steamship	Messrs. Raylton Dixon & Co.	Middlesbrough	United Kingdom	For private owner.
Unknown date	Carl	Merchantman	Messrs. Robert Thompson & Sons	Southwick	United Kingdom	For private owner.
Unknown date	Castle Rising	Steamship	Messrs. R. Craggs & Sons	Middlesbrough	United Kingdom	For private owner.
Unknown date	Challenge	Steamship	Messrs. John Readhead & Co.	South Shields	United Kingdom	For private owner.
Unknown date	Chatham	Steamship	American Shipbuilding Co.	Philadelphia, Pennsylvania	United States	For private owner.
Unknown date	Childers	Torpedo boat	John I. Thornycroft & Company	Cheswick	United Kingdom	For Victorian Naval Forces.
Unknown date	Chios	Steamship	Messrs. C. S. Swan & Hunter	Wallsend	United Kingdom	For private owner.
Unknown date	City of Kingston	Steamship		Wilmington, Delaware	United States	For private owner.
Unknown date	City of Topeka	Steamship	John Roach & Sons	Chester, Pennsylvania	United States	For Atchison, Topeka and Santa Fe Railroad.
Unknown date	Clamye	Steamship	Messrs. Workman, Clarke & Co.	Belfast	United Kingdom	For private owner.
Unknown date	Clematis	Steamship	Messrs. R. Craggs & Sons	Middlesbrough	United Kingdom	For private owner.
Unknown date	Cloncurry	Steamship	William Doxford & Sons	Pallion	United Kingdom	For McIlwraith, McEacharn & Co.
Unknown date	Cockchafer	Tug	W. Allsup & Sons	Preston	United Kingdom	For Board of Trade.
Unknown date	Colac	Steamship	Messrs. Edward Withy & Co.	Middleton	United Kingdom	For private owner.
Unknown date	Commodore Perry	Revenue cutter	Union Drydock Company	Buffalo, New York	United States	For United States Revenue Cutter Service.
Unknown date	Conqueror	Steamboat	Messrs. Hepple & Co.	North Shields	United Kingdom	For private owner.
Unknown date	Constantinos	Steamship	Macintyre & Co., Limited	Hebburn	United Kingdom	For private owner.
Unknown date	Corona	Merchantman	Messrs. Thomas Royden & Sons	Liverpool	United Kingdom	For private owner.
Unknown date	Corra Linn	Steamship	Messrs. Workman, Clarke & Co.	Belfast	United Kingdom	For private owner.
Unknown date	Cortes	Steamship	James Laing	Deptford	United Kingdom	For José Roca & Co.
Unknown date	Countess of Derby	Steamboat	Messrs. Hepple & Co.	North Shields	United Kingdom	For private owner.
Unknown date	County of Lancaster	Steamship	Penarth Shipbuilding Company Limited	Penarth	United Kingdom	For Messrs. Thomas Duckworth & Co.
Unknown date	Cowden Law	Merchantman	Messrs. Campbell, Mackintosh & Bowstead	Scotswood	United Kingdom	For private owner.
Unknown date	Cricket	Steamboat	Messrs. Cochran & Co.	Birkenhead	United Kingdom	For private owner.
Unknown date	Danehill	Steamship	Messrs. Campbell, Mackintosh & Bowstead	Scotswood	United Kingdom	For Messrs. Hay, Adam & Co.
Unknown date	Danish Prince	Steamship	Messrs. John Readhead & Co.	South Shields	United Kingdom	For private owner.
Unknown date	Darwin	Steamship	Messrs. C. S. Swan & Hunter	Wallsend	United Kingdom	For private owner.
Unknown date	Dauntless	Steamship	Messrs. William Gray & Co.	West Hartlepool	United Kingdom	For private owner.
Unknown date	David Gillies	Steamship	Palmer's Shipbuilding and Iron Company	Jarrow	United Kingdom	For private owner.
Unknown date	Deerhound	Steamboat	J. T. Eltringham	South Shields	United Kingdom	For private owner.
Unknown date	Defiance	Paddle tug	W. Allsup & Sons	Preston	United Kingdom	For East and West India Dock Company
Unknown date	Defiance	Steamboat	Messrs. Hepple & Co.	North Shields	United Kingdom	For private owner.
Unknown date	Delabole	Steamship	Messrs. W. Dobson & Co.	Low Walker	United Kingdom	For private owner.
Unknown date	Delia	Steam launch	Messrs. Yarrow	Poplar	United Kingdom	For Messrs. Yarrow. Built of Delta metal.
Unknown date	Domingo	Steamship	James Laing	Deptford	United Kingdom	For D. G. Pinkney.
Unknown date	Don Juan	Merchantman	J. Knox & Co.	Sunderland	United Kingdom	For Finn, Butler & Co.
Unknown date	Duchess of Albany	Merchantman	Messrs. Thomas Royden & Sons	Liverpool	United Kingdom	For private owner.
Unknown date	Duke	Merchantman	Messrs. Raylton Dixon & Co.	Middlesbrough	United Kingdom	For private owner.
Unknown date	Durango	Steamship	Osbourne, Graham & Co	North Hylton	United Kingdom	For private owner.
Unknown date	Earl	Merchantman	Messrs. Raylton Dixon & Co.	Middlesbrough	United Kingdom	For private owner.
Unknown date	Elbe	Steamship	S. P. Austin & Son	Sunderland	United Kingdom	For W. Zoder & Co.
Unknown date	Elderslie	Steamship	Palmer's Shipbuilding and Iron Company	Jarrow	United Kingdom	For private owner.
Unknown date	Electric	Steamboat	Messrs. Hepple & Co.	North Shields	United Kingdom	For private owner.
Unknown date	Electric	Steamboat	J. R. Maxwell	South Shields	United Kingdom	For private owner.
Unknown date	Emilius	Steamship	Kish, Boolds & Co	Pallion	United Kingdom	For Kish, Boolds & Co.
Unknown date	Emperor	Merchantman	Messrs. Raylton Dixon & Co.	Middlesbrough	United Kingdom	For private owner.
Unknown date	Empress of India	Fishing trawler	John Bell	Grimsby	United Kingdom	For Charles Forester.
Unknown date	Endeavour	Steamship	Messrs. Raylton Dixon & Co.	Middlesbrough	United Kingdom	For private owner.
Unknown date	Energy	Steamship	Messrs. Raylton Dixon & Co.	Middlesbrough	United Kingdom	For private owner.
Unknown date	Ensign	Schooner		Garmouth	United Kingdom	For private owner.
Unknown date	Eureka	Steamship	William Cramp & Sons	Philadelphia, Pennsylvania	United States	For Southern Development.
Unknown date	Eurimbia	Steamship	Messrs. J. Key & Sons	Kirkcaldy	United Kingdom	For private owner.
Unknown date	Fairfield	Steamship	Richardson, Duck & Co.	South Stockton	United Kingdom	For private owner.
Unknown date	Ferse	Icebreaker	Danziger Schiffswerft & Kesselschmeide Feliks Devrient & Co	Danzig	Germany	For Königlich Preußische Weichsel-Strombauverwaltung.
Unknown date	Flying Bat	Steamboat	J. T. Eltringham	South Shields	United Kingdom	For private owner.
Unknown date	Folly	Schooner			United States	For private owner.
Unknown date	Frank Buckland	Steamboat	J. T. Eltringham	South Shields	United Kingdom	For private owner.
Unknown date	Fritzoe	Merchantman	Messrs. William Gray & Co.	West Hartlepool	United Kingdom	For private owner.
Unknown date	Frolic	Schooner			United States	For Maryland State Oyster Police Force.
Unknown date	Funchal	Steamship	James Laing	Deptford	United Kingdom	For Rachael Bensande.
Unknown date	Garth	Steamship	William Pickersgill & Sons	Southwick	United Kingdom	For Hurley, Matthews & Co., or Garth Steamship Co. Ltd.
Unknown date	George Spencer	Steamship	Thomas Quayle & Sons	Cleveland, Ohio	United States	For Thomas Wilson.
Unknown date	Gibel Tarik	Steamship	Sir W. G. Armstrong Mitchell & Co., Limited	Elswick or Walker	United Kingdom	For private owner.
Unknown date	Glenlui	Merchantman	Messrs. Thomas Royden & Sons	Liverpool	United Kingdom	For private owner.
Unknown date	Godrevy	Steamship	John Priestman & Co.	Southwick	United Kingdom	For J. T. Matthews.
Unknown date	Golconda	Steamship	William Pickersgill & Sons	Southwick	United Kingdom	For J. P. Ninnes & Son.
Unknown date	Gordon	Torpedo boat	J. Samuel White	Cowes	United Kingdom	For Victorian Naval Forces.
Unknown date	Gothenburg City	Steamship	Messrs. Edward Withy & Co.	Middleton	United Kingdom	For private owner.
Unknown date	Governor R. M. McLane	Steamboat	Neafie and Levy	Philadelphia, Pennsylvania	United States	For Maryland State Oyster Police Force.
Unknown ate	Grace	Merchantman	Messrs. William Bayley & Sons	Ipswich	United Kingdom	For W. Lethridge.
Unknown date	Grappler	Steamboat	J. T. Eltringham	South Shields	United Kingdom	For private owner.
Unknown date	Guthrie	Steamship	William Doxford & Sons	Pallion	United Kingdom	For Eastern and Australian Mail Steamship Co. Ltd.
Unknown date	Hellenes	Steamship	William Pickersgill & Sons	Southwick	United Kingdom	For R. P. Houston & Co.
Unknown date	Herbert	Tug	David Banks & Co.	Plymouth	United Kingdom	For John Westcott.
Unknown date	Herbert	Steamship	Macintyre & Co., Limited	Hebburn	United Kingdom	For private owner.
Unknown date	Hesperides	Steamship	Messrs. R. & J. Evans & Co.	Liverpool	United Kingdom	For private owner.
Unknown date	Horneburg	Steamship	Messrs. John Bloomer & Co.	Sunderland	United Kingdom	For private owner.
Unknown date	Industry	Steamship	Messrs. Raylton Dixon & Co.	Middlesbrough	United Kingdom	For private owner.
Unknown date	Ister	Steamboat	J. T. Eltringham	South Shields	United Kingdom	For private owner.
Unknown date	Italica	Steamship	Joseph L. Thompson & Sons	North Sands	United Kingdom	For J. M. de Ybarra & Cia..
Unknown date	Itlaroo	Steamship	Messrs. Wigham, Richardson & Co.	Low Walker	United Kingdom	For private owner.
Unknown date	Ituni	Steamship	Messrs. Wigham, Richardson & Co.	Low Walker	United Kingdom	For private owner.
Unknown date	Jacatra	Steamship	Messrs. Raylton Dixon & Co.	Middlesbrough	United Kingdom	For private owner.
Unknown date	J. A. Harley	Steamship	The Strand Slipway Company	Sunderland	United Kingdom	For J. A. Harley & Co.
Unknown date	James Westoll	Steamship	Short Bros.	Pallion	United Kingdom	For James Westoll Line.
Unknown date	J. & M. Garratt	Schooner	William Ashburner	Barrow-in-Furness	United Kingdom	For private owner.
Unknown date	Janet Nicholl	Steamship	Palmer's Shipbuilding and Iron Company	Jarrow	United Kingdom	For private owner.
Unknown date	John Batey	Steamboat	Messrs. Hepple & Co.	North Shields	United Kingdom	For private owner.
Unknown date	John Lockett	Merchantman	Messrs. R. & J. Evans & Co.	Liverpool	United Kingdom	For private owner.
Unknown date	Joseph H. Scammell	Full-rigged ship	Scammell Bros.	Eatonville	Canada	For private owner.
Unknown date	Joys	Steam barge		Milwaukee, Wisconsin	United States	For private owner.
Unknown date	Julia F.	Merchantman	Sir W. G. Armstrong Mitchell & Co., Limited	Elswick or Walker	United Kingdom	For private owner.
Unknown date	Karluk	Brigantine		Benicia, California	United States	For private owner.
Unknown date	Kildare	Merchantman	James Laing	Sunderland	United Kingdom	For R. M. Hudson & Son.
Unknown date	King	Merchantman	Messrs. Raylton Dixon & Co.	Middlesbrough	United Kingdom	For private owner.
Unknown date	Lady Wolseley	Merchantman	The North of England Shipbuilding Company	Pallion	United Kingdom	For T. Beynon & Co.
Unknown date	Lanfranc	Merchantman	Messrs. Thomas Royden & Sons	Liverpool	United Kingdom	For private owner.
Unknown date	Lansdowne	Train ferry	Detroit Dry Dock Company	Wyandotte, Michigan	United States	For private owner.
Unknown date	Laurestina	Steamship	Tyne Iron Shipbuilding Company	Willington Quay	United Kingdom	For private owner.
Unknown date	Leao	Steamboat	Messrs. Cochran & Co.	Birkenhead	United Kingdom	For private owner.
Unknown date	Lidader	Steamship	Messrs. Laird Bros.	Birkenhead	United Kingdom	For private owner.
Unknown date	Little Jennie	Bugeye			United States	For private owner.
Unknown date	Lizzie	Steamship	Messrs. R. Irvine & Co.	West Hartlepool	United Kingdom	For private owner.
Unknown date	Longnewton	Steamship	Messrs. Edward Withy & Co.	West Hartlepool	United Kingdom	For private owner.
Unknown date	Loro	Merchantman	Sir W. G. Armstrong Mitchell & Co., Limited	Elswick or Walker	United Kingdom	For private owner.
Unknown date	Madge	Merchantman	The Union Co-operative Shipbuilding Society	Blyth	United Kingdom	For private owner.
Unknown date	Majestic	Fishing vessel	R. Aldous & Co.	Brightlingsea	United Kingdom	For Robert Cross.
Unknown date	Manaos	Barge	Messrs. R. & J. Evans & Co.	Liverpool	United Kingdom	For private owner.
Unknown date	Margaret and Ann	Merchantman	The Union Co-operative Shipbuilding Society	Blyth	United Kingdom	For private owner.
Unknown date	Marquis Sciciuna	Steamship	The Sunderland Shipbuilding Company, Limited	Sunderland	United Kingdom	For private owner.
Unknown date	Medea D.	Steamship	Palmer's Shipbuilding and Iron Company	Jarrow	United Kingdom	For private owner.
Unknown date	Medina	Steam launch	J. Samuel White	East Cowes	United Kingdom	For Admiralty.
Unknown date	Merjulio	Steamship	Messrs. W. Gray & Co.	West Hartlepool	United Kingdom	For Marshall, Dodson & Co.
Unknown date	Midge	Steamboat	Messrs. Cochran & Sons	Birkenhead	United Kingdom	For private owner.
Unknown date	Moel Tryfan	Steamship	William Doxford & Sons	Pallion	United Kingdom	For W. E. Jones, or Gwynedd Shipping Co.
Unknown date	Montana	Steamship	Palmer's Shipbuilding and Engineering Company	Jarrow	United Kingdom	For private owner.
Unknown date	Moss Rose	Ketch	William Bayley & Sons	Ipswich	United Kingdom	For Richard Cox.
Unknown date	Mount Park	Steamship	The Sunderland Shipbuilding Co. Limited	Sunderland	United Kingdom	For J. & J. Denholm.
Unknown date	Mousinho da Silveira	Merchantman	J. Knox & Co	South Hylton	United Kingdom	For Tathem & Co.
Unknown date	Nant Conway	Steamship	Messrs. John Readhead & Co.	South Shields	United Kingdom	For private owner.
Unknown date	Newbattle	Steamship	Messrs. Pearce Brothers & Co.	Dundee	United Kingdom	For R. Mackie & Co.
Unknown date	Newcastle	Steamship	Messrs. J. Key & Sons	Kirkcaldy	United Kingdom	For private owner.
Unknown date	New Guinea	Steamship	William Doxford & Sons	Pallion	United Kingdom	For McIlwraith, McEachern & Co.
Unknown date	Niceto	Steamship	William Doxford & Sons	Pallion	United Kingdom	For Olano, Larrinaga & Co.
Unknown date	Nonpareil	Steamship	Messrs. T. & W. Smith	North Shields	United Kingdom	For private owner.
Unknown date	Nordjylland	Steamship	Joseph L. Thompson & Sons	North Sands	United Kingdom	For Det Forenede Dampskib-Selskab.
Unknown date	Norge	Steamship	Tyne Iron Shipbuilding Company	Willington Quay	United Kingdom	For private owner.
Unknown date	Obock	Steamship	Messrs. Schlesinger, Davis & Co.	Wallsend	United Kingdom	For private owner.
Unknown date	Omi Maru	Steamship	Sir W. G. Armstrong Mitchell & Co., Limited	Elswick or Walker	United Kingdom	For private owner.
Unknown date	Ouse	Steamship	Messrs. W. Dobson & Co.	Low Walker	United Kingdom	For private owner.
Unknown date	Oyapock	Steamship	Messrs. A. Leslie & Co.	Hebburn	United Kingdom	For private owner.
Unknown date	Pandora	Fishing trawler	John Bell	Grimsby	United Kingdom	For Charles Forester.
Unknown date	Patria	Whaler	Christian Brinch Jørgensen	Svelvik	Norway	For Johan Christian Jakobsen.
Unknown date	Perseverance	Steamship	Messrs. Raylton Dixon & Co.	Middlesbrough	United Kingdom	For private owner.
Unknown date	Point Pleasant	Steamship	Messrs. T. & W. Toward	Low Benwell	United Kingdom	For private owner.
Unknown date	Port Adelaide	Steamship	Messrs. A. Leslie & Co.	Hebburn	United Kingdom	For private owner.
Unknown date	Port Darwin	Steamship	Messrs. A. Leslie & Co.	Hebburn	United Kingdom	For private owner.
Unknown date	Port of Alicante	Steamship	Palmer's Shipbuilding and Iron Company	Jarrow	United Kingdom	For private owner.
Unknown date	Prince	Merchantman	Messrs. Raylton Dixon & Co.	Middlesbrough	United Kingdom	For private owner.
Unknown date	Prince of Wales	Steamboat	Messrs. Hepple & Co.	North Shields	United Kingdom	For private owner.
Unknown date	Priscilla	Schooner	David Clark	Kennebunkport, Maine	United States	For private owner.
Unknown date	Professor Huxley	Fishing trawler	John Bell	Grimsby	United Kingdom	For George L. Alward & J. A. Alward.
Unknown date	Prydian	Steamship	Palmer's Shipbuilding and Engineering Company	Willington Quay	United Kingdom	For W. Thomas.
Unknown date	Pudeto	Steamship	J. Knox & Co.	South Hylton	United Kingdom	For Compagnia Sud Americana de Vapores.
Unknown date	Ravensbury	Steamship		Greenwich	United Kingdom	For Great Eastern Railway.
Unknown date	Rebecca	Steamboat	J. T. Eltringham	South Shields	United Kingdom	For private owner.
Unknown date	Ripon	Steamship	Messrs. A. Leslie & Co.	Hebburn	United Kingdom	For private owner.
Unknown date	River Indus	Merchantman	Messrs. Workman, Clarke & Co.	Belfast	United Kingdom	For private owner.
Unknown date	Roan	Steamship	Messrs. Laird Bros.	Birkenhead	United Kingdom	For private owner.
Unknown date	Rosa	Steamboat	J. T. Eltringham	South Shields	United Kingdom	For private owner.
Unknown date	Rosehill	Steamship	Joseph L. Thompson & Sons	North Sands	United Kingdom	For Robinson & Rowland.
Unknown date	Roseland	Steamship	William Doxford & Sons	Pallion	United Kingdom	For P. Rowe & Sons.
Unknown date	Sagami Maru	Steamship	Sir W. G. Armstrong Mitchell & Co., Limited	Elswick or Walker	United Kingdom	For private owner.
Unknown date	Salacia	Fishing trawler	John Bell	Grimsby	United Kingdom	For Walter C. Brown.
Unknown date	San Miguel	Steamboat	Messrs. J. Knox & Co	South Hylton	United Kingdom	For private owner.
Unknown date	Saturnina	Steamship	William Doxford & Sons	Pallion	United Kingdom	For Olano, Larrinaga & Co.
Unknown date	Saxon Prince	Steamboat	J. R. Maxwell	South Shields	United Kingdom	For private owner.
Unknown date	Seneca	Steam barge	Delaware River Iron Ship Building and Engine Works	Chester, Pennsylvania	United States	For private owner.
Unknown date	Silent Wave	Fishing trawler	John Bell	Grimsby	United Kingdom	For George Finch.
Unknown date	Sir W. Armstrong	Steamship	Sir W. G. Armstrong Mitchell & Co., Limited	Elswick or Walker	United Kingdom	For private owner.
Unknown date	Sivuch	Sivuch-class gunboat	Bergsunds Yard	Stockholm	Sweden	For Imperial Russian Navy.
Unknown date	Snowdon	Steamboat	Messrs. Lawson & Eltringham	South Shields	United Kingdom	For private owner.
Unknown date	Stag	Steamship	Tyne Iron Shipbuilding Company	Willington Quay	United Kingdom	For private owner.
Unknown date	Stirling Castle	Paddle steamer	Messrs. Morton & Co.	Leith	United Kingdom	For M. P. Galloway.
Unknown date	Stockholm City	Steamship	Palmer's Shipbuilding and Iron Company	Jarrow	United Kingdom	For private owner.
Unknown date	Sudbourn	Merchantman	Richardson, Duck & Co.	South Stockton	United Kingdom	For private owner.
Unknown date	Susa	Patrol boat	AG Weser	Bremen	Germany	For Royal Persian Navy.
Unknown date	Tedmandale	Steamship	Messrs. John Readhead & Co.	South Shields	United Kingdom	For private owner.
Unknown date	Terra Nova	Barque	Alexander Stephen & Sons Ltd.	Dundee	United Kingdom	For private owner.
Unknown date	Thomas Friant	Ferry	Duncan Robertson	Grand Haven, Michigan	United Kingdom	For Reuben & Ralph Vanderhoef.
Unknown date	Treloske	Steamship	Messrs. John Readhead & Co.	South Shields	United Kingdom	For private owner.
Unknown date	Trevelloe	Steamship	Messrs. John Readhead & Co.	South Shields	United Kingdom	For private owner.
Unknown date	Tudor Prince	Steamship	Joseph L. Thompson & Sons	North Sands	United Kingdom	For The Prince Steamship Co.
Unknown date	Urso	Steamboat	Messrs. Cochran & Co.	Birkenhead	United Kingdom	For private owner.
Unknown date	Uva	Steamship	Macintyre & Co., Limited	Hebburn	United Kingdom	For private owner.
Unknown date	Vane Tempest	Steamship	Messrs. E. Withy & Co.	Middleton	United Kingdom	For private owner.
Unknown date	Victoria	Flat-iron gunboat	Sir WG Armstrong Mitchell & Company	Elswick	United Kingdom	For Victorian Naval Forces.
Unknown date	Waialeale	Steamboat	Hall Brothers	Port Blakely, Washington	United States	For private owner.
Unknown date	Walter Thomas	Steamship	Palmer's Shipbuilding and Iron Company	Jarrow	United Kingdom	For private owner.
Unknown date	Washisti	Steamship	Messrs. Dobson & Charles	Grangemouth	United Kingdom	For Dunsmuir & Jackson.
Unknown date	Wanderer	Steamboat	J. T. Eltringham	South Shields	United Kingdom	For private owner.
Unknown date	Watchman	Merchantman	Messrs. Workman, Clarke & Co.	Belfast	United Kingdom	For private owner.
Unknown date	W. B. Ferguson	Merchantman	Short Brothers	Sunderland	United Kingdom	For James Westoll.
Unknown date	Weardale	Steamship	The Strand Slipway Company	Sunderland	United Kingdom	For J. Laing.
Unknown date	Westward Ho	Barque	James Laing	Deptford	United Kingdom	For R. H. Gaymer.
Unknown date	Wick Bay	Steamship	Messrs. A. Leslie & Co.	Hebburn	United Kingdom	For private owner.
Unknown date	William Adamson	Steamship	Short Bros.	Pallion	United Kingdom	For James Westoll Line.
Unknown date	Workman	Merchantman	Messrs. Workman, Clarke & Co.	Belfast	United Kingdom	For private owner.
Unknown date	Wynnstay	Steamship	Palmer's Shipbuilding and Iron Company	Jarrow	United Kingdom	For private owner.
Unknown date	Zafiro	Collier	Hall, Russell & Company	Aberdeen	United Kingdom	For The China and Manilla Steam Navigation Co. Ltd.
Unknown date	Zodiac	Steamship	Messrs. Wigham, Richardson & Co.	Low Walker	United Kingdom	For private owner.
Unknown date	No. 28	Merchantman	Messrs. Cochran & Sons	Birkenhead	United Kingdom	For private owner.
Unknown date	No. 29	Merchantman	Messrs. Cochran & Sons	Birkenhead	United Kingdom	For private owner.
Unknown date	No. 31	Merchantman	Messrs. Cochran & Sons	Birkenhead	United Kingdom	For private owner.
Unknown date	No. 75	Steamship	The Strand Slipway Company	Sunderland	United Kingdom	For private owner.
Unknown date	No. 124	Steamboat	J. T. Eltringham	South Shields	United Kingdom	For private owner.
Unknown date	No. 138	Steamship	Messrs. Robert Thompson & Sons	Southwick	United Kingdom	For private owner.
Unknown date	No. 393	Steamboat	Messrs. Hepple & Co.	North Shields	United Kingdom	For private owner.
Unknown date	Unnamed	Hopper barge	Blyth Shipbuilding Co. Ltd	Blyth	United Kingdom	For private owner.
Unknown date	Unnamed	Hopper barge	Blyth Shipbuilding Co. Ltd	Blyth	United Kingdom	For private owner.
Unknown date	Unnamed	Crane barge	Sir W. G. Armstrong Mitchell & Co., Limited	Elswick or Walker	United Kingdom	For private owner.
Unknown date	Unnamed	Barge	Sir W. G. Armstrong Mitchell & Co., Limited	Elswick or Walker	United Kingdom	For private owner.
Unknown date	Unnamed	Hopper barge	Messrs. Richardson, Duck & Co.	South Stockton	United Kingdom	For private owner.
