= Buster (given name) =

Buster is the given name of the following people:

- Buster (1958–1991), American adult film actor and model
- Buster Drayton (1952–2022), American boxer
- Buster Glosson, retired U.S. Air Force lieutenant general
- Buster Juul (born 1993), Danish handball player
- Buster Mathis (1943–1995), American heavyweight boxer
- Buster Mathis Jr. (born 1970), American heavyweight boxer, son of Buster Mathis
- Buster Mills (1908–1991), American Major League Baseball outfielder, coach, scout and interim manager

== Fictional characters ==
- Buster, Andy's dog in the Toy Story franchise
- Buster, antagonist of Lady and the Tramp II: Scamp's Adventure
- Buster, a puppy owned by Darby in My Friends Tigger & Pooh
- Buster, the monkey mascot of Price Busters TV, a shopping channel based in the UK
- Buster Baxter, frequently identified as "Buster the Bunny", star of Postcards from Buster and originally from the show Arthur
- Buster the Bear, a character from the cartoon Fables of the Green Forest
- Buster Blues, in Blues Brothers 2000
- Buster Bluth, from Arrested Development
- Buster Briggs, a character from EastEnders
- Buster Brown, a comic strip character created in 1902, and the children's shoes associated with that character
- Buster Bunny, one of the main characters in Tiny Toon Adventures and Looniversity
- Buster Capp, the eponymous star of the Buster comic, son of Andy and Flo Capp
- Buster Doyle, a character from River City
- Buster Gonad, a comic strip character from the magazine Viz
- GAT-X103 Buster Gundam, from the Mobile Suit Gundam SEED universe
- Buster Kilrain, from the novel The Killer Angels and the movie adaptation Gettysburg (1993)
- Buster the Koala, one of the eponymous protagonists of The Koala Brothers
- Buster Moon, one of the main characters from the Sing franchise
- Buster the Nanobot, a boss in Ty the Tasmanian Tiger 2: Bush Rescue
- Buster Scruggs, character from the Netflix film The Ballad of Buster Scruggs
- Buster, a tank character from the mobile game Brawl Stars
