= Buster (surname) =

Buster is a surname. Notable people with the surname include:

- Budd Buster (1891–1965), American actor known for B western films
- John Buster (born 1941), American physician, director of the team that performed the first embryo transfer resulting in a live birth in 1984

== See also ==
- Buster (nickname)
- Buster (disambiguation)
