= Price Busters TV =

- Price Busters TV logo

Ownership
- Owner: MK Promotions

History
- Launched: 3 July 2006; 18 years ago
- Closed: 22 February 2007

Links
- Website: www.pricebusters.tv

Price Busters TV was an unsuccessful shopping channel in United Kingdom launched by entrepreneur Mark Klein in July 2006. It was based in Bulwell, Nottingham. At launch the channel broadcast live daily from 4 pm through until midnight. When Price Busters TV was not broadcasting live it repeated the previous evening's live output in whole from midnight through until 8 am, and again from 8 am through until 4 pm.

Towards the end of its life the channel broadcast mainly repeats and was only live three days a week. A winding up order was made against the company on 2 April 2007, after it had ceased broadcasting. At the time there were about 1,500 orders packaged paid for, but undelivered due to a dispute with the courier.

Originally, Price Busters TV was only available via the Sky Digital platform on channel 681. However, on 20 October 2006, it followed the example of other shopping channels in the United Kingdom and commenced live online video streaming through its website.

Price Busters TV ceased broadcasting on 22 February 2007.

== Presenters ==
At launch Price Busters TV had nine presenters, and shortly thereafter were joined by Hannah Patterson from Speed Auction TV.

The presenters at launch were Julia Binns, Tina Harris, Martin Killick, Rebecca Mahon, Simon Liddicott, Janice Phillips, Ruth Terry, Mark Tunstall and Lou Webb.

Following the launch and disappointing sales, Price Busters TV began restructuring. This resulted in redundancies including Julia Binns and Simon Liddicott. A few months later Rebecca Mahon, and Hannah Patterson also parted company with Price Busters TV. In January 2007 it was announced that Price Busters released Ruth Terry, while Lou Webb handed her notice in.

This left Price Busters TV with a team of four presenters. Two pairs of presenters would appear on the channel daily. Each presenter spent no more than five minutes on-screen talking about a particular product.

== Second Channel ==
When Price Busters TV launched, it operated on channel 681, but as of January 2007 it moved to channel 638 on the Sky EPG, making way for Price Busters TV 2 on channel 681. Price Busters TV 2 consisted solely of pre-recorded output.
