= Footdee =

Area of Aberdeen, Scotland

Coordinates: 57.1438°N 2.0711°W

Footdee: Fittie
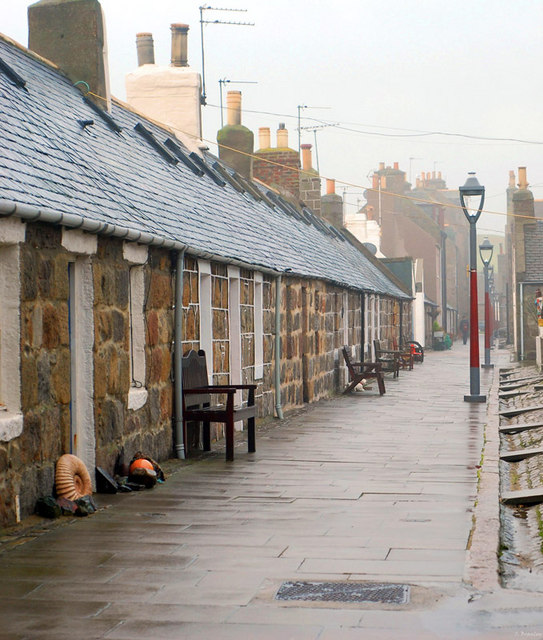

- Location within the Aberdeen City council area Location within Scotland
- OS grid reference: NJ957058
- Council area: Aberdeen City
- Lieutenancy area: Aberdeen
- Country: Scotland
- Sovereign state: United Kingdom
- Post town: ABERDEEN
- Postcode district: AB11
- Dialling code: 01224
- Police: Scotland
- Fire: Scottish
- Ambulance: Scottish
- UK Parliament: Aberdeen North
- Scottish Parliament: Aberdeen Central
- Website: aberdeencity.gov.uk

Footdee (/fʊtˈdiː/), locally known as Fittie, is a picturesque area of Aberdeen, Scotland. A former fishing village, it lies at the entrance to Aberdeen Harbour. The name appears to mean "foot of the Dee", but it has also been linked to Fittick, a local saint.

Footdee is mentioned in sources from the 14th century onwards. The medieval village centred on the church of St Clement, some distance west of the modern Footdee. The modern village, referred to on early maps as "Fish Town", was laid out by John Smith in 1808–9. Smith's design comprised 28 cottages arranged in two squares, North Square and South Square. The development was later enlarged by the addition of Middle Row (c. 1837) and Pilot Square (c. 1855).

On Tuesday 25 September 2012, parts of Footdee became covered in foam from the sea after experiencing strong wind and rain conditions. The effect was like a blanket of snow and this made the UK national news.

== Transportation ==
Footdee was formerly served by the number 15 bus route. The route was withdrawn in July 2022. It is now served by 4 services a day on route 13.

== Gallery ==
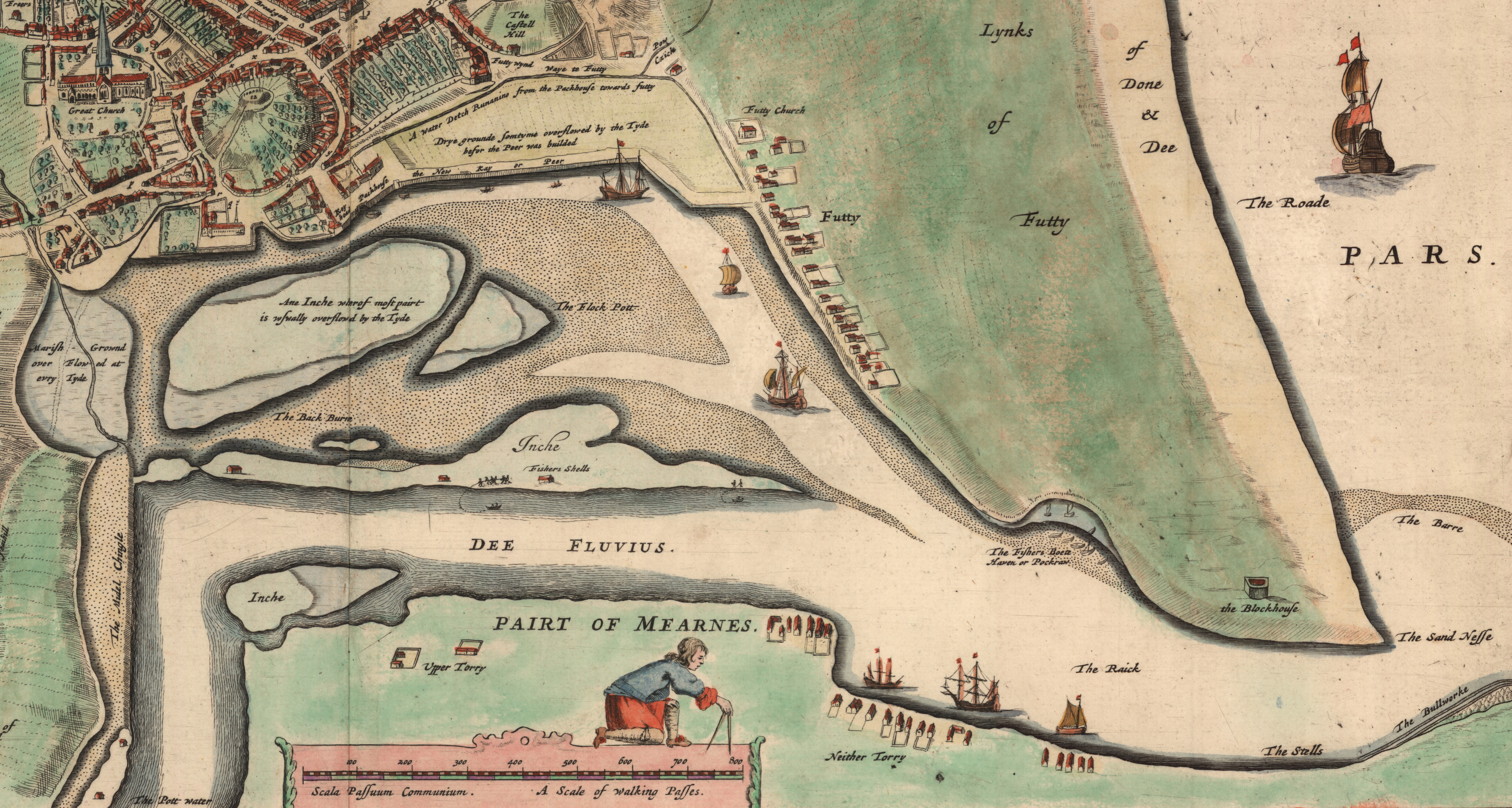
Detail from Parson Gordon's map of Aberdeen (1661), showing "Futty"

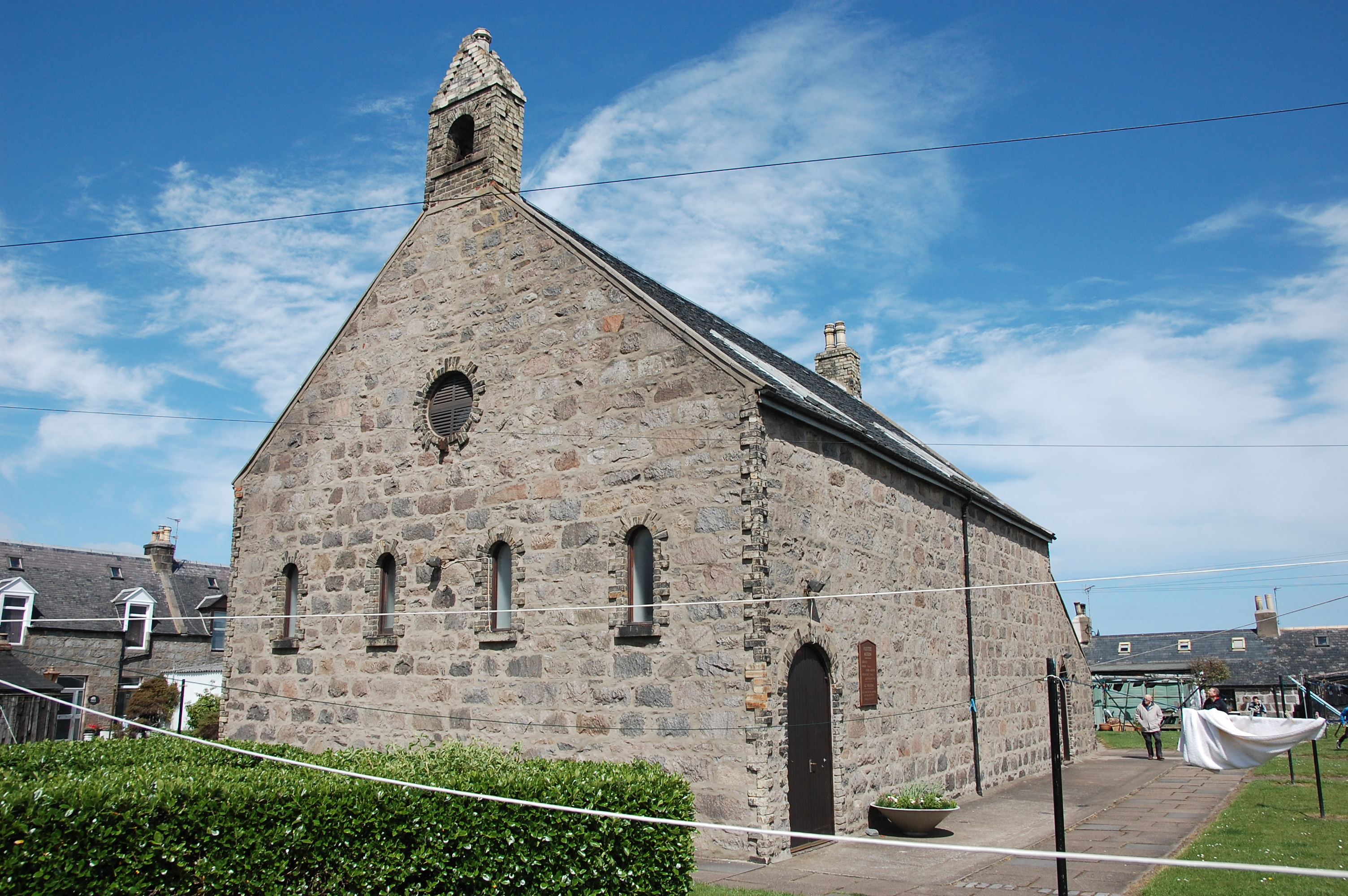
North Square Mission Hall

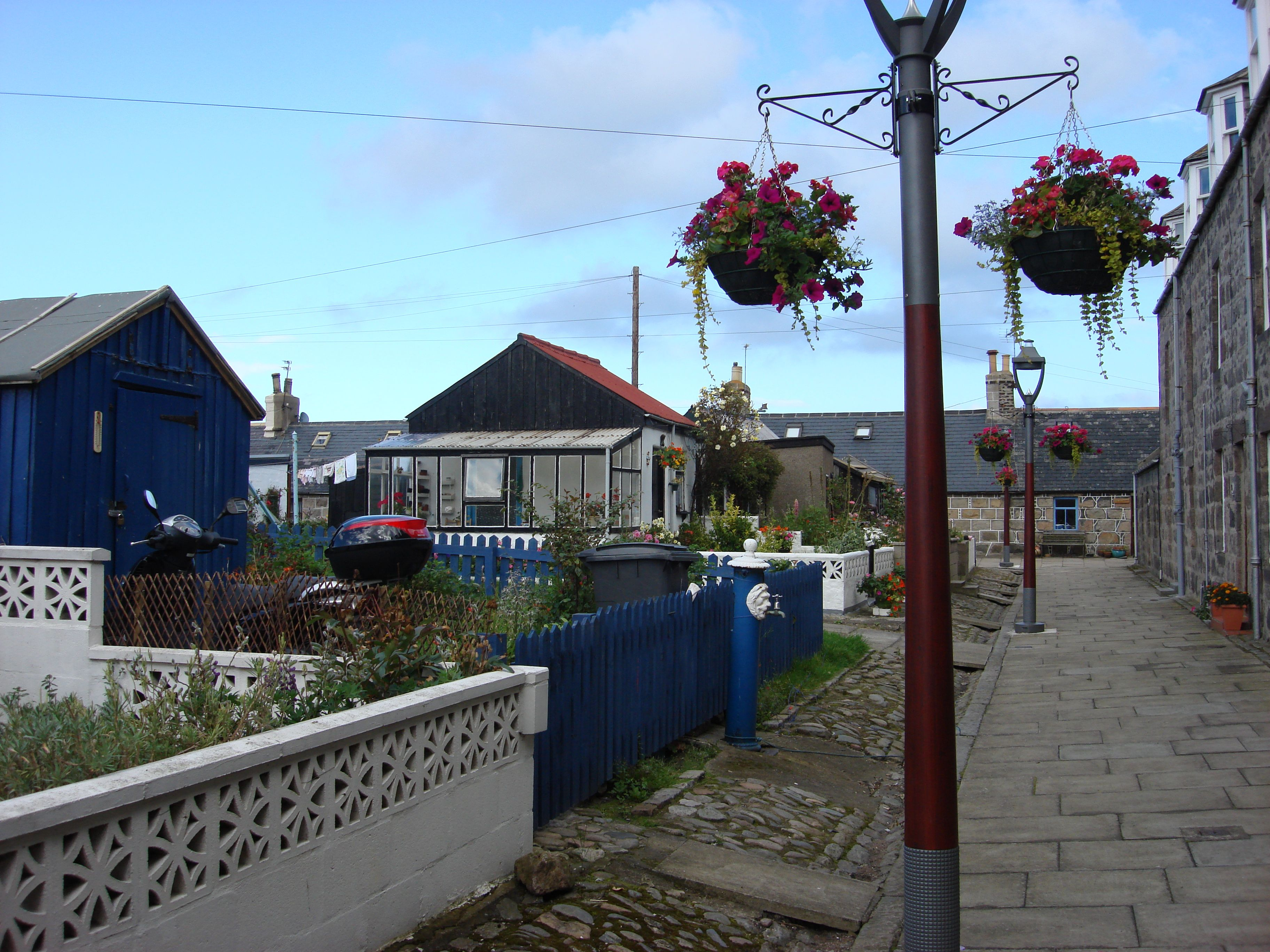
Houses in Footdee

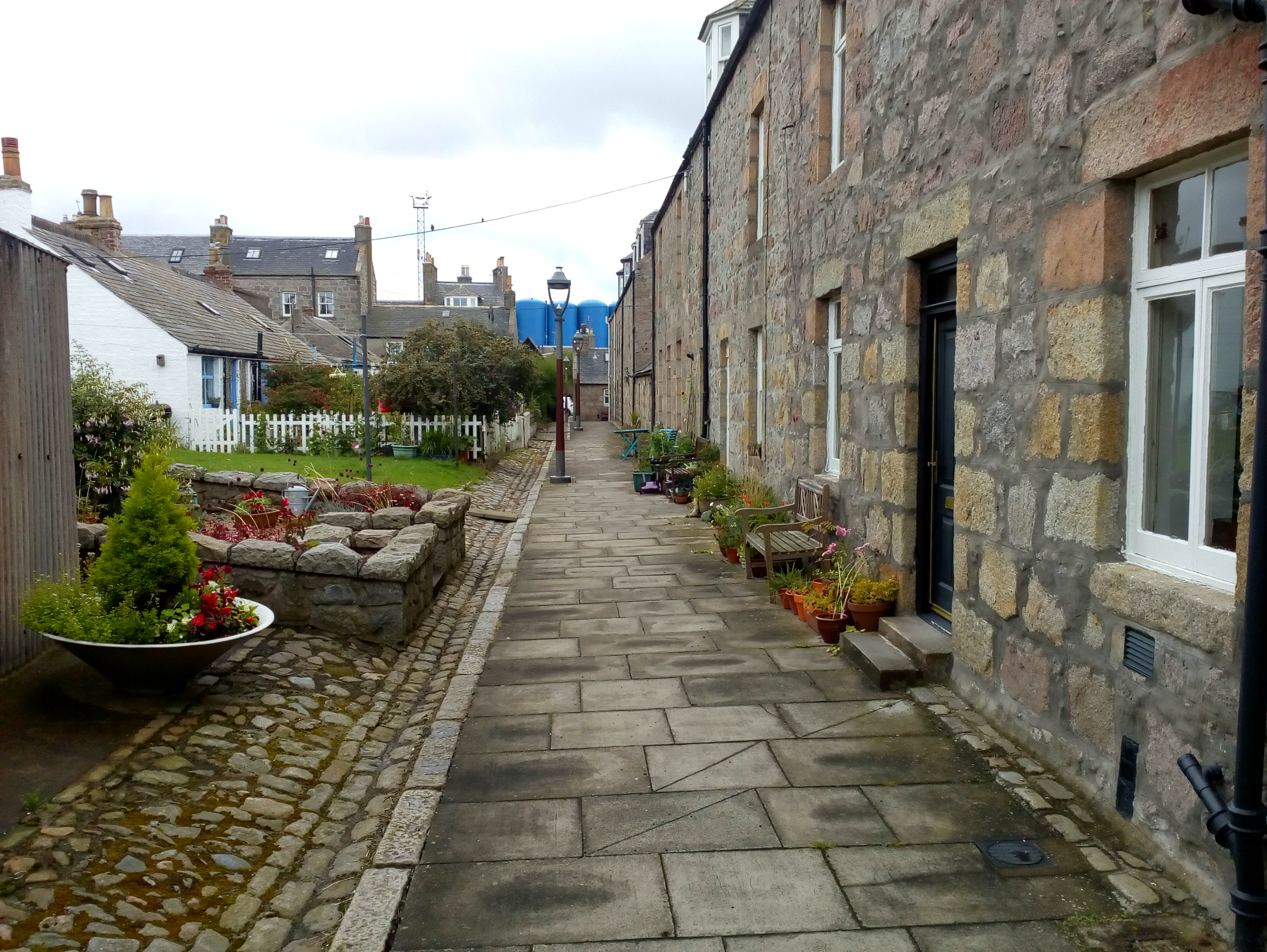
Houses in Footdee

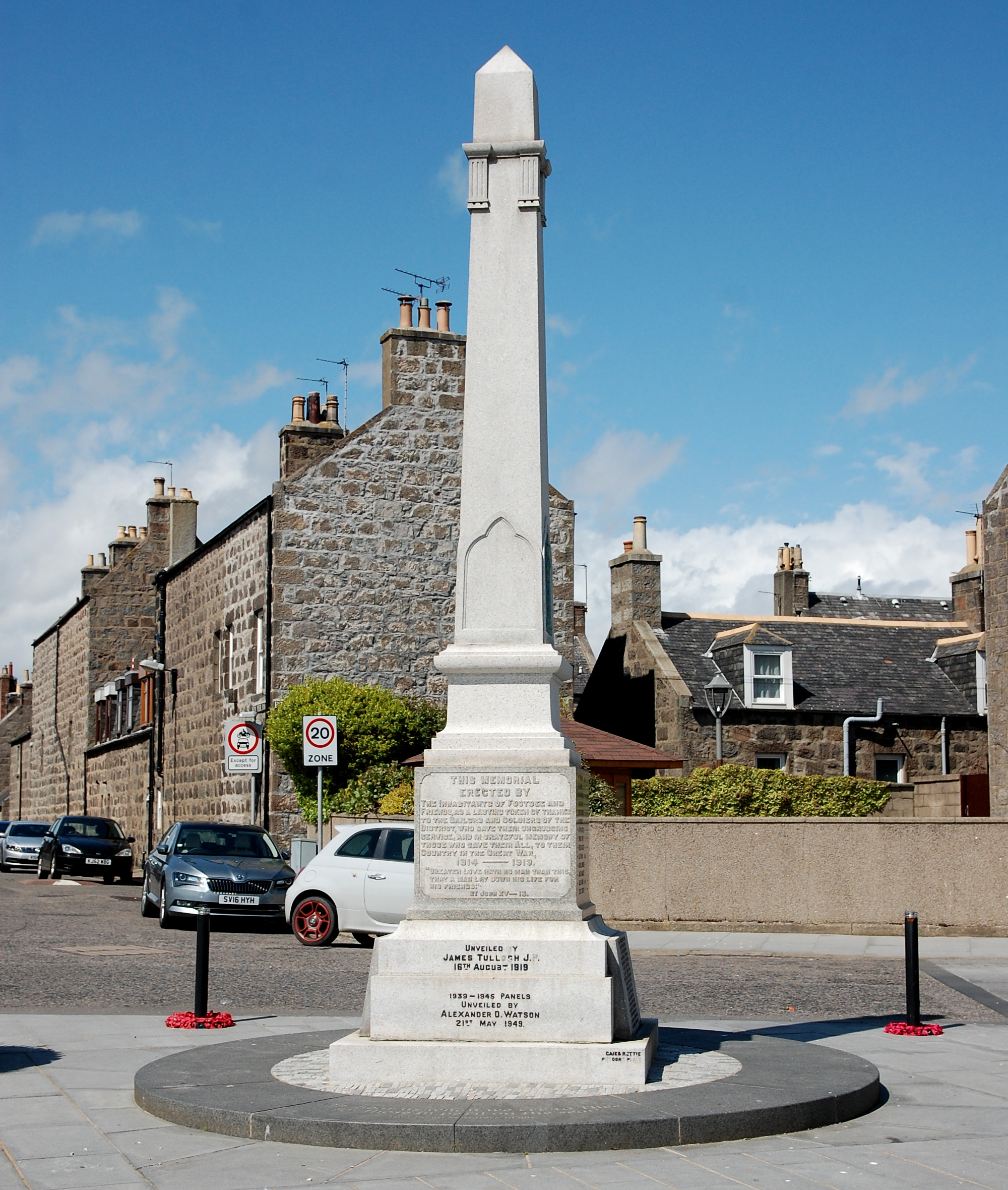
Footdee War Memorial
