= SS Aeolus (1884) =

SS Aeolus was a Swedish coastal freighter built in 1884 and wrecked in 1927.

== History ==
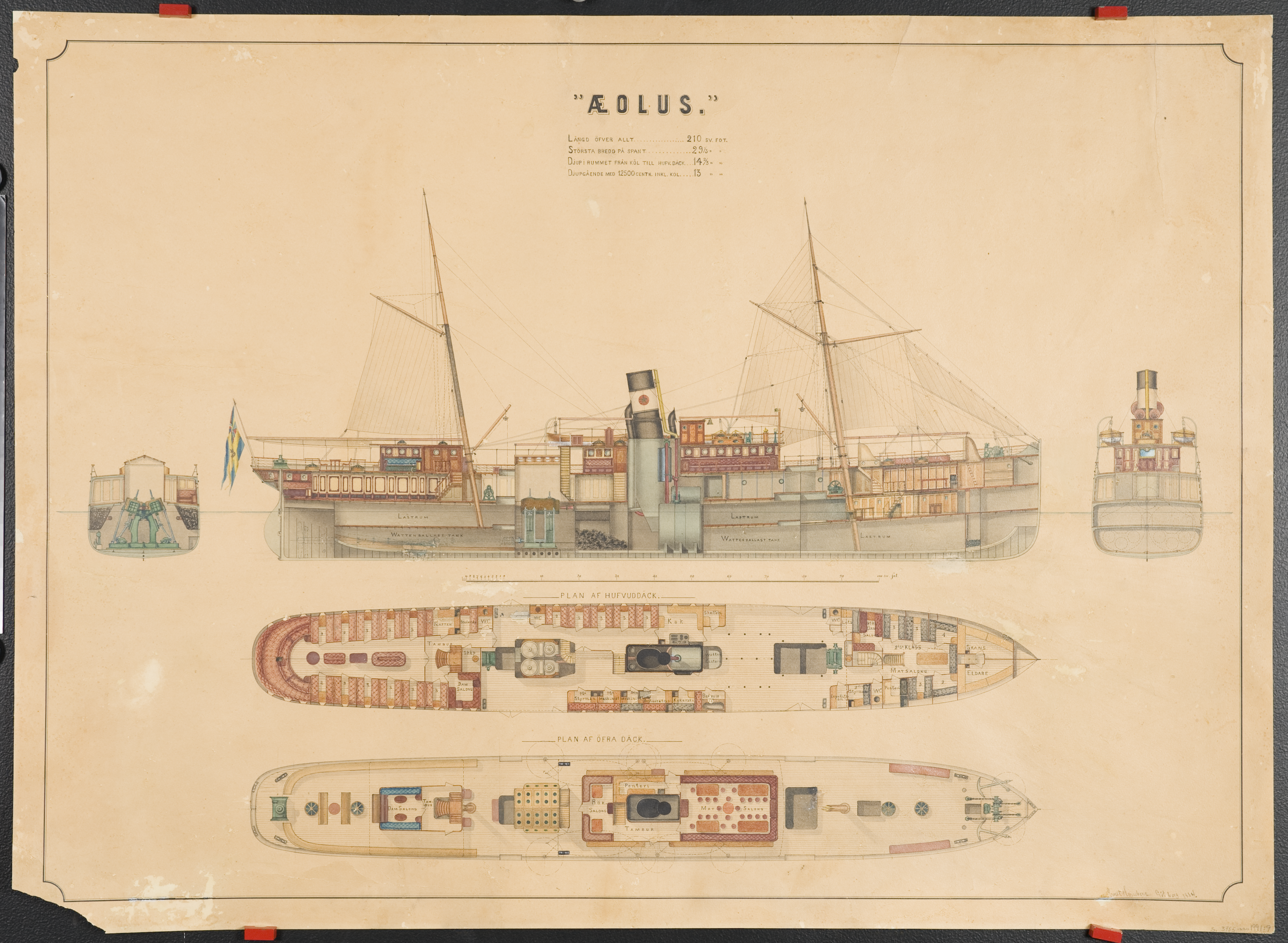
Cutaway and deck plan drawing of Aeolus from the Swedish Maritime Museum.

Ordered by Rederi AB Svea, Aeolus was built by Lindholmens Mechanical Workshop in Gothenburg. She was powered by a coal-burning reciprocating steam engine.

Aeolus operated mostly in the Baltic Sea, mainly between Stockholm, Copenhagen, Lübeck, and Riga.

Aeolus was severely damaged by fire at Stockholm on 9 April 1926.

She was broken up in 1956.
