= Buster (nickname) =

Buster is a nickname of:

== Actors ==
- William Collier Jr. (1902–1987), American actor
- Buster Crabbe (1908–1983), American actor and athlete
- Buster Larsen, Danish comic actor Axel Landing Larsen (1920–1993)
- Buster Keaton (1895–1966), American actor, filmmaker, producer and writer
- Buster Merryfield (1920–1999), English actor most famous for his portrayal of 'Uncle' Albert Trotter in the sitcom Only Fools and Horses

== Musicians and singers ==
- Buster Bailey (1902–1967), American jazz musician
- Buster Bennett (1914–1980), American blues saxophonist and vocalist
- Buster Benton (1932–1996), American blues guitarist and singer
- Buster Bloodvessel (born 1958), English singer of the ska revival band Bad Manners
- Buster Brown (musician) (1911–1976), American R&B singer and musician
- Buster Cooper (1929–2016), American jazz trombonist
- Edward "Little Buster" Forehand, soul and blues musician
- Buster Harding (1917–1965), Canadian jazz pianist, composer and arranger
- Buster Meikle, singer and guitarist, formerly with Unit 4 + 2 and Buster & Bill
- Buster Poindexter, a pseudonym of singer David Johansen (born 1950)
- Buster Smith (1904–1991), American jazz musician
- Buster Williams (born 1942), jazz bass player
- Buster Wilson (1897–1949), American jazz pianist
- Prince Buster, Jamaican musician Cecil Bustamente Campbell (1938–2016)

== In sports ==
- Buster Adams (1915–1990), American Major League Baseball outfielder
- Buster Bishop (1920–2004), American college golf coach
- Alonzo Boone (1908–1982), American baseball pitcher and manager in the Negro leagues
- Buster Brown (baseball) (1881–1914), American Major League Baseball pitcher
- Buster Crabbe, Olympic swimmer and actor Clarence Linden Crabbe II (1908–1983)
- Jack Craigie (1913–1994), Australian rugby league footballer
- Buster Cupit (1927–2023), American retired golfer
- Buster Douglas (born 1960), American heavyweight boxer
- Buster Farrer (1936–2025), South African cricketer
- Ángel Figueroa (born 1981), Puerto Rican basketball player
- Lou Gehrig (1903–1941), American Hall of Fame Major League Baseball player
- Buster Harvey (1950–2007), Canadian National Hockey League winger
- Buster Millerick (1905–1986), American Hall of Fame racehorse trainer
- Buster Mottram (born 1955), English tennis player
- Buster Narum (1940–2004), American Major League Baseball pitcher
- Buster Nupen (1902–1977), South African cricketer
- Buster Olney (born 1964), American sports journalist
- Buster Posey (born 1987), American Major League Baseball catcher and first baseman
- Buster Ramsey (1920–2007), American college football player and National Football League player and head coach
- Buster Rhymes (born 1962), American retired National Football League wide receiver
- Buster Skrine (born 1989), American National Football League player
- Carl "Buster" Smith (1921–1992), American checkers player
- Vern Stephens (1920–1968), American Major League Baseball shortstop
- Phil Tomney (1862–1892), American baseball shortstop
- Luke Watson (sprinter) (born 1957), British sprinter

== Other ==
- Geoffrey Bailey (1899–1929 or later), English First World War flying ace
- Francis William Beaumont (1903–1941), heir to the Seigneur of Sark, Royal Air Force officer and film producer
- Buster Edwards (1931–1994), member of the gang that perpetrated the Great Train Robbery
- Buster Lloyd-Jones (1914–1980), British veterinarian
- Buster Martin, who claimed to be the oldest employee in the UK
- Lionel Crabb (1909–c. 1956), British Royal Navy and MI6 diver
