= Buster (dog) =

Dog owned by Roy Hattersley

Buster as he appears on the cover of one version of Buster's Diaries.

Buster was a dog belonging to Roy Hattersley, a British politician and former Deputy Leader of the Labour Party.

Buster was a mongrel, as his father was a German Shepherd, and his mother a Staffordshire Bull Terrier. He was a former rescue dog adopted by Hattersley from Brent Animal Shelter, in 1995.

On 6 April 1996, Buster attacked and killed a goose in St James's Park, London. Hattersley was stopped and questioned by the police while returning home after walking Buster in the park. Buster was suspected of killing the goose, while not under Hattersley's control, and a quick check revealed blood around his muzzle. As the goose was located in a Royal Park, it was the property of The Queen. The Royal connection, coupled with Hattersley's prominent public position, led to national media coverage of the incident. He was charged with contravening Regulation 3(5)(b) of the Royal and Other Parks and Gardens Regulations 1977. On 20 November 1996, Hattersley pleaded guilty by letter, and was fined £25 for letting Buster off the lead (although he claimed that Buster had pulled the lead out of his hand), and £50 for letting him kill the goose.

The incident has been referred to in the media many times, both by Hattersley himself and by others, including his political opponents. Hattersley wrote a piece in The Guardian, sympathising with The Princess Royal after one of her dogs had allegedly attacked a woman in Windsor, and Jeremy Paxman mentioned the incident in a piece in The Times which he wrote in response to comments Hattersley had made about the BBC.

In 1998, Hattersley published Buster's Diaries (as told to Roy Hattersley) which were purportedly the dog's own thoughts on his life and relationship with his owner, and in which Buster was characterised as having acted in self-defense.

Buster has also appeared on television numerous times, which includes a 2001 profiling on Star Pets.

Buster died in October 2009. Following his death, Private Eye's E. J. Thribb wrote a memorial poem for Buster.

== Sources ==
- Roy Hattersley (1998). Buster's Diaries. Little, Brown and Co. ISBN 0-7515-3331-9.
- Roy Hattersley (2001-05-21). "Humphrys and his kind". The Guardian.
- Roy Hattersley (2002-10-01). "Anne, you have my sympathy". The Guardian.
