= Buster (actor) =

American actor and model (1956–1991)

- Born: Jeffrey Wayne Cole; August 23, 1958; South Hill, Virginia, U.S.
- Died: May 10, 1991 (aged 32); West Hollywood, California, U.S.
- Other name: Jeffrey Cole
- Education: Albuquerque High School
- Occupations: Actor; model
- Years active: 1978–1991
- Agent: Falcon Studios

Jeffrey Wayne Cole (August 23, 1958 – May 10, 1991), known professionally by the stage name Buster, was an American adult film actor, model, and political candidate. A veteran of the United States Marine Corps, he became a prominent figure in the "Golden Age" of gay adult cinema in the 1980s before running for the West Hollywood City Council in 1986.

== Early life and education ==
Jeffrey Wayne Cole was born in South Hill, Virginia, into a military family. Due to his father's career as a professional military officer, Cole moved frequently during his youth. He attended school at Randolph Air Force Base in Texas and later graduated from Central High School in Albuquerque, New Mexico.

Following high school, Cole enlisted in the United States Marine Corps, where he served for three years. During his service, he was frequently stationed in and near Oceanside, California, a location that would later play a significant role in his entry into the adult industry.

== Career ==
=== Adult film and modeling ===
In the late 1970s, Cole was discovered by industry figures in Oceanside. He began a career in gay adult cinema and physique modeling under the name "Buster". The name was reportedly a result of a clerical mix-up by director Mark Reynolds during the production of Buster and Bill; the name was intended for another performer but ultimately stuck with Cole. He was a prolific model for gay adult magazines and erotic publishers, appearing in numerous physique pictorials of the era.

Active from 1978 to 1991, Cole was marketed as a "free-spirited surfer" with signature curly blonde hair and a lean-muscled physique. He worked for major studios including Falcon Studios, Catalina Video, and California Choice. His filmography includes over 30 titles, many of which were posthumous compilations and "anniversary" editions of his early 1980s work.

=== 1986 City Council Campaign ===
In 1986, Cole ran for a seat on the West Hollywood City Council. Living at the time with his mentor and friend Richie Silverman, Cole ran an open campaign. When questioned about his past, he famously admitted to his work in adult films, stating, "Maybe some of them were X-rated. Anyway, I'm not making them anymore". Despite the publicity, his bid was unsuccessful.

== Personal life ==
In the early 1980s, Cole lived in Los Angeles and was involved with Richard Moore. During this period, he worked as a property manager for Harry Weiss and was a frequent guest at Weiss's compound in Palm Springs.

Later in the decade, Cole struggled with substance abuse. He was aided in his recovery by Richie Silverman, who provided him with housing and stability during his political run and his subsequent health decline.

== Death and controversy ==
Cole died of AIDS-related complications on May 10, 1991, at a hospice in West Hollywood. He was 32 years old.

=== Burial dispute ===
Following his death, the U.S. Marine Corps initially agreed to provide him with a military burial. However, according to family accounts, the military rescinded the offer after learning of his sexual orientation and his career in the adult industry. As a result, Cole was buried in an unmarked grave in Oceanside, California. His family, lacking the financial means at the time, was unable to purchase a headstone.

== Filmography ==
=== Film ===
Year	Title	Role	Notes
1980	The Big Surprise	Buster	Debut
1982	Buster Goes to Laguna	Buster	
1983	Sailor in the Wild 1	Surfer	
1984	The Bigger the Better 1	Blonde	
1984	Buster: The Best Years	Buster	
1985	Night Flight	Chris	
1986	Hot Numbers 1, 2, & 4	John	
1988	Blue Vanities Tape 32	Buster	
1989	Sex in the Great Outdoors 1	Buster	
1990	For You 4: Signature Solo Series	Buster	
1993	Bet Your Buns on It	Buster	Posthumous release
2002	Young Men of the 80's 2	Buster	Posthumous release
2008	Buster Goes to Laguna: 25th Anniv.	Buster	Posthumous release
2011	Falcon 40th Anniversary	Buster	Posthumous release
2021	Falcon Icons: The 1980s	Buster	Posthumous release

== Legacy ==
Cole is remembered as a quintessential "surfer" icon of 1980s gay media. His image continues to be used by studios like Falcon and Catalina in "Icon" and "Classic" collections. He was survived by his parents and his brother, Steven Cole. He is memorialized on The AIDS Memorial and in various archives documenting the history of West Hollywood's early political and social landscape.
