= Buster Lloyd-Jones =

British veterinarian

An illustration of Buster Lloyd-Jones by Stella Mackies Cox.

William Llewelyn "Buster" Lloyd-Jones (1914–1980) was a British veterinary practitioner.

In his early years, he developed a passion for animals. Buster contracted polio as a young child, which affected him later in his life.

As Buster grew up he was determined to become a vet. Though it meant a complete break with his father, he enrolled for training with a well-known animal society as a trainee in animal husbandry. Shortly afterwards he was appointed as lethalist to the animal dispensary at Wimbledon.

Buster cared for sick, injured and abandoned animals during the Second World War. Buster was a very kind man with a passion for animals, and during the war, kept a menagerie of abandoned animals. Cats, dogs, rabbits, goats, bush babies, parrots, monkeys and even snakes were just a few of his wartime residents at his house, Clymping Dene. Many people brought their animals because they had to leave due to the war. When the war ended five years later, he tried to return their pets. Many owners, however, did not want them back, so Buster had to take care of all of them.

Buster was passionate about natural health for all the animals he kept. He founded Denes in 1951, which produces herbal veterinary products for animals.

Buster wrote an autobiography entitled The Animals Came in One by One and a sequel, Come into my World. He also wrote two instructional books: Love on a Lead and Natural Health For Your Pets.

Buster was forced into an early retirement after he was diagnosed as terminally ill. He said his main regret about his loss of health was that it made it impractical to keep many animals during his final years.

== Bibliography ==
=== Autobiographical ===
- The Animals Came in One by One (1966)
- Come into my World (1972)

=== Instructional ===
- Love on a Lead (1975)
- Natural Health For Your Pets
