= Buster (band) =

English rock band (1972–1982)

- Origin: Liverpool, England
- Genres: Power pop, rock
- Years active: 1972–1982
- Labels: RCA, RVC/BMG
- Past members: Rob Fennah; Pete Leay; Kevin Roberts; Les Brians
- Website: myspace.com/busteruk

Buster were an English rock band, formed on the Wirral, near Liverpool, in 1972.

Buster sent one song "Sunday" to the UK Singles Chart, and the band were popular especially in Japan, Europe and Australia in the late 1970s. At Christmastime in 1977, the band toured Japan, the Philippines, Australia and Germany, and performed live at the Budokan, the Sydney Opera House. The band had a number of hit singles and albums. As of 2022, almost all songs are available on major music distribution sites.

== History ==
=== Formation and early years (1972–77) ===
Buster was formed in March 1972 on the Wirral, near Liverpool, England. Its original members included Pete Leay (lead guitar), Kevin Roberts (bass guitar) and Les Brians (drums) (Rob Fennah (rhythm guitar) joined a year later). They were originally called 'The New Attraction', and began playing the cabaret circuit in north Wales. The average age of the members was thirteen.

The band released a limited edition 7-inch EP in January 1974. They signed to RCA immediately on leaving school and changed their name to 'Buster'.

In May 1976, Buster released their debut single, "Sunday", which reached #46 in the UK Singles Chart.

RVC (presently BMG) which was the Japanese division of RCA released "Sunday" in Japan in January 1977. The single was a Top 10 hit. Four further singles followed and all were Top 20 hits in Japan. At Christmastime in 1977, the band toured Japan(Koriyama, Osaka, Kurashiki, Kyoto, Fukuoka, Hiroshima, Nagoya, Tokyo), the Philippines, Australia and Germany.

Buster played live on Japanese television and performed two sell-out concerts at the Budokan arena in one day. The band also picked up a gold disc for record sales in Japan.

In Australia the band performed as part of the Festival of Sydney in 1977, on the steps of the Sydney Opera House.

=== Returning to Britain and Alternative Radio (1978–82) ===
In January 1978, the band arrived back in the UK. They had achieved five hit singles and three best selling albums overseas and expectations were high, but Buster's teenage image was outdated, and RCA and the band parted the company in 1979.

Their new manager suggested they changed their name to 'The Jax'. In 1980, on a small independent record label, they released one single under this name with a cover version of "Bits and Pieces", which was originally recorded by The Dave Clark Five. The single did not make any impression, and the band split from the manager and re-grouped. At this point, Pete Leay left the band to concentrate on studio recording.

Rob Fennah had started to write songs with his younger brother, Alan. The twosome also played in local pubs and clubs as the duo Rob and Alan Fennah and built up a substantial following in the Merseyside area.

During 1981, Buster's three original members Fennah, Brians and Roberts dropped the name 'Buster' and used the band name 'Alternative Radio' which was also the title of a song written by Rob & Alan Fennah. In 1982, they decided to enter the Liverpool 'Battle of the Bands' competition, which they won. However, shortly after, Brians left the band. Rob Fennah retained the name Alternative Radio, forming a new band line-up around the acoustic duo with brother Alan.

In 1983, The Fennah brothers (Alternative Radio) signed to EMI (Parlophone) and released their debut single 'Valley Of Evergreen'.in January 1984. started the band activity(Alternative Radio-YouTube).

=== Recent years (2008–present) ===
When footage of Buster turned up on the internet, there was interest in the group and demand for the re-release of old recordings. They were able to buy back the rights to the recordings, and Buster's records were produced again for the Japanese market, as CD formats. They also showed some of their early footage on their website. In 2014, an album containing 10 new songs recorded intermittently by members was released as a CD version in Japan. In 2021, the early albums(CD version) were released on major music distribution sites, and almost all songs are available by digital download, streaming.

In 2008, Fennah, Leay, and Roberts were invited to the Liverpool Museum at the opening of The Beat Goes On, an exhibition of Liverpool popular music and culture. Buster are featured in the "Global Impact" section of the exhibition, in recognition of the band's success in Japan. In 2014, The British Embassy in Tokyo published a list of the most successful top 25 UK bands in Japan since the Beatles. Buster was one of them.

Pete Leay died on 26 December 2013 at home on the Wirral./Tribute to Pete Leay-YouTube

Les Brians died on 11 November 2016 in Germany./Tribute to Les 'Brians' Smith-YouTube

In addition to music(band, solo, stage and video music, Guitar Lesson/Fennah Rob-YouTube), Fennah continues to be active in a wide range of activities such as writing and stage production.

== Band members ==
- Rob Fennah - vocals, rhythm guitar /Rob Fennah Official Website
- Pete Leay - lead guitar, vocals
- Kevin Roberts - bass, vocals
- Les Brians - drums, vocals

== Discography ==
=== Albums ===
- Buster (UK & Japan) 1977 / 2008 CD format *including 4 bonus tracks (Japan) / 2021 digital download
- Buster 2 (Japan) 1977/ 2008 CD format *including 4 bonus tracks (Japan) (Japan) / 2021 digital download
- Buster Live (Japan) 1977/ 2008 CD format *including 3 bonus tracks (Japan) (Japan) / 2021 digital download
- Diary: Best Collection (Japan) 1978
- Best & New (Japan) 2014/ 2017 digital download *album title "Here and Now", 10 new songs only

=== Singles ===
- "Sunday" / "Salt Lake City - Silver Gun" (UK) RCA 1976 – #49 (UK)
- "Beautiful Child" / "Daybreak" (UK) RCA 1976
- "Sunday" / "Daybreak" (Japan) RCA 1977
- "Love Rules OK" / "Who Told You" (Japan) 1977
- "Dance with Me" / "Salt Lake City - Silver Gun" (Japan) 1977
- "Beautiful Child" / "But If It Happens" (Japan) RCA 1977
- "She Ain't My Baby" / "Certain Kind of Feeling" (Japan) 1978
