= Russian gunboat Sivuch (1884) =

Imperial Russian Navy gunboat

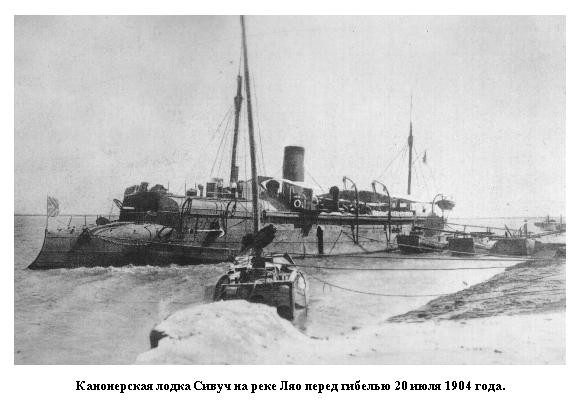
- Sivuch on the Liao River in 1904.

History

Russian Empire
- Name: Sivuch
- Namesake: Sealion
- Builder: Bergsunds Yard, Stockholm, Sweden
- Laid down: 1883
- Launched: 1884
- Completed: 1885
- Fate: Scuttled 2 August 1904

General characteristics
- Class & type: Sivuch-class gunboat
- Displacement: 1,134 long tons (1,152 t)
- Length: 187 ft 6 in (57.2 m) (waterline)
- Beam: 35 ft 6 in (10.8 m)
- Draught: 9 ft 6 in (2.9 m) maximum
- Propulsion: 6 cylindrical boilers, 2-shaft horizontal compound, 1,130 ihp (843 KW), 250 tons coal maximum
- Speed: 11.5 kn (21.3 km/h; 13.2 mph)
- Complement: 170
- Armament: 1 × 9in/30 gun 1 × 6in/28 gun 6 × 4.2 in/20 guns 4 × 1-pounder revolvers
- Notes: Brig-rigged as built; later 3-masted

Sivuch (Russian - Сивуч; "sealion") was a Sivuch-class gunboat of the Imperial Russian Navy. She entered service in 1884 and was powered by sail and steam. She took an active role in mapping the northern Pacific Ocean and nearby seas as well as periodically being stationed in Chinese and Korean ports and protecting seal rookeries, principally from American poachers. She also took part in the suppression of the Boxer Rebellion (1899–1901).

Sivuch spent the winter of 1903-1904 iced in with the Royal Navy sloop-of-war HMS Espiegle and a United States Navy gunboat at Niuzhuang at the mouth of the Liao River on the Bohai Sea coast of Manchuria. The three vessels were there when the Russo-Japanese War broke out in February 1904. When the ice broke up in the spring of 1904, Espiegle and the U.S. Navy gunboat left, but Sivuch remained. Niuzhuang and the Liao River were in Chinese territory, so initially the Russians disarmed Sivuch in recognition of Chinese neutrality, but as their concern over the possibility of a Japanese landing in the vicinity of Niuzhuang grew, they occupied the Niuzhuang area and rearmed Sivuch. Sivuch′s presence at Niuzhuang and on the Liao River was a matter of concern to the Imperial Japanese Navy during the early months of the war. As Imperial Japanese Army forces advanced on Niuzhuang and the Liao River in the summer of 1904, her presence became a concern for Japanese ground forces as well.

Imperial Japanese Army cavalry occupied Niuzhuang on 25 July 1904, and Sivuch withdrew up the Liao River accompanied by a flotilla of four armed steam launches. On 1 August 1904, an Imperial Japanese Navy force consisting of the gunboats Atago, Tsukushi, and Uji and a division of torpedo boats arrived at the mouth of the Liao River with orders to assist the Japanese Second Army in guarding the river and to destroy Sivuch and her accompanying launches if possible. With Sivuch trapped in the upper reaches of the river by superior Japanese forces, her crew scuttled her by blowing her up on 2 August 1904.

== Bibliography ==
- Chesneau, Roger, and Eugene M. Kolesnik, eds., Conway′s All the World′s Fighting Ships 1860-1905, New York: Mayflower Books, 1979, ISBN 0-8317-0302-4.
- Corbett, Julian S., Maritime Operations in the Russo-Japanese War, Volume I, Annapolis, Maryland: Naval Institute Press, 1994, ISBN 1-55750-129-7.
- (in German) Mitteilungen aus dem Gebiete des Seewesens, Band 12. C. Gerold's Sohn in Wien, 1884. (Original from the University of Michigan, digitalized 20 November 2008.)
- (in German) Guido von Frobel: Militär-Wochenblatt. Band 77, E.S. Mittler & Sohn. Berlin 1892.
- (in German) Oswald Flamm: Schiffbau: Zeitschrift für de Gesamte Industrie auf Schiffbautechnischen und Verwandten Gebieten. Band 6, Berliner Union Verlagsgesellschaft 1904.
