= Eureka (ship) =

Eureka was a coal-powered steam ship built in 1884 by WM. Cramp & Sons and owned by Southern Development. The vessel was on a trip from New York to New Orleans carrying cargo before it collided with the S.S. Benison on May 7, 1888, about 60 miles away from Cape Henry.
