= Buster (1884 ship) =

19th century wooden ship

Buster was a 310-ton barquentine built in Nova Scotia, Canada in 1884. She was wrecked on 17 February 1893, while on a voyage from Sydney to New Zealand, when she was wrecked off Woolgoolga, New South Wales, Australia where she had gone to collect a load of timber for Port Chalmers, Dunedin. There were no deaths.

The wreck has been exposed in 2012 and 2021 during heavy seas washing away the sand on Woolgoolga Beach, north of Coffs Harbour.
