= HMS Gannet =

Nine ships and two shore establishments of the Royal Navy have borne the name HMS Gannet, after the seabird the Gannet:

== Ships ==
- HMS Gannet (1800) was a 16-gun brig-sloop purchased in 1800 and sold in 1814.
- HMS Gannet (1814) was an 18-gun Cruizer-class brig-sloop launched in 1814 and sold in 1838.
- HMS Gannet (1857) was a wooden Racer-class screw sloop launched in 1857 and broken up in 1887.
- HMS Gannet (1878) was an Doterel-class screw sloop launched in 1878. She became a training ship in 1903 and was renamed HMS President, and was then lent as the training ship Mercury, she was moored in Gosport, Hampshire for many years. She was transferred as a museum ship in 1987 and is preserved in dry dock at Chatham Dockyard.
- HMS Gannet was a composite Nymphe-class screw sloop launched in 1888 as Nymphe. She became a base ship and was renamed Wildfire in 1906, renamed Gannet in 1916, and then Pembroke in 1917. She was sold in 1920.
- HMS Gannet was a Medina-class iron screw gunboat launched in 1877 as Trent. She was renamed Pembroke in 1905, becoming a diving tender and being renamed Gannet in 1917. She was sold in 1923.
- HMS Gannet (1927) was a river gunboat launched in 1927 and transferred to the Chinese Navy in 1942, being renamed Ying Shan. She was on their lists until 1975.

== Shore establishments ==
- HMS Gannet (1943 shore establishment), was a Royal Navy stone frigate, the Royal Naval Air Station at Eglinton, County Londonderry, Northern Ireland, between 1943 and 1959.
- HMS Gannet II, the stone frigate RNAS Maydown, a satellite for RNAS Eglinton from 1945.
- HMS Gannet III (1946 shore establishment), the stone frigate RNAS Belfast, previously commissioned as HMS Gadwell and re-commissioned when it was assigned as a tender to RNAS Eglinton from 1946 to 1959.
- HMS Gannet (1971 shore establishment) is a Fleet Air Arm station established in 1971 at RNAS Prestwick in Ayrshire.

== Other ships ==
- Gannet was a tug built for the State of Victoria in 1884 and armed as an auxiliary gunboat. She was sold in 1905.
- LST 3006 was launched in 1945 and commissioned as HMS Tromsø in 1947. She was transferred to the Ministry of Transport as Empire Gannet in 1956 and was sold in 1968.
