= HMS Arrow =

Seven ships of the Royal Navy have been named HMS Arrow, after the projectile:

- HMS Arrow (1796), a 20-gun sloop launched in 1796 that the French frigates Incorruptible and Hortense captured near Gibraltar on 4 February 1805; she sank the same day.
- HMS Arrow (1805), a 14-gun cutter launched at Deptford Dockyard on 7 September 1805, and converted to a breakwater in May 1815. Broken up in May 1828.
- HMS Arrow (1823), a 10-gun cutter launched at Portsmouth on 14 March 1823 and broken up in January 1852.
- HMS Arrow (1854), a 477-ton Arrow-class wooden screw dispatch vessel launched at Leamouth on 26 June 1854 and sold on 19 May 1862.
- HMS Arrow (1871), an Ant-class iron gunboat launched at Greenwich on 22 April 1871 and sold on 1 March 1922.
- HMS Arrow (H42), launched 1929, was an A-class destroyer that served in World War II and was damaged beyond repair in Algiers harbour in 1944 when an ammunition ship exploded. The hulk was broken up in May 1949.
- HMS Arrow (F173), launched 1974, was a Type 21 frigate that served in the Falklands War. She was sold to Pakistan in 1994 and renamed PNS Khaibar (1994). She was sunk as a target in 2022.

The Royal Australian Navy 146-ton patrol boat HMAS Arrow (P 88) was launched on 17 February 1968 and was wrecked on 25 December 1974 at Darwin, Australia during Cyclone Tracy.

== Battle honours ==
Ships named Arrow have earned the following battle honours:

- Copenhagen, 1801
- Cape Tenez, 1805
- San Sebastian, 1813
- Crimea, 1854−55
- Norway, 1940
- Atlantic, 1940−43
- North Sea, 1942
- Libya, 1942
- Malta Convoys, 1942
- Sicily, 1943
- Falkland Islands, 1982
