= HMS Trent =

Six ships of the Royal Navy have borne the name HMS Trent, after the River Trent:

- HMS Trent (1757) was a 28-gun sixth-rate frigate launched in 1757 and sold in 1764.
- HMS Trent (1796) was a 36-gun fifth-rate frigate launched in 1796. She became a hospital ship in 1803, a receiving ship in 1818 and was broken up in 1823.
- HMS Trent (1818) was a modified whaling ship, commissioned to participate in a Canadian coastal survey and Arctic expedition.
- HMS Trent was a 17-gun sloop laid down in 1862. She was selected for conversion to an ironclad, and renamed HMS Research later that year, before being launched in 1863.
- HMS Trent (1877) was a Medina-class gunboat launched in 1877. She was renamed HMS Pembroke in 1905, and HMS Gannet in 1917 when she served as a diving tender. She was scrapped in 1923.
- HMS Trent was a passenger liner that was an armed merchant cruiser from 1915 to 1919.
- HMS Trent (K243) was a River-class frigate launched in 1942. She was transferred to the Royal Indian Navy in 1946 and was renamed Kukri. She was converted into a survey vessel in 1952 and renamed Investigator. She was broken up in 1975.
- HMS Trent (P224) is a Batch 2 River-class patrol vessel currently in service. She was commissioned on 3 August 2020.

== See also ==
- The mail steamship RMS Trent, at the centre of the Trent Affair.
