= Gor-class gunboat =

Class overview
- Builders: Karljohansverns Verft Naval Yard, Horten
- Operators: Royal Norwegian Navy
- Preceded by: Vale-class gunboat
- Succeeded by: HNoMS Æger
- Built: 1884–1887
- In commission: 1884–1945
- Completed: Gor; Tyr
- Scrapped: 2

General characteristics
- Type: Gunboat, later rebuilt as minelayer
- Displacement: 290 long tons (295 t)
- Length: 31.27 m (102 ft 7 in)
- Propulsion: Coal-fired reciprocating steam engines, 450 shp (336 kW)
- Speed: 10 knots (12 mph; 19 km/h)
- Complement: 44 (318 after rebuild)
- Armament: As built : 1 × 26 cm (10 in)/30 Krupp breechloading gun; 1 × 1-pounder (37 mm (1.5 in)) automatic gun; 2 × 1-pounder (37 mm (1.5 in)) revolving gun; After rebuild: 1 × 12 cm (4.7 in) gun; 1 × 76 mm (3.0 in) (Gor) or 1 × 57 mm (2.2 in) QF gun (Tyr); 2 × 37 mm (1.5 in) guns; 55 mines

The Gor class was a class of two Rendel (or "flat-iron") gunboats built for the Royal Norwegian Navy between 1884 and 1887. Small, nimble vessels, they were armed with a single large-caliber gun for offensive purposes and several small, quick-firing guns for self-defense.

The main gun was large for such a small craft, roughly a quarter of the length of the whole vessel, and of the same caliber as heavy battleship guns of the same era. The Gor class was likely built in the belief that the ships would be able to inflict serious damage to an opposing battleship.

== Service history and fate ==
Shortly before the First World War, both vessels were rebuilt as minelayers. During this reconstruction, the heavy, large-caliber gun was replaced with a more modern 12 cm breech-loader, and one of the 37 mm guns was replaced with a more potent 57 mm (Tyr) or 76 mm (Gor) gun. With the heavy gun and ammunition removed, these diminutive vessels could carry a useful number of mines.

Both vessels were kept in service until the German invasion in 1940, and both fell into German hands for the remainder of the war.

After the Second World War, the vessels were returned to the Royal Norwegian Navy, and subsequently decommissioned.
