= HNoMS Gor (1884) =

Gunboat

History

Norway
- Name: Gor
- Namesake: Gór – mythological co-founder of Norway
- Builder: Karljohansvern Naval Yard in Horten
- Launched: 7 May 1884
- Commissioned: 1884
- Captured: by the Germans in 1940

Service record
- Operations: Norwegian Campaign

Nazi Germany
- Acquired: 1940
- Fate: Handed back to Norway after VE Day

Service record
- Operations: Occupation of Norway by Nazi Germany

Norway
- Acquired: 1945
- Decommissioned: 1945
- Fate: Scrapped

General characteristics as built
- Class & type: Gor-class Rendel gunboat
- Displacement: 290 tons
- Length: 31.27 m (102.59 ft)
- Propulsion: 420 hp steam engine
- Speed: 10 knots (18.52 km/h)
- Complement: 44
- Armament: 1 × 26cm/30 (10.2 inch) Krupp breechloading gun; 1 × 1pdr (37 mm / 1.46 inch) automatic gun; 2 × 1pdr (37 mm / 1.46 inch) revolving gun

General characteristics after rebuild
- Displacement: 290 tons
- Length: 31.27 m (102.59 ft)
- Propulsion: 420 hp steam engine
- Speed: 10 knots (18.52 km/h)
- Complement: 38
- Armament: 2 × 76 mm (3 inch) QF gun; 2 × 37mm (1.46 inch) guns; 55 mines

The HNoMS Gor was a Gor-class Rendel gunboat built for the Royal Norwegian Navy at Karljohansvern Naval Yard in Horten in 1884. She was one of a class of two gunboats - the other ship in her class being Tyr. The Gor and Tyr can be seen as improved Vale-class gunboats.

== Construction and armament ==
Gor was built at Karljohansvern Naval Yard in Horten, and had yard number 64.

Her main gun was 7.8m meters long, or about a quarter of the length of the whole vessel. In addition she was armed with three smaller, automatic guns for self defence.

Shortly before World War I, Gor was rebuilt as a mine layer. During this rebuild, the heavy gun and one of the 37 mm guns was replaced with two more potent 76 mm guns. Since the heavy gun and ammunition was removed, Gor could carry 55 mines.

== Service history ==
Gor was kept in service until the German invasion in 1940. Until the surrender of Norwegian forces in southern Norway, she mostly operated in the Sognefjord, and she fell into German hands for the remainder of the war.

After World War II, Gor was returned to the Royal Norwegian Navy, and scrapped shortly thereafter.

== Bibliography ==
- Abelsen, Frank (1986). Norwegian naval ships 1939-1945 (in Norwegian and English). Oslo: Sem & Stenersen AS. ISBN 82-7046-050-8.
