= HMSAS Afrikander =

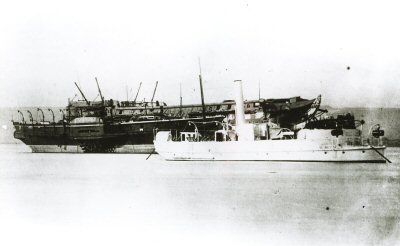
- Tickler's sister ship, Mastiff (foreground, in white)

History

United Kingdom
- Name: HMS Tickler
- Owner: Royal Navy
- Builder: Pembroke Dock, Wales
- Cost: c. £13,000
- Launched: 15 September 1879
- Renamed: Afrikander on 26 February 1919
- Home port: Simon's Town from 1885
- Fate: Converted to steam lighter in 1902; Transferred to South African Seaward Defence Force in 1923

South Africa
- Name: HMSAS Afrikander
- Owner: South African Naval Services
- Acquired: 1923
- Commissioned: 15 June 1923
- Decommissioned: December 1932
- Out of service: Returned to Royal Navy as Afrikander II

United Kingdom
- Name: HMS Afrikander II
- Owner: Royal Navy
- Fate: Broken up at Simon's Town in 1937

General characteristics
- Class & type: Gadfly-class flat-iron gunboat
- Displacement: 254 tons standard
- Length: 85 ft (26 m)
- Beam: 26 ft 1.5 in (7.963 m)
- Draught: 6 ft (1.8 m)
- Installed power: 260 ihp (190 kW)
- Propulsion: Two 2-cylinder horizontal single-expansion steam engines; Two screws
- Speed: 8.5 kn (15.7 km/h)
- Crew: 30
- Armament: One 10-inch (18 ton) muzzle-loading rifle (removed in 1902)

HMS Tickler was a Royal Navy Gadfly-class flat-iron gunboat launched in 1879. She was transferred to Simon's Town in South Africa in 1885 and converted to a steam lighter in 1902. In 1919 she became HMS Afrikander and was transferred to the South African Naval Service in 1923, becoming HMSAS Afrikander. She was returned to the Royal Navy in December 1932 and re-named HMS Afrikander II in 1933. She was finally broken up at Simon's Town in 1937.

== Royal Navy gunboat ==
Tickler was launched on 15 September 1879 as the last of the Royal Navy Gadfly-class flat-iron gunboats. She was listed at Portsmouth "for coastal defence" in 1881 and in 1885, during the Russian War Scare, she, Gadfly and Griper were towed to the Cape by the transports Richmond Hill and Kimberley. She was recommissioned in South Africa in 1891. At Simon's Town in 1902 she was converted to a steam lighter.

== Base ship, Simon's Town ==
She was used as a base depot ship servicing the Royal Navy and South African Naval Services fleets in Simon's Town harbour and False Bay. She was renamed HMS Afrikander in 1919. When the South African Naval Service was created on 1 April 1922, all officers and men were nominally registered in the books of Afrikander. This was required because the Naval Discipline Act stated that in order to be subservient to the Act, all members had to be serving on a HM Ship. The Act was amended in 1923 and Afrikander was then transferred to the Union of South African Seaward Defence Force as HMSAS Afrikander. (Note: His (or Her) Majesty's South African Ship) She was returned to the Royal Navy in December 1932 and renamed HMS Afrikander II in 1933.

== Fate ==
After decommissioning she was scuttled and sunk by gunfire from HMS Daffodil, at Simonstown in 1937.
