= HNoMS Tyr (1887) =

Norwegian gunboat

History

Norway
- Name: Tyr
- Namesake: Týr – god of single combat and heroic glory in Norse mythology
- Builder: Karljohansvern Naval Yard in Horten
- Yard number: 67
- Laid down: 1884
- Launched: 16 March 1887
- Commissioned: 1887
- Captured: by the Germans 20 April 1940

Service record
- Commanders: Captain F. Ulstrup (?-16 April 1940); Sub-Lieutenant K. Sandnæs; (16–20 April 1940)
- Operations: Norwegian Campaign
- Victories: Sunk: 3 supply ships, 2 naval trawlers; 1 launch; Damaged: 1 e-boat; 1 naval trawler; 1 supply ship

Nazi Germany
- Name: Tyr
- Acquired: 20 April 1940
- Fate: Handed back to Norway after VE Day

Service record
- Operations: Norwegian Campaign; Occupation of Norway by Nazi Germany

Norway
- Name: Tyr
- Decommissioned: 1945
- Renamed: Bjørn West (1949)
- Fate: Sold to civilian owners in 1946, converted into car ferry
- Status: Under restoration as of 2014

General characteristics as built
- Class & type: Gor-class Rendel gunboat
- Displacement: 290 tons
- Length: 31.8 m (104.33 ft)
- Beam: 8.5 m (27.89 ft)
- Draft: 2.2 m (7.22 ft)
- Propulsion: Two 420 hp Compound steam engines
- Speed: 10 knots (18.52 km/h)
- Complement: 44 men
- Armament: 1 × 26cm/30 (10.2 inch) Krupp breech-loading gun; 1 × 1pdr (37 mm / 1.46 inch) automatic gun; 2 × 1pdr (37 mm / 1.46 inch) revolving gun; 2 × Madsen machine gun

General characteristics after rebuild to minelayer
- Displacement: 290 tons
- Length: 31.8 m (104.33 ft)
- Beam: 8.5 m (27.89 ft)
- Draft: 2.2 m (7.22 ft)
- Propulsion: Two 420 hp Compound steam engines
- Speed: 10 knots (18.52 km/h)
- Complement: 38 men
- Armament: 1 × 12 cm (4.72 inch) gun; 1 × 76 mm (2.99 inch) QF gun; 2 × 37mm (1.46 inch) guns; 55 mines

HNoMS Tyr was a Gor-class Rendel gunboat built for the Royal Norwegian Navy at Karljohansverns Verft Naval Yard in Horten. She was laid down in 1884 and launched in 1887 with build number 67. Tyr was one of a class of two gunboats - the other ship in her class being HNoMS Gor. Gor and Tyr can be seen as improved Vale-class gunboats, of 290 tons instead of the 250 tons standard for that class.

Captured during the German invasion of Norway, she was pressed into service in an attempt to mine Sognefjord. After attacks by Norwegian aircraft and ships she took no further part in the conflict. After the war she was returned briefly to the Royal Norwegian Navy then entered civilian service in a number of roles over the years.

== Characteristics ==
The main gun of the ship was 7.8m meters long, or about a quarter of the length of the whole vessel. In addition she was armed with three revolving guns for closer ranges.

Shortly before the First World War, Tyr was rebuilt as a minelayer. During this rebuild, the heavy gun was replaced with a more modern 12 cm breech-loader, and one of the 37 mm guns was replaced with a more potent 76 mm gun. After the heavy gun and ammunition were removed, she could carry 55 mines.

By 1940, two Madsen machine guns had been added for anti-aircraft purposes.

== Service ==
=== German invasion of Norway ===
==== Mining the Bergen approaches ====
On 9 April 1940, the day of the German invasion of Norway, the commander of Lerøy guard district, Captain F. Ulstrup, received a message informing him that German warships had forced their way past the small Lerøy Fort on their way towards Bergen. Captain Ulstrup immediately boarded Tyr and sailed out to mine the Lerøyosen approaches to the south-western Norwegian city. At 0130hrs the Norwegian minelayer began mining the stretch of water between Lerøy island and Sotra, putting out seven mines right before the German invasion flotilla arrived at Lerøyosen. Making good her escape Tyr placed another sixteen mines in the Vatlestraumen approaches north of Bergen.

Due to a built-in time delay the Lerøyosen mines were not active when the German warships passed over them. However by the time the supply fleet of the German forces in the Bergen area started coming into Lerøyosen late in the evening the mines were ready. The first ship to hit the mines was the 4,297 ton supply ship Sao Paulo, which sank with a great loss of both lives and materiel at 2300hrs, 9 April. As the mine barrier had now been discovered the Kriegsmarine needed to sweep the Lerøyosen but had no dedicated minesweepers in the area. In an improvised reaction to the mines the invaders sent out the naval trawlers Schiff 9 and Cremon, together with two launches from the depot ship Karl Peters. The improvised minesweeper force entered the mine barrier in the evening of 10 April and began clearing the mines. At 1925hrs Schiff 9 struck a mine and went down in between one and two minutes. At 19.30 hours as Cremon tried to rescue survivors she too blew up together with one of the two launches.

Later on 27 April the 8,500 ton German merchant ship Liege was sunk by one of the mines. The 4,601 ton German steamer Johann Wessels was damaged by one of the mines on 5 May 1940. Three days later, on 8 May 1940, the 1,151 ton German-controlled Danish steamer Gerda hit a mine and sank. All in all the Germans lost three supply ships, two naval trawlers and a launch sunk by mines laid by Tyr.

==== Guarding the southern sea lane ====
After laying her mines Tyr resumed guarding the southern sea lane to Bergen and soon met up with German naval forces. Off the island of Skorpo she had a clash with an E-boat, neither vessel being hit. Tyr then withdrew behind the cover of Forstrøno island, but was chased down by a further three German E-boats. After a brief fight Tyr drove the enemy ships off, damaging one of the German vessels severely with a 37 mm shell.

=== Norwegian Campaign ===
==== To the Hardangerfjord, change of command ====
Later in the Norwegian Campaign, on 16 April, Tyr moved to Uskedal in Ytre Hardangerfjord, where her captain became the commander of the newly created Hardangerfjord naval district. The second-in-command, Sub-Lieutenant K. Sandnæs, took over the minelayer. While in the Hardangerfjord she took part in the Battle of Uskedal in the early hours of 20 April.

==== Battle of Uskedal ====
From her anchorage south of Uskedal Tyr first damaged an E-boat and then, with her 12 cm main gun, put a large hole below the waterline of the armed trawler Schiff 18 forcing her to be beached to avoid sinking. At 05.30 a.m. the battle turned against the Norwegians as another trawler, Schiff 221 landed more troops at Trones which advanced on Uskedal from a new direction. All the while during the battle Tyr was providing naval gunfire support from her position in the Storsund midway between Uskedal and Herøysund, bombarding the Germans with high explosive shells. Even though she came under heavy machine gun fire from German troops, Tyr helped the Norwegian land forces hold their ground until taken by surprise by the sudden arrival of the German artillery training ship Bremse. Fire from the larger enemy ship forced Tyr to back out the fight and go to the docks in Uskedal. After a short while at anchor Tyr was ordered back into the fight to help the torpedo boat Stegg that was fighting Bremse. Once Tyr returned to the battle she again gained the attention of the German warship and was forced to take cover in a small bay at Skorpo. As Sub-Lieutenant Sandnæs now considered the battle as hopeless he ordered his crew ashore to rest, also sending small arms and ammunition on land. Sandnæs started preparations to scuttle his ship with explosives, but before he could carry out his intentions two E-boats entered the bay and boarded Tyr. Before long Schiff 221 arrived and took Tyr in tow. By afternoon Tyr was on her way back to Bergen with a German crew.

=== German service ===
==== Sognefjord with Uller ====
In German hands Tyr was first used together with fellow captured Norwegian minelayer Uller in a plan by Admiral Otto von Schrader to mine the entrance to the Sognefjord on 30 April. Together the two ships could carry 80 mines and quite effectively block in the Norwegian naval forces in the country's longest fjord. However, the Norwegian forces in the fjord had a very effective system of look-outs and guard ships. Before the two minelayers even had entered Sognefjord they were attacked by two of the Royal Norwegian Navy Air Service's M.F.11 biplane patrol aircraft. The seaplanes dropped nine bombs at the two minelayers, failing to damage either of the ships but wounding three sailors on Uller with shrapnel. Having escaped damage in this attack the minelayers continued north and started laying mines at the entrance to the Sognefjord. In the early hours of 1 May the Norwegians threw another seaplane attack against the German mining operation. A single Norwegian Heinkel He 115 made two dive bombing attacks on Tyr and Uller, dropping one 250 kg bomb and four 50 kg bombs on the fiercely resisting ships. None of the bombs were direct hits, but one near miss damaged the side of Uller, causing sea water to flood into her. Uller had to be beached on Losneøy island and thereafter scuttled by the only slightly damaged Tyr.

==== Ambush ====
After scuttling Uller, Tyr abandoned her mining mission and retreated southwards to Bergen, carrying the crew of Uller with her. Norwegian scouts were however still following her. Before the minelayer got back to base she was ambushed in the Fålefotsundet narrows between Hisøya and the mainland by the crew of a Norwegian guard boat that had been stalking her since leaving the Sognefjord. The crew had taken up positions on both sides of the narrows and opened a harrowing fire on the minelayer as she passed through. As Tyr was shot up with intense machine gun fire the German crew replied with her 12 cm main gun and automatic weapons without hitting any in the ambush force. The fire fight continued until Tyr had passed through the narrows and got out of range of the Norwegians' light weaponry, making it back to Bergen. Tyr saw no further service during the Norwegian Campaign.

After the Fålefotsundet ambush Tyr took no further part in the Norwegian Campaign. What the Germans used the minelayer for after that is unknown.

=== Post war ===
After the Second World War, Tyr was returned to the Royal Norwegian Navy, and sold into civilian service. Her first rebuild was in 1946 when she converted to a heavy lift steamship. In 1949 she was sold to Br. Wilhelmsen A/S and rebuilt as a car ferry, being renamed Bjørn West in 1951 and was used as such by different companies for many years. In May 1986 she was rebuilt at Karmøy, this time as a heavy-transport ship. Later she was sold to a salmon farm company and as of 2006 was still in existence as a floating storage vessel, at last report entering Eidsvik shipyard in May 2014 for restoration. Bjørn West was seen in a drydock in Kristiansad in July 2025, undergoing restoration to her 1940 condition.

== Bibliography ==
- Abelsen, Frank (1986). Norwegian naval ships 1939-1945 (in Norwegian and English). Oslo: Sem & Stenersen AS. ISBN 82-7046-050-8.
- Berg, Ole F. (1997). I skjærgården og på havet – Marinens krig 8. april 1940 – 8. mai 1945 (in Norwegian). Oslo: Marinens krigsveteranforening. ISBN 82-993545-2-8.
- Daatland, John (1993). Den lange veien (in Norwegian). J. Daatland.
- Hauge, Andreas (1995). Kampene i Norge 1940 (in Norwegian). Vol. 1. Sandefjord: Krigshistorisk Forlag. ISBN 82-993369-0-2.
