= Ever-class gunboat =

Class of gunboats of the Royal Netherlands Navy

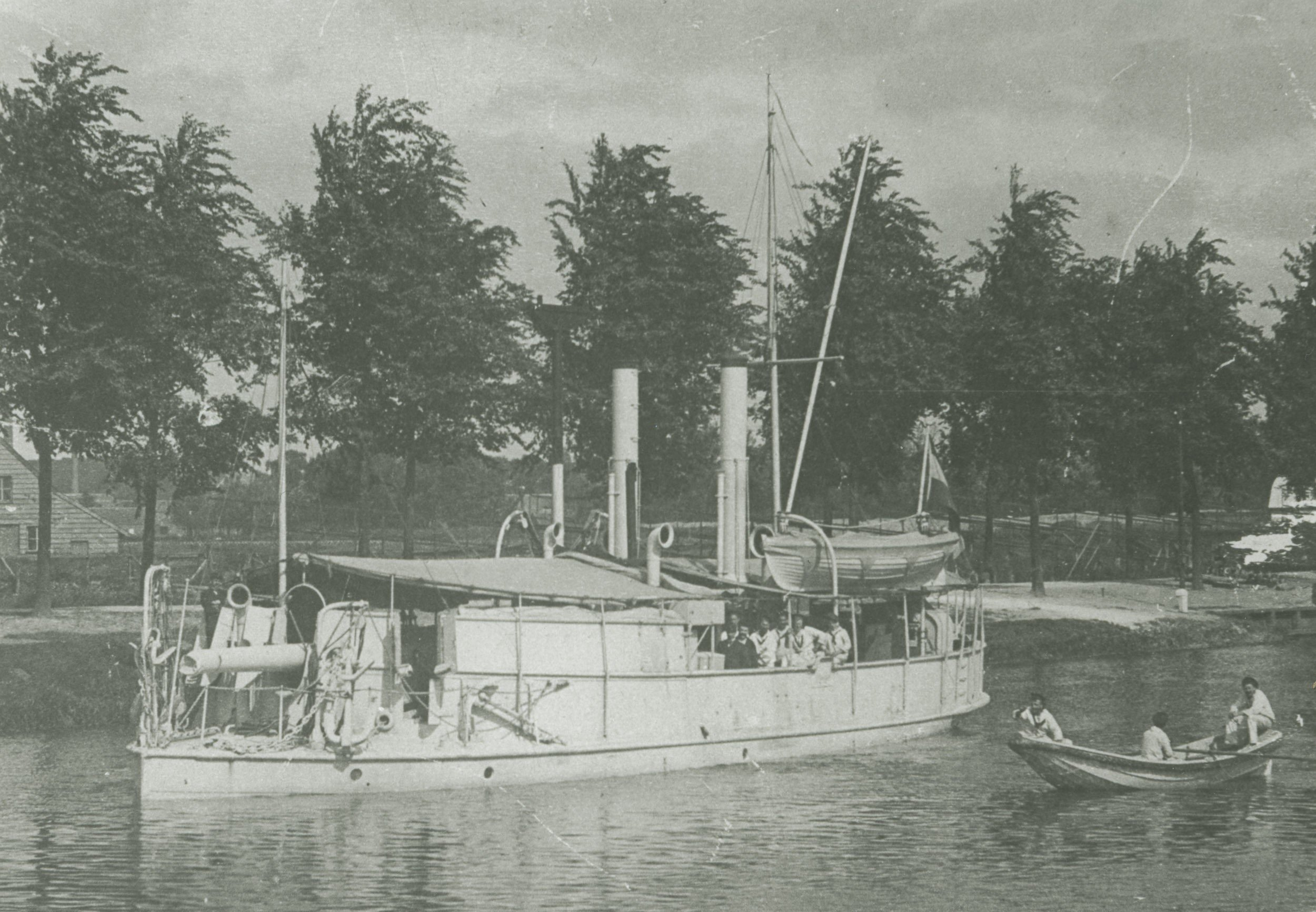
- The gunboat Bever in Utrecht (note the gun)

Class overview
- Name: Ever class
- Builders: multiple
- Operators: Royal Netherlands Navy
- Succeeded by: Wodan class
- Cost: 102,600 (Ever, Hydra); 142,600 (the rest)
- Completed: 14
- Scrapped: 14

General characteristics
- Type: Gunboat
- Tonnage: 90
- Displacement: 196 tons
- Length: 24.76 m (81 ft 3 in)
- Beam: 7.62 m (25 ft 0 in)
- Draught: 2.06 m (6 ft 9 in)
- Depth of hold: 2.67 m (8 ft 9 in)
- Installed power: 30 nominal hp; 110 indicated horsepower
- Speed: 7-8 kn
- Complement: 23
- Armament: 1* 23 cm Armstrong RML
- Armour: none

The Ever class was a class of 14 flat-iron gunboats of the Royal Netherlands Navy.

== Context ==
=== Turret ship and Monitor ===
In the 1860s acquiring a fleet of armored ships had been the first priority of the Dutch navy. The efforts focused on acquiring ironclad ram turret ships for defending the approaches to the main harbors, and monitors to defend the coast and to fight on the big rivers. The foundations of this program had been laid down in a report by a commission to review the coastal defense (Commissie tot het herzien der kustverdediging), which had sent in its report on 22 October 1864. The commission did not say anything about unarmored types of ships, but a few gunboats were indeed acquired.

=== A change of policy ===
In 1870 the minister for the navy Lodewijk Gerard Brocx announced a change of policy. He stated that in the previous years the establishment of an armored squadron for the defense of the sea harbors and lower rivers had been a top priority. However, with 5 monitors expected to be complete by the end of the year, and 5 more under construction, the demands for that defense could be considered to have been met. It was therefore no longer responsible to postpone the replacement of the screw steamships first class (Djambi-class corvette, Zilveren Kruis-class corvette) which defended the East Indies. To tender to this need, he wanted to lay down an ironclad (the HNLMS Koning der Nederlanden) instead of more monitors. In the interest of coastal and river defense two heavily armed gunboats modeled on the (British) Staunch class would be built.

=== Ordering ===
By mid 1871 the Dutch authorities were negotiating with William Armstrong & Co in Newcastle on Tyne for two Ever class gunboats. The first ships built in the Netherlands were built by the Rijkswerf Amsterdam. The first order to commercial shipyards in the Netherlands was for three gunboats at the Koninklijke Fabriek in Amsterdam and three at Fijenoord.

== Characteristics ==
=== General ===
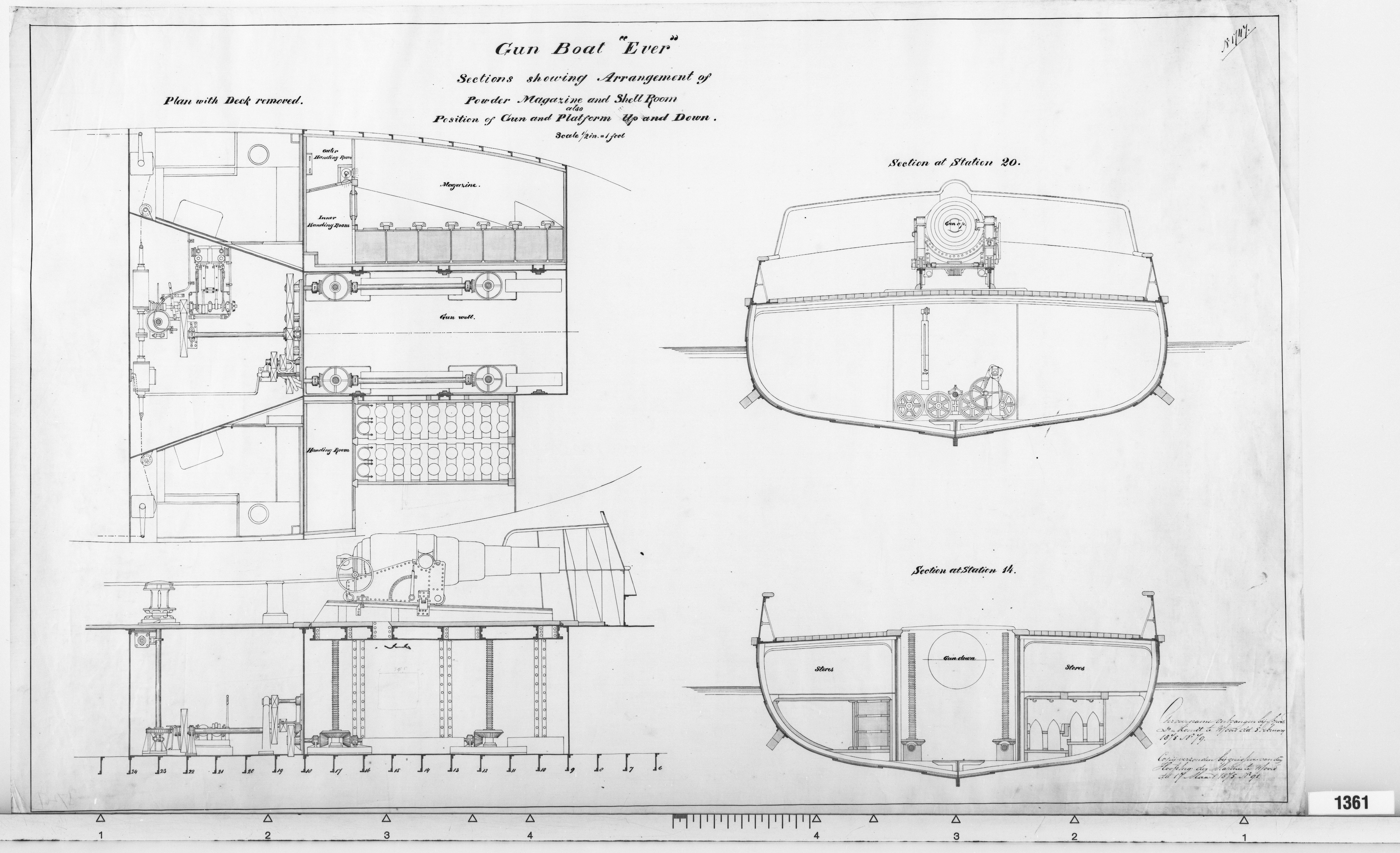
hydraulic lift for gun mount on Ever

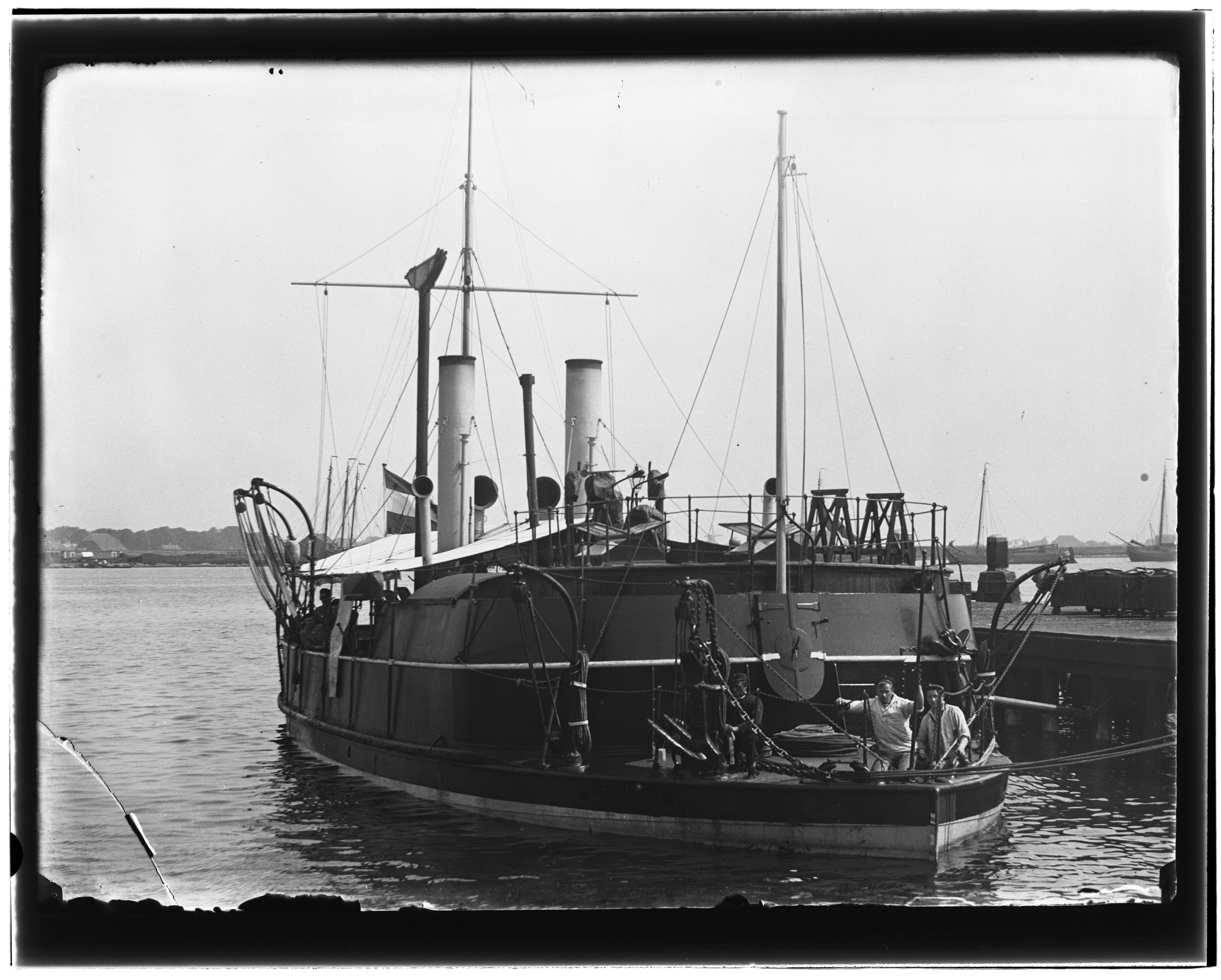
Ever in Amsterdam, 1899

The Ever class was modeled on the British gunboat Staunch. In the end both the Dutch Navy and the Royal Navy would model a gunboat after the Staunch. For the Royal Navy this would become a gunboat armed with a 10 inch gun, the Ant-class gunboat. The Dutch navy stayed closer to the original Staunch, by opting for a 9 inch gun. The obvious reason to do this was that the Dutch navy had recently ordered ironclads and monitors with the same 9 inch gun.

The Ever class was less than 25 m long. The design was completely tuned to bearing one heavy gun of 23 cm caliber, with ammunition, crew and propulsion. For such a small vessel it carried a very heavy gun. In order to preserve seaworthiness, the Ever had a machine to raise and lower the gun and carriage. For travel in rough weather or at open sea, the gun could then be fastened at a position lower in the hold for better stability. In effect this did not prove useful. In the Ever the apparatus was replaced by a fixed mounting. In later units it was left out. The retracting apparatus of the Hydra (cf. below) suffered the same fate. All later ships had a pivot that allowed to aim the gun in three fixed directions. The gunboats had no armor, but a parapet of iron sheaths covered the crew from rifle fire. Many photo's show three openings for the firing positions.

=== Propulsion ===
Each ship of the Ever class had two compound engines with vertical cylinders. There were two boilers that each had its own fire. The nominal power of each boiler was 15 hp. There were two screws, a requirement for good maneuverability in small spaces.

=== Armament ===
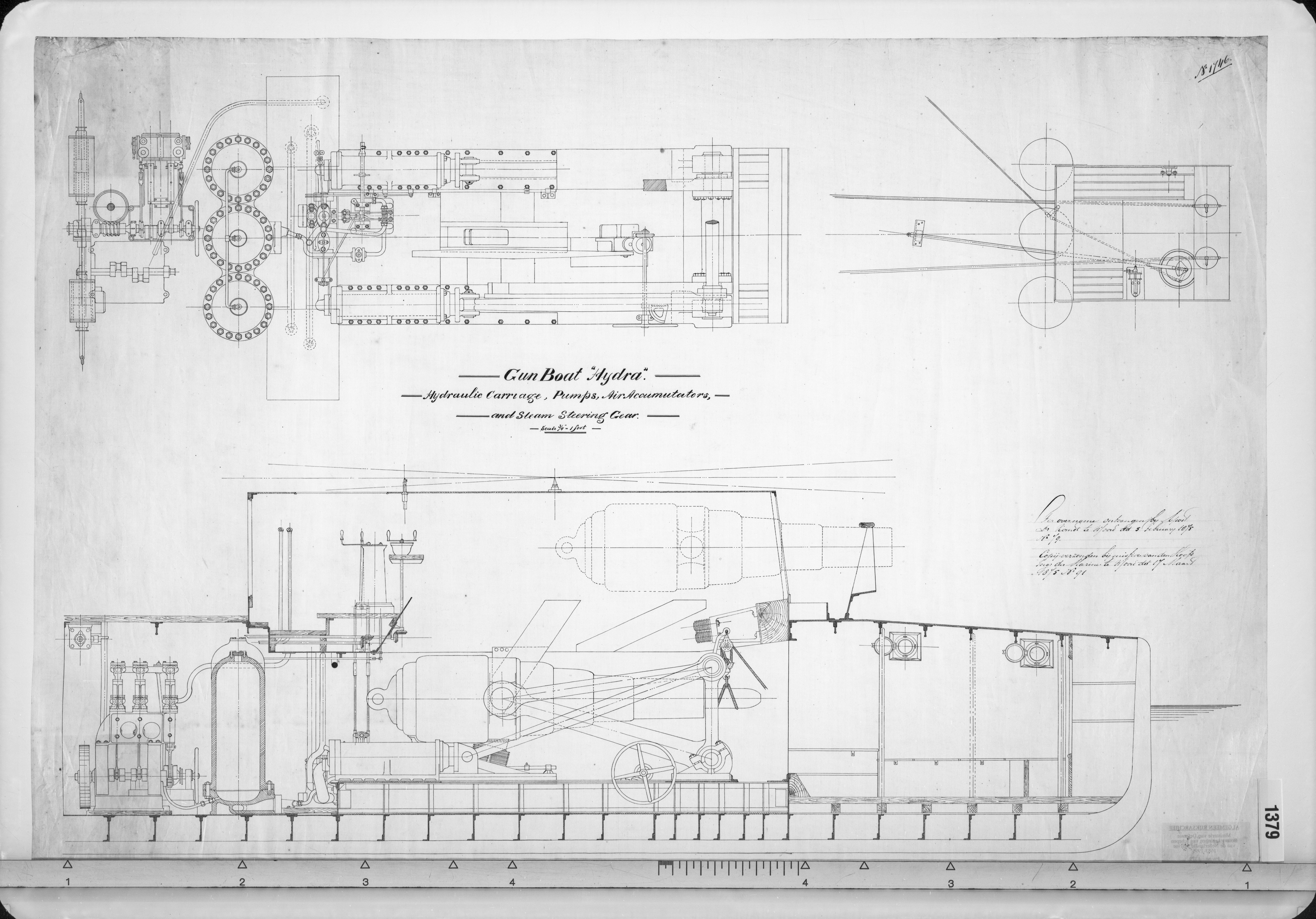
Design drawing of the disappearing gun on Hydra

The ships were armed with the RML 9-inch Armstrong Gun. This rifled muzzle loading gun of 23 cm caliber was produced by Armstrong. Tideman gives the weight of this gun as 13,000 kg, adding that the carriage and sled weighed 4,490 kg, and the metal parts of the circle 557 kg. Tideman also gives 12,700 kg as weight. The 9 inch Armstrong gun had been chosen as the standard armor piercing gun for the Dutch navy in the 1860s (cf Heiligerlee-class monitor). The 9-inch Armstrong Gun is not to be confused with the Royal Navy RML 9-inch 12-ton gun. This was a Woolwich gun which had initially been made according to the Armstrong system. It is partly named for weighing 12 English tons, i.e. 12,192 kg.

In 1875-1876 the navy concluded that the 9-inch Armstrong Gun was becoming obsolete. This was at about the same time that most of the Ever gunboats were getting launched. The next group of gunboats, the Wodan class, was therefore enlarged to mount the 28 cm A No. 1 gun. For the existing Ever's this was not possible. In August 1887, works to change the armament to 21 cm breechloading guns started. Havik and Raaf were the first boats to receive the new gun. By 1 July 1890 all ships of the class were armed with: 1 x 21 cm A No. 1 gun; 2 X 3.7 cm gun; 1 x 3.7 cm revolver gun.

The gun of the Hydra was a disappearing gun. The Staunch or the Hydra was the first vessel to use the system invented by Major Alexander Moncrieff on a ship. It meant that after firing the gun retracted, and could be loaded at a lower position. The picture shows that this was indeed something different than just a more backward position. The apparatus on the Hydra was tested on the Rede van Texel in September 1875, with three Russian officers present. After some shots with low charges the first shot with a full powder charge was fired. Immediately one of the water cylinders busted and fell down lower in the ship. It was sheer luck that nobody was hurt. Right after the accident the navy decided to demolish the apparatus and to give the gun a fixed position.

== Ships in the class ==
=== Construction ===
The machines for Dog and Havik were built by Christie, Nolet en De Kuyper in Delfshaven.

Name	Laid down	Launched	Commissioned	Fate	Built by
Ever			Arr. 18 July 1873		Armstrong Newcastle
Hydra			Arr. 30 September 1873	Sold, 6 June 1907	Armstrong Newcastle
Dog	2 April 1874	31 October 1874	16 May 1876		Rijkswerf Amsterdam
Havik	2 April 1874	7 November 1874			Rijkswerf Amsterdam
Gier		23 March 1875	16 May 1876		Koninklijke Fabriek
Raaf		30 April 1875			Koninklijke Fabriek
Geep		17 June 1875			Koninklijke Fabriek
Brak		21 April 1875	16 May 1876		Fijenoord
Lynx		20 May 1875			Fijenoord
Vos		3 June 1875			Fijenoord
Fret		26 February 1876			Koninklijke Fabriek
Das		22 April 1876			Koninklijke Fabriek
Sperwer		27 December 1875			Christie, Nolet en De Kuyper, Delfshaven
Bever		8 February 1876			Christie, Nolet en De Kuyper, Delfshaven
