= Chinese ironclad Tien-sing =

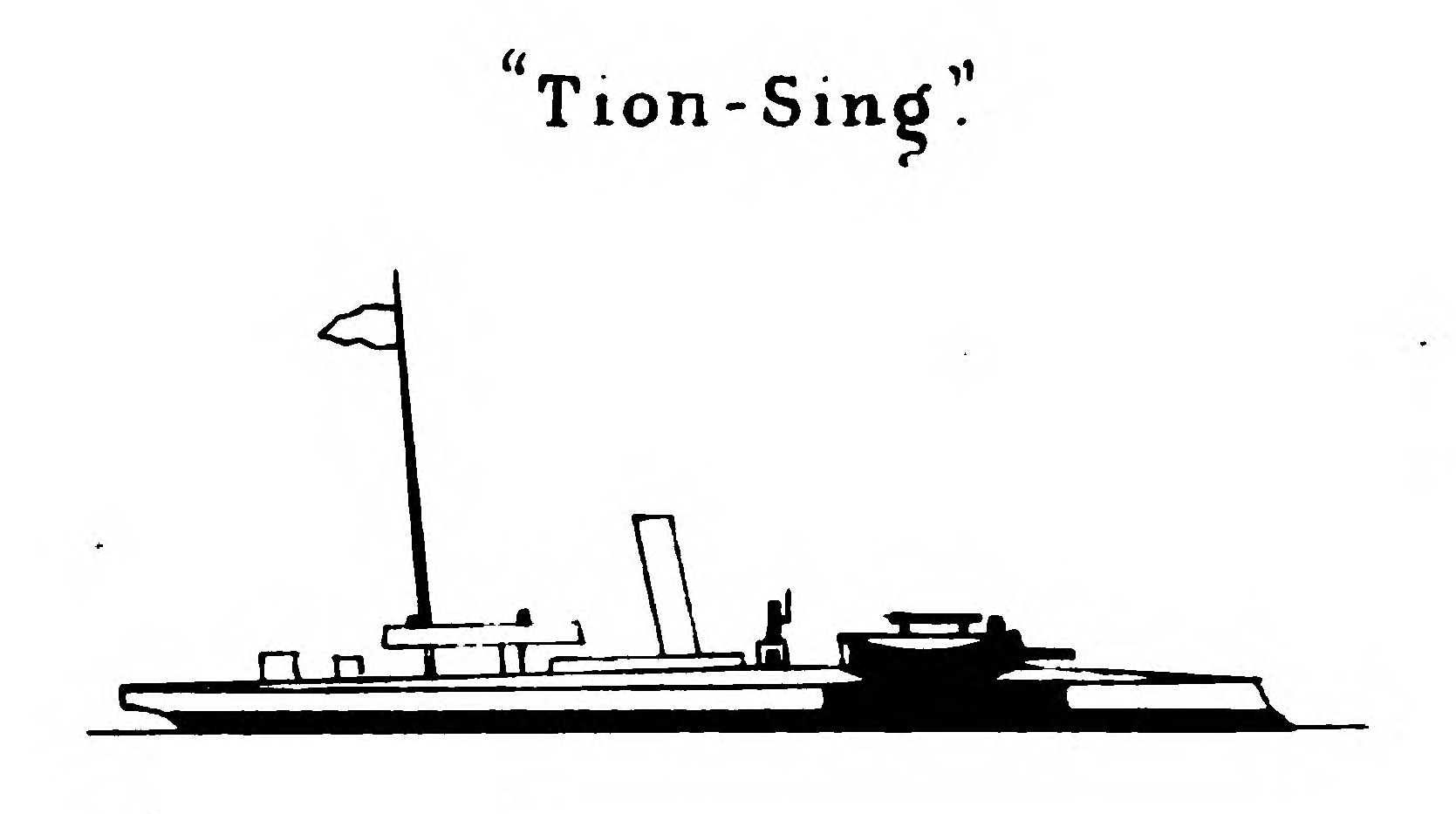
- A line drawing of Tien-Sing from Brassey's Naval Annual 1887

History

Imperial China
- Name: Tien-sing
- Namesake: Tianjin (formerly Tientsin)
- Builder: Kiangnan Arsenal
- Completed: 1875

General characteristics
- Class & type: ironclad flat-iron gunboat
- Displacement: 195 long tons (198 t)
- Length: 104 ft (31.7 m)
- Beam: 20.3 ft (6.2 m)
- Draught: 6.8 ft (2.1 m)
- Installed power: 340 ihp (250 kW)
- Propulsion: Reciprocating engine with twin shafts
- Speed: 10 knots (19 km/h; 12 mph)
- Complement: 40
- Armament: 1x 17cm Krupp gun; Forward mounted naval ram
- Armour: Deck: iron 2.625–2.375 inches (6.67–6.03 cm), teak 4.75 inches (12.1 cm); Sides: iron 2.375–1.875 inches (6.03–4.76 cm), teak 4.75 inches (12.1 cm)

Tien-sing or Tiong Sing, originally named Chin-ou (金甌) and sometimes referred to as Jinou, was an ironclad flat-iron gunboat built for the Imperial Chinese Navy. She was completed in 1875 at the Kiangnan Arsenal, the first time an ironclad had been constructed in China. She was built out of spare components, prior to the construction of a purpose built yard for ironclads. Tien-sing was modified part way through construction to allow it to undertake a sea voyage to Hai River, but instead was only ever used on the Yangtze and Huangpu Rivers. She was still in operation in 1902, having survived the Sino-French War and the First Sino-Japanese War.

== Design ==
Tien-sing was the only ship of its type constructed, which was built out of spare iron and an extra 17 cm Krupp gun at the Kiangnan Arsenal. It had been intended for ironclads to be built there, and Tien-sing was constructed while the ironclad building yard was also under construction. This made her the first home built ironclad in Chinese service, with the vessel known locally as "The Terror of the Western World". Her design was later compared to that of HMS Staunch of the Royal Navy, but with additional protection for the Krupp gun. Originally named Chin-ou, she was 104 feet (32 m) long overall, had a beam of 20.3 feet (6.2 m) and an average draft of 6.8 feet (2.1 m). She displaced 195 long tons (198 t). The propulsion system consisted of a 340 ihp (250 kW) reciprocating engine with twin shafts. Her engines produced a cruising speed of 10 knots (19 km/h; 12 mph). She had a total crew complement of 40.

The Krupp gun was on a retractable mount which meant it could be moved into the hull of the ironclad. This was the only armament, other than the forward mounted naval ram which was used to offset the weight of the engine. She was covered in iron deck plating 2.625 inches (6.67 cm) thick, tapered to 2.375 inches (6.03 cm) with teak backing 4.75 inches (12.1 cm) thick. On the sides, the iron plating was 2.375 inches (6.03 cm) thick, tapered to 1.875 inches (4.76 cm) with the same thickness of teak backing. This initial design was to enable her to act as a river-based ironclad, primarily near the mouth of the Huangpu River, and occasionally on the Yangtze. However, Li Hongzhang felt that she should instead be used to defend the Hai River, which would require her to undertake a sea voyage to get there. Changes were then made to the design to improve her buoyancy.

== Career ==
She was completed in 1875, and had been due to be launched in September of that year. After becoming stuck on the slipway, she was launched at a later date. She was never sent to the Hai River, instead being used as she was originally intended. She was still in operation as of 1888, following the Sino-French War. By 1902, she formed part of the south squadron based out of Fuzhou and Canton, having survived the First Sino-Japanese War, during which time the ships of the northern fleet in the Hai River had been either destroyed or captured. (Note: Conway's All the World's Fighting Ships 1860-1905 lists Tien-sing's fate as having been captured by Japanese forces at the Battle of Weihaiwei, and renamed Hei Yuen. However, the Hei Yuen was the name given to the Chinese gunboat Pingyuan in Japanese service after the battle.)
