= Wodan-class gunboat =

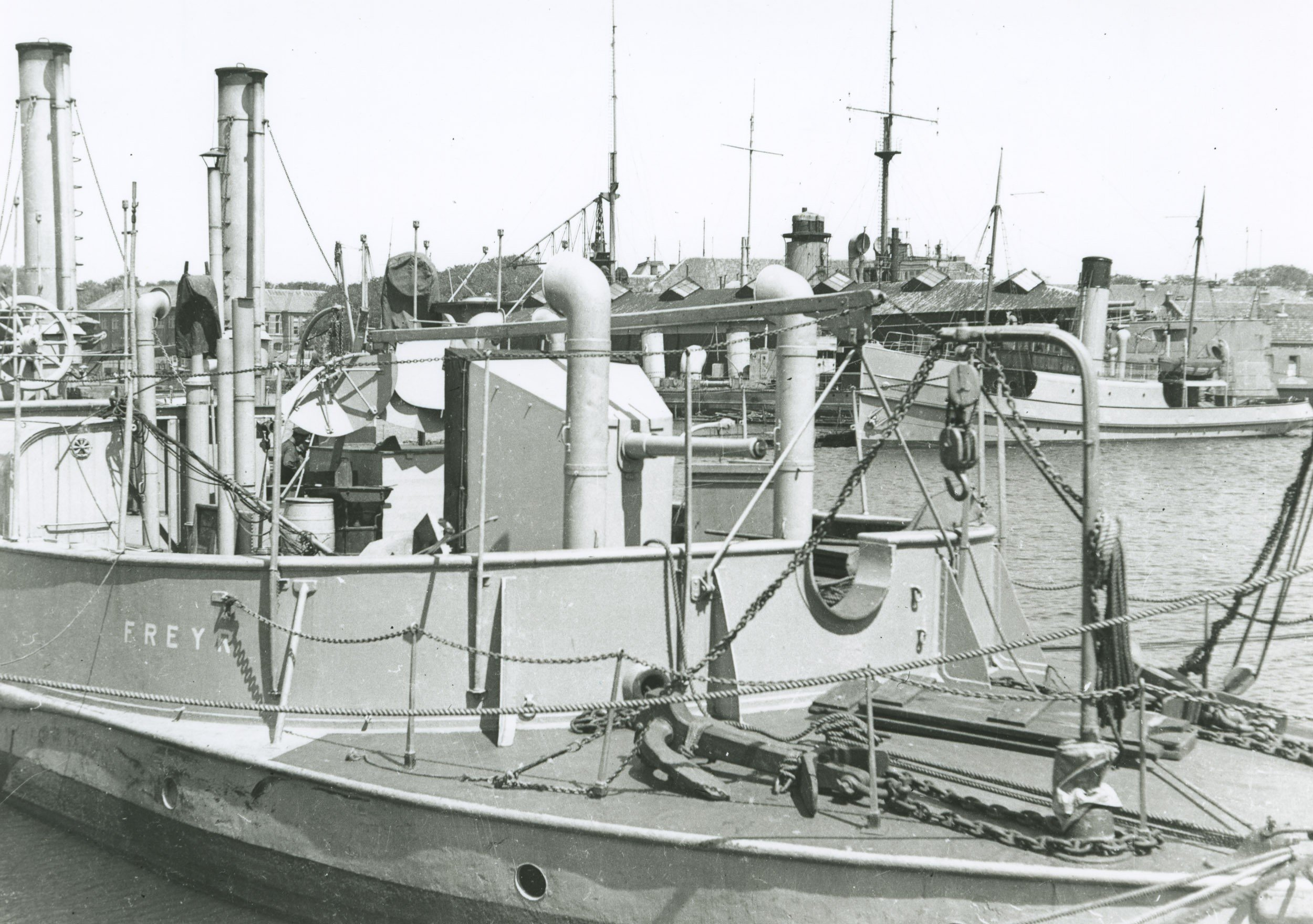
- Freyr in 1938 with 7.5 cm gun and showing the opening for the 28 cm gun

Class overview
- Name: Wodan class
- Builders: multiple
- Operators: Royal Netherlands Navy
- Preceded by: Ever class
- Cost: 213,700 guilders
- In commission: 1877-1940
- Completed: 16
- Scrapped: 16

General characteristics
- Type: Gunboat
- Displacement: 245 tons
- Length: 26.64 m (87 ft 5 in)
- Beam: 8.20 m (26 ft 11 in)
- Draught: 2.22 m (7 ft 3 in)
- Depth of hold: 2.87 m (9 ft 5 in)
- Installed power: 30 nhp; 101–171 ihp (75–128 kW)
- Speed: 7–8.3 kn (13.0–15.4 km/h; 8.1–9.6 mph) (trials)
- Complement: 22
- Armament: 1 x 28 cm A No. 1 gun, later; 1 x 28 cm A No. 2 gun (not for all)
- Armour: none

The Wodan class (often referred to as the Thor class) was a class of 16 flat-iron gunboats of the Royal Netherlands Navy built in the 1870s.

== Context ==
In the Age of Sail, and in general before the end of World War II, gunboats were slow, weakly armored, and did not have the set of powerful weapons that main surface combatants had. For defending gunboats, like the Dutch ones were, this put a minimum requirement on the range of their guns. These weapons had to match the range of the weapons of the opponents that could appear in the area. Otherwise, opposing main fleet units could simply destroy the defending gunboats from a safe range, before attacking the shore.

The Dutch started to construct an armored fleet in 1865. They then opted to use the 23 cm Armstrong rifled muzzle loading gun as its main weapon. It was thought to be the minimum size for a gun that would be able to penetrate the armor of most opponents. In turn this minimum size would allow the Dutch ships to easily retain the shallow draught that was necessary in their home waters.

In about 1875, the Dutch government concluded that the 23 cm Armstrong RML could no longer match the main guns of the fleets of their possible opponents. The Dutch started to look for a replacement, and found the 28 cm A No. 1 gun. This was a Krupp Breechloader of 28 cm and 22 calibers long. It was by all means superior to the 23 cm Armstrong RML. The Dutch government then decided that the 28 cm A No. 1 gun would become the standard heavy weapon of the Dutch fleet in the home waters.

== New gunboats ==
=== Preceding Ever class ===
In 1873 the first two gunboats of the Ever class. HNLMS Ever and HNLMS Hydra had been commissioned. The Ever class had been modeled entirely on mounting the 23 cm Armstrong RML. As a consequence many ships of the Ever class were commissioned while they were already obsolete.

=== Design of the Wodan class ===
The Dutch authorities had been very satisfied with the preceding Ever class. When they realized that the days of the 23 cm RML were over, they therefore decided to make a new series of gunboats modelled on mounting the 28 cm A No. 1 gun. This decision was taken in a departmental order of 19 July 1876.

== Characteristics ==
=== General ===
The Ever class had been modeled on the British gunboat Staunch. The requirement to mount the 28 cm A No. 1 gun instead of the 23 cm RML, led to only a slight enlargement of the Ever design. I.e. from 196 ton displacement to 245 tons, that is only 25% larger. (cf. the difference in weight of 12,700 kg, 28,000 lb for the 23 cm RML and 27,650 kg, 60,960 lb for the 28 cm gun, as well the difference in carriage weight).

=== Propulsion ===
Each ship of the Wodan class had two compound engines with vertical cylinders. There were two boilers that each had its own fire. The nominal power of each boiler was 15 hp. There were two screws, a requirement for good maneuverability in small spaces. After the first boats: Wodan, Thor, Freijr, Njord, Tyr, and Braga had been delivered, experiments with the propeller took place. The Tideman model propeller gave the highest speed of 7.5 knots (13.9 km/h; 8.6 mph), and was therefore adapted.

The problem of simply enlarging the Ever design to mount a bigger gun, was in the machinery. Except for a small change in cylinder diameter, this remained the same. The designed trial speed of Wodan versus Ever was 7.55 knots (13.98 km/h; 8.69 mph) vs. 7.9 knots (14.6 km/h; 9.1 mph), only 0.35 knots (0.65 km/h; 0.40 mph) slower. A subsequent overview of the speed of both classes, shows that the Wodan class was indeed only 0.4 knots (0.74 km/h; 0.46 mph) slower during trials.

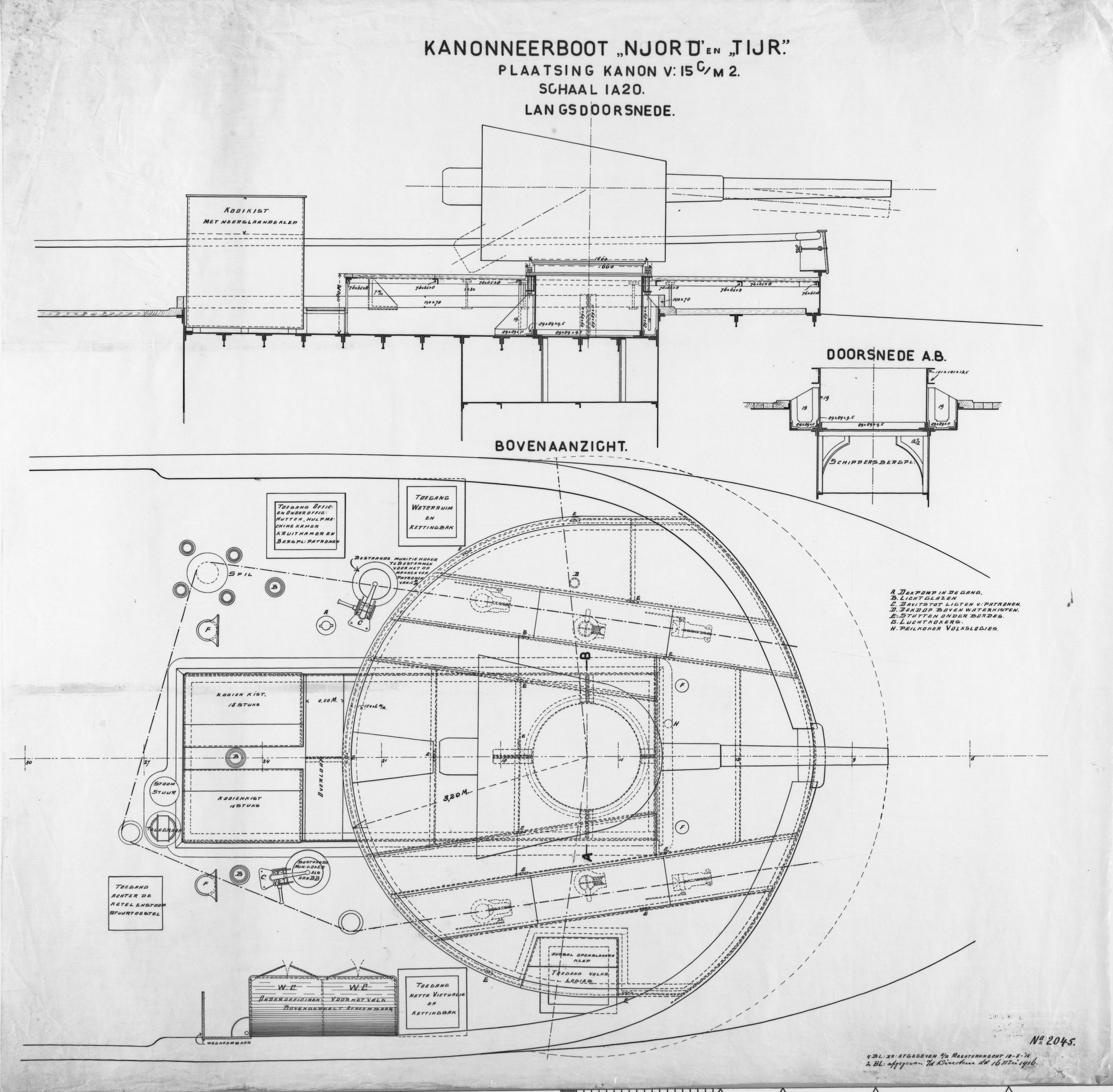
15 cm No. 2 gun on Njord

=== Armament ===
The Wodan class was originally armed with the 28 cm A No. 1 gun. This was a L/22 gun, meaning its length was 22 times its caliber of 279 mm. As shown above, the selection of the 28 cm L/22 gun was the reason to design the Wodan class. The 28 cm L/2 gun weighed 27,500 kg (60,600 lb). Its carriage and sled amounted to 11,000 kg (24,000 lb).

Many boats of the Wodan class would later lose their 28 cm A No. 1 gun. It would be replaced by the even heavier 28 cm A No. 2 gun of 30 calibers (L/30). In 1882–1883, the monitors Bloedhond and Wesp exchanged their twin guns 23 cm guns for a single 28 cm A No. 1 gun taken from Wodan-class gunboats. Instead these Wodans received new L/30 guns. The ships of the class lost their heavy 28 cm gun when it became obsolete. By the end of World War I all boats had been re-armed with guns ranging from 3.7 cm guns to the 15 cm No. 2 (Njord)..

== Ships in the class ==
=== Construction ===
Name	Laid down	Launched	Commissioned	Fate	Built by
Wodan	1876	15 February 1877			Christie, Nolet en De Kuyper, Delfshaven
Thor	1876	31 March 1877			Christie, Nolet en De Kuyper, Delfshaven
Freyr	1876	1877			Christie, Nolet en De Kuyper, Delfshaven
Njord	1877	1878			Christie, Nolet en De Kuyper, Delfshaven
Tyr	1877	1878			Christie, Nolet en De Kuyper, Delfshaven
Braga	1877	1878			Christie, Nolet en De Kuyper, Delfshaven
Heimdall	1878	1878			Christie, Nolet en De Kuyper, Delfshaven
Balder	1878	1878			Christie, Nolet en De Kuyper, Delfshaven
Vidar	1878	1879			Fijenoord
Vali	1878	1879			Fijenoord
Ulfr	1878	1879			Koninklijke Fabriek van Stoom- en andere Werktuigen
Dufa	1879	1879			Koninklijke Fabriek van Stoom- en andere Werktuigen
Hadda	1879	1879			Koninklijke Fabriek van Stoom- en andere Werktuigen
Hefring	1879	1879			Fijenoord
Udur	1879	1879			Rijkswerf (Amsterdam)
Bulgia	1879	1879			Rijkswerf Amsterdam
