= Castore-class gunboat =

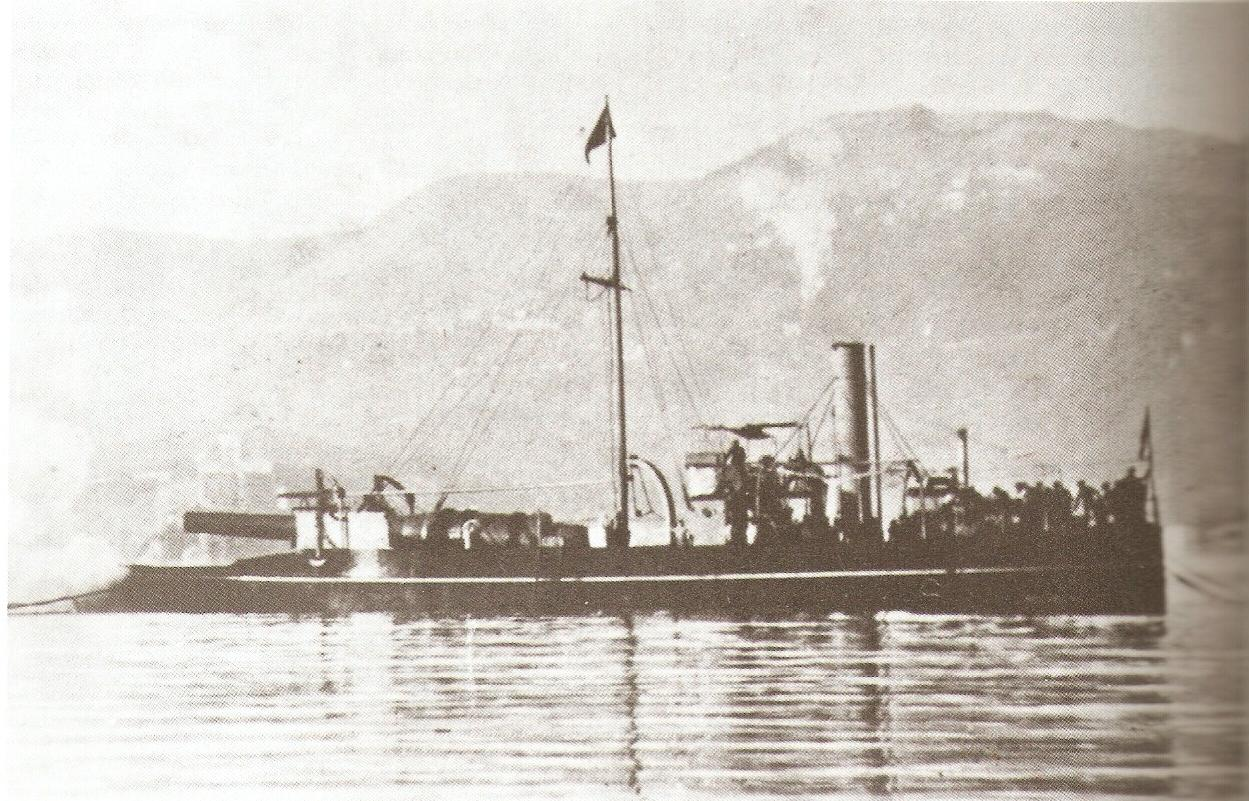
- Polluce conducting weapons trials.

History

Italy
- Name: Castore and Polluce
- Namesake: Castor and Pollux

Class overview
- Builders: Armstrong Whitworth, Elswick
- Operators: Regia Marina
- Built: 1887–1889
- In commission: 1889–1925
- Completed: 2
- Retired: 2
- Scrapped: 2

General characteristics
- Type: Rendel (or "flat-iron") gunboat
- Displacement: 667 long tons (678 t)
- Length: 115 ft (35.1 m)
- Beam: 37 ft (11.3 m)
- Draft: 9 ft 2 in (2.8 m)
- Installed power: 350 ihp (261 kW)
- Propulsion: 2 shafts, vertical triple expansion steam engines
- Speed: 8 knots (15 km/h; 9.2 mph)
- Complement: 42
- Armament: 1 × 1 - 40 cm (16 in)/32 guns
- Notes: Fuel load, 20–70 long tons (20–71 t) coal

The Italian Castore-class gunboats, Castore and Polluce, were a class of two Rendel gunboats, designed and built by Sir W G Armstrong Mitchell & Co.'s Elswick Works in the late 1880s to a contract by the Italian War Ministry. Designed by Philip Watts and Herbert Rowell, and constructed in Elswick's Tyneside yard in the United Kingdom, the two gunboats were disassembled and shipped to Italy for reassembly in the Armstrong facility at Pozzuoli, proving to be the only ships constructed there after the Italian government cancelled the shipyard project. It is uncertain whether the vessels were designed as testbeds for heavy guns, or were intended from the outset as operational gunboats.

== Design ==
Both vessels were laid down in the Elswick yard on 22 February 1887. Built to a design calling for a length of 115 feet (35 m) and a beam of 37 feet (11 m), giving them a length to beam ratio of 3.1:1, they displaced 667 long tons (678 t) under normal conditions, and were powered by two steam engines, driving a pair of propellers that gave a speed of around 8 knots (15 km/h).

As constructed, both vessels were armed with a single, massive Krupp 40-centimetre (16-inch), 32-caliber cannon mounted on the stern, that could be elevated to an angle of 13 degrees, firing a 1,980-pound (900 kg) shell.

== Castore ==
Castore was launched in September 1888, and conducted her trials in 1889 at Pozzuoli. She had her heavy gun removed in 1889, and was commissioned into the Italian Navy on 18 July 1891 as a gunboat. Rearmed with a single 12-centimetre (4.7-inch) gun, she served until 1899 when she was disarmed and reclassified as a barge. In 1904, she was reclassified again as a minelayer, and served in that role until late 1915 when she was designated as a torpedo testing craft. After serving in this role throughout the First World War, she was stricken and discarded on 8 October 1925.

== Polluce ==
Polluce was launched in October 1888, and conducted her trials in 1889 at Pozzuoli. She was commissioned into the Italian Navy on 18 July 1891 along with her sister vessel, but retained her heavy gun until 1899, when she was rearmed with a single 12 cm (4.7 in) gun. She saw no action in her time serving the Regia Marina, and in 1911, she was stricken and discarded.
