= HMS Gannet (1927) =

Gunboat of the Royal Navy

History

United Kingdom
- Name: Gannet
- Builder: Yarrow Shipbuilders
- Launched: 10 November 1927
- Commissioned: January 1928
- Decommissioned: March 1942
- Fate: Given to the Nationalist Chinese Navy in March 1942

Nationalist China
- Name: Ying Shan (英山)
- Acquired: March 1942
- Commissioned: March 1942
- Decommissioned: 30 November 1949
- Captured: 30 November 1949
- Fate: Defected to Communist China

Communist China
- Name: Nu River
- Namesake: Nu River
- Acquired: 30 November 1949
- Commissioned: 30 November 1949
- Decommissioned: 1975
- Fate: Retired in 1970s

General characteristics
- Type: River gunboat
- Displacement: 310 tons
- Length: 184 ft (56 m)
- Beam: 29 ft (8.8 m)
- Draught: 3.2 ft (0.98 m)
- Propulsion: Four Parsons Marine Steam Turbine Company geared steam turbines; Two 3-drum Yarrow boilers; 2,250 shp (1,680 kW)
- Speed: 16 knots (30 km/h; 18 mph)
- Complement: 55
- Armament: 2 × 3 in (76 mm) guns; 8 × machine guns

HMS Gannet was a river gunboat of the Royal Navy built by Yarrow Shipbuilders in 1927 for Yangtze Patrol. Gannet was the sister ship of HMS Peterel.

Originally functioning in the area of Hong Kong, Gannet was damaged by Japanese aircraft and went to the Chinese wartime capital Chongqing for repairs. The gunboat and its sister ship Peterel were chosen by the British to be presents for China, and the transfers were made in February 1942. The following month, both gunboats officially joined the Republic of China Navy (ROCN) and Gannet was renamed as Ying Shan (英山, literal translation = British Mountain).

The gunboat served with the ROCN until 30 November 1949, when the ROCN Riverine Flotilla commander defected to the advancing communist force that blocked the Yangtze River, taking seven boats to the communist side, including Ying Shan. After joining the People's Liberation Army Navy (PLAN), the gunboat was once again renamed Nu River.

She served until being retired in 1975.

== Publications ==
- Colledge, J. J.; Warlow, Ben (2006) [1969]. Ships of the Royal Navy: The Complete Record of All Fighting Ships of the Royal Navy from the 15th Century to the Present (3rd Rev ed.). London: Chatham Publishing. ISBN 978-1-86176-281-8. OCLC 67375475.
