= HNoMS Æger (1894) =

History

Norway
- Name: Æger
- Namesake: Ægir – the Jötunn king of the sea in Norse mythology
- Builder: Karljohansvern Naval Yard, Horten
- Launched: 17 May 1894
- Commissioned: 1894
- Decommissioned: 1932

General characteristics
- Type: Rendel gunboat
- Displacement: 413 long tons (420 t) or 420 long tons (427 t) [sources disagree]
- Length: 33.22 m (109.0 ft)
- Draught: 2.36 m (7 ft 9 in)
- Propulsion: 350 hp (260 kW) engine
- Speed: 9.8 knots (11.3 mph; 18.1 km/h)
- Complement: 43
- Armament: 1 × 21 cm (8.3 in) gun; 1 × 10-pdr 7.11 cm (2.8 in) QF gun; 2 × 4-pdr 5 cm (2.0 in) QF guns
- Armour: Deck: 38 mm (1.5 in)

HNoMS Æger was a Rendel gunboat built for the Royal Norwegian Navy at Karljohansvern Naval Yard in 1894, as the last of the 2. class gunboats. Larger than the other, older 2. class gunboats, Æger had a 38 mm (1.5 inch) armoured deck.

She was known as Padda ("The Toad") due to the way she looked, and was kept in the fleet until she was decommissioned in 1932.
