= Skorpo, Bjørnafjorden =

Island in Vestland, Norway

Skorpo
- Interactive map of the island

Geography
- Location: Vestland, Norway
- Coordinates: 60.1714°N 5.3085°E
- Area: 0.9 km^{2} (0.35 sq mi)
- Length: 1.6 km (0.99 mi)
- Width: 1.0 km (0.62 mi)
- Highest elevation: 66 m (217 ft)

Administration
- Norway
- County: Vestland
- Municipality: Bjørnafjorden Municipality

Demographics
- Population: 0

Skorpo is an uninhabited island in Bjørnafjorden Municipality in Vestland county, Norway. The 0.9-square-kilometre (0.35 sq mi) island lies along the Korsfjorden, about 25 kilometres (16 mi) south of the city of Bergen. The island lies just off the mainland west of the village of Hagavik. The island of Strøno lies just southeast of Skorpo.

The only access to the island is by private boats. There are no permanent residents on the island, but there are a number of homes on the island that are used as holiday/vacation homes.

== See also ==
- List of islands of Norway
