= HMS Arrow (1871) =

Ant-class gunboat

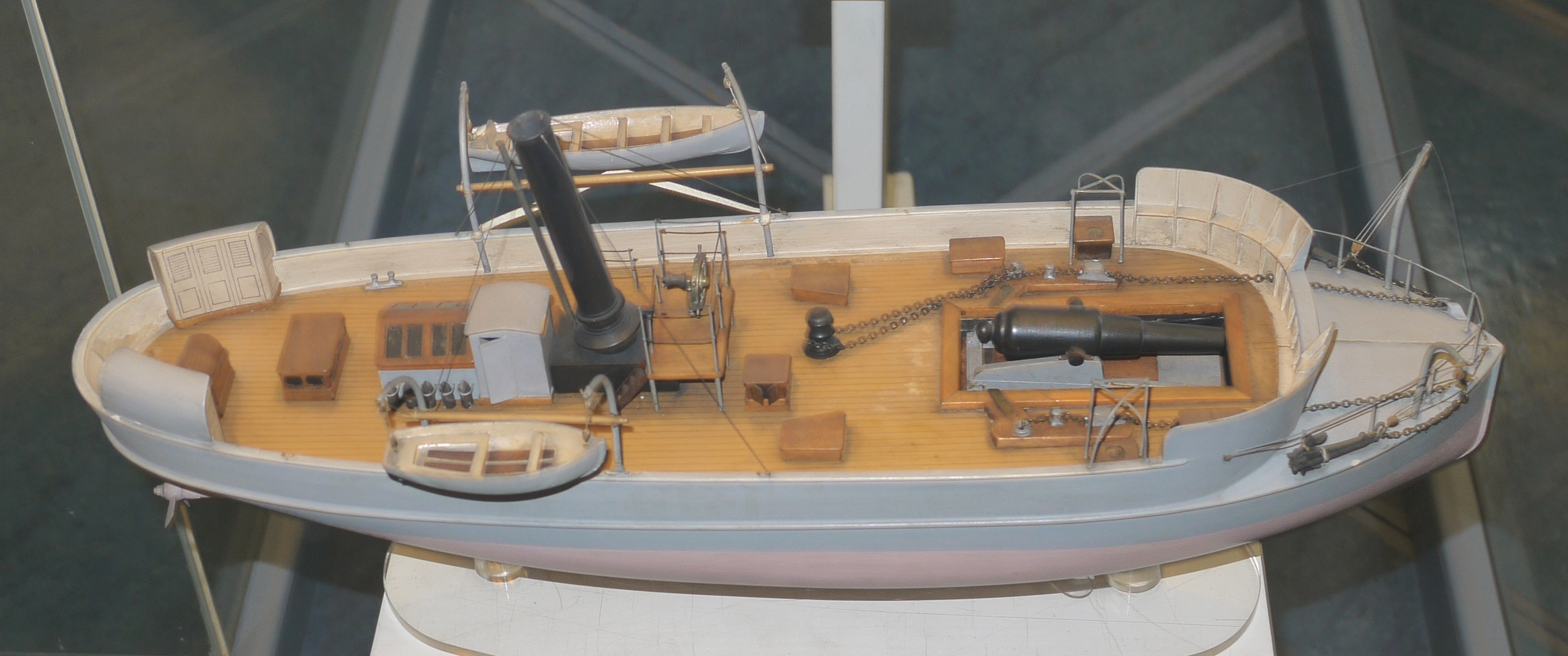
- Model of HMS Arrow

History

United Kingdom
- Name: HMS Arrow
- Namesake: Arrow
- Builder: J. and G. Rennie
- Launched: 22 April 1871
- Stricken: 1922
- Fate: Unknown, 1922

General characteristics (as built)
- Type: Ant-class gunboat
- Displacement: 241 tons
- Length: 85 feet
- Crew: 31
- Armament: 1x 10-inch muzzle loading gun

HMS Arrow was an Ant-class gunboat of the Royal Navy. She was built at Greenwich by J. and G. Rennie and launched on 22 April 1871. Arrow was decommissioned in 1922.

== Design and description ==
Arrow measured 85 feet long and was armed with an 18 ton 10-inch muzzle loading gun. She had a displacement of 241 tons and a length of 85 feet, and a crew of 31 men. She was built alongside her sister ship HMS Bonetta.

== Service ==
In September 1873, Arrow was attached to the Royal Naval College, Greenwich for gunnery practice.
