= HMS Trent (1877) =

Gunboat of the Royal Navy

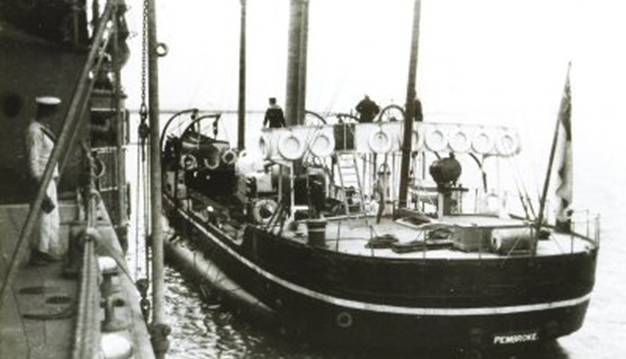
- Pembroke (ex-Trent) sometime after 1905

History

United Kingdom
- Name: HMS Trent
- Namesake: River Trent
- Builder: Palmers Shipbuilding & Iron Co, Jarrow
- Yard number: 345
- Launched: 23 August 1877
- Renamed: Pembroke in September 1905; Gannet in June 1917
- Fate: Sold to the Dover Shipbreaking Company on 21 February 1923

General characteristics
- Class & type: Medina-class iron screw gunboat
- Displacement: 386 tons (designed); 363 tons (actual)
- Length: 110 ft 0 in (33.5 m)
- Beam: 34 ft 1 in (10.4 m)
- Draught: 9 ft 6 in (2.9 m)
- Depth of hold: 5 ft 6 in (1.7 m)
- Installed power: 60 nominal horsepower; 310 ihp (230 kW)
- Propulsion: 2 × 2-cylinder horizontal single-expansion steam engines; Twin screws
- Sail plan: Barquentine; (2 pole masts from 1892)
- Speed: 9 1/2 kn (17.6 km/h)
- Complement: 51
- Armament: As built: 3 × 6.3-inch (160-mm) 64-pdr muzzle-loading rifles; From 1892: 2 × 4.7-inch quick-firing guns

HMS Trent was a Medina-class gunboat launched in 1877. She was the fifth ship of the Royal Navy to be named after the River Trent. She was renamed HMS Pembroke in 1905, and served off the coast of Tanganyika in 1915. She was renamed HMS Gannet in 1917 while serving as a diving tender. She was scrapped in 1923.

== Design ==
The Medina class were a development of the Rendel (or "flat-iron") gunboat, a series of small vessels with low freeboards which mounted a small number of relatively large guns. Although the Medinas were exceptionally provided with masts to extend their range and independence, in essence they were available for similar operations to their un-masted sisters; offensive action against shore defences. Their ungainly appearance led them to be described by the naval historian Antony Preston as "the most grotesque craft ever seen". All 12 vessels of the class were named after rivers. They were constructed entirely of iron and were fitted with an unusual bow rudder.

=== Armament ===
As built, ships of the class mounted three 6.3-inch (160-mm) 64-pdr 64-cwt muzzle-loading rifles. By 1892 Trent had been fitted with a pair of 4.7-inch quick-firing guns.

=== Propulsion ===
All the ships of the class were fitted with a pair of R and W Hawthorn 2-cylinder horizontal single-expansion steam engines of 60 nominal horsepower. They developed 310 indicated horsepower (230 kW), giving a speed of about 9 1/2 kn (17.6 km/h).

=== Sail plan ===
All ships of the class were built with three masts and a barquentine rig of sails. Trent had her rig reduced to a pair of pole masts in 1892.

== Construction ==
Trent was launched from the Jarrow yard of Palmers Shipbuilding and Iron Company on 23 August 1877.

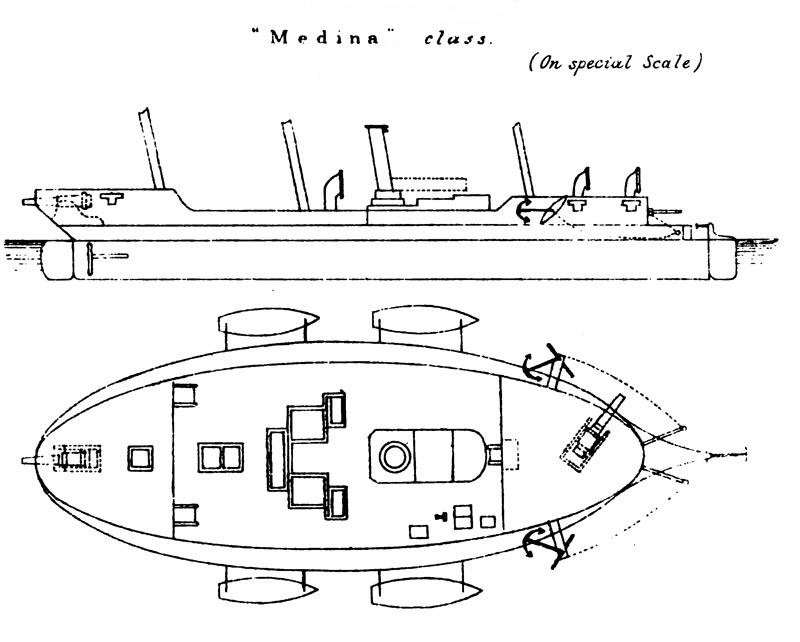
The deck plan of a Medina-class gunboat from Brassey's Naval Annual

== Operational career ==
HMS Trent served as gunnery tender to HMS Wildfire, flagship at Sheerness, and was paid off into the Medway fleet reserve in June 1901. She was re-commissioned at Chatham 21 December 1901 by Boatswain A. S. Robinson for service in the river Medway.

On 11 September 1907 Pembroke, based at Chatham as a depot ship, was rammed by the collier Walton, requiring Pembroke to be docked for repair.

== Fate ==
The Medina-class gunboat HMS Spey

Trent was sold for breaking to the Dover Shipbreaking Company on 21 February 1923.
