= Ant-class gunboat =

Class of Royal Navy gunboat

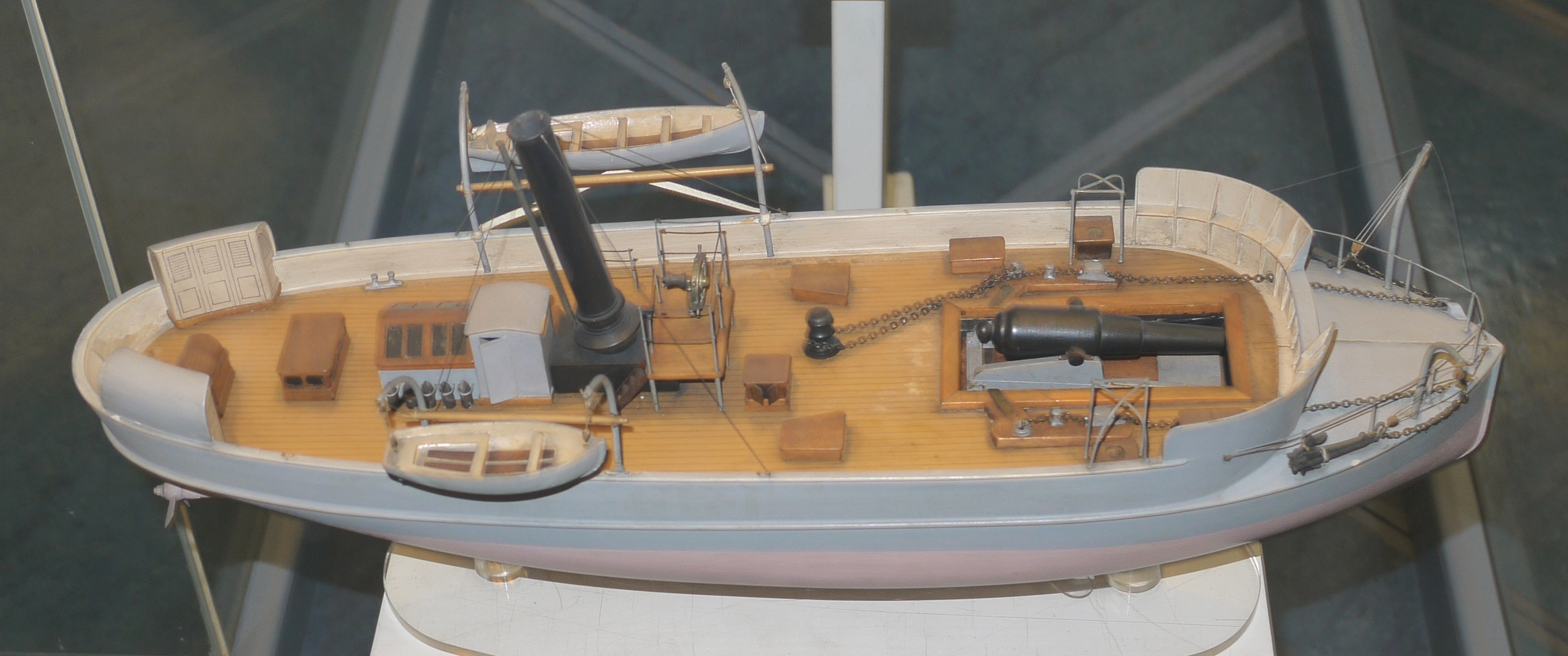
- A model of HMS Arrow

Class overview
- Name: Ant class
- Builders: Portsmouth Dockyard; Robert Napier & Sons; Chatham Dockyard; Charles Mitchell & Co.; J. and G. Rennie, Greenwich; Campbell Johnston, North Woolwich; Laird Brothers, Birkenhead; Pembroke Dockyard
- Operators: Royal Navy
- Preceded by: HMS Plucky
- Succeeded by: Medina class
- Subclasses: Gadfly class
- Built: 1870 - 1879
- In commission: 1870 - 1959
- Completed: 24

General characteristics
- Type: Flat-iron gunboat
- Displacement: 254 tons standard
- Length: 85 ft (26 m)
- Beam: 26 ft 1.5 in (7.963 m)
- Draught: 6 ft (1.8 m)
- Installed power: 260 ihp (190 kW)
- Propulsion: Two 2-cylinder horizontal single-expansion steam engines; Two screws
- Speed: 8.5 kn (15.7 km/h)
- Crew: 30
- Armament: One 10-inch (18 ton) muzzle-loading rifle

The Ant-class gunboat was a class of twenty-four Royal Navy flat-iron gunboats mounting a single 10-inch gun, built between 1870 and 1880. They carried no masts or sails, being among the first Royal Navy vessels not to do so. The last four vessels were ordered separately and are sometimes known as the Gadfly class, although they were essentially identical. Members of the class lingered on as steam lighters, dredgers, boom defence vessels and base ships, lasting in some cases into the 1950s.

== Design ==
The flat-iron gunboats were designed for coastal defence and bombardment, and were constructed from iron. They were not rigged, and the single 10-inch (18 ton) muzzle-loading rifle was fitted forward on a hydraulic mount that allowed it to be lowered for a sea passage to improve the vessel's seaworthiness, and raised for action. Power was provided by a pair of two-cylinder horizontal single-expansion steam engines driving twin screws. Together they developed 260 indicated horsepower (190 kW), giving a top speed of about 8.5 knots (15.7 km/h).

== Ships ==
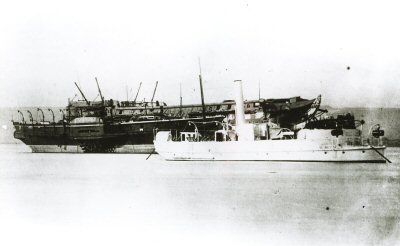
Mastiff (foreground, in white)

Name	Ship Builder	Launched	Fate
Blazer	Portsmouth Dockyard	7 December 1870	Became seagoing tender for weapons testing in 1904. Gunboat August 1914. Sold to W Loveridge, West Hartlepool 19 August 1919.
Comet	Portsmouth Dockyard	8 December 1870	Sold to J Pas on 12 May 1908 and broken up in the Netherlands
Bustard	Robert Napier & Sons, Govan	7 January 1871	Sold to Thos. W. Ward, Milford Haven March 1923
Kite	Robert Napier & Sons, Govan	8 February 1871	Sold in a partially dismantled state to Hughes Bolckow on 18 May 1920 and converted to a dredger
Scourge	Chatham Dockyard	25 March 1871	Converted to tank vessel, renamed C79 in 1903-4 and still listed as in service in 1930
Snake	Chatham Dockyard	25 March 1871	Completed as a cable lighter, renamed YC15 on 23 September 1907
Mastiff	Charles Mitchell & Co., Walker	4 April 1871	Renamed Snapper in 1914, sold to Thames Shipbreakers Ltd on 28 November 1931
Bloodhound	Charles Mitchell & Co., Walker	22 April 1871	Boom defence vessel in 1917, sold to F Bevis Ltd on 28 June 1921
Arrow	J. and G. Rennie, Greenwich	22 April 1871	Sold to W H Webber on 1 March 1922
Bonetta	J & G Rennie, Greenwich	20 May 1871	Sold on 12 January 1909 as salvage vessel Disperser and lost in April 1940
Badger	Chatham Dockyard	13 March 1872	Sold to W Loveridge, West Hartlepool on 6 October 1908
Fidget	Chatham Dockyard	13 March 1872	Hulked or sold in 1905
Bulldog	Campbell Johnston, North Woolwich	17 September 1872	Sold to R Gillham on 16 July 1906
Pike	Campbell Johnston, North Woolwich	16 October 1872	Boom defence vessel at Southampton in 1908, sold to G Sharpe on 27 March 1920
Pickle	Campbell Johnston, North Woolwich	15 November 1872	Dockyard lighter in 1906
Snap	Campbell Johnston, North Woolwich	11 December 1872	Sold at Chatham to Deaker, Hull in 1909
Ant	Laird Brothers, Birkenhead	14 August 1873	Boom defence vessel 1917, used as a target in 1921, sold to Granton Shipbreaking Company for breaking up on 2 June 1926
Cuckoo	Laird Brothers, Birkenhead	14 August 1873	Became base ship, renamed Vivid on 19 February 1912, Vivid II in January 1922, YC37 in 1923 and finally sold to Hocking, Plymouth in 1959
Hyaena	Laird Brothers, Birkenhead	30 August 1873	Sold at Chatham to Adrienne Merveille of Dunkirk on 3 April 1906
Weazel	Laird Brothers, Birkenhead	4 September 1873	Became oil fuel lighter C118 in 1904
Gadfly	Pembroke Dock	5 May 1879	Converted to a coal lighter at Simonstown, completing on 18 May 1900 and then renamed YC230. Sold at the Cape in 1918
Pincher	Pembroke Dock	5 May 1879	Sold at Portsmouth on 11 June 1905
Griper	Pembroke Dock	15 September 1879	Became steam lighter YC373 in 1905, renamed Flora on 19 June 1923 as base ship, then Afrikander in 1933. Believed to have been broken up at the Cape in 1951
Tickler	Pembroke Dock	15 September 1879	Converted to steam lighter at Simonstown in 1902, renamed Afrikander as base ship on 26 February 1919, then Afrikander II in 1933. Broken up at Simonstown in 1937
