= Medina-class gunboat =

1877 class of British gunboats

- Spey

Class overview
- Name: Medina class
- Builders: Palmers Shipbuilding and Iron Company, Jarrow
- Operators: Royal Navy
- Preceded by: Ant class
- Succeeded by: Bouncer class
- Built: 1876–1877
- In commission: 1877–1923
- Completed: 12

General characteristics
- Type: Iron screw gunboat
- Displacement: 386 tons (designed); 363 tons (actual)
- Length: 110 ft 0 in (33.5 m)
- Beam: 34 ft 1 in (10.4 m)
- Draught: 9 ft 6 in (2.9 m)
- Depth of hold: 5 ft 6 in (1.7 m)
- Installed power: 60 nominal horsepower; 310 ihp (230 kW)
- Propulsion: 2 × 2-cylinder horizontal single-expansion steam engines; Twin screws
- Sail plan: Barquentine; (2 pole masts from 1892)
- Speed: 9 1/2 kn (17.6 km/h)
- Complement: 51
- Armament: As built: 3 × 6.3-inch (160-mm) 64-pdr muzzle-loading rifles; Later: 2 (or 3) x 4.7-inch quick-firing guns

The Medina-class gunboat was a class of 12 Royal Navy Rendel (or "flat-iron") gunboats mounting three 6.3-inch guns, built between 1876 and 1877. Flat-iron gunboats were normally built without masts or rigging, but the Medinas carried a full barquentine rig. Their robust iron hulls meant that they lingered on as diving tenders, barges and lighters, with five of them working into the 1920s. The hull of Medway lies in shallow water in Bermuda and is visible on satellite imagery.

== Design ==
The Medina class were a development of the Rendel (or "flat-iron") gunboat, a series of small vessels with low freeboards that mounted a small number of relatively large guns. Although the Medinas were exceptionally provided with masts to extend their range and independence, in essence they were available for similar operations to their un-masted sisters; offensive action against shore defences. Their ungainly appearance led them to be described by the naval historian Antony Preston as "the most grotesque craft ever seen". All 12 vessels of the class were built at Palmers Shipbuilding and Iron Company in Jarrow and were named after rivers. They were constructed entirely of iron and were fitted with an unusual bow rudder.

=== Armament ===
As built, ships of the class mounted three 6.3-inch (160-mm) 64-pdr 64-cwt muzzle-loading rifles. By 1892 Trent had been fitted with a pair of 4.7-inch quick-firing guns.

=== Propulsion ===
All the ships of the class were fitted with a pair of R and W Hawthorn 2-cylinder horizontal single-expansion steam engines of 60 nominal horsepower. They developed 310 indicated horsepower (230 kW), giving a speed of about 9 1/2 kn (17.6 km/h).

=== Sail plan ===
All ships of the class were built with three masts and a barquentine rig of sails. Surviving members of the class had their sailing rig replaced by a pair of pole masts in the 1890s.

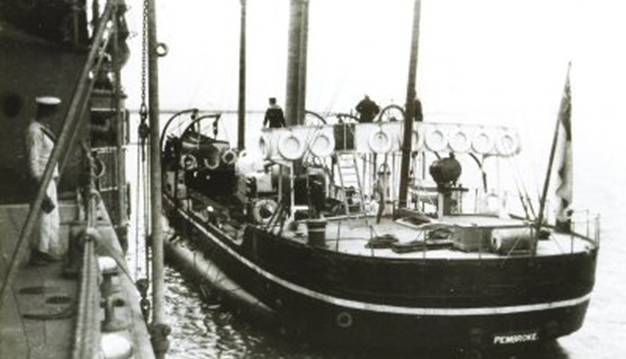
Pembroke (ex-Trent) after 1905 showing the pole masts which replaced her sailing rig

== Operational lives ==
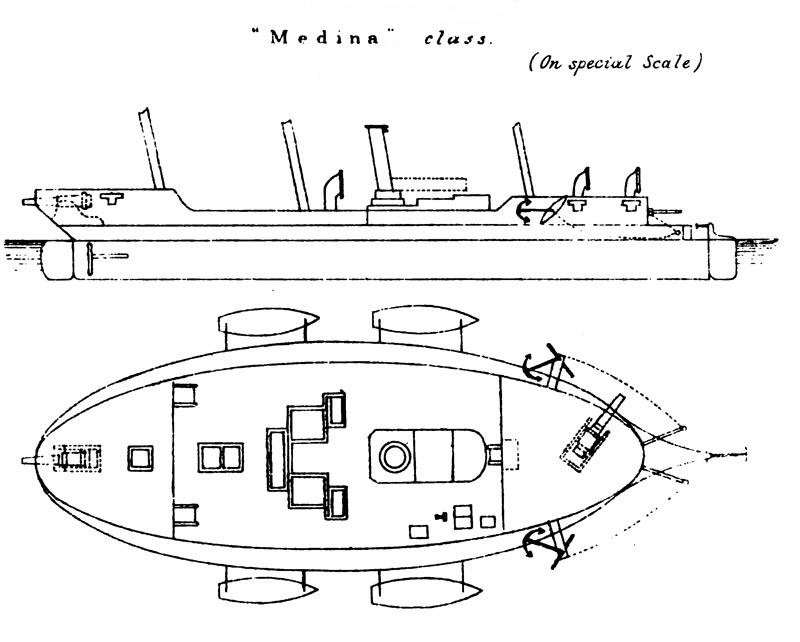
The deck plan of a Medina-class gunboat from Brassey's Naval Annual

Some of the ships of the class were appointed as tenders to battleships as soon as they were built: Medina tender to Duke of Wellington and Medway to Excellent, the gunnery school at Portsmouth. Spey was fitted in 1900 with three 4.7-inch guns for service at the gunnery school.

Dee and Don served in the Mediterranean in 1886 as part of an International squadron dominated by the Royal Navy. They both remained at Malta in various capacities for the rest of their lives. Tay had her armament reduced to a single 9-pounder gun and by 1914 was a tender to HMS Vivid, the Royal Navy barracks at Devonport. Esk and Tweed both served in Hong Kong in the 1890s, being sold there in the 1900s.

In all cases the crews were not expected to live on board their cramped ships when not at sea. Instead their living space was provided in accommodation hulks or the battleships to which the gunboats were tenders.

== Ships ==
Name	Ship Builder	Launched	Fate
Medina	Palmers Shipbuilding & Iron Company, Jarrow	3 August 1876	Sold at Bermuda in 1904.
Medway	Palmers Shipbuilding & Iron Company, Jarrow	3 October 1876	Sold at Bermuda in 1904. Sunk in St. George's harbour, her hull remains intact and can be seen breaking the water's surface at low tide. The ship is visible on satellite imagery at 32°22′32.7″N 64°41′13″W
Sabrina	Palmers Shipbuilding & Iron Company, Jarrow	3 October 1876	Renamed Sabine as a diving tender in 1916, renamed Vivid in 1920 (or late 1919), sold to B Fryer, Sunderland in July 1922
Spey	Palmers Shipbuilding & Iron Company, Jarrow	5 October 1876	Deleted c.1915 and sold in 1923
Tay	Palmers Shipbuilding & Iron Company, Jarrow	19 October 1876	Sold to Stanlee Shipbreaking Company, Dover 22 October 1920
Tees	Palmers Shipbuilding & Iron Company, Jarrow	19 October 1876	Sold to Harris Brothers, Bristol 9 July 1907
Dee	Palmers Shipbuilding & Iron Company, Jarrow	4 April 1877	Used for torpedo instruction at Malta 1892–1902 and sold there on 10 July 1902
Don	Palmers Shipbuilding & Iron Company, Jarrow	14 April 1877	Used as a concrete barge at Malta 1906–08, converted to a lighter in 1911 and sold there in 1914
Esk	Palmers Shipbuilding & Iron Company, Jarrow	28 April 1877	Sold at Hong Kong in April 1903
Slaney	Palmers Shipbuilding & Iron Company, Jarrow	28 April 1877	Diving tender in 1906, sold to Thos. W. Ward, Grays 30 August 1919, and arrived there 10 October 1919, but listed until 1921 and finally moved to Rainham, Kent to be broken up on 3 January 1923
Trent	Palmers Shipbuilding & Iron Company, Jarrow	23 August 1877	Renamed Pembroke in September 1905, then Gannet in June 1917 as a diving tender. Sold to the Dover Shipbreaking Company on 21 February 1923
Tweed	Palmers Shipbuilding & Iron Company, Jarrow	23 August 1877	Sold at Hong Kong on 21 November 1905

== Legacy ==
The gunboats Dee and Don spent a number of years moored next to each other in Kalkara, Malta. This resulted in the Maltese expression id-di u d-do, which refers to two people who are frequently seen together.

== Bibliography ==
- Dittmar, Frederick J. (1998). "Question 48/97". Warship International. XXXV (4): 416–419. ISSN 0043-0374.
- Preston, Antony; Major, John (2007). Send a Gunboat: The Victorian Navy and Supremacy at Sea, 1854–1904 (2nd ed.). London: Conway. ISBN 978-0-85177-923-2.
- Lyon, David & Winfield, Rif (2004). The Sail and Steam Navy List: All the Ships of the Royal Navy 1815–1889. Chatham Publishing. ISBN 978-1-86176-032-6. OCLC 52620555.
