= Flat-iron gunboat =

Type of gunboat

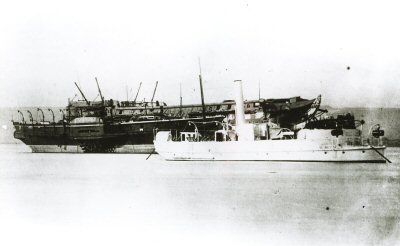
The flat-iron gunboat HMS Mastiff (right, painted white)

Flat-iron gunboats (more formally known as Rendel gunboats) were a number of classes of coastal gunboats generally characterised by small size, low freeboard, the absence of masts, (Note: Some Rendel-type gunboats were fitted with masts (the British Medina class, the Russian Sivutch class and at least some of the Chinese alphabeticals); they are included in the article for completeness) and the mounting of a single non-traversing large gun, aimed by pointing the vessel. They acquired their nickname from the physical similarity with the flat iron used for ironing clothes during the 19th century.

The first flat-iron gunboat was launched in 1867, and the last in 1894, with the vast majority being built in the years 1870–1880. They were designed as a cheap coastal defence weapon, a role they failed to achieve successfully; they found their greatest utility in offensive coastal bombardment. Strongly built, they lasted in some cases into the late 20th century, and saw action in both World Wars. The hull of the British flat-iron Medway lies in shallow water off Bermuda. The Norwegian flat-iron Tyr remains in service under the name Bjorn West, at last report entering Eidsvik shipyard in May 2014 for restoration.

== Origin ==
In 1867 Sir W G Armstrong & Company signed an agreement with a local shipbuilder, Dr. Charles Mitchell, whereby Mitchell's shipyard would build warships and Armstrong's company would provide the armaments. George Rendel was put in charge of the new venture, and the vessels designed under his leadership were based on a small craft used by the Armstrong factory to test heavy guns. With the assistance of the leading gunnery expert Admiral Sir Astley Cooper-Key, he turned these craft into a gunboat designed for defensive coastal operations.

== Description ==
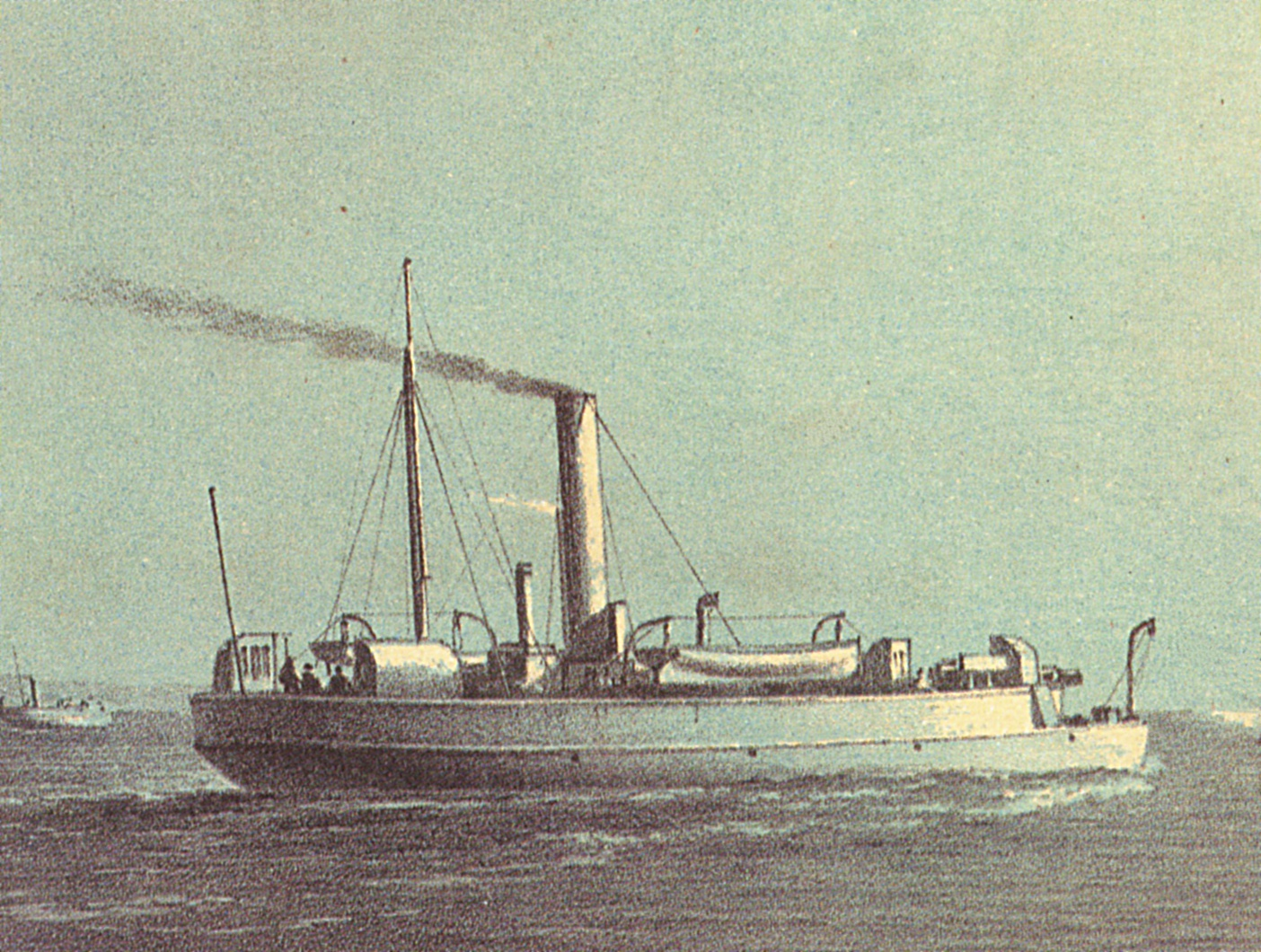
A painting of Comet, an Ant-class flat-iron gunboat, by William Frederick Mitchell

A typical flat-iron gunboat displaced about 250 tons, had a length of less than 100 feet (30 m) and drew only 6 feet (1.8 m). It was armed with a single large gun (normally 10 to 12 inches, but in the case of the Italian Castore class, a massive 16-inch weapon). The gun, which was mounted at the bow, was designed to be raised and lowered on a hydraulic mechanism so that stability would not be compromised when making sea passages. The gun was aimed by pointing the whole vessel, since the mounting allowed for elevation but not traversing (in the manner of an enormous punt gun). No rigging of any sort was provided, and twin screws were fitted, allowing for a much reduced draught while at the same time making them highly manoeuvrable. Top speed would have been less than 9 knots (17 km/h), but they were designed to be towed at considerably higher speeds than they were capable of making under their own power. The crew would have numbered about 30 men. Larger variations were built, with the German Wespe-class gunboats displacing as much as 1,157 tons. Masted versions were produced, particularly for navies with inadequate coaling facilities and long coastlines, and commensurate with an increase in displacement, armament and rigging, crews increased to match, with the Wespe class needing 76 men.

The original design was intended for defensive coastal operations, but was employed by the Royal Navy largely for offensive coastal bombardment, and in this sense was a natural successor to the Crimean gunboats of the "Great Armament" and the bomb vessels of the Napoleonic Wars. Operations of this nature require command of the sea, a situation which the Royal Navy could impose by virtue of its battlefleet throughout the period.

Few other navies of the time could hope to exercise much more than local sea control for limited periods, and these vessels were of limited use for shore bombardment in the hands of smaller or less effective operators. Nevertheless, these small vessels with their powerful punch were clearly attractive to the small and medium-size navies of the late 19th century, since they offered the status of big guns without the cost of large warships. This may account for some of the later vessels carrying monstrous 15- and 16-inch guns; flat-irons armed in this fashion were not used for long, probably because their weapons were all but useless except against a stationary target in a flat calm. The defining failure of flat-iron gunboats as coastal defence weapons was in China, where British-built gunboats were used against the French, at the Battle of Fuzhou, and the Japanese, at the Battle of Weihaiwei. In general the flat-iron gunboats found themselves outmanoeuvred and smothered by shellfire from the more stable enemy cruisers; many failed to get off more than one or two shots.

At 2.08 a Rendel gunboat came round Pagoda Point, and fired her 16-ton gun at the Duguay, but missed her. Immediately the guns of the fleet were concentrated upon this luckless craft, and the torrent of descending and exploding shells was so great that it literally stopped her way. Two minutes she remained almost stationary, a helpless target; then, with a crash, her magazine exploded, and she dived headlong to the bottom.

— H W Wilson, Ironclads in action

In contrast to their failure as coastal defence gunboats, the occasions when they were used for coastal bombardment were more successful; Argentine gunboats were used in 1890 to bombard rebels during the Revolution of the Park, Greek gunboats bombarded Turkish forces during the Greco-Turkish War of 1897 and both Bustard and Excellent (formerly HMS Handy) were part of the force that bombarded the Belgian coast during World War I. According to Professor Andrew Lambert the Royal Navy flat-irons succeeded in their task of deterrence, and were a key asset to the capability of coastal offensive operations.

== Operators ==
=== Australia ===
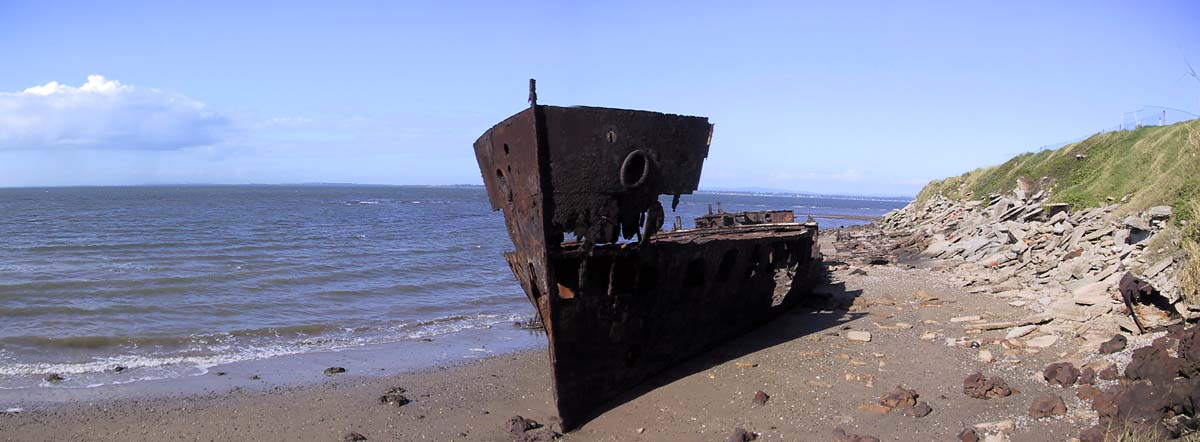
Gayundah beached off Woody Point, 2006

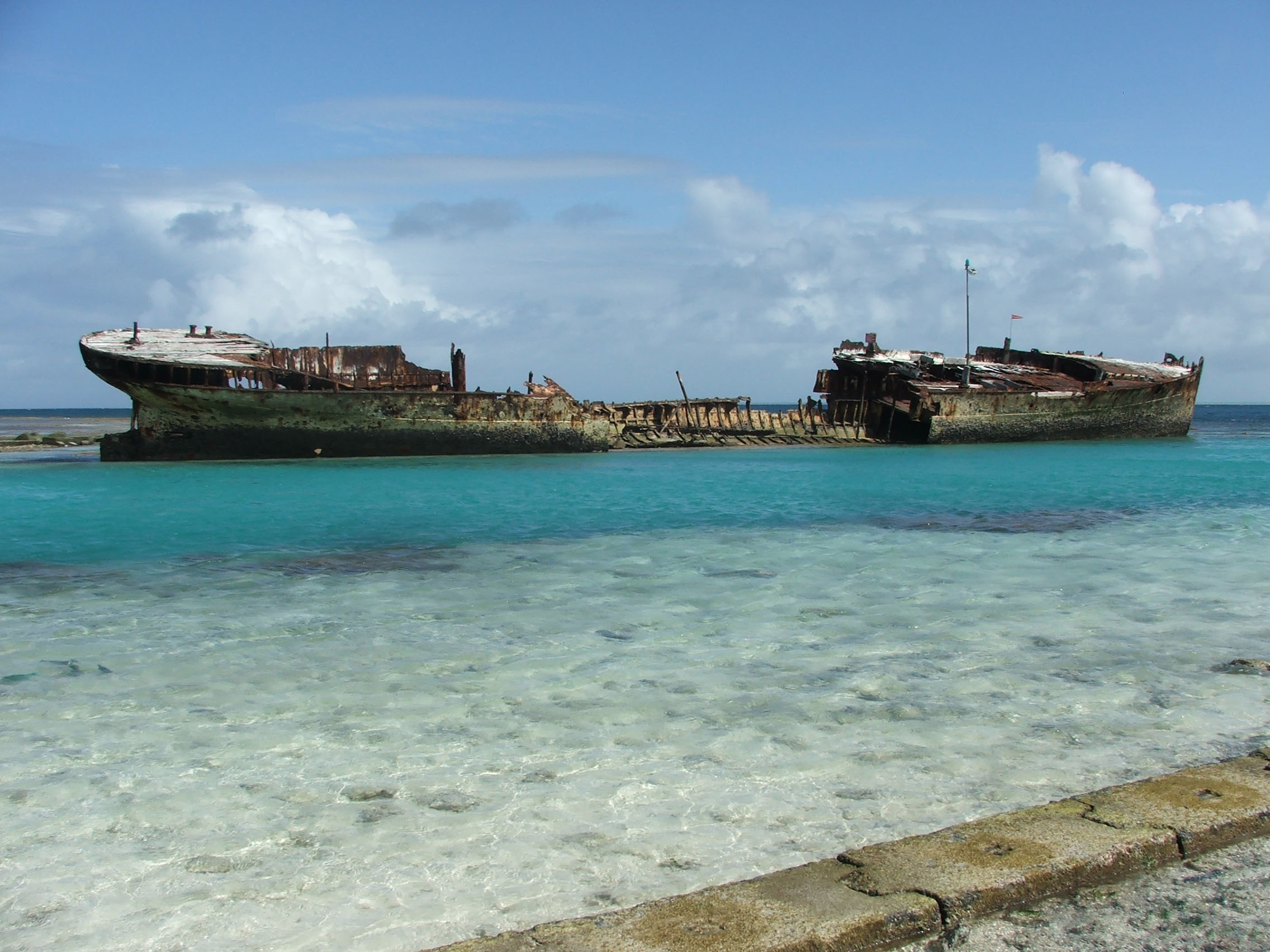
Protector at Heron Island, 2008

The Australian colonies of the British Empire purchased a number of gunboats for coastal defence during the 1880s, and while they were described as "flat-irons", they were masted, and Protector was almost the size of a light cruiser. The remains of both Protector and Gayundah remain visible today.

| Class | Vessels | Tonnage | Guns | Remarks |
|---|---|---|---|---|
| HMVS Albert | 1 | 350 | 8-inch (12.5-ton) BL | Armstrong type B1 |
| HMVS Victoria | 1 | 530 | 10-inch (25-ton) BL & 2 × 13-pdr BLs | Armstrong type D |
| HMCS Protector | 1 | 920 | 8-inch (12.5-ton) BL, 5 × 6-in (4-ton) BLs, 4 × 3-pdrs | Armstrong type F1 |
| Gayundah class | 2 | 360 | 8-inch (12.5-ton) BL & 6-inch (4-ton) BL | Armstrong type B1 |

=== Argentina ===
Argentina purchased four flat-iron gunboats from Laird Brothers, Birkenhead and J & G Rennie & Co, Greenwich, in 1875; they were grouped in two classes: Pilcomayo and Constitución. Described as bombarderas (bombarders) in Argentina, they were later variously employed as tankers, transports and pontoons, in some cases into the 1950s.

| Class | Vessels | Tonnage | Guns | Remarks |
|---|---|---|---|---|
| Pilcomayo class | 2 | 416 | 9.4-inch (240 mm) MLR & 2 × 3-inch (76 mm) guns | Scrapped in 1930s |
| Constitución class | 2 | 416 | 9.4-inch (240 mm) MLR & 2 × 3-inch (76 mm) guns | Scrapped in 1950s |

=== Chile ===
The Chilean government entered into talks to purchase two vessels similar to the Argentine units, but did not see the purchase through.

=== China ===
Between 1875 and 1880 China purchased 13 flat-iron gunboats from Britain and built another (Tiong Sing) at Shanghai. After the two Jiansheng class, the British-built boats were given names from the Greek alphabet, from Alpha through to Lambda, thus becoming known as the "alphabetical" gunboats. Although quickly given Chinese names, the class names seem to have stuck. A further pseudo-Rendel gunboat (Hoi Tung Hung) was built locally to the lines of the "alphabetical" flat-irons, but constructed from wood sheathed in iron. Fusheng and Jiansheng were lost in the Battle of Fuzhou in 1884 at the beginning of the Sino-French War. Four Chinese Rendel gunboats also took part in the Battle of the Yalu River against the Japanese in 1894. Eight Chinese flat-iron gunboats were sunk or captured by Japan at the battle of Weihaiwei in 1895.

| Class | Vessels | Tonnage | Guns | Remarks |
|---|---|---|---|---|
| Jiansheng class | 2 | 256 | 10-inch (250 mm) | Destroyed at the Battle of Fuzhou in 1884 |
| Tiong Sing | 1 | 200 | 6.7-inch (170 mm) | Built at Shanghai. Destroyed at Weihaiwei by the Japanese Navy |
| Alpha class | 2 | 420 | 11-inch (280 mm) | Scrapped in 1895 |
| Gamma class | 2 | 420 | 15-inch (380 mm) | Decommissioned in 1905 |
| Hoi Tung Hung (Note: Not strictly a flat-iron. Built of wood sheathed with iron in imitation of the "alphabetical" flat-irons.) | 1 | 430 | 15-inch (380 mm) | Destroyed at Weihaiwei by the Japanese Navy |
| Epsilon class | 4 | 440 | 15-inch (380 mm), 2 × 12-pdr | Captured at Weihaiwei by the Japanese Navy |
| Iota class | 3 | 440 | 15-inch (380 mm), 2 × 12-pdr | Two captured at Weihaiwei by the Japanese Navy |

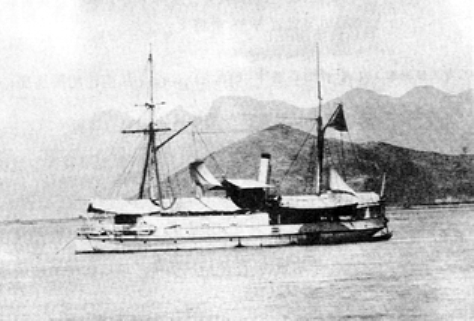
Chinese Jiansheng-class gunboat Jiansheng (建勝)

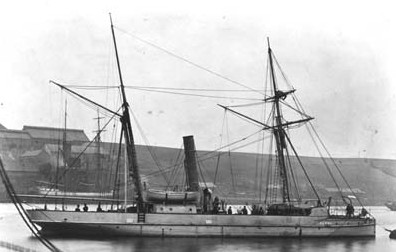
Chinese Alpha-class gunboat Longxiang (龍驤)

=== Denmark ===
Five boats in three classes were built in Danish shipyards in 1874 to 1876. Three were decommissioned at the turn of the 20th century, and the other two were decommissioned after World War I having served as repair ships.

| Class | Vessels | Tonnage | Guns | Remarks |
|---|---|---|---|---|
| Oresund class | 3 | 240 | 10-inch (250 mm) & 4 × 1-pdrs | Scrapped between 1912 and 1919 |
| Moen class | 1 | 410 | 10-inch (250 mm), 2 × 2-pdrs, 1 × 1-pdr | Scrapped in 1901 |
| Falster class | 1 | 383 | 10-inch (250 mm), 2 × 2-pdrs, 1 × 1-pdr | Scrapped in 1918 |

=== Germany ===
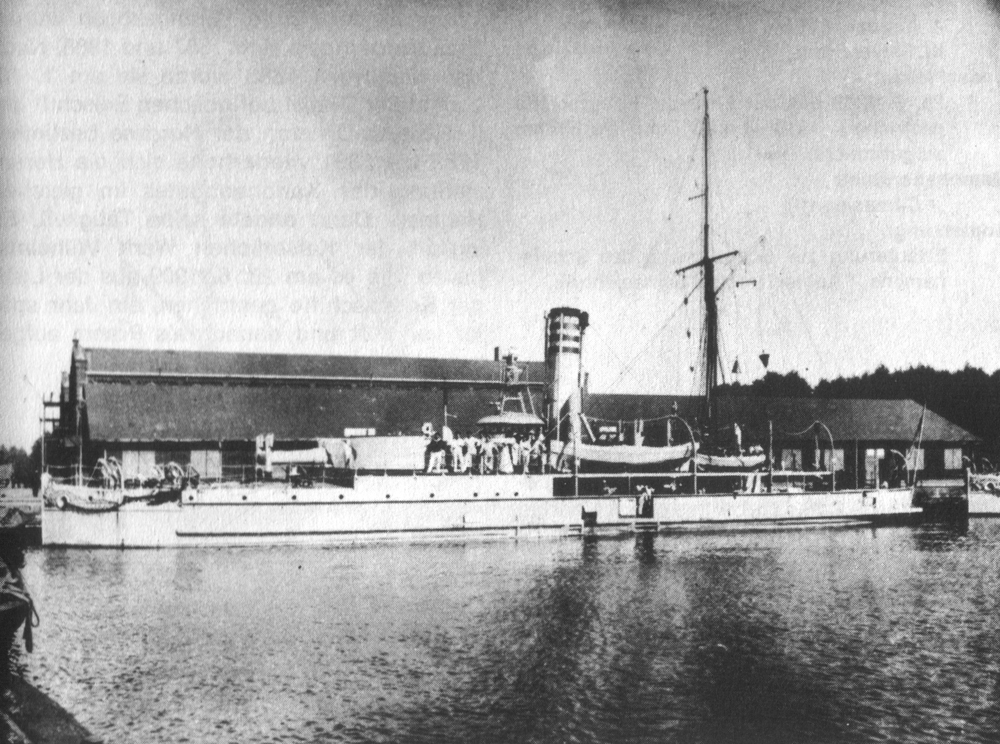
Wespe-class gunboat SMS Natter

The German Navy (Kaiserliche Marine) built eleven large Rendel gunboats (Panzerkanonenboot) of the Wespe class at AG Weser, Bremen between 1875 and 1881. One, SMS Salamander, was lost in 1910. Two smaller gunboats of Brummer class were built later in 1884.

| Class | Vessels | Tonnage | Guns | Remarks |
|---|---|---|---|---|
| Wespe-class gunboats | 11 | 1157 | 12-inch (300 mm) | Decommissioned 1909 - 1911 |
| Brummer class | 2 | 929 | 8.3-inch (210 mm) | Decommissioned 1903 - 1907 |

=== Greece ===
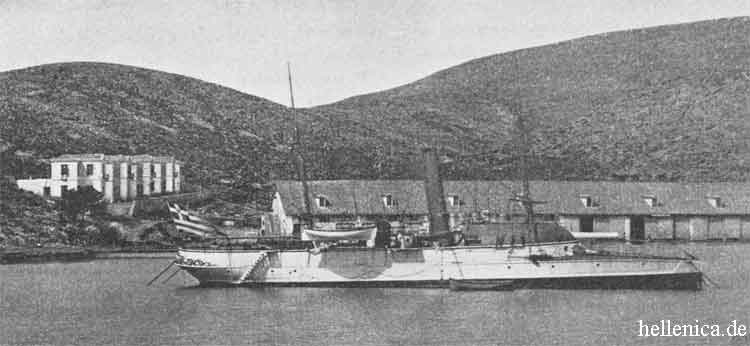
Greek gunboat Aktion

In 1881, Greece had two Rendel gunboats built at the Thames Ironworks and Shipbuilding Company for the shallow waters of the Ambracian Gulf. They saw action in the Greco-Turkish War of 1897 and Balkan Wars, served the Piraeus and Keratsini net barrage during World War I and were scrapped after World War I.

| Class | Vessels | Tonnage | Guns | Remarks |
|---|---|---|---|---|
| Spetses | 1 | 433 | 11-inch (280 mm), 1 × 6-inch | Renamed Akteon in 1889. Scrapped in 1919 |
| Amvrakia | 1 | 433 | 11-inch (280 mm), 1 × 6-inch | Scrapped in 1931 |

=== Italy ===
Italy built two Rendel gunboats at Spezia Dockyard in 1874. In the late 1880s 2 large Rendel gunboats were designed and built by Armstrong Mitchell & Co.'s Elswick Works to a contract by the Italian War Ministry. They were constructed in Elswick's Tyneside yard in the United Kingdom, disassembled and shipped to Italy for reassembly in the Armstrong facility at Pozzuoli. (Note: By coincidence, the manager of the Armstrong's Pozzuoli works was George Rendel, who had taken on the position in the hope that the warm Italian weather would improve his health.)

| Class | Vessels | Tonnage | Guns | Remarks |
|---|---|---|---|---|
| Guardiano class | 2 | 259 | 8.2-inch (210 mm) | Sold circa 1900 |
| Castore class | 2 | 522 | 16-inch (410 mm), 1 × 1.5-inch | Converted to barges and scrapped in 1911 & 1925 |

=== Japan ===
Japan captured six Rendel gunboats from China on 12 February 1895 at the Battle of Weihaiwei. They were listed for disposal in 1906 and broken up by 1907.

| Class | Vessels | Tonnage | Guns | Remarks |
|---|---|---|---|---|
| Epsilon class | 4 | 440 | 11-inch (280 mm), 2 × 3-inch | Captured from China. Rearmed as shown |
| Iota class | 2 | 440 | 11-inch (280 mm), 2 × 3-inch | Captured from China. Rearmed as shown |

=== Mexico ===
Two gunboats were commissioned from Armstrongs in 1875, but appear to have been heavily sparred, single-screw iron gunboats with an extensive sail area. Their short, broad dimensions and single large gun cause them to be taken for flat-irons, but illustrations show that they are not of the same type. They were scrapped in 1920.

=== Netherlands ===
Thirty-one flat-iron gunboats were built in the Dutch shipyards Christie, Nolet & De Kuyper and Feijenoord Mij in the years 1870 to 1880. Vahalis and the Hydra class were nearly all decommissioned before World War II (Sperwer was retained until 1960 as a training ship, and Brak sank in 1902). Ten of the Wodan class lasted long enough to be sunk or captured by the advancing German army in 1940.

| Class | Vessels | Tonnage | Guns | Remarks |
|---|---|---|---|---|
| Vahalis | 1 | 337 | 3 × 4.7-inch | Sold in July 1906 |
| Ever-class gunboats | 14 | 216 | 11-inch (280 mm), 1 × 2-inch & 3 × 1-pdrs | Scrapped in 1911 |
| Wodan-class gunboats | 16 | 240 | 11-inch (280 mm) & 3 × 1-pdrs | |

=== Norway ===
Eight flat-iron gunboats were built to a British design in Norwegian shipyards. They were all refitted as minelayers before World War I. Æger was decommissioned in 1932, but the others were all captured by Germany in 1940, and with the exception of Uller (Note: Uller was captured by invading German army, used to mine the entrance to the Norwegian-held Sognefjorden, and bombed by a Royal Norwegian Navy Air Service Heinkel He 115 on 1 May 1940. She was scuttled by her German-held sister, Tyr.) they survived WWII. They were gradually decommissioned by the Royal Norwegian Navy after World War II, but the Gor-class gunboat Tyr was still operating as the civilian ferry Bjørn West 100 years after she was built.

| Class | Vessels | Tonnage | Guns | Remarks |
|---|---|---|---|---|
| Vale class | 5 | 260 | 10.5-inch (270 mm) | Refitted as minelayers before WWI. |
| Gor class | 2 | 290 | 10-inch (250 mm) | Refitted as minelayers before WWI. |
| HNoMS Æger | 1 | 413 | 8.2-inch (210 mm) | Decommissioned in 1932 |

=== Russia ===
Russia built ten Rendel gunboats in three classes between 1874 and 1881.

| Class | Vessels | Tonnage | Guns | Remarks |
|---|---|---|---|---|
| Ersh class | 1 | 321 | 11-inch (280 mm) | Scrapped in 1906 |
| Nerpa class | 1 | 380 | 6-inch (150 mm) | Scrapped in 1888 |
| Burun class | 8 | 380 | 11-inch (280 mm), 2 × 3.4-inch | 3.4-inch guns replaced by 2½-pounders. Scrapped between 1902 and 1907 |

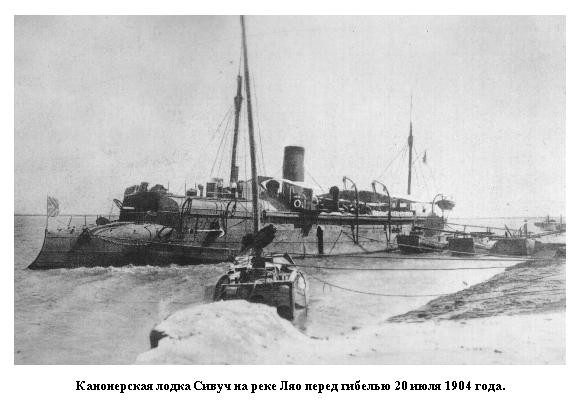
The Russian gunboat Sivutch

Two Sivutch-class gunboats were also constructed which had a brig rig (later replaced by a ship rig, and later still de-rigged). They were armed with a single 9-inch gun and a single 6-inch gun aft. Visually they were very similar to the British Medina class.

=== Sweden ===
Sweden built 10 Rendel gunboats in Stockholm and Norrköping between 1868 and 1876.

| Class | Vessels | Tonnage | Guns | Remarks |
|---|---|---|---|---|
| Garmer class | 3 | 241 - 271 | 9.4-inch (240 mm) or 10.6-inch | Scrapped circa 1898 |
| Hildur class | 7 | 457 | 9.4-inch (240 mm) | Sold circa 1919 |

=== United Kingdom ===
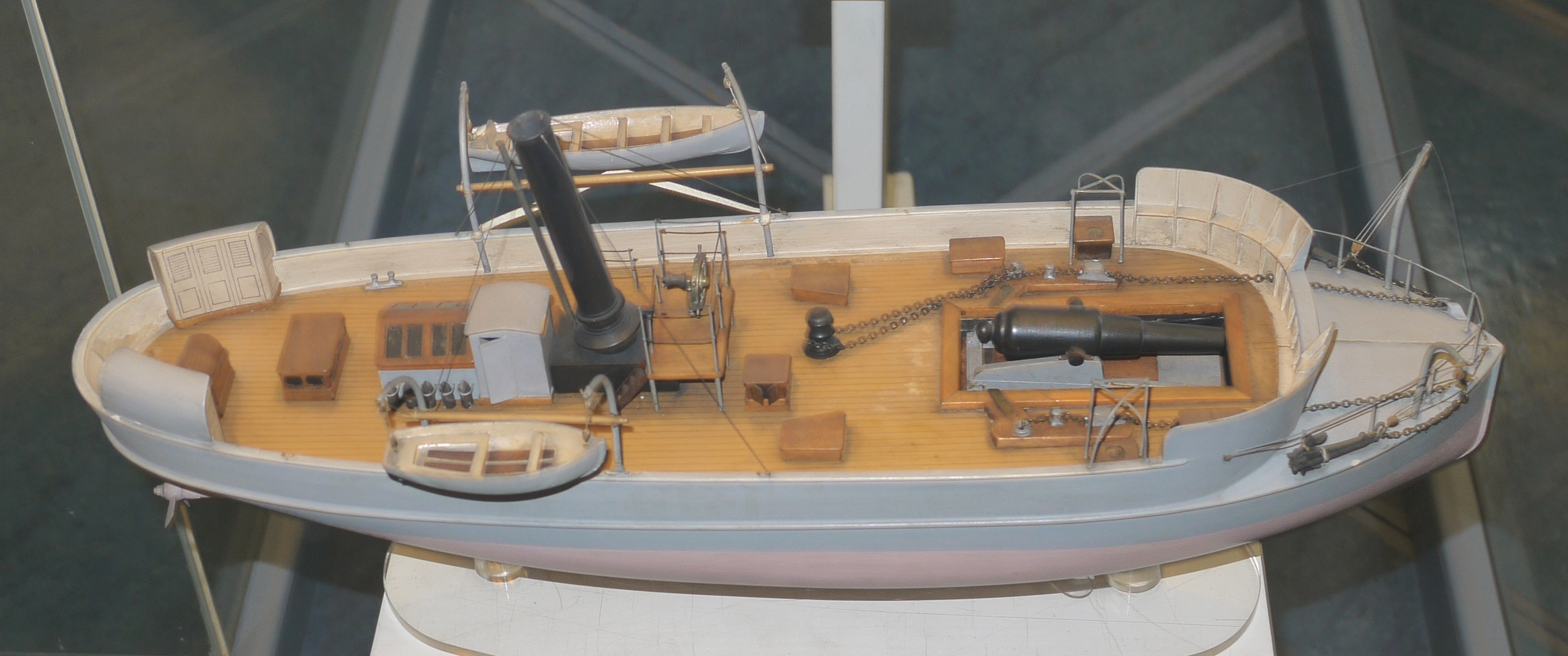
A model of an Ant-class gunboat

The Royal Navy had two classes of flat-iron gunboats built in the 1870s and 1880s, and several one-off prototypes. As built they were equipped with a single 9- or 10-inch muzzle-loading rifled gun (MLR). They were of sound construction, and many stayed in service in support roles, with a number ending up as gunnery tenders, lighters, tank vessels and dredgers. One notable gunnery tender was Bustard, which was rearmed prior to World War One. During World War I Bustard, Drudge and Handy (renamed Excellent from 1891), and possibly Mastiff (renamed Snapper in 1914) and Ant, took part in a bombardment of the Belgian coast. The majority of the flat-iron gunboats had been scrapped before the mid-20th century but Handy survived until she was broken up in 2008 amid safety concerns.

For many years, it was assumed that the Royal Navy flat-irons were a failure at their perceived role of coastal defence. Professor Andrew Lambert later argued powerfully that they were designed for coastal assault as successors to the gunboats of the Crimean War "Great Armament", and that they succeeded in their deterrent role. He describes them as a "part of a sophisticated, layered approach to the tactical problem of defeating large-scale coastal defence systems." The Royal Navy listed them as "Gunboats for the Attack and Defence of Coasts" in its confidential Pink List. Due to their lack of speed and limited armament they were of little value in defence of a coast or harbour, but they were ideally suited for bombardment of shore fortifications where the Royal Navy enjoyed complete command of the sea.

| Class | Vessels | Tonnage | Guns | Remarks |
|---|---|---|---|---|
| HMS Staunch | 1 | 164 | 9-inch (12-ton) MLR | The first flat-iron gunboat. |
| HMS Plucky | 1 | 193 | 9-inch (12-ton) MLR | |
| Ant class | 20 | 241 | 10-inch (18-ton) MLR | |
| Gadfly class | 4 | 241 | 10-inch (18-ton) MLR | Identical to, and sometimes listed as part of the Ant class |
| Medina class | 12 | 363 | 3 × 6.3-inch MLR | Fitted with a barquentine rig |
| Bouncer class | 2 | 265 | 10-inch MLR | Similar to Ant class, but longer and employing steel instead of iron |
| HMS Handy | 1 | 508 | 7.5-inch & 1 × 4-inch (Note: Drudge and Handy were designed for testing the 13.5-inch main armament of the Royal Sovereign, and both were later taken into the Royal Navy. Their armament in military service may have changed over the years; both became tenders to HMS Excellent, the Royal Navy's gunnery school. Drudge was armed at one stage with the 9.2-inch BL Mk IX; it is likely this would have changed to allow training on the latest weapons as they came into service.) | Sold by Armstrong Mitchell in 1884 to the Royal Navy after trialling a 13.5-inch gun mounting |
| HMS Drudge | 1 | 890 | 9.2-inch BL | Built for the Ordnance Department and transferred to the Royal Navy in 1901 |

Staunch and Plucky were essentially prototypes built in 1867 and 1870. Handy and Drudge were built in the 1880s for testing the mounting of 13.5-inch guns intended for the Royal Sovereign-class battleships.

The Medina class were a development of the flat-iron concept which resulted in an iron coastal gunboat fitted with three masts and carrying three 6.3-inch 64-pounder rifled muzzle-loading guns. Naval historian Antony Preston described them as "the most grotesque craft ever seen". The hull of Medway remains visible on satellite imagery at 32°22′32.7″N 64°41′13″W.
