= List of ship launches in 1876 =

The following ships were launched in 1876.

Date	Ship	Class / type	Builder	Location	Country	Notes
1 January	Trenton	Frigate	New York Navy Yard	Brooklyn	United States	United States Navy
11 January	Glendaruel	Merchantman	Messrs. Barclay, Curle & Co	Whiteinch	United Kingdom	For Messrs. J. & A. Allen.
11 January	Salisbury	Hopper barge	Messrs. T. Wingate & Co.	Whiteinch	United Kingdom	For Indian Government.
12 January	A. 1.	Barque	Bartram, Haswell & Co	Sunderland	United Kingdom	For Messrs. Porritt, Webster & Co.
12 January	Gem	Schooner	Messrs. James Wallace & Son	Perth	United Kingdom	For Mr. Miller.
14 January	Alexander Nichol	Schooner	Messrs. J. Duthie & Sons	Aberdeen	United Kingdom	For Aberdeen Lime Company.
14 January	Annie Lloyd	Merchantman		Bwlch	United Kingdom	For private owner.
15 January	Kate Bousfield	Barque	Messrs. Alexander MacLaine & Sons	Belfast	United Kingdom	For private owner.
17 January	Zoe	Barque	Messrs. W. H. Potter & Co.	Liverpool	United Kingdom	For Messrs. Henry Whittle & Co.
18 January	Geltwood	Barque	R. Williamson & Sons	Harrington	United Kingdom	For John Sprott.
25 January	Clairmont	Barque	Messrs. Dobie & Co.	Govan	United Kingdom	For private owner.
26 January	Carisbrooke	Paddle steamer	Messrs. Barclay, Curle & Co.	Whiteinch	United Kingdom	For Southampton, Isle of Wight, and South of England Steam Packet Company.
26 January	Mary Jose	Barque	Messrs. Birell, Stenhouse & Co.	Dumbarton	United Kingdom	For John Jose.
26 January	Silhet	Merchantman	Messrs. Barclay, Curle & Co.	Whiteinch	United Kingdom	For Messrs. Thomson, Aikman & Co.
27 January	J.J.B.	Brigantine	Edwin Barter	Brixham	United Kingdom	For John Browning and others.
28 January	Brambletye	Full-rigged ship	Barrow Ship Building Co. Ltd.	Barrow-in-Furness	United Kingdom	For W. R. Price.
28 January	Mabel Jessie	Schooner	Paul Rodgers	Carrickfergus	United Kingdom	For Messrs. J. Wigrall & Co.
28 January	Wild Swan	Osprey-class sloop	Robert Napier and Sons	Govan	United Kingdom	For Royal Navy.
29 January	Anglo-Norman	Barque	Messrs. Russell & Co.	Port Glasgow	United Kingdom	For Messrs. Frost & Co.
29 January	Queen of Palmyra	Yacht	A. Palmer	Southampton	United Kingdom	For Marquess of Exeter.
29 January	Trentham Hall	Steamship	London and Glasgow Shipbuilding Company	Govan	United Kingdom	For Hall Line.
31 January	Denbighshire	East Indiaman	Messrs. Thomas Royden & Sons	Liverpool	United Kingdom	For Messrs. Hughes & Co.
January	Alsatia	Steamship	Messrs. D. & W. Henderson & Co.	Partick	United Kingdom	For Anchor Line.
January	Gwrtheyrn Castle	Barque	Osborne, Graham & Co.	Sunderland	United Kingdom	For R. Rees.
1 February	Tredagh	Paddle steamer	A. & J. Inglis	Glasgow	United Kingdom	For Drogheda Steam Packet Company.
7 February	Easdale	Steamship	Messrs. Russell & Co.	Port Glasgow	United Kingdom	For Mr. White and others.
8 February	Lord Elgin	Paddle steamer	Messrs. Richardson, Duck & Co.	Stockton-on-Tees	United Kingdom	For John Kidd.
9 February	Shamrock	Paddle steamer	Messrs. Laird & Co.	Birkenhead	United Kingdom	For London and North Western Railway.
9 February	The Canoma	Barque	Messrs. Birrell, Stenhouse & Co.	Dumbarton	United Kingdom	For L. Macpherson.
10 February	Lizzie Porter	Schooner	Messrs. W. Allsup & Sons	Preston	United Kingdom	For Messrs. Edmund Porter & Co.
10 February	Lord Kinnaird	Barque	Messrs. Brown & Simpson	Dundee	United Kingdom	For private owner.
10 February	Marti-Colodar	Barque	Messrs. John Reid & Co.	Port Glasgow	United Kingdom	For "Vdn de J. Marti-Colodar".
10 February	Regard	Schooner		Troon	United Kingdom	For private owner.
10 February	S. A. Sadler	Steamship	Messrs. Raylton, Dixon & Co.	Middlesbrough	United Kingdom	For J. M. Lennard.
12 February	Ballater	Steamship	Messrs. Hall, Russell & Co.	Aberdeen	United Kingdom	For Messrs. J. & A. Davidson.
12 February	Belleisle	Belleisle-class ironclad	Samuda Brothers	Poplar, London	United Kingdom	For Royal Navy.
12 February	Hermani	Steamship	Messrs. Cunliffe & Dunlop	Port Glasgow	United Kingdom	For private owner.
12 February	John Stirling	Paddle steamer		Kinghorn	United Kingdom	For private owner.
12 February	Raven	Yawl	M. E. Ratsey	cowes	United Kingdom	For Colonel Stirling.
12 February	Roses	Paddle steamer	Messrs. T. B. Seath & Co.	Rutherglen	United Kingdom	For Morecambe Steam Packet Co.
12 February	The Lagan	Steam barge	Harland & Wolff	Belfast	United Kingdom	For A. Guinness & Sons.
14 February	Hobart	Hopper barge	Messrs. Thomas Wingate & Co.	Whiteinch	United Kingdom	For Indian Government.
19 February	Ann Jones	Schooner	John Jones	Aberystwyth	United Kingdom	For Edward Jones.
19 February	Thursby	Cargo ship	Harland & Wolff	Belfast	United Kingdom	For W. Thursby.
22 February	Centennial	Schooner	Robert Crosbie	Chelsea, Massachusetts	United Kingdom	For Beebe & Hopkins.
24 February	Nokomia	Barque	Messrs. Alexander Stephens & Sons	Linthouse	United Kingdom	For Bartholomew M'Corkell.
24 February	Prince Leopold	Paddle steamer	Messrs. Barclay, Curle & Co.	Whiteinch	United Kingdom	For Southampton, Isle of Wigh, and South of England Steam Packet Company.
24 February	Roxburghshire	Merchantman	Messrs. Dobie & Co.	Govan	United Kingdom	For Messrs. Thomas Law & Co.
24 February	Sir Walter Raleigh	Merchantman	Messrs. James & George Thompson	Clydebank	United Kingdom	For Messrs. Donaldson, Rose & Co.
24 February	Tourville	Duquesne-class cruiser	Société Nouvelle des Forges et Chantiers de la Méditerranée	La Seyne-sur-Mer	France	For French Navy
26 February	Jessie May	Paddle ferry	Messrs. Edwards & Symes	Cubitt Town	United Kingdom	For Thames Steam Ferry Company.
26 February	Scot	Tug	Messrs. Cunliffe & Dunlop	Port Glasgow	United Kingdom	For Messrs. James Grier & Sons.
26 February	Sir Walter Raleigh	Steamship	Messrs. W. Allsup & Sons	Preston	United Kingdom	For Great Western Railway.
27 February	Taurus	Steam yacht	Barrow Ship Building Co. Ltd.	Barrow-in-Furness	United Kingdom	For John T. Clifton.
29 February	Hestia	Steamship	Messrs. Henry Murray & Co.	Port Glasgow	United Kingdom	For Messrs. Thomas Russell & Sons.
February	John Chapman	Tender	builder	Grimsby	United Kingdom	For private owner.
February	Nubian	Steamship	Charles Mitchell & Co.	Newcastle upon Tyne	United Kingdom	For Union Steamship Co.
2 March	Devon	Steamship	Merksworth Shipbuilding Co.	Paisley	United Kingdom	For Launceston and North West Co.
5 March	Parana	Ocean liner	Chantier La Ciotat	La Ciotat	France	For: Cie. des Messageries Impériales
7 March	Dayspring	Fishing smack	George Brown	Wilmington	United Kingdom	For J. Robins.
8 March	Lord Mar	Paddle steamer	Messrs. Richardson, Duck & Son	Stockton-on-Tees	United Kingdom	For John Kidd.
9 March	Zieten	Aviso	Thames Iron Works	Blackwall	United Kingdom	For Kaiserliche Marine.
10 March	Anna Brainschweig	Brigantine		Portmadoc	United Kingdom	For David Jones.
11 March	Duquesne	Duquesne-class cruiser	Arsenal de Rochefort	Rochefort	France	For French Navy.
11 March	Kate	Steamship	Messrs. Thomas Turnbull & Son	Whitby	United Kingdom	For Messrs. James Gray & Co.
11 March	Nellie	Steamship		Whitby	United Kingdom	For private owner.
11 March	Wallace	Steam lighter	William Swan & Son	Kelvindock	United Kingdom	For private owner.
13 March	Childwall Hall	Steamship	London and Glasgow Shipbuilding Co.	Govan	United Kingdom	For Hall Line.
14 March	Maggie	Schooner	John Watt	Dysart	United Kingdom	For John M'Lauchlan.
22 March	Curlew	Steam hopper barge	Messrs. John Elder & Co.	Fairfield	United Kingdom	For Indian Government.
22 March	Mudlark	Steam hopper barge	Messrs. John Elder & Co.	Fairfield	United Kingdom	For Indian Government.
23 March	Jorge Juan	Jorge Juan-class sloop	Société Nouvelle des Forges et Chantiers de la Méditerranée	La Seyne-sur-Mer	France	For Spanish Navy.
23 March	Sánchez Barcáiztegui	Jorge Juan-class sloop	Société Nouvelle des Forges et Chantiers de la Méditerranée	La Seyne-sur-Mer	France	For Spanish Navy.
23 March	Snipe	Steam hopper barge	Messrs. John Elder & Co.	Fairfield	United Kingdom	For Indian Government.
25 March	Alice Mary	Barque	N. Gibbon	Sunderland	United Kingdom	For John Frazer & Co.
25 March	Corso	Steamship	Messrs. Bowdler, Chaffer & Co	Seacombe	United Kingdom	For Messrs. Strong, Reid & Page.
25 March	Penguin	Osprey-class sloop	Robert Napier and Sons	Govan	United Kingdom	For Royal Navy.
25 March	The Princess	Steamboat	Goole Shipbuilding Co.	Goole	United Kingdom	For Goole and Hull Steam Packet Company.
28 March	Aristides	Merchantman	Messrs. Walter Hood & Co.	Footdee	United Kingdom	For Messrs. George Thompson Jr., & Co.
28 March	Empress of India	Full-rigged ship	Messrs. Richardson, Duck & Co.	South Stockton-on-Tees	United Kingdom	For Messrs. Richardson, Duck & Co.
28 March	Confiance	Schooner	Former Arman yard	Quai Sainte‑Croix, Bordeaux.	France	For: Tandonnet et frères
30 March	Nepaul	Steamship	Messrs. Alexander Stephen & Sons	Linthouse	United Kingdom	For Peninsular and Oriental Steam Navigation Company.
March	Birchvale	Merchantman	Messrs. Hamilton & Co.	Port Glasgow	United Kingdom	For John Hay.
March	Cooleen	Barque	Messrs. John Elder & Sons	Fairfield	United Kingdom	For William M. Barkley.
March	Helena Mena	Barque	Robert Thompson Jr.	Sunderland	United Kingdom	For John Wilson.
March	King Omaru	Steamship	Messrs. Aitken & Mansel	Renfrew	United Kingdom	For Messrs. Alexander Miller, Brother & Co.
March	Maggie	Schooner	Mr. M'Laughlin	Aberdeen	United Kingdom	For Mr. M'Laughlin.
March	Sovereign	Barque	Richard Thompson	Sunderland	United Kingdom	For R. Richardson & Co.
March	Tientsin	Steamship	Messrs. Scott & Co.	Greenock	United Kingdom	For private owner.
1 April	Ben Nevis	Paddle tug	Messrs. Hall, Russell & Co.	Footdee	United Kingdom	For Ben Line Steam Tug Co.
6 April	Formosa	Steamship	Messrs. Cunliffe & Dunlop	Port Glasgow	United Kingdom	For British and African Steam Navigation Company.
8 April	Advent	Steamship	Short Bros.	Sunderland	United Kingdom	For James Westoll.
10 April	Moor Hen	Steam yacht	Frank Hedley Sr.	West Hartlepool	United Kingdom	For private owners.
10 April	Rose Bud	Schooner	Messrs. Carnegie & Matthew	Peterhead	United Kingdom	For private owner.
11 April	Bessie	Steam yacht	J. S. White	Cowes	United Kingdom	For Earl of Harrington.
11 April	Lochranza Castle	Schooner	Messrs. P. Barclay & Son	Ardrossan	United Kingdom	For private owner.
12 April	Silurian	Steamship	Messrs. Schlesinger, Davis & Co.	Wallsend	United Kingdom	For private owner.
12 April	St. Clair	Steamship	Messrs. Birrell, Stenhouse & Co.	Dumbarton	United Kingdom	For Messrs. John M'Callum & Co.
20 April	E. J. Harland	Sailing ship	Harland & Wolff	Belfast	United Kingdom	For Thomas Dixon & Co.
20 April	Mangana	Steamship	Messrs. David & William Henderson & Co.	Meadowside	United Kingdom	For Tasmanian Steam Navigation Co.
22 April	Turquoise	Emerald-class corvette	Earle's Shipbuilding	Hull	United Kingdom	For Royal Navy.
25 April	Belle of Dunkerque	Steamship	Messrs. Blackwood & Gordon	Port Glasgow	United Kingdom	For Messrs. Weatherley, Mead & Hussey.
25 April	Bonnie Doon	Paddle steamer	Messrs. T. B. Seath & Co.	Rutherglen	United Kingdom	For West Coast Steam Packet Company.
25 April	Emily Millington	Schooner	James Banks	Selby	United Kingdom	For John Millington.
25 April	Niobe	Steamship	Messrs. Murdoch & Murray	Port Glasgow	United Kingdom	For Messrs. Pile & Co.
25 April	Teal	Steamship	Messrs. M. Pearse & Co.	Stockton-on-Tees	United Kingdom	For private owner.
25 April	Vigilant	Paddle steamer	Messrs. Bowdler, Chaffer & Co.	Seacombe	United Kingdom	For Mersey Docks and Harbour Board.
25 April	Welsh Boy	Schooner	William Thomas	Amlwch	United Kingdom	For Mr. Roberts.
26 April	Lyra	Steam yacht	Messrs. Camper & Nicholson	Gosport	United Kingdom	For Sir William R. Brown.
26 April	Malaga	Steamship	Messrs. W. Gray & Co.	West Hartlepool	United Kingdom	For private owner.
26 April	Scottish Chieftain	Steamship	Messrs. Richardson, Duck & Co.	Stockton-on-Tees	United Kingdom	For Messrs. W. H. Ross & Co.
26 April	Taminoah	Steamship	Messrs. Dobie & Co.	Govan	United Kingdom	For John Cook.
27 April	Inflexible	Ironclad battleship	Portsmouth Dockyard	Portsmouth	United Kingdom	For Royal Navy.
27 April	Lord Houghton	Steamship	Barrow Ship Building Co. Ltd.	Barrow-in-Furness	United Kingdom	For Goole Steam Shipping Co. Ltd.
27 April	Snaefell	Paddle steamer	Caird and Company	Greenock	United Kingdom	For Isle of Man Steam Packet Company.
28 April	Shandon Belle	Steamship	James E. Scott	Greenock	United Kingdom	For City of Cork Steam Packet Co.
29 April	Mary Low	Barque	Messrs. Robert Duncan & Co.	Port Glasgow	United Kingdom	For Messrs. John Low & Co.
April	Alice	Steamboat	Messrs. T. B. Seath & Co.	Rutherglen	United Kingdom	For private owner.
April	Chislehurst	Steamship	Abercorn Shipbuilding Co.	Paisley	United Kingdom	For Messrs. Pile & Co.
April	Famenoth	Merchantman	Messrs. Dobie & Co.	Govan	United Kingdom	For John Cook.
April	Ossian	Steamship	Messrs. Swan & Son	Maryhill	United Kingdom	For James Ross.
April	Padishah	Merchantman	Messrs. R. Steele & Co	Greenock	United Kingdom	For private owner.
April	Paula	Barque	Lürings Yard	Hammelwarden	Germany	For A Schiff & Co.
April	Pioneer	Steamship	Messrs. J. & G. Thomson	Dalmmuir	United Kingdom	For M. H. Koch.
April	Ravensdowne	Steamship	Messrs. Aitken, Mansel & Co	Whiteinch	United Kingdom	For private owner.
April	Scottish Bard	Merchantman	London and Glasgow Shipbuilding Co.	Govan	United Kingdom	For Messrs. M'Ilwraith, M'Eacharn & Co.
April	S. P. W.	Schooner			United Kingdom	For Messrs. J. Westcott & Sons.
April	Stella	Steamship		Greenock	United Kingdom	For Governor of New Zealand.
April	Uhlan	Torpedo boat	Stettin Engine Co.	Stettin	Germany	For Kaiserliche Marine.
April	Werra	Merchantman	Messrs. Alexander Stephen & Sons	Linthouse	United Kingdom	For Wätjen & Co.
4 May	Ben Lomond	Paddle tug	Messrs. Hall, Russell & Co.	Footdee	United Kingdom	For Ben Line Steam Tug Co.
5 May	Benmore	Paddle steamer	Messrs. T. B. Seath & Co.	Rutherglen	United Kingdom	For Robert Campbell.
6 May	Cameo	Steamship	Messrs. Earle's	Hull	United Kingdom	For Wilson Line.
6 May	Dora Ann	Barque	James Laing	Sunderland	United Kingdom	For Richard James.
8 May	Duilio	Ironclad battleship	Regio Cantiere di Castellammare di Stabia	Castellamare di Stabia	Italy	For Regia Marina.
8 May	Elia	Brig	Messrs. Alexander Hall & Co.	Footdee	United Kingdom	For Henry P. Watt.
9 May	Beauséant	Yacht	Messrs. Camper & Nicholson	Gosport	United Kingdom	For C. Milward.
9 May	Bruce	Steam lighter	Messrs. William Swan & Co.	Maryhill	United Kingdom	For George M'Farlane and Bellfield Chemical Works.
9 May	Ellora	Merchantman	Messrs. Barclay, Curle & Co.	Whiteinch	United Kingdom	For Messrs. Thomas Aikman & Co.
9 May	Harriet Shiel	Steamship	Messrs. Raylton, Dixon & Co	Middlesbrough	United Kingdom	For Thomas Shiel.
9 May	Iris	Steamship	Messrs. A. & J. Inglis	Pointhouse	United Kingdom	For Glasgow and Londonderry Steam Packet Co.
9 May	Temeraire	Ironclad battleship		Chatham Dockyard	United Kingdom	For Royal Navy.
10 May	Fulda	Barque	Messrs. Alexander Stephen & Sons	Linthouse	United Kingdom	For Messrs. Wätjen & Co.
11 May	Carolina	Steamship	London and Glasgow Shipbuilding Co.	Govan	United Kingdom	For Messrs. J. T. Nickels & Co.
11 May	Gladys	Schooner	Harland & Wolff	Belfast	United Kingdom	For N. Mathieson.
11 May	Naiad	Full-rigged ship	Messrs. Bowdler, Chaffer & Co.	Seacombe	United Kingdom	For Messrs. J. Walmsley & Co. Collided with the Mersey Flat Thomas on being launched.
13 May	Waitaki	Steamship	Messrs. Thomas Wingate & Co.	Whiteinch	United Kingdom	For John Durling.
20 May	Barnsley	Steamship	John Elder & Co.	Govan	United Kingdom	For Manchester, Sheffield and Lincolnshire Railway.
20 May	Lillie	Schooner	Pierce, Montgomery & Howard	Chelsea, Massachusetts	United States	For Boston Pilots.
20 May	Maritana	Steamship	Messrs. Murdoch & Murray.	Port Glasgow	United Kingdom	For Messrs. William Cruickshanks & Co.
22 May	Oneagh	Schooner	Messrs. C. Hansen & Sons	Cowes	United Kingdom	For J. R. Cope.
22 May	Wakatipu	Steamship	Messrs. William Denny & Bros.	Dumabrton	United Kingdom	For New Zealand Union Steamship Co.
23 May	D. L. Mackenzie	Schooner	William Cook	Stornoway	United Kingdom	For Æneas M. Mackenzie.
24 May	Argonaut	Merchantman	Messrs. Barclay, Curle & Co.	Whiteinch	United Kingdom	For Messrs. A. & J. H. Carmichael.
24 May	Gwendolin	Schooner	Messrs. Camper & Nicholson	Gosport	United Kingdom	For private owner.
24 May	Mirim	Paddle steamer	Messrs. Murdoch & Murray	Port Glasgow	United Kingdom	For Messrs. John Proudfoot & Co.
24 May	Regent Murray	Merchantman	Messrs. David & William Henderson & Co.	Partick	United Kingdom	For James Dickie.
25 May	Lucy March	Barquentine	David Williams	Pwllheli	United Kingdom	For Henry Thomas and Mr. Marsh.
25 May	Scale Duck	Fishing smack	William Harvey	Londonderry	United Kingdom	For George Leek.
26 May	Willunga	Hopper dredger	Messrs. W. Simons & Co.	Renfrew	United Kingdom	For South Australian Government.
27 May	Cavan	Paddle steamer	Messrs. Laird Bros.	Birkenhead	United Kingdom	For City of Dublin Steam Packet Company.
27 May	Diana	Cutter	Hugh Boag	Fairlie	United Kingdom	For Mr. Coats.
27 May	Gertrude	Humber Keel	George Brown	Hull	United Kingdom	For Messrs. Keeling & Johnsof.
27 May	Polynesian	Barque	Messrs. Robert Duncan & Co.	Port Glasgow	United Kingdom	For Arthur Cotter and others.
30 May	Loch Awe	Steamship	Messrs. Muir & Caldwell	Ford	United Kingdom	For Messrs. D. Hutcheson & Co.
31 May	William George	Schooner	Robert Jones	Voryd	United Kingdom	For Mr. Williams.
May	Aberlemno	Clipper	Messrs. Birrell, Stenhouse & Co.	Dumbarton	United Kingdom	For private owner.
May	Agnes Murray	Merchantman	Messrs. H. Murray & Co.	Port Glasgow	United Kingdom	For James Law.
May	Amelia	Barque	J. E. Scott	Cartsdyke	United Kingdom	For private owner.
May	Amphibious	Paddle steamer	Bevan & Cooke	Melbourn	Victoria	For L. Iannacone.
May	Aristides	East Indiaman	Messrs. Walter Hood & Co.	Aberdeen	United Kingdom	For George Thompson Jr.
May	Bee	Steam Yacht		Plymouth	United Kingdom	For William Coward.
May	Coriolanus	Clipper	Messrs. Archibald M'Millan & Co.	Dumbarton	United Kingdom	For private owner.
May	Glen Caladh	Barque	Messrs. Dobie & Co.	Govan	United Kingdom	For private owner.
May	Great Britain	Paddle Steamer	Messrs William Simons & Co.	Renfrew	United Kingdom	For private owner.
May	Hinemoa	Lighthouse tender	Scotts Shipbuilding and Engineering Co. Ltd.	Greenock	United Kingdom	For Government of New Zealand.
May	Melita	Yacht	Fyfe	Fife	United Kingdom	For David Tod.
May	Mohave II	Sternwheeler	Patrick Henry Tiernan	San Francisco, California; Port Isabel	United States; Mexico	For Colorado Steam Navigation Company. Built at San Francisco, dismantled and re-erected at Port Isabel.
May	Scotstoun	East Indiaman	Messrs. Charles Connell & Co.	Whiteinch	United Kingdom	For Messrs. William & Alfred Brown & Co.
May	Scottish Hero	Barque	William Doxford & Sons	Sunderland	United Kingdom	For McIlwraith, MacEacharn & Co.
May	Shakespeare	Full-rigged ship	Short Bros.	Sunderland	United Kingdom	For William Anderson.
May	Sheffield	Steamship	Messrs. John Elder & Co.	Fairfield	United Kingdom	For Manchester, Sheffield and Lincolnshire Railway.
May	Sla Snake	Steam yacht	Messrs. J. & G. Thomson	Dalmuir	United Kingdom	For James Galbraith.
May	Willanga	Dredger	Messrs. William Simons & Co.	Renfrew	United Kingdom	For private owner.
5 June	Balaclava	Steamship	Messrs. Aitken & Mansel	Whiteinch	United Kingdom	For Messrs. Newcomb & Thomas.
5 June	Blantyre	Fishing trawler	Edwin Barter	Brixham	United Kingdom	For Kate Dart and Mary Dart.
7 June	Tench Coxe	Cutter	William T. Malster	Baltimore, Maryland	United States	For United States Revenue Marine
8 June	James Beazley	Barque	Osbourne, Graham & Co.	North Hylton	United Kingdom	For William Kelly.
8 June	Redcar	Steamship	Messrs. Raylton, Dixon & Co.	Middlesbrough	United Kingdom	For Messrs. Blair & Co (Limited).
8 June	Scottish Knight	Barque	William Doxford & Sons	Sunderland	United Kingdom	For McIlwraith, MacEacharn & Co.
8 June	Trojan	Merchantman		Totnes	United Kingdom	For Mr. Fowle.
9 June	Beemah	Barque	Messrs. William Hamilton & Co.	Port Glasgow	United Kingdom	For Messrs. J. H. Johnson & Co.
9 June	Eastminster	Clipper	Messrs. John Reid & Co.	Port Glasgow	United Kingdom	For Messrs. Berryman & Turnbull.
9 June	Princess Royal	Steamship	London and Glasgow Shipbuilding Co.	Govan	United Kingdom	For Messrs. M. Langlands & Sons.
10 June	Manaro	Steamship	Messrs. Russell & Co.	Port Glasgow	United Kingdom	For Illawarra Steam Navigation Co.
10 June	Nelson	Steamship	Messrs. Blackwood & Gordon	Port Glasgow	United Kingdom	For Warrambool Steam Navigation Co.
13 June	Koputai	Paddle tug	Messrs. Thomas Wingate & Co.	Whiteinch	United Kingdom	For John Darling.
17 June	J. S. Wright	Merchantman	Joseph Jeffrey	Yarmouth	Canada	For Nathaniel Churchill.
17 June	Prinz Adalbert	Leipzig-class corvette	AG Vulcan	Stettin	Germany	For Kaiserliche Marine.
19 June	Esmerelda	Cutter	Edwin Barter	Brixham	United Kingdom	For Baron Churston.
19 June	Japara	Steamship	Messrs. Caird & Co.	Greenock	United Kingdom	For Nederlandse Indische Stoomvaart Maatschappij.
20 June	Olaf Trygveson	Steamship	Messrs. J. Wigham, Richardson & Co.	Walker	United Kingdom	For private owner.
21 June	Lottie	Fishing smack	John Hadfield	Grimsby	United Kingdom	For John Haylock.
22 June	Empress of India	Sailing barge	J. W. Curtis	Ipswich	United Kingdom	For C. Andrews and J. Baker.
22 June	Shenir	Merchantman	Messrs. Alexander Stephen & Sons	Linthouse	United Kingdom	For John Smith.
23 June	Theda	Schooner	R. A. Prichard	Pwllheli	United Kingdom	For Griffith Jones.
24 June	Ben Nevis	Steam lighter	Abercorn Shipbuilding Co	Paisley	United Kingdom	For Messrs. G. Ferguson & Co.
24 June	Vénézuéla	Steamship	Forges et Chantiers de la Méditerranée	Le Havre	France	For: Cie. Générale Transatlantique
24 June	Fervent	Steamship	Short Bros.	Pallion	United Kingdom	For J. Westoll.
24 June	Gem	Paddle steamer	Air & Westergaard	Moama	New South Wales	For Elliot Charles Rendell.
24 June	Marlborough	Merchantman	Messrs. Robert Duncan & Co.	Port Glasgow	United Kingdom	For Messrs. Patrick Henderson & Co.
24 June	Trio	Steamship	Messrs. John Coulson & Co	Newcastle upon Tyne	United Kingdom	For Messrs. Fisher, Harbron & Renwick.
24 June	Triton	Steamship	Messrs. Pearse, Lockwood & Co.	Stockton-on-Tees	United Kingdom	For R. C. Denton.
24 June	Wrestler	Paddle tug	Messrs. W. H. Potter & Co.	Liverpool	United Kingdom	For Liverpool Steamtug Co.
27 June	Vesper	Steamship	Messrs. Black & Noble	Montrose	United Kingdom	For Montros and Newcastle Steam Shipping Co.
29 June	City of Grafton	Paddle steamer	Messrs. Alexander Stephen & Sons	Linthouse	United Kingdom	For private owner.
June	Eastminster	Full-rigged ship		Port Glasgow	United Kingdom	For E. W. Berryman.
June	Jessore	Full-rigged ship	Messrs. Richardson, Duck & Co.	South Stockton	United Kingdom	For Messrs. Eyre, Evans & Co.
June	Marlborough	full-rigged ship	Robert Duncan & Co.	Port Glasgow	United Kingdom	For John Leslie.
June	Kirkloch	Barque	William Doxford & Sons	Sunderland	United Kingdom	For J. Steel.
10 July	Admiral	Pilot cutter	Dry Dock Co.	Newport	United Kingdom	For William Jukes.
6 July	Wespe	Wespe-class gunboat	AG Weser	Bremen	Germany	For Kaiserliche Marine.
20 July	Royalist	Barquentine	W. Harkness	Middlesbrough	United Kingdom	For Messrs. T. A. Bulmer & Co.
21 July	Irish Girl	Merchantman	John Cormick	Dundalk	United Kingdom	For private owner.
21 July	Uller	Vale-class gunboat	Karljohansvern	Horten	Norway	For Royal Norwegian Navy.
22 July	Nunthorpe	Paddle tug	J. T. Eltringham	South Shields	United Kingdom	For North Eastern Railway.
22 July	Saint Mirren	East Indiaman	Messrs. Richardson, Duck & Co.	South Stockton-on-Tees	United Kingdom	For Messrs. Rankin, Gilmour & Co.
22 July	The Manelope	Clipper	Messrs. Bowdler, Chaffer & Co.	Seacombe	United Kingdom	For Messrs. J. Heap & Son.
22 July	Thurland Castle	Sailing ship	Harland & Wolff	Belfast	United Kingdom	For Lancaster Shipowners Company (Limited).
22 July	Winthorpe	Steamship	William Gray & Co.	West Hartlepool	United Kingdom	For Mr. Fisher.
24 July	Horsley	Steamship	Messrs. Edward Withy & Co.	Middleton	United Kingdom	For John Horsley.
24 July	Sarco	Barque	Messrs. Pearse & Co.	Stockton-on-Tees	United Kingdom	For private owner.
July	Hotspur	Paddle tug	Messrs. William Hamilton & Co.	Port Glasgow	United Kingdom	For E. Griffiths, Brother & Co.
July	May	Schooner	R. Craggs & Son	Middlesbrough	United Kingdom	For R. Craggs & Son.
5 August	Osprey	Osprey-class sloop		Sheerness Dockyard	United Kingdom	For Royal Navy.
8 August	Belle of Arvon	Barque	Osbourne, Graham & Co	Hylton	United Kingdom	For Messrs. Thomas, Griffith & Co.
9 August	Ruby	Emerald-class corvette	Earle's Shipbuilding	Hull	United Kingdom	For Royal Navy.
10 August	Kent's Bank	Full-rigged ship	Barrow Ship Building Co. Ltd.	Barrow-in-Furness	United Kingdom	For J. B. Sprott.
18 August	Emerald	Emerald-class corvette		Pembroke Dockyard	United Kingdom	For Royal Navy.
18 August	Tempête	Coastal defence ship	Arsenal de Brest	Brest	France	For French Navy.
19 August	Criccieth Castle	Brig	Mr. Owen	Borth	United Kingdom	For Mr. Owen.
19 August	Her Majesty	Paddle tug	Messrs. W. Allsup & Sons	Preston	United Kingdom	For Messrs. Martin & Constance.
19 August	Leading Chief	Schooner	William Kinloch	Kingston on Spey	United Kingdom	For Messrs. Kinloch and partners.
19 August	Wolviston	Steamship	Messrs. Edward Withy & Co.	Hartlepool	United Kingdom	For West Hartlepool Steam Navigation Co.
21 August	Enterprise	Merchantman	William Newall	Ellesmere Port	United Kingdom	For private owner.
21 August	Oscar	Paddle tug	George Butchard	Gravesend	United Kingdom	For Black Ball Towing Co.
22 August	Flying Scud	Steamship	Neath Abbey Ironworks Co.	Neath	United Kingdom	For private owner.
23 August	Annamite	Transport ship		Cherbourg	France	For French Navy.
23 August	Thomas Corwin	Steam cutter	Oregon Iron Works	Albina, Oregon	United States	For United States Revenue Marine.
August	Arvonia	Full-rigged ship	Mounsey & Foster	Sunderland	United Kingdom	For Arvon Shipping Co. Ltd.
August	Cairsmuir	Steamship		Govan	United Kingdom	For Charles Williamson.
August	Great Western	Paddle dredger	W. Simons & Co.	Renfrew	United Kingdom	For Messrs. W. & T. Jolliffe & Co.
August	Letterfourie	Merchantman		Garmouth	United Kingdom	For private owner.
1 September	Ingolf	Gunboat	Orlogsværftet	Copenhagen	Denmark	For Royal Danish Navy.
2 September	Camellia	Schooner	Albion Shipbuilding	Landport	United Kingdom	For Mr. Crampton.
4 September	Jingei	Paddle steamer	Yokosuka Naval Arsenal	Yokosuka	Japan	For Imperial Japanese Navy.
5 September	Nyanza	Schooner	A. Spence	Garmouth	United Kingdom	For A. Spence and others.
5 September	Tudor	Steamship	Messrs. John Key & Sons	Kinghorn	United Kingdom	For John Bacon.
5 September	Vellore	Merchantman	Messrs. Richardson, Duck & Co.	Stockton-on-Tees	United Kingdom	For Messrs. Eyre, Evans & Co.
6 September	Dunrobin	Tug	Messrs. Gunn Bros.	Cardiff	United Kingdom	For Messrs. White, Edmonds & Jenkins.
6 September	Winston	Steamship	William Gray & Co.	West Hartlepool	United Kingdom	For West Hartlepool Steam Navigation Company.
7 September	Glenmore	Barque	Messrs. A. M'Millan & Son	Dumbarton	United Kingdom	For William Porter.
7 September	Pleiad	Barque	Messrs. Bowdler, Chaffer & Co.	Seacombe	United Kingdom	For James Newton.
18 September	Redoutable	Battleship	Arsenal de Lorient	Lorient	France	For French Navy. First warship principally constructed of steel.
18 September	Theresina	Steamship	Messrs. Raylton, Dixon & Co.	Middlesbrough-on-Tees	United Kingdom	For Messrs. Fawcett, Preston & Co.
19 September	Edward Seymour	Brigantine	Messrs. Willia, & Owen	Portmadoc	United Kingdom	For Lewis Hughes.
19 September	Mary Claaseu	Brig	John Jones	Borth	United Kingdom	For Owen Evans and others.
19 September	Rigault de Genouilly	Rigault de Genouilly-class cruiser	Arsenal de Brest	Brest	France	For French Navy.
20 September	Fair Wind	Schooner	John Watson	Banff	United Kingdom	For private owner.
20 September	Shildon	Steamship	Whitehall Shipbuilding	Whitby	United Kingdom	For Messrs. George Pyrman & Co.
22 September	Tagus	Steamship	Messrs. Bowdler & Chaffer	Seacombe	United Kingdom	For Messrs. Leyland & Co.
23 September	Richard Fisher	Schooner	Paul Rodgers	Carrickfergus	United Kingdom	For Messrs. John Wignell & Co.
30 September	Victorian	Steamship	Messrs. D. & W. Henderson	Meadowside	United Kingdom	For Adelaide Steamship Co.
September	Ann	Steamship	Messrs. A. & J. Inglis	Pointhouse	United Kingdom	For Messrs. J. Burnett & Sons.
Unknown date	Castelia	Schooner	Philip Bellot	Gorey	(United Kingdom of Great Britain and Ireland) Jersey	For Philip Le Mesurier.
September	Clan Ferguson	Merchantman	Messrs. John Reid & Co.	Port Glasgow	United Kingdom	For Thomas Dunlop.
September	Corsewall	Steamship	Messrs. Steele	Greenock	United Kingdom	For Clyde Shipping Co.
September	County of Caithness	East Indiaman	Messrs. Barclay, Curle & Co.	Whiteinch	United Kingdom	For Messrs. R. & J. Craig.
September	Earl Derby	Barque	Messrs. Robert Duncan & Co.	Port Glasgow	United Kingdom	For J. M'Alister & Sons.
September	Edith Godden	Steamship	Messrs. A. & J. Inglis	Pointhouse	United Kingdom	For Messrs. W. Godden & Sons.
September	Emu	Steamship	Messrs. Blackwood & Gordon	Port Glasgow	United Kingdom	For private owner.
September	Glenmure	Barque	Messrs. A. M'Millan & Sons	Dumbarton	United Kingdom	For William Porter.
September	Hirondelle	Steamship	Messrs. Murdoch & Murray	Port Glasgow	United Kingdom	For Messrs. Matthew, Paul & Co.
September	Hogarth	Steamship	Messrs. Cunliffe & Dunlop	Port Glasgow	United Kingdom	For Aberdeen and London Steam Navigation Co.
September	Inchmarnock	Barque	Messrs. D. & W. Henderson	Meadowside	United Kingdom	For Clutha Shipping Co.
September	Largs	Barque	Messrs. A. M'Millan & Sons	Dumbarton	United Kingdom	For Messrs. R. Douglas & Son.
September	Pleione	Merchantman	Messrs. Alexander Stephen & Sons	Govan	United Kingdom	For Messrs. Shaw, Savill & Co.
September	Rollo	Merchantman	Messrs. Dobie & Co.	Govan	United Kingdom	For private owner.
September	Rotorua	Steamship	Messrs. William Denny & Bros.	Dumbarton	United Kingdom	For New Zealand Steam Shipping Co.
September	Star of the East	Barque	Messrs. Charles Connell & Co.	Scotstoun	United Kingdom	For Messrs. Peter Smith & Sons.
September	Thalia	Merchantman	Messrs. John Elder & Co.	Govan	United Kingdom	For Messrs. Worman Bros.
September	Viper	Wespe-class gunboat	AG Vulcan	Bremen	Germany	For Kaiserliche Marine.
3 October	Medway	Medina-class gunboat	Messrs. Palmers	Jarrow	United Kingdom	For Royal Navy.
3 October	Sabrina	Medina-class gunboat	Messrs. Palmers	Jarrow	United Kingdom	For Royal Navy.
3 October	Caravane	Transport	Arsenal de Lorient	Lorient	France	For French Navy.
4 October	Lochinvar	Barque	Messrs. Alexander Stephen & Sons	Linthouse	United Kingdom	For Messrs. Joseph Boumphrey & Co.
4 October	Mary Hough	Steamship	Messrs. Lobnitz, Goulborn & Co	Renfrew	United Kingdom	For Samuel Hough.
5 October	Allegiance	Full-rigged ship	Messrs. W. H. Potter & Co.	Liverpool	United Kingdom	For David Morgan.
5 October	Earlshall	Barque	William Bruce Thompson	Dundee	United Kingdom	For Job Bros. & Co. Ltd.
5 October	Loch Fyne	Clipper	Messrs. James & George Thompson	Dalmuir	United Kingdom	For Messrs. Aitken, Lilburn & Co.
5 October	Pearl	Paddle ferry	Messrs. Edwards & Symes	Cubitt Town	United Kingdom	For Thames Steam Ferry Company.
5 October	The British Enterprise	Merchantman	Messrs. Richardson, Duck & Co.	South Stockton	United Kingdom	For British Shipowners Co.
5 October	Zamora	Clipper	Messrs. Birrell, Stenhouse & Co.	Dumbarton	United Kingdom	For L. Macpherson.
6 October	Alrune	Steamship	Messrs. Aitken & Mansel	Whiteinch	United Kingdom	For Messrs. J. T. Salvesen & Co.
9 October	Eliza	Barquentine	James E. Scott	Cartsdyke	United Kingdom	For Messrs. Goodyear & Co.
16 October	Ardenclutha	East Indiaman	Messrs. Alexander Stephen & Sons	Linthouse	United Kingdom	For James L. Mitchell.
18 October	Corby	Full-rigged ship	Messrs. Bowdler, Chaffer & Co.	Seacombe	United Kingdom	For Corinthian Shipping Co., or R. Nicholson & Sons.
18 October	Eslington	Steamship	Messrs. Schlesinger, Davis & Co.	Wallsend	United Kingdom	For J. H. Wilson.
19 October	Bacchante	Bacchante-class corvette		Portsmouth Dockyard	United Kingdom	For Royal Navy.
19 October	Benarty	Steamship	Messrs. Barclay, Curle & Co.	Whiteinch	United Kingdom	For Messrs. William Thompson & Co.
19 October	Comet	Tug	Messrs. J. & M. Gunn	Cardiff	United Kingdom	For Great Yarmouth Star Steam Co.
19 October	Loudoun Castle	Steamship	Messrs. James & George Yhjompson	Clydebank	United Kingdom	For Castle Line.
19 October	William Ashburner	Schooner	William Ashburner	Barrow-in-Furness	United Kingdom	For Thomas Ashburner.
20 October	Hercules	Smack	Messrs. Hunt	Slaughden	United Kingdom	For H. H. Fryman.
20 October	Robert	Schooner	Carnegie & Matthew	Peterhead	United Kingdom	For R. B. Hutchieson.
21 October	Adain Smith	Merchantman	Messrs. Henry Murray & Co.	Port Glasgow	United Kingdom	For Kirkcaldy and London Steamship Co.
21 October	Mercury	Steamship	Messrs. Henry Murray & Co.	Port Glasgow	United Kingdom	For Messrs. J. & P. Hutchison.
21 October	Newark	Clipper	Messrs. Robert Duncan & Co.	Port Glasgow	United Kingdom	For James Moffat.
24 October	Portland	Steamship	Messrs. Robert Steele & Co.	Greenock	United Kingdom	For Clyde Shipping Co.
31 October	Lady Frances	Steamship	William Gray & Co.	West Hartlepool	United Kingdom	For Mr. Morton-Middleton.
October	Adam Smith	Steamship	Messrs. Henry Murray & Co.	Port Glasgow	United Kingdom	For Kirkcaldy and London Steamship Co.
October	Forward	Schooner		Peterhead	United Kingdom	For private owner.
October	Imbat	Steamship	London & Glasgow Shipbuilding Co.	Govan	United Kingdom	For Messrs. R. W. Cousens & Co.
October	Lochnivar	Merchantman	Messrs. Stephen & Sons	Linthouse	United Kingdom	For private owner.
October	Nairnshire	Merchantman	Messrs. Dobie & Co.	Govan	United Kingdom	For Messrs. Thomas Law & Co.
October	North Carolina	Barque	Messrs. A. M'Millan & Son	Dumbarton	United Kingdom	For Messrs. Paton, Vicars & Co.
October	Tay	Medina-class gunboat	Messrs. Palmers	Newcastle upon Tyne	United Kingdom	For Royal Navy.
October	Tees	Medina-class gunboat	Messrs. Palmers	Newcastle upon Tyne	United Kingdom	For Royal Navy.
2 November	Balmoral Castle	Steamship	Robert Napier and Sons	Govan	United Kingdom	For Castle Line.
3 November	Carnegie	Clipper	Messrs. John Reid & Co.	Port Glasgow	United Kingdom	For James Moffat.
4 November	Algerian	Steamship	Messrs. Bowdler, Chaffer & Co.	Seacombe	United Kingdom	For Messrs. Frederick Leyland & Co.
4 November	Armstrong	Steamship	builder	Sunderland	United Kingdom	For James Wait.
4 November	Greenock	Hopper dredger	Messrs. W. Simons & Co.	Renfrew	United Kingdom	For Greenock Harbour Trustees.
4 November	Kinsembo	Steamship	Messrs. Cunliffe & Dunlop	Port Glasgow	United Kingdom	For British and African Steam Navigation Co.
4 November	Nelson	Nelson-class cruiser	Elder & Company	Glasgow	United Kingdom	For Royal Navy
4 November	Serapis	Clipper	James E. Scott	Cartsdyke	United Kingdom	For William Lund.
4 November	Sicily	Steamship	Messrs. Laird Bros.	Birkenhead	United Kingdom	For David MacIver.
4 November	Tucimirari	Steamship	Messrs. Black & Noble	Montrose	United Kingdom	For Tasmania Steam Navigation Co.
6 November	Atjeh	Atjeh-class cruiser	Rijkswerf	Amsterdam	Netherlands	For Royal Netherlands Navy.
9 November	Trident	Colbert-class ironclad	Arsenal de Toulon	Toulon	France	For French Navy.
12 November	Prometheus	Steamship	Joseph L. Thompson & Sons	Sunderland	United Kingdom	For Alexander Smith & Co.
14 November	Mousmie	Yacht	Harland & Wolff	Belfast	United Kingdom	For P. O'Connor.
14 November	Opawa	Merchantman	Messrs. Alexander Stephen & Sons	Linthouse	United Kingdom	For New Zealand Shipping Co.
14 November	Richard Anning	Steamship	Messrs. Raylton, Dixon & Co.	Middlesbrough	United Kingdom	For J. H. Anning.
16 November	Imbros	Steamship	Messrs. Richardson, Duck & Co	South Stockton-on-Tees	United Kingdom	For Messrs. Henry Briggs, Sons, & Co.
16 November	Inch Kenneth	Merchantman	Messrs. David & William Henderson & Co.	Meadowside	United Kingdom	For Clutha Shipping Co.
18 November	Northampton	Nelson-class cruiser	Napiers	Glasgow	United Kingdom	For Royal Navy.
20 November	Drumclog	Merchantman	Messrs. William Hamilton & Co.	Port Glasgow	United Kingdom	For private owner.
20 November	Loch Long	Clipper	Messrs. James & George Thomson	Dalmuir	United Kingdom	For Messrs. Aitken, Lilburne & Co.
20 November	Rotomahana	Steamship	Fraser & Tinne	Auckland	New Zealand	For Fraser & Tinne.
21 November	Victor	Fishing smack	George Brown	Hull	United Kingdom	For .
30 November	Diana	Steamship	Messrs. Aitken & Mansel	Partick	United Kingdom	For London and South Western Railway.
November	Ariadne	Merchantman	Messrs. Scott & Co.	Greenock	United Kingdom	For James J. Grieve.
November	Bessie Jose	Barque	Messrs. Birrell, Stenhouse & Co.	Dumbarton	United Kingdom	For J. Jose.
November	Corina	Barque	Messrs. Birrell, Stenhouse & Co.	Dumbarton	United Kingdom	For L. Macpherson and others.
November	East Lothian	Merchantman	Messrs. Charles Connell & Co.	Scotstoun	United Kingdom	For James Boyd.
November	Frid	Brig			Norway	For private owner.
November	Kinclune	Merchantman	Messrs. Alexander Stephen & Sons	Govan	United Kingdom	For Mr. Cooper.
November	Larne	Steamship	Messrs. J. Fullarton & Co.	Merksworth	United Kingdom	For private owner.
November	Loch Long	Merchantman	Messrs. J. & G. Thomson	Dalmuir	United Kingdom	For General Shipping Co.
November	Lord Derby	Tug	J. T. Eltringham	South Shields	United Kingdom	For Stanley Tug Co.
November	Oban Bay	Merchantman	Messrs. Dobie & Co.	Govan	United Kingdom	For Messrs. Hatfield, Cameron & Co.
November	Radnorshire	Steamship	London and Glasgow Shipbuilding Co.	Govan	United Kingdom	For Messrs. D. J. Jenkins & Co.
November	Smyrna	Barque	Messrs. Walter Hood & Co.	Aberdeen	United Kingdom	For George Thompson Jr.
2 December	Letterewe	Barque	Messrs. W. H. Potter & Co.	Liverpool	United Kingdom	For Messrs. Dixon, Irwin & Co.
2 December	Lizzie	Steamship	Messrs. Turnbull & Son	Whitby	United Kingdom	For Messrs. James Gray & Co.
2 December	Natal	Barque	Messrs. Hall & Co.	Aberdeen	United Kingdom	For private owner.
2 December	Steelfield	Sailing ship	Harland & Wolff	Belfast	United Kingdom	For R. C. McNaughton & Co.
5 December	Conovium	Schooner	Thomas Jones	Aberystwyth	United Kingdom	For William Jones.
5 December	Loch Linnhe	Merchantman	Messrs. James & George Thomson	Clydebank	United Kingdom	For Messrs. J. & R. Wilson.
5 December	Menam	Paddle tug	Messrs. Cunliffe & Dunlop	Port Glasgow	United Kingdom	For Borneo Company.
5 December	Miantonomoh	Monitor	John Roach and Son	Chester, Pennsylvania	United States	For United States Navy.
5 December	Piako	Merchantman	Messrs. Alexander Stephen & Sons	Linthouse	United Kingdom	For New Zealand Shipping Company.
11 December	Carlisle	Smack		Great Yarmouth	United Kingdom	For Thomas Lindsey.
12 December	Petrel	Steamship	Messrs. Hall, Russell & Co.	Aberdeen	United Kingdom	For General Steam Navigation Company.
13 December	Earl of Beaconsfield	Paddle tug	J. P. Rennoldson	South Shields	United Kingdom	For W. H. Martin.
13 December	Flamingo	Condor-class gunvessel		Devonport Dockyard	United Kingdom	For Royal Navy.
14 December	Flying Foam	Tug	Messrs. Murdoch & Murray	Port Glasgow	United Kingdom	For Clyde Shipping Co.
14 December	Léon	Steamship	Messrs. Alexander Stephen & Sons	Linthouse	United Kingdom	For MM. Chevilotte Frères.
16 December	Eskbank	Barque	Messrs. Dobie & Co.	Govan	United Kingdom	For Messrs. George, Gray, Macfarlane & Co.
16 December	Griffon	Condor-class gunvessel	Messrs. Laird Bros.	Birkenhead	United Kingdom	For Royal Navy.
16 December	Hewett	Steamship	Messrs. M. Pearse & Co.	Stockton-on-Tees	United Kingdom	For private owner.
21 December	Bretagne	Steamship	Forges et Chantiers de la Méditerranée	La Seyne	France	For: Soc. Générale de Transports Maritimes à Vapeur
28 December	Condor	Condor-class gunvessel		Devonport Dockyard	United Kingdom	For Royal Navy.
December	Bheinn Bharam	Schooner	Irvine Shipbuilding Co.	Irvine	United Kingdom	For Alexander M'Millan.
December	Evelyn	Steamship	William Gray & Co.	West Hartlepool	United Kingdom	For Messrs. Merryweather, Coverdale & Todd.
Unknown date	Acklam	Steamship	Messrs. Raylton, Dixon & Co.	Middlesbrough	United Kingdom	For private owner.
Unknown date	Acme	Schooner	Edward Davis	Brisbane Water	New South Wales	For Edward Davis & David Copper.
Unknown date	Adventure	Lifting vessel	Messrs. W. H. Potter & Co	Liverpool	United Kingdom	For Mersey Docks and Harbour Board.
Unknown date	Alne Holme	Steamship	Joseph L. Thompson	Sunderland	United Kingdom	For Hine Bros.
Unknown date	Alpha	Fishing trawler	Bell & Trolley	Grimsby	United Kingdom	For John Trolley.
Unknown date	Amaryllis	Catamaran			United States	For Nathanael Greene Herreshoff.
Unknown date	Anna Karoline	Jekt			Norway	For private owner.
Unknown date	Arabella	Merchantman	Bartram, Haswell & Co.	Sunderland	United Kingdom	For T. E. Hick.
Unknown date	Archer	Barque	Robert Thompson Jr.	Sunderland	United Kingdom	For P. Iredald.
Unknown date	Ares	Barque		Whiteinch	United Kingdom	For Hugh Barton.
Unknown date	Argentina	Steamship	Thomas Brassey & Co.	Birkenhead	United Kingdom	For M. Susanis.
Unknown date	Argo	Merchantman	J. Gardner	Sunderland	United Kingdom	For R. Humble.
Unknown date	Ariel	Steamboat	W. Allsup & Sons	Preston	United Kingdom	For private owner.
Unknown date	Augustine	Barque		Cardigan Bridge	United Kingdom	For Messrs. A. A. Macdonald Brothers.
Unknown date	Aurora	Whaler	Alexander Stephen & Sons Ltd.	Dundee	United Kingdom	For Dundee Seal and Whale Fishing Co.
Unknown date	Ayton	Collier	Short Bros.	Sunderland	United Kingdom	For Barwick & Co.
Unknown date	Beech Holm	Merchantman	James Laing	Sunderland	United Kingdom	For R. H. Gayner
Unknown date	Belle	Steamship	J. E. Scott	Cartsdyle	United Kingdom	For private owner.
Unknown date	Bhotan	Full-rigged ship	Robert Thompson Jr.	Sunderland	United Kingdom	For E. Bates & Sons.
Unknown date	Blagdon	Merchantman	Joseph L. Thompson	Sunderland	United Kingdom	For Arkless, Bell & Co.
Unknown date	Bon Accord	Barque	J. Crown	Sunderland	United Kingdom	For J. Hossack.
Unknown date	Boreas	Merchantman	Messrs. W. H. Potter & Co.	Liverpool	United Kingdom	For Alfred Holt.
Unknown date	Brier Holme	Barque	Joseph L. Thompson	Sunderland	United Kingdom	For Hine Bros.
Unknown date	Carmelo	Barque	Austin & Hunter	Sunderland	United Kingdom	For G. J. Hay.
Unknown date	Carnarvonshire	Merchantman	Messrs. Thomas Royden & Sons	Liverpool	United Kingdom	For Messrs. Hughes & Co.
Unknown date	Celia	Merchantman	William Pickersgill	Sunderland	United Kingdom	For W. C. Jarvis.
Unknown date	Champion of the Seas	Merchantman	Short Bros	Sunderland	United Kingdom	For J. Shearer.
Unknown date	Charles Cotesworth	Full-rigged ship	Messrs. Thomas Royden & Sons	Liverpool	United Kingdom	For Messrs. Cotesworth, Lyne & Co.
Unknown date	Chefoo	Steamship	Scotts Shipbuilding and Engineering Co. Ltd.	Greenock	United Kingdom	For China Navigation Co. Ltd.
Unknown date	Chilena	Merchantman	William Doxford & Sons	Sunderland	United Kingdom	For Tomlinson, Hodgett & Co.
Unknown date	Commonwealth	Merchantman	William Doxford & Sons	Sunderland	United Kingdom	For Day & Farlan.
Unknown date	Corsair	Merchantman	Blumer & Co.	Sunderland	United Kingdom	For Turner, Edwards & Co.
Unknown date	Daisy	Schooner	Messrs. R. Craggs & Son	Middlesbrough-on-Tees	United Kingdom	For private owner.
Unknown date	Dawn	Merchantman	W. F. Pile	Sunderland	United Kingdom	For Pile & Co.
Unknown date	Daybreak	Steamship	Messrs. E. Withy & Co.	West Hartlepool	United Kingdom	For private owner.
Unknown date	Drift	Schooner			United States	For United States Coast Survey.
Unknown date	Dronningen	Paddle steamer	Messrs. Raylton, Dixon & Co.	Middlesbrough	United Kingdom	For private owner.
Unknown date	Eildenhope	Steamship	William Gray & Co.	West Hartlepool	United Kingdom	For private owner.
Unknown date	Elwy	Barque	Messrs. Thomas Royden & Sons	Liverpool	United Kingdom	For Messrs. Jones, Thomas & Co.
Unknown date	Emily	Merchantman	A. Simey & Co	Sunderland	United Kingdom	For T. Kish et al.
Unknown date	Emily A. Davies	Merchantman	Joseph L. Thompson	Sunderland	United Kingdom	For J. Davies.
Unknown date	Enterprise	Lifting vessel	Messrs. W. H. Potter & Co	Liverpool	United Kingdom	For Mersey Docks and Harbour Board.
Unknown date	Erasmus Wilson	Steamship	Messrs. E. Withy & Co.	West Hartlepool	United Kingdom	For private owner.
Unknown date	Ernest	Smack	Edwin Barter	Brixham	United Kingdom	For Thomas Rolstone.
Unknown date	Euras	Merchantman	Messrs. W. H. Potter & Co.	Liverpool	United Kingdom	For Alfred Holt.
Unknown date	Everham Abbey	Full-rigged ship	Messrs. Thomas Royden & Sons	Liverpool	United Kingdom	For Messrs. James Poole & Co.
Unknown date	Fenton	Steamship	Austin & Hunter	Sunderland	United Kingdom	For W. Milnes.
Unknown date	Fido	Barquentine	C. H. Christensen	Arendal	Norway	For private owner.
Unknown date	Flintshire	Merchantman	Messrs. Thomas Royden & Sons	Liverpool	United Kingdom	For Messrs. Hughes & Co.
Unknown date	Fly	Barge	Bewley, Webb & Co.	Dublin	United Kingdom	For Grand Canal Company.
Unknown date	Garron Tower	Steamship	Messrs. E. Withy & Co.	West Hartlepool	United Kingdom	For private owner.
Unknown date	G. B. S.	Full-rigged ship	Joseph L. Thompson	Sunderland	United Kingdom	For G. B. Sully.
Unknown date	Gemini	Fishing trawler	Edwin Barter	Brixham	United Kingdom	For John Elliott & Thomas Williams.
Unknown date	Gladiator	Tug			United States	For private owner.
Unknown date	Glandinorwig	Barque	William Doxford & Sons	Sunderland	United Kingdom	For W. E. Jones.
Unknown date	Glendovey	Barque	James Laing	Sunderland	United Kingdom	For William James & N. Boath.
Unknown date	Goatfell	Merchantman	J. E. Scott	Cartsdyle	United Kingdom	For private owner.
Unknown date	Golden Sunset	Barque	J. Blumer & Co.	Sunderland	United Kingdom	For Henry Beynon & Co.
Unknown date	Groper	Dredger	Thomas Wingate & Co.	Whiteinch	United Kingdom	For Queensland Government.
Unknown date	Gwendoline	Steamship	Messrs. Raylton, Dixon & Co.	Middlesbrough	United Kingdom	For private owner.
Unknown date	Hallamshire	Steamship	Messrs. E. Withy & Co.	West Hartlepool	United Kingdom	For private owner.
Unknown date	Han Kwang	Steamship	Messrs. Laird Bros.	Birkenhead	United Kingdom	For private owner.
Unknown date	Hesleden	Steamship	William Gray & Co.	West Hartlepool	United Kingdom	For private owner.
Unknown date	Hiawatha	Fishing trawler	Edwin Barter	Brixham	United Kingdom	For Edwin Barter.
Unknown date	Hisber	Gunboat		Golden Horn	Ottoman Empire	For Ottoman Navy.
Unknown date	Inchgreen	Barque	Caird & Company	Greenock	United Kingdom	For W Lindsay & Co.
Unknown date	Ireshope	Steamship	William Gray & Co.	West Hartlepool	United Kingdom	For private owner.
Unknown date	Joseph Pease	Steamship	Messrs. M. Pearse & Co.	Middlesbrough	United Kingdom	For private owner.
Unknown date	Kaisteur	Steamship	Messrs. E. Withy & Co.	West Hartlepool	United Kingdom	For private owner.
Unknown date	Kate Fawcett	Steamship	Messrs. E. Withy & Co.	West Hartlepool	United Kingdom	For private owner.
Unknown date	Kentish Tar	Merchantman	Richard Thompson	Sunderland	United Kingdom	For G. Simpson & Co.
Unknown date	Kezia Harrison	Schooner	W. Harkess	Middlesbrough	United Kingdom	For A. J. Harrison.
Unknown date	Lady Kilmarnock	Merchantman	J. Gardner	Sunderland	United Kingdom	For A. Hay & Co.
Unknown date	La Felguera	Steamship	Messrs. Raylton, Dixon & Co.	Middlesbrough	United Kingdom	For private owner.
Unknown date	Lalla Rookh	Barque	R. & J. Evans & Co.	Liverpool	United Kingdom	For E. C. Friend & Co.
Unknown date	Lanoma	Barque	Austin & Hunter	Sunderland	United Kingdom	For Thomas Boss Walker.
Unknown date	La Querida	Merchantman	William Doxford & Sons	Sunderland	United Kingdom	For Tomlinson, Hodgett & Co.
30 November	Lastingham	Steamship	William Gray & Co.	West Hartlepool	United Kingdom	For private owner.
Unknown date	Lightning	Torpedo boat	John Isaac Thornycroft	Chiswick	United Kingdom	For Royal Navy.
Unknown date	Lorraine	Merchantman	William Doxford & Sons	Sunderland	United Kingdom	For J. Lidgett & Co.
Unknown date	Lucy Compton	Schooner		Willington on Tyne	United Kingdom	For Charles Tully & Co.
January 11	Maipu	Barque	Chantiers de la Roque sur Gironde	Bordeaux	France	For MM. A. D. Bordes & Fils
Unknown date	Manchester	Paddle steamer	Goole Engineering & Shipbuilding Company	Goole	United Kingdom	For Manchester, Sheffield and Lincolnshire Railway.
Unknown date	Mangrove	Steamship	Messrs. R. & J. Evans	Liverpool	United Kingdom	For Messrs. Charles Horsfall & Sons.
Unknown date	Mary Emily	Merchantman	William Pickersgill	Sunderland	United Kingdom	For J. Jones & Co.
Unknown date	Melanopa	Merchantman	Messrs. W. H. Potter & Co	Liverpool	United Kingdom	For Messrs. J. Heap & Sons.
Unknown date	Melpomene	Merchantman	Osbourne, Graham & Co	Sunderland	United Kingdom	For J. Scott & Co.
Unknown date	Mercia	Barque	Bartram, Haswell & Co.	Sunderland	United Kingdom	For P. Hick.
Unknown date	Messenger	Sternwheeler		Tumwater	(United States) Washington Territory	For private owner.
Unknown date	Nil Desperandum	Drifter	S. Richards & Co.	Lowestoft	United Kingdom	For private owner.
Unknown date	Notas	Merchantman	Messrs. W. H. Potter & Co.	Liverpool	United Kingdom	For Alfred Holt.
Unknown date	Ocean	Merchantman	Messrs. Raylton, Dixon & Co.	Middlesbrough	United Kingdom	For private owner.
Unknown date	Peer of the Realm	Merchantman	William Doxford & Sons	Sunderland	United Kingdom	For Farlam & Co.
Unknown date	Peterborough	Steamship	Messrs. R. Craggs & Son	Middlesbrough-on-Tees	United Kingdom	For private owner.
Unknown date	President	Tug	John Readhead & Sons Ltd.	South Shields	United Kingdom	For private owner.
Unknown date	Queen of Cambria	Barque	Osbourne, Graham & Co.	Sunderland	United Kingdom	For R. Jones.
Unknown date	Raglan Castle	Barque	Messrs. R. & J. Evans	Liverpool	United Kingdom	For Messrs. Richards, Mills & Co.
Unknown date	Ranger	Gunboat	Harlan & Hollingsworth	Wilmington, Delaware	United States	For United States Navy.
Unknown date	Red Gauntlet	Schooner	Charles W. Aubin	Jersey	(United Kingdom of Great Britain and Ireland) Jersey	For William Pugsley.
Unknown date	Red Star	Merchantman	Bartram, Haswell & Co.	Sunderland	United Kingdom	For W. Wilkie.
Unknown date	Rossend Castle	Merchantman	Bartram, Haswell & Co.	Sunderland	United Kingdom	For H. t. Mawson.
Unknown date	Rose	Paddle steamer	Cammell Laird	Birkenhead	United Kingdom	For London and North Western Railway.
Unknown date	Sabrina	Merchantman	W. Richardson	Sunderland	United Kingdom	For W. W. Steers & Co.
Unknown date	Sea Mew	Merchantman	George S. Gulston	Sunderland	United Kingdom	For R. Clayton.
Unknown date	Seifi	Gunboat		Golden Horn	Ottoman Empire	For Ottoman Navy.
Unknown date	Shakespearo	Barque	Messrs. R. & J. Evans	Liverpool	United Kingdom	For Messrs. E. C. Friend & Co.
Unknown date	Stanley	Yacht			United Kingdom	For private owner.
Unknown date	Strathairlie	Steamship	Messrs. Raylton, Dixon & Co.	Middlesbrough	United Kingdom	For private owner.
Unknown date	Sylph	Merchantman	Austin & Hunter	Sunderland	United Kingdom	For J. Pile & Co.
Unknown date	Teesdale	Steamship	Messrs. R. Craggs & Son.	location	United Kingdom	For private owner.
Unknown date	Tennie and Laura	Scow	Gunder Jorgenson	Manitowoc, Wisconsin	United States	For Ole Osmondson & Otto A. Bjorkgnist.
Unknown date	T. H. Camp	Tug		Cape Vincent, New York	United States	For Booth Packing Co.
Unknown date	Tsao-kiang	Gunboat	Jiangnan Shipyard	Shanghai	China	For Nanyang Fleet, Imperial Chinese Navy.
Unknown date	Tunstall	Steamship	Short Bros.	Sunderland	United Kingdom	For John S. Barwick.
Unknown date	Vester	Steamship		Boothbay, Maine	United States	For private owner.
Unknown date	Vortigern	Steamship	Messrs. Thomas Royden & Sons	Liverpool	United Kingdom	For W. H. Dixon.
Unknown date	Wanaka	Steamship	Messrs. Thomas Wingate & Co.	Whiteinch	United Kingdom	For Union Steam Ship Company of New Zealand.
Unknown date	Wellington	Paddle tug	George Butchard	Gravesend	United Kingdom	For George Butchard.
Unknown date	West York	Merchantman	William Doxford & Sons	Sunderland	United Kingdom	For T. Thompson.
Unknown date	Woodville	Barque	Messrs. W. H. Potter & Co.	Liverpool	United Kingdom	For J. Nelson.
Unknown date	Yang-woo	Frigate		Shanghai	China	For Imperial Chinese Navy.
Unknown date	No. 80	Steam barge	Baltic Engine Works	Hull	United Kingdom	For Undertakers of the Aire and Calder Navigation.
Unknown date	No. 81	Steam barge	Baltic Engine Works	Hull	United Kingdom	For Undertakers of the Aire and Calder Navigation.
