= SS Madiana =

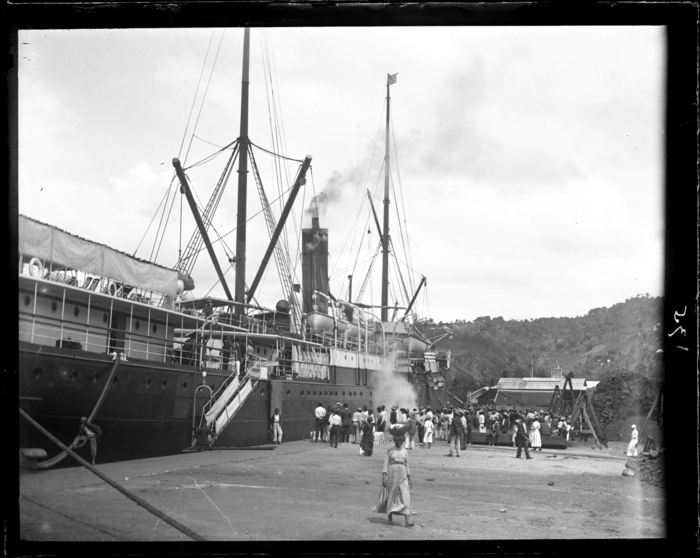
- SS Madiana at dock, St. Lucia, c.1900.

History
- Name: SS Balmoral Castle (1877-1882); SS San Augustin (1882-1886); SS Balmoral Castle (1886-1893); SS Madiana (1893-1903)
- Owner: D. Currie & Co., London (1877-1882); Marques de Campo, Santander (1882-1886); A. Macmillan & Son, London / Glasgow (1886-1887); Balmoral Castle S.S. Co. Ltd. - J. Kilgour, London (1887-1893); Quebec Steamship Co., London (1893-1903)
- Builder: Robert Napier and Sons, Govan
- Yard number: 356
- Launched: 2 November 1876
- Fate: Wrecked on 10 February 1903

General characteristics
- Tonnage: 2,948 gross register tons (GRT); 1,884 net register tons (NRT)
- Length: 344.8 ft (105.1 m)
- Beam: 39.4 ft (12.0 m)
- Depth: 29.1 ft (8.9 m)
- Propulsion: C2cyl (47 & 75 x 48in), 300hp, 1- Screw

SS Madiana was a passenger and cargo steam ship designed and built in the Robert Napier and Sons shipyard in Glasgow in 1877 as SS Balmoral Castle. She was sold several times over the next 20 years, being named SS San Augustin between 1882 and 1886, before reverting to Balmoral Castle. She was finally sold to the Quebec S.S. Company, Ltd. in 1893 and was renamed Madiana.

On 16 December 1883 San Augustin caught fire north of La Coruna while on passage from Manila bound for Liverpool. Her crew abandoned ship, but she stayed afloat and was towed to La Coruna for repairs. She returned to service in June 1885.

On the morning of 10 February 1903, the SS Madiana was approaching Bermuda after a voyage from New York City. She hit the reefs around the island and wrecked. The passengers and crew were able to evacuate the ship without any fatalities.
