= Fido (1876 ship) =

History

New South Wales
- Name: Fido
- Owner: Robert Walker, Sydney
- Builder: C. H. Christensen, Arendal, Norway
- Launched: 1876
- Identification: Sydney Registration No: 39/1897
- Fate: Wrecked in 1898

General characteristics
- Class & type: Barquentine
- Tonnage: 536
- Length: 141.6 feet (43.2 m)
- Beam: 30.9 feet (9.4 m)
- Depth: 17.4 feet (5.3 m)

Fido was a sailing ship built in Norway in 1876. She was wrecked upon Red Head near Nine Mile Beach, New South Wales during a gale on 6 May 1898. Eleven people died.

== Ship ==
Fido was a barque, constructed from wood in 1876 at the Norwegian port of Arendal, by C. H. Christensen and had a length of 141.6 feet (43.2 m), a beam of 30.9 feet (9.4 m) and a depth of 17.4 feet (5.3 m), with a tonnage of 536. She made various intercontinental voyages under the Norwegian flag before being purchased by an Australian syndicate in around 1897. The new owners were a syndicate, headed by the manager of the Karui Timber Company, Robert Walker.

== Loss ==
Fido set sail from the Australian port at Newcastle, New South Wales, on 5 May 1898, bound for Auckland in New Zealand, carrying 710 tons of coal, with no deck cargo. The captain was the 52-year-old S. Morison (or Morrison), an experienced seaman from England who had captained a number of intercontinental trade vessels, accompanied by first mate George Steward and nine other crewmembers. Fido was insured for £1000 at the time of her sailing and was considered by local shipping clerks to be seaworthy and not overloaded at the time. Several other ships set sail at the same time, including the Crown of India and Maitland (ship). The last sighting of Fido was by the Crown of India on the night of 5 May, off Nobbys Head in Newcastle. She never arrived in Auckland and was presumed lost with all 11 crew members believed to have been killed. The Maitland was also lost, while the Crown of India was demasted by the storm.

On 14 June 1898, parts of the Fido were discovered ashore on Nine Mile Beach south of Newcastle. A 6 feet (1.8 m) board bearing the word Fido was found, along with another section of board with the letters TVED. It was reported that these letters formed part of a longer board which had read Fido, followed by a diamond and then the name of the Norwegian port of Tvedestrand.

In July 1898, the Newcastle Marine Board held an inquiry into the ship's loss. The inquiry concluded that Fido was sound, with no evidence that her condition or circumstances were to blame for the loss. The decision was the loss was due to the gale only, and that Fido had likely foundered.
