= Nornen =

Coordinates: 51°16′18″N 3°01′25″W

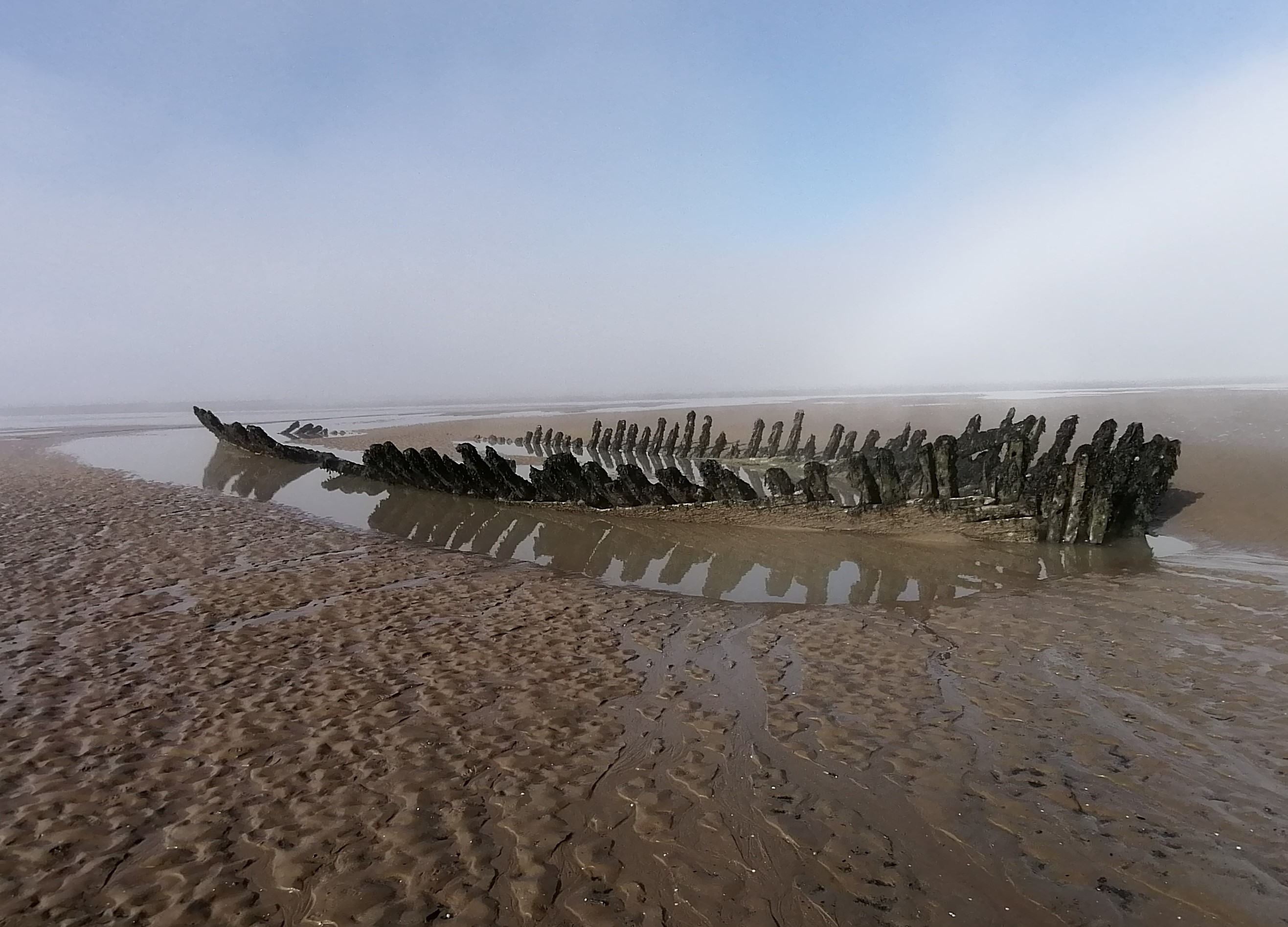

History

France
- Name: Maipu
- Owner: A.D Bordes & Fils
- Launched: 1876
- Fate: Sold

History

Norway
- Name: Nornen
- Owner: Larson Ludwig & co
- Acquired: 1888
- Fate: Wrecked

General characteristics
- Length: 47 m
- Beam: 9 m
- Complement: 13*

The Nornen was a large sailing vessel of the barque type. The three masts were typical of barque ships; the foremast and mainmast square-rigged and the mizzenmast (stern) rigged fore-and-aft. The main mast could be rigged with up to five horizontal yards.

The ship was built and launched in 1876 at Chantiers de la Roque of Bordeaux, France. She was named the Maipu, and ran under the French shipping line A.D Bordes & Fils. The cargo hold could carry ample goods across the Atlantic. Peder Olsen was the captain for her final three years, frequently running trade routes between American east coast ports and Europe.

== Final voyage ==
On 1 February 1897, the Nornen set sail from the Port of Bristol, England, bound for Brunswick, Georgia. Having loaded a cargo of resin and turpentine, she set sail back to Bristol. During the night of 2/3 March, a major storm battered the coasts of south west England. Captain Olsen made an attempt to shelter in the lee of Lundy Island, but this was in vain. With sails torn, the crew were powerless against the rough swells and driving sleet. Other vessels in the Bristol Channel also suffered, and were saved, but the Nornen drifted north-westward, eventually running aground on Berrow Beach, Berrow, Somerset.

The captain risked his life by jumping overboard, into the muddy, icy cold waters of the Severn Estuary. None of the other crewmen nor the ship's dog followed. At 11:30 on 3 March, the RNLI lifeboat Godfrey Morris reached the stricken vessel, which was standing upright on Gore Sands. All crew* and the ship's dog were rescued and taken to safety. It is said that local villagers helped in the rescue by way of hot drinks, food and warm blankets.

Salvage began almost immediately, with the insurers logging her as "sold as a wreck" on 2 April 1897.

The figurehead from the ship is displayed in Berrow village hall.

Peder Olsen's last ship was the barque Gilead, which disappeared on a trip to England in October 1901.

== Gallery ==
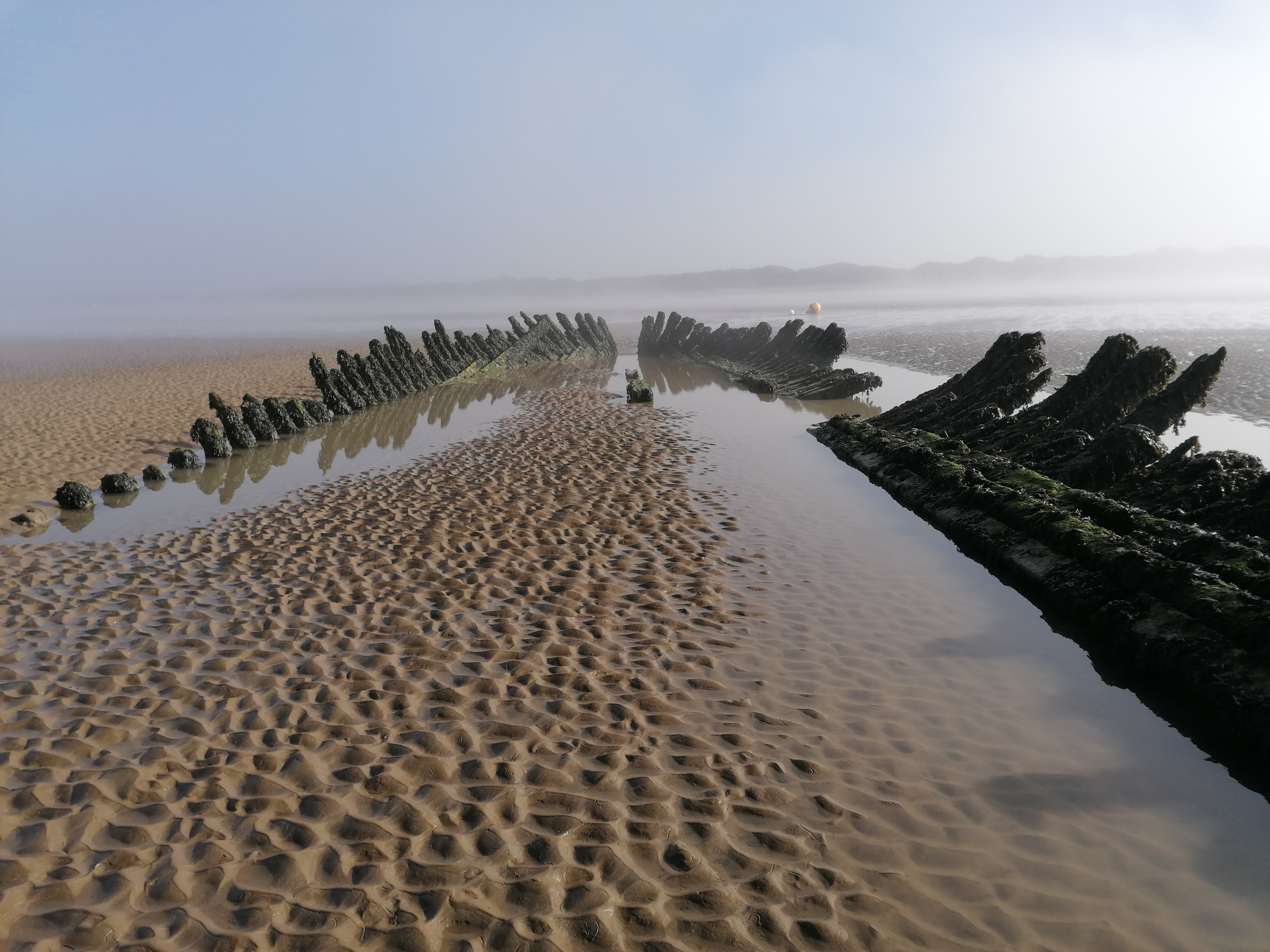
Midship facing toward land

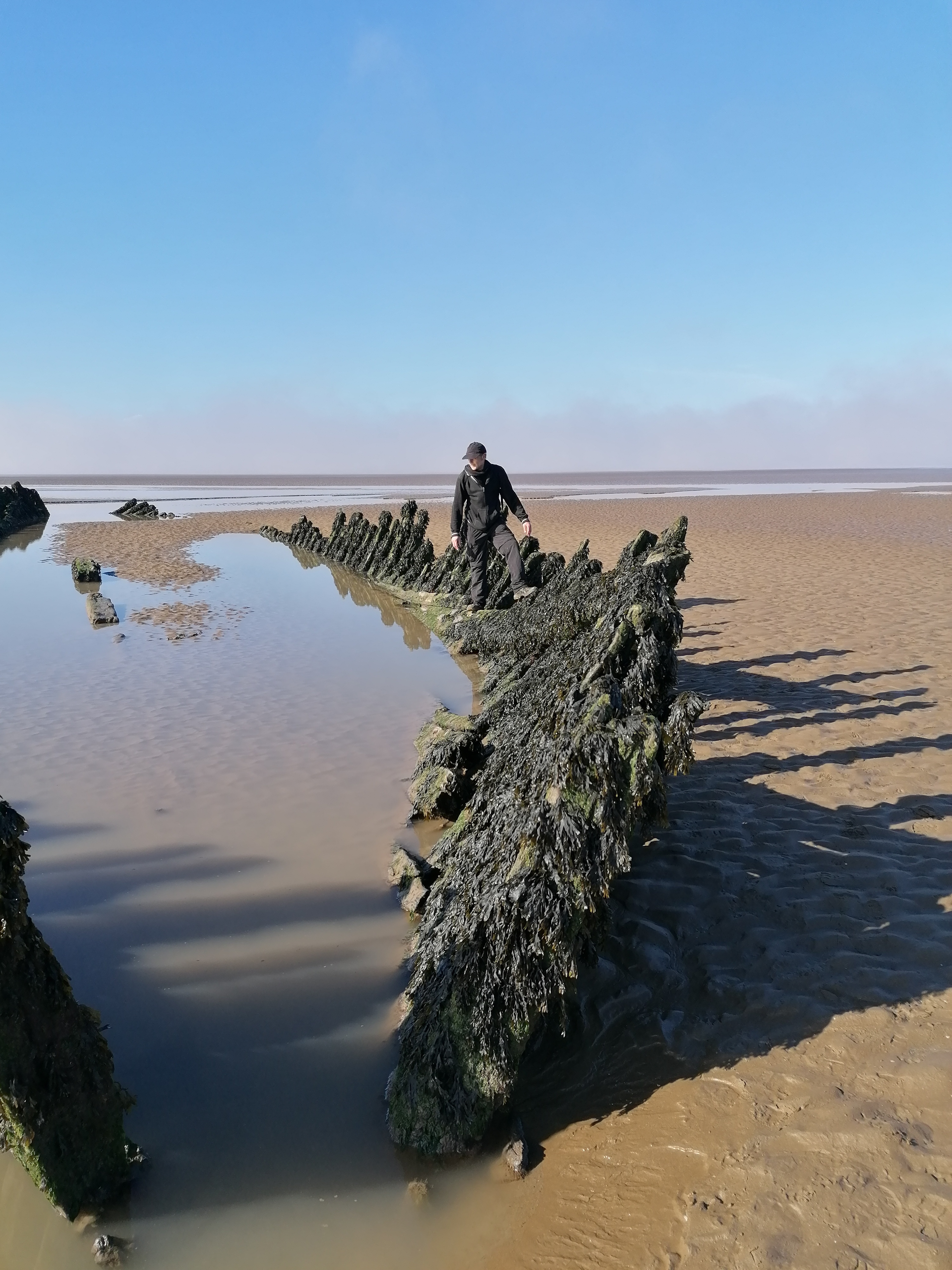
View seaward from bow

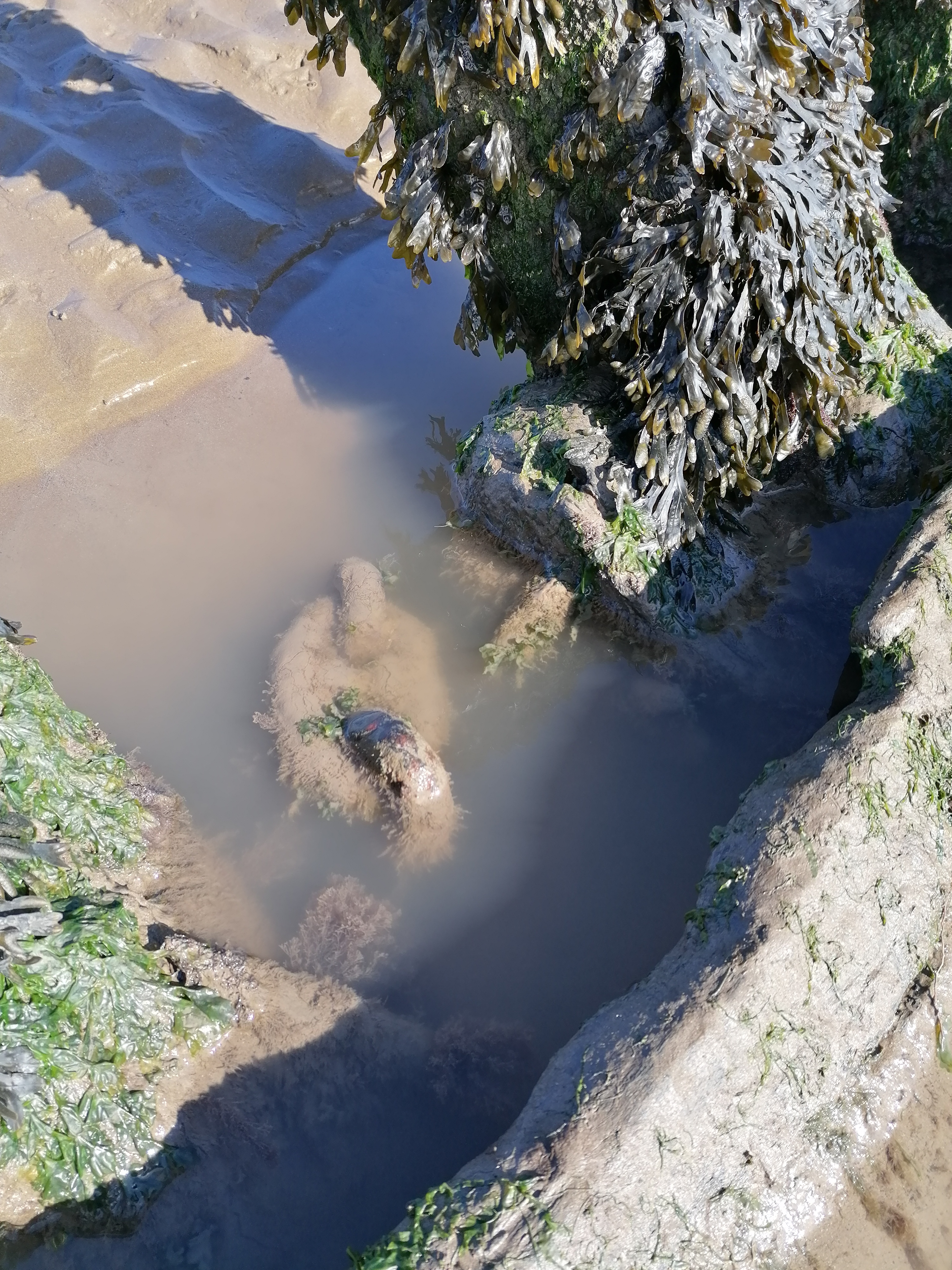
Links from an anchor chain

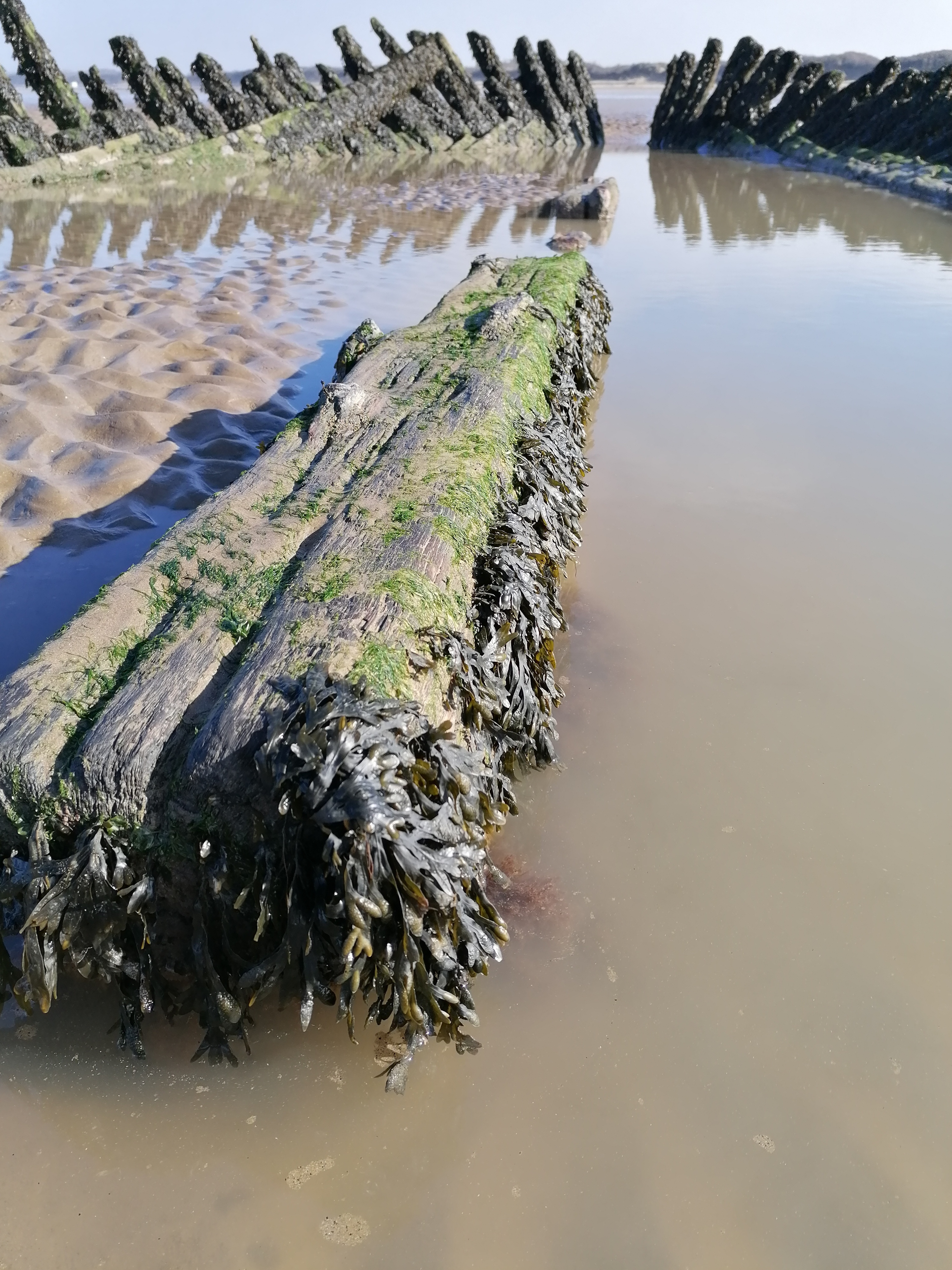
Fore-aft keel section

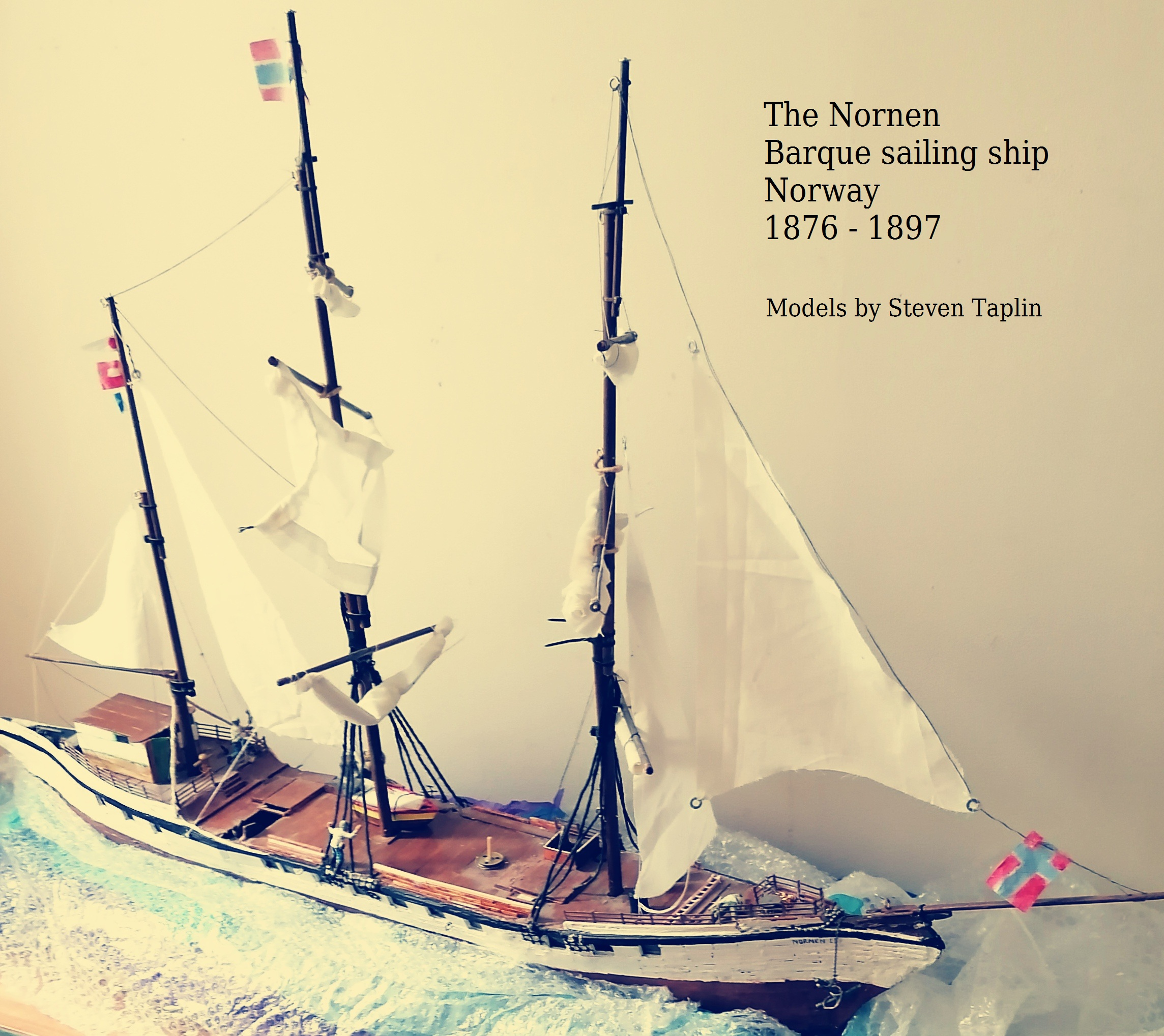
Model of the Nornen scale 1/32

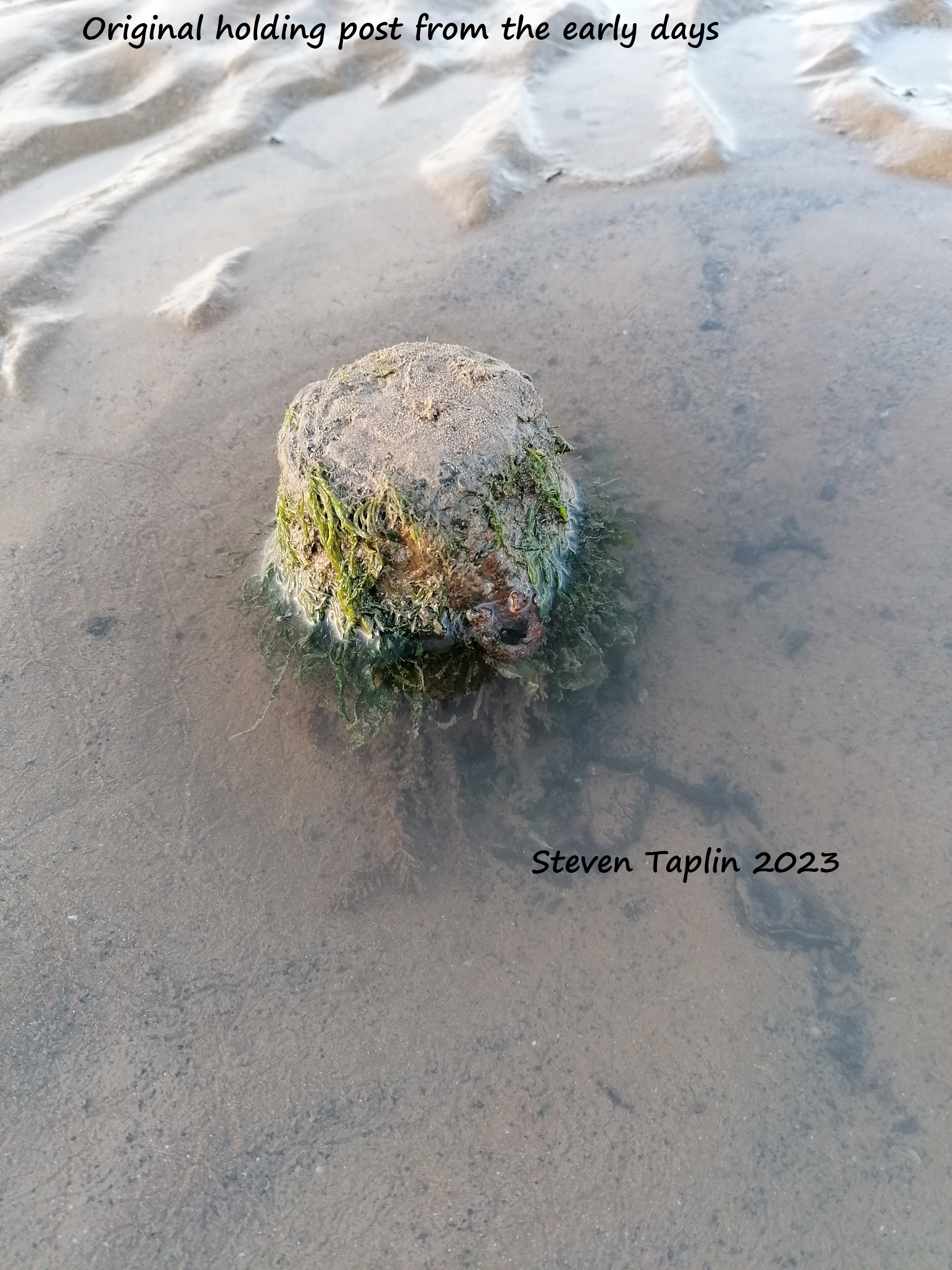

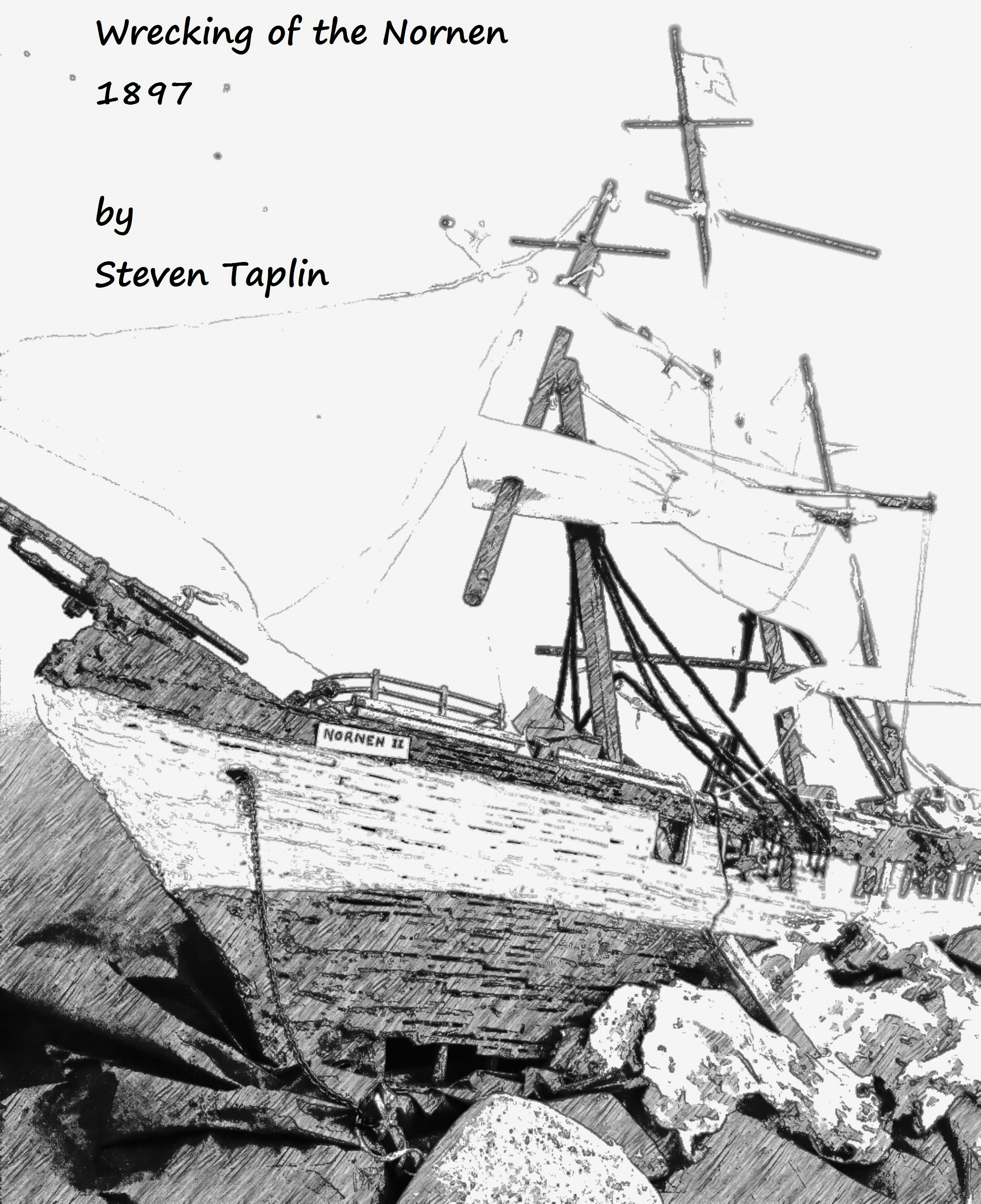

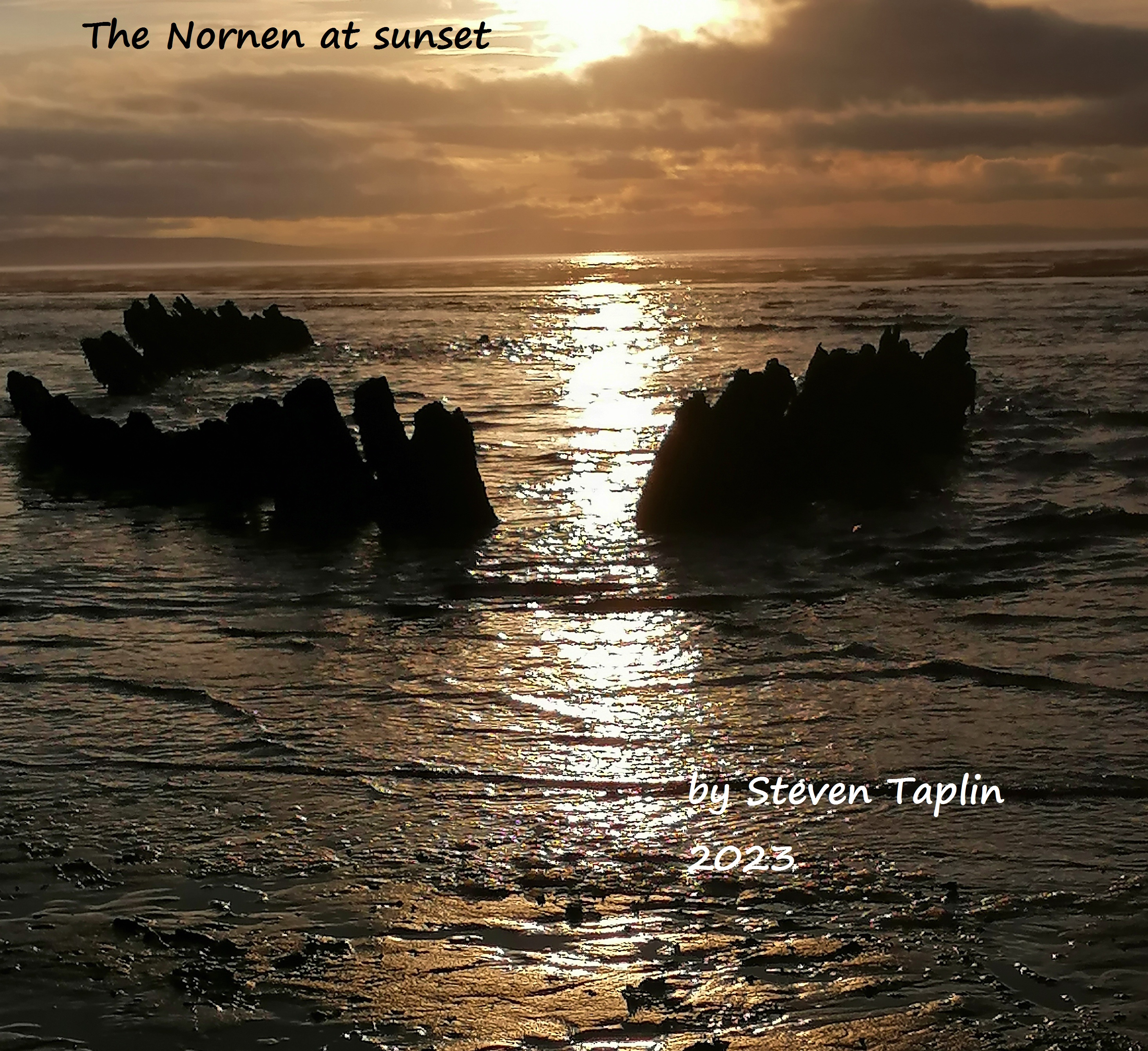
