= SS Barnsley =

Passenger and cargo vessel

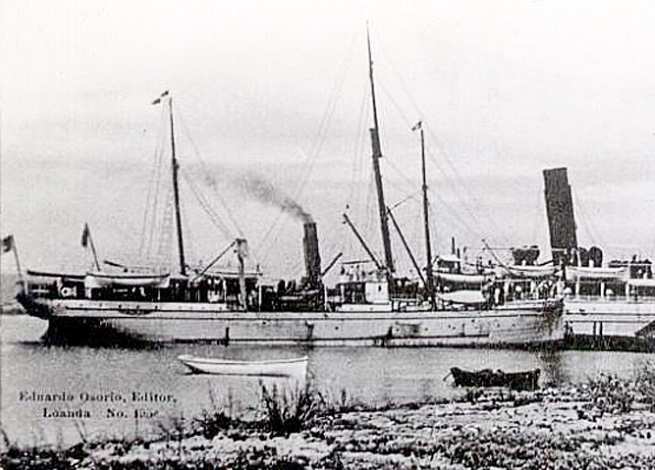

History
- Name: 1876–1889: SS Barnsley; 1889–1905: SS Gomes VI; 1905–1909: SS Lobito
- Operator: 1876–1889: Manchester, Sheffield and Lincolnshire Railway; 1889–1898: A Gomez, Lisbon; 1898–1905: Empreza de Navegação por Vapor para o Algarve e Guadiana, Lisbon; 1905–1905: J Soares Franco, Lisbon; 1905–1906: João Fonseca e Sá, Lisbon; 1905–1909: Empreza Nacional de Navegação, Lisbon
- Port of registry: 1876–1889: (United Kingdom); 1889–1909: (Portugal)
- Builder: John Elder and Company, Govan
- Yard number: 200
- Launched: 20 May 1876
- Out of service: 4 February 1909
- Fate: Sunk 1909

General characteristics
- Tonnage: 603 gross register tons (GRT)
- Length: 185.2 feet (56.4 m)
- Beam: 27 feet (8.2 m)

SS Barnsley was a passenger and cargo vessel built for the Manchester, Sheffield and Lincolnshire Railway in 1876.

== History ==
Barnsley was built by John Elder and Company of Govan, Scotland, and launched on 20 May 1876 By Miss Jamieson. She was intended for the services from Grimsby, England, to Hamburg, Germany, and Antwerp, Belgium.

In 1889 she was sold to A Gomez, Lisbon, Portugal, and renamed Gomes VI. She was sold again in 1898 to Empreza de Navegação por Vapor para o Algarve e Guadiana, Lisbon, and then in 1905 through J Soares Franco, João Fonseca e Sá, to Empreza Nacional de Navegação, all in Lisbon. She was renamed Lobito.

Lobito sank on 4 February 1909 at Ilha do Maio in the Cape Verde Islands while on passage from São Vicente for Cape Verde.
