= HMS Condor (1876) =

Gunvessel of the Royal Navy

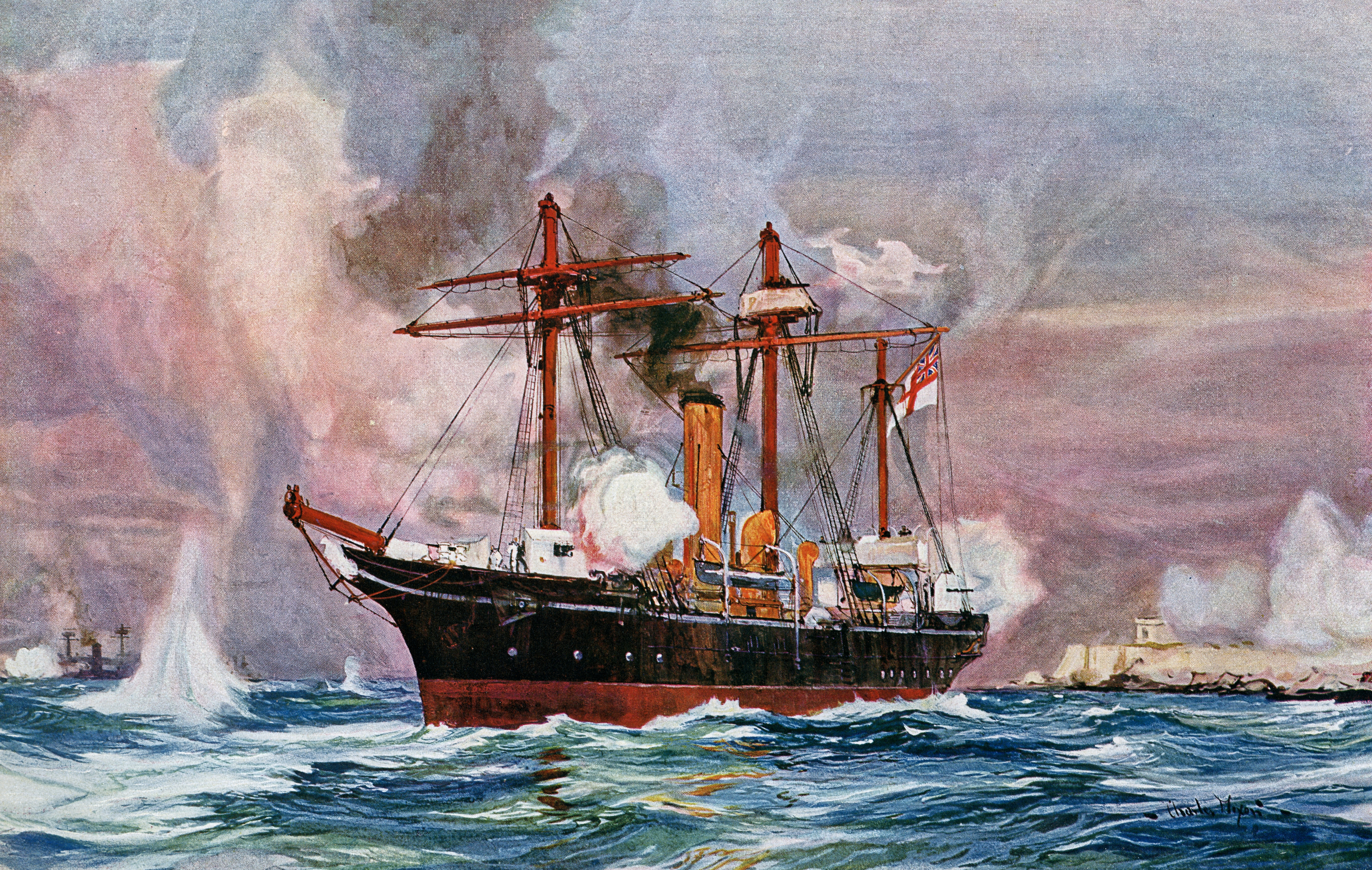
- "Well Done Condor". Bombardment of Alexandria, 1882 by Charles Dixon

History

United Kingdom
- Name: HMS Condor
- Ordered: 1875
- Builder: Devonport Dockyard
- Laid down: 15 December 1875
- Launched: 28 December 1876
- Commissioned: 17 July 1877
- Fate: Sold to George Cohen, August 1889

General characteristics
- Class & type: Condor-class composite gunvessel
- Displacement: 774 tons
- Length: 157 ft (48 m)
- Beam: 29 ft 6 in (8.99 m)
- Draught: 12 ft (3.7 m)
- Installed power: 772 ihp (576 kW)
- Propulsion: 3 Boilers; 2-cylinder horizontal compound-expansion steam engine; Single screw
- Sail plan: Barque-rigged
- Speed: 11.5 knots (21.3 km/h; 13.2 mph) under power
- Complement: 100
- Armament: One 7-in (4½-ton) Muzzle-Loading Rifle; Two 64-pdr (64cwt) Muzzle-Loading Rifles

HMS Condor was the name-ship of the Royal Navy Condor-class gun-ship carrying 3 guns.

== Construction ==
Designed by Nathaniel Barnaby, the Royal Navy Director of Naval Construction, her hull was of composite construction; that is, iron keel, frames, stem and stern posts with wooden planking. She was fitted with a 2-cylinder horizontal compound expansion steam engine driving a single screw, produced by John Elder & Co. She was rigged with three masts, with square rig on the fore- and main-masts, making her a barque-rigged vessel. Her keel was laid at Devonport Royal Dockyard on 15 December 1875 and she was launched on 28 December 1876.

== Service ==
After official commission into the Royal Navy on 17 July 1877, Condor joined the Mediterranean Fleet in 1879, remaining there until at least 1886.

HMS Condor was under the command Lord Charles Beresford and had the war correspondent Frederic Villiers, and Moberly Bell of The Times, on board as a guests. Over and above its three main guns the ship had a Gatling gun mounted on the main-top.

The three standard guns (one 112-pounder and two 64-pounders) were supplemented by three recently added 7 pounders.

=== Bombardment of Alexandria ===
Early in 1882 Egypt was struggling to resist a wave of nationalism and independence from Britain under the banner of "Egypt for the Egyptians".

After rioting in Alexandria, during which Europeans were killed, Admiral Seymour aboard HMS Invincible in company with a fleet of 15 ironclads under his command, was ordered to go to the area in June 1882. He arrived at Alexandria in order to protect the lives and property of British subjects, and safeguard access to the Suez Canal. Local native forces began work to improve the fortifications, and when they failed to respond to Seymour's ultimatum to stop work on 6 July. A second ultimatum on 10 July was more specific that a bombardment would begin on the morning of 11 July unless the harbour defences were relinquished. Foreign ships were asked to leave the harbour, including a large French fleet which moved to Port Said.

Seymour (on HMS Invincible) signalled to HMS Alexandra to commence firing at the Ras-el-Tin fortifications at 7:00 a.m. on 11 July 1882, followed by the general order to attack the enemy's batteries. The offshore squadron at first conducted the attack while underway, but this proved difficult, and by 9:40, Sultan, Superb and Alexandra had anchored off the Lighthouse Fort and concentrated their fire on the heavily armed Ras-el-Tin battery. By 12:30, Inflexible had joined the attack and the fort's guns were silenced.

[A] steady cannonade was maintained by the attacking and defending forces, and for the next few hours the roar of the guns and the shrieks of passing shot and shell were alone audible."

— Royle

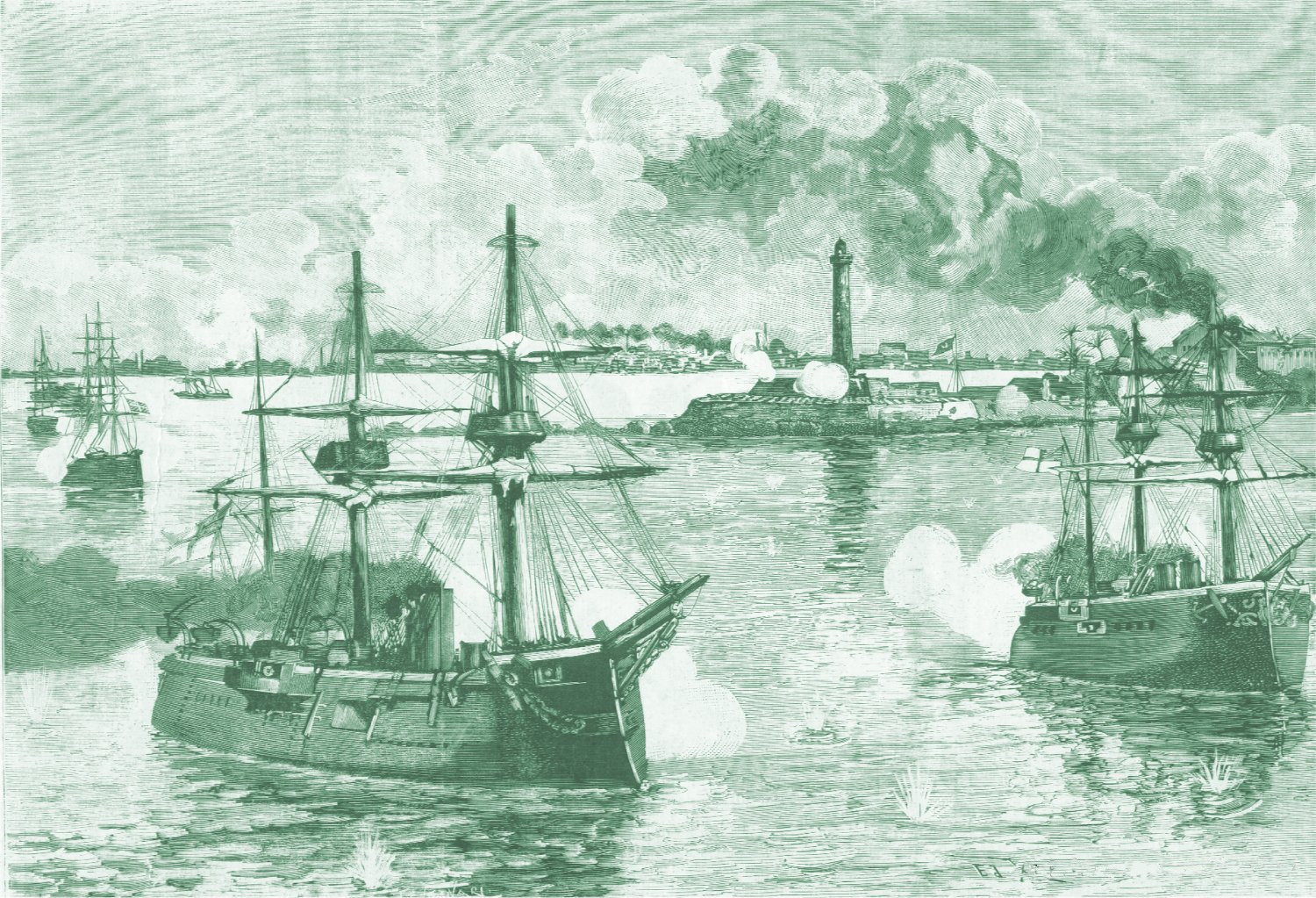
The Bombardment of Alexandria, 11 July 1882, from Le Monde Illustré

The larger ships began an attack on the Fort Mex battery but Temeraire ran aground. This enabled Condor, commanded by Lord Charles Beresford, to go to her assistance. She was refloated around 8am and resumed the attack.

While the offshore squadron was engaging the forts at long-range, the in-shore group, Monarch, Penelope were engaging the main harbour and eastern forts including the Maza-el-Kanat battery. However, Fort Marabout to the west, had a raking view across the approaches to the harbour and was equipped with heavy guns capable of jeopardising the entire attack. Beresford stated he would attack Fort Marabout to divert their fire from the main group. Condor sailed to within 400m of Fort Marabout and began furiously firing at the fort. This great proximity had a strange advantage because the guns in the fort could only awkwardly be repositioned to point downwards.

After two hours of exchanging fire, with Fort Marabout much disabled, Admiral Seymour ordered the smaller gunships, HMS Bittern, HMS Cygnet and HMS Decoy to move in to finish the affray.

When Fort Marabout's guns were disabled, the flag lieutenant Hedworth Lambton on Invincible signalled "Well Done, Condor." Condor's action allowed the ships to finish off Fort Mex.

== Fate ==
Condor later served in the campaign in the Eastern Sudan in 1885 and was based at Suakin.

After a short career, Condor was sold to Mr George Cohen in August 1889.

She ended her career at Dead Man's Bay near Plymouth Sound in 1894. Lord Charles Beresford rescued her binnacle as a souvenir.

== Publications ==
- Colledge, J. J.; Warlow, Ben & Bush, Steve (2020). Ships of the Royal Navy: The Complete Record of all Fighting Ships of the Royal Navy from the 15th Century to the Present (5th revised and updated ed.). Seaforth Publishing. ISBN 978-1-5267-9327-0.
- Lyon, David & Winfield, Rif (2004). The Sail and Steam Navy List: All the Ships of the Royal Navy 1815–1889. Chatham Publishing. ISBN 978-1-86176-032-6. OCLC 52620555.
