= Earlshall =

Ship

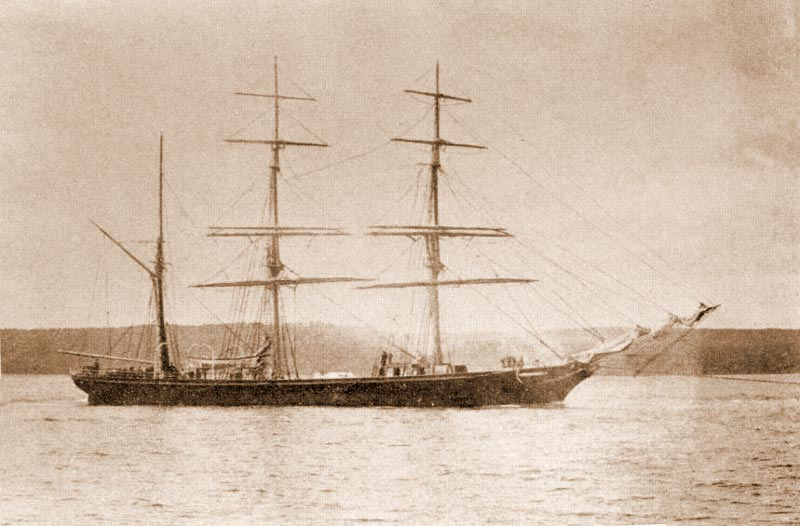

History
- Name: Earlshall
- Owner: Job Bros. & Co. Ltd., St. John's, Newfoundland
- Port of registry: St. John's, Dominion of Newfoundland
- Ordered: 1876
- Builder: William Bruce Thompson, Dundee
- Yard number: 16
- Laid down: 1876
- Launched: 1876 for Robertson Brothers, Dundee
- Acquired: 1912 by Job Bros. & Co. Ltd., St. John's, Newfoundland
- In service: 1876
- Out of service: 1915
- Identification: 73405
- Fate: Wrecked

General characteristics
- Class & type: Bulk cargo
- Type: Iron sailing barque
- Tonnage: 422 grt
- Length: 142 feet
- Beam: 27 feet
- Propulsion: Sail and fitted with an auxiliary oil engine 1912

Earlshall (73405) was an iron hulled Barque registered in St. John's, Dominion of Newfoundland. It ran aground and wrecked on January 24, 1915, with no loss of life in Leeward Cove, 1.5 miles south of Motion Head, Petty Harbour-Maddox Cove, Newfoundland.

== History ==
The Earlshall was constructed by William Bruce Thompson at Dundee and launched on October 5, 1876. It entered service with Robertson Brothers, Dundee. In 1910 the vessel was purchased by Job Bros. & Co. Ltd., St. John's, Newfoundland & Labrador and entered service in the foreign fish cargo fleet which transported salted cod from Newfoundland to various ports along the east coast of North and South America.

== Loss ==
The Earlshall along with the vessels Clutha, Attila and Waterwitch were en route to St. John's Newfoundland from various ports in Brazil. On January 23, 1915, the vessels passed Cape Race all within one hour of each other. They met sea ice but kept to the south and skirted the main flow. By that evening the vessels had passed Ferryland Head and were practically together.

At 3am the following day a snow storm moved in, by that time the vessels were within speaking distance of each other with the Attila being closest to the Earlshall. The wind grew stronger and the snowfall increased in intensity making it impossible to see the light house at Cape Spear. The Earlshall moved away from the Attila. The Atilla and the other vessels continued on and safely reached port at St. John's later that day.

At about 4am, aboard the Earlshall, there was a tremendous crash as the vessel ran aground just south of Motion Head, Petty Harbour-Maddox Cove. Captain Coward was asleep at the time and the mate was on watch. The seas were heavy and the vessel was pounded against the rocks and leaking badly. The boats were launched with one being damaged and nearly sinking. The crew all managed to escape the stricken vessel and then rowed 8 miles south before making landfall. They walked 2 miles over land before finding shelter at a home in Goulds. Contemporary reports state the Earlshall ran aground at practically the same location as the SS Regulus which would be in Leeward Cove, 1.5 miles south of Motion Head.

The captains of the other vessels were very upset that a tug had not been sent to meet them when it was known they had passed Cape Race the previous day.
