= Condor-class gunvessel =

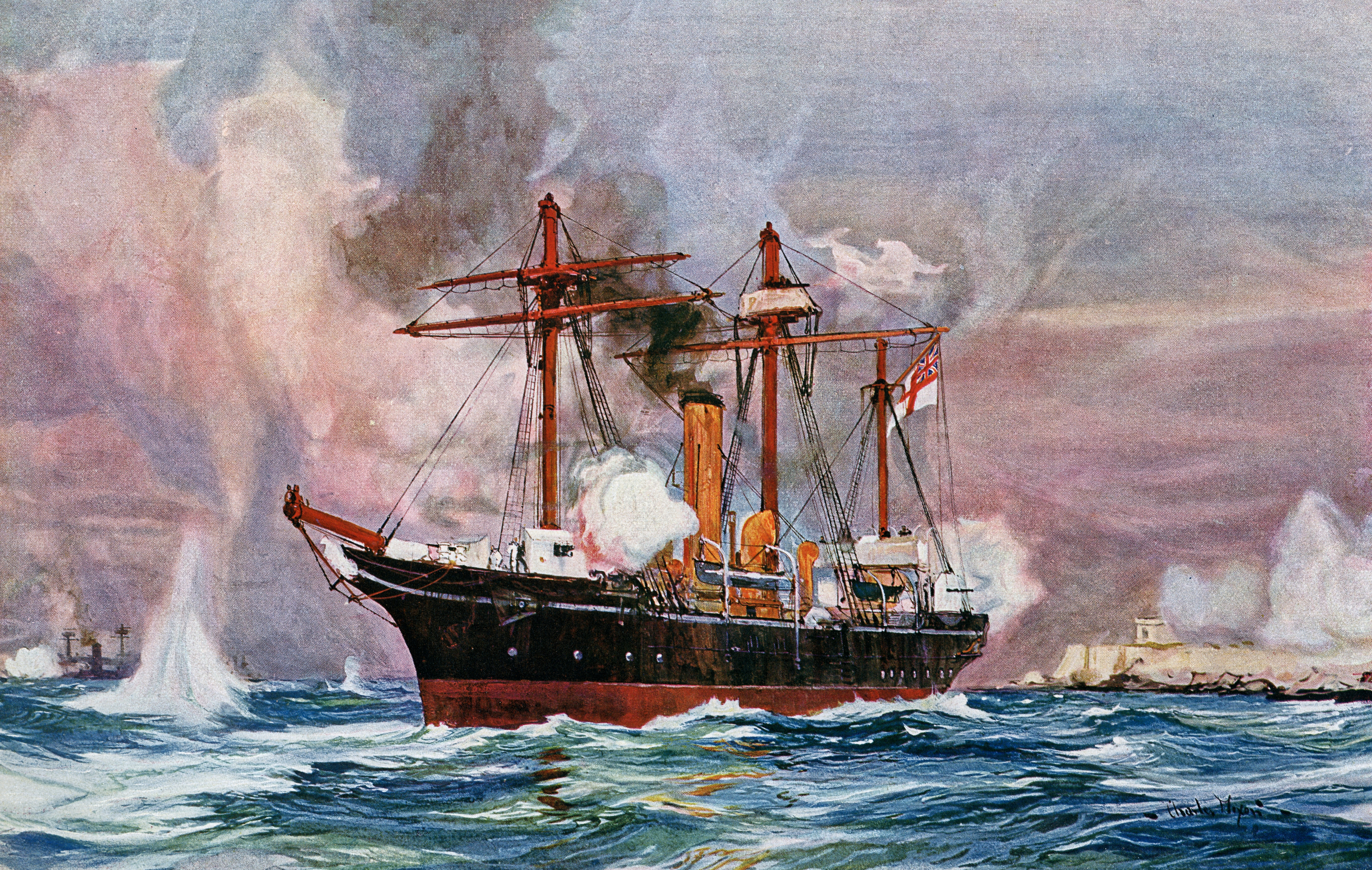
- "Well Done Condor". Bombardment of Alexandria, 1882 by Charles Dixon

Class overview
- Name: Condor-class gunvessels
- Builders: Devonport Dockyard; Laird Brothers, Birkenhead
- Operators: Royal Navy
- Built: 1876–1877
- In commission: 1877–1923
- Completed: 4

General characteristics
- Displacement: 774 tons
- Length: 157 ft (48 m)
- Beam: 29 ft 6 in (8.99 m)
- Draught: 12 ft (3.7 m)
- Installed power: Designed 750 ihp (560 kW)
- Propulsion: Three Boilers; 2-cylinder horizontal compound-expansion steam engine; Single screw (Laird vessels had feathering blades)
- Sail plan: Barque-rigged
- Speed: 11.5 kn (21.3 km/h) under power
- Complement: 100
- Armament: One 7-in (4½-ton) muzzle-loading rifle; Two 64-pounder (64cwt) muzzle-loading rifles; Except Flamingo: One 7-in (4½-ton) muzzle-loading rifle; One 64-pounder (64cwt) muzzle-loading rifles; Two 20-pounder Breech-Loaders; Flamingo and Griffon rearmed in 1884: 7-in MLR replaced with two 5-in Vavasseur breech loaders

The Condor-class gunvessel was a class of four Royal Navy composite gunvessels of 3 guns, built between 1876 and 1877. They were all hulked or sold before 1893, giving them an active life of less than 15 years.

== Construction ==
=== Design ===
Designed by Nathaniel Barnaby, the Royal Navy Director of Naval Construction, the hull was of composite construction; that is, iron keel, frames, stem and stern posts with wooden planking.

=== Propulsion ===
They were fitted with three boilers, a 2-cylinder horizontal compound expansion steam engine and a single screw. Griffon and Falcon were engined by Laird Brothers and had a feathering propeller. Flamingo and Condor were engined by John Elder & Co, and all ships had a designed 750 indicated horsepower (560 kW), developing about 11.5 knots (21.3 km/h; 13.2 mph) under power.

=== Sail plan ===
The class was rigged with three masts, with square rig on the fore- and main-masts, making them barque-rigged vessels.

=== Armament ===
The ships of the class were fitted with a 7-in (4½-ton) muzzle-loading rifle and two 64-pounder (64cwt) muzzle-loading rifles, except for Flamingo, which had two 20-pounder breech-loaders in place of one of the 64-pounder muzzle-loading rifles. In 1884 Flamingo and Griffon were rearmed with two 5-in Vavasseur breech loaders replacing the 7-in muzzle-loading rifle.

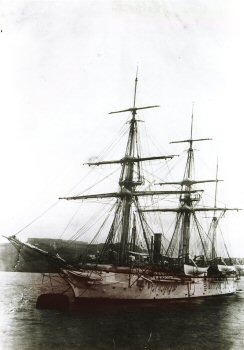
HMS Griffon

== Ships ==
Name	Ship Builder	Launched	Fate
Flamingo	Devonport Dockyard	13 December 1876	Hulk 1893. Sold to Plymouth Port Sanitary Authority on 25 May 1923. Sold on 4 May 1931 for breaking
Griffon	Laird Brothers, Birkenhead	16 December 1876	Sold to the Board of Trade as a hulk on 28 September 1891 and renamed Richmond
Condor	Devonport Dockyard	28 December 1876	Sold to George Cohen in August 1889
Falcon	Laird Brothers, Birkenhead	4 January 1877	Hulk in 1890. Sold to E W Payne & Company on 25 June 1920

== Bibliography ==
- Colledge, J. J.; Warlow, Ben & Bush, Steve (2020). Ships of the Royal Navy: The Complete Record of all Fighting Ships of the Royal Navy from the 15th Century to the Present (5th revised and updated ed.). Seaforth Publishing. ISBN 978-1-5267-9327-0.
- Lyon, David & Winfield, Rif (2004). The Sail and Steam Navy List: All the Ships of the Royal Navy 1815–1889. Chatham Publishing. ISBN 978-1-86176-032-6. OCLC 52620555.
