= List of ship launches in 1878 =

The list of ship launches in 1878 includes a chronological list of some ships launched in 1878.

Date	Ship	Class / type	Builder	Location	Country	Notes
3 January	Marchioness of Londonderry	Steamship	Messrs. E. Withy & Co.	Hartlepool	United Kingdom	For Marquess of Londonderry.
5 January	Dahlia	Barquentine	J. T. Crampton	Landport	United Kingdom	For J. T. Crampton.
5 January	Genoese	Steamship	Messrs. Oswald	Woolston	United Kingdom	For private owner.
5 January	Thomas Collingdon	Tug	Messrs. Elliot & Jeffrey	Cardiff	United Kingdom	For private owner.
15 January	Preanger No. 2	Steam hopper barge	Messrs. Thomas Wingate & Co.	Whiteinch	United Kingdom	For Dutch Government.
16 January	Selby	Smack	Joseph Burton	Selby	United Kingdom	For Robert Hellyer.
17 January	Lammerlaw	Barque	Messrs. David & William Henderson & Co.	Partick	United Kingdom	For Messrs. Wood Bros. & Co.
17 January	Lammerlaw	Barque	Messrs. Alexander Stephen & Sons	Linthouse	United Kingdom	For Messrs. D. H. Wätjen & Co.
18 January	Esparto	Lighter	Meossrs. William Swan & Son	Kelvindock	United Kingdom	For Burrell & Haig.
19 January	Anatolia	Steamship	Messrs. William Gray & Co.	West Hartlepool	United Kingdom	For private owner.
19 January	Camelot	Steamship	Messrs. Aitken & Mansel	Whiteinch	United Kingdom	For John C. Aitken.
19 January	Constantine	Steamship	Messrs. A. Leslie & Co.	Hebburn	United Kingdom	For Kjobenhaven-Newcastle Company.
19 January	Loch Sunart	Full-rigged ship	A. & J. Inglis	Pointhouse	United Kingdom	For General Shipping Co.
19 January	Mariotis	Steamship	Charles Mitchell	Low Walker	United Kingdom	For Moss Steam Ship Co.
19 January	Merlin	Steamship	Messrs. Schlesinger, Davis & Col	Wallsend	United Kingdom	For private owner.
19 January	Ryevale	Barque	Messrs. Birrell, Stenhouse & Co.	Dumbarton	United Kingdom	For William Wylie.
21 January	Celo	Steamship	Messrs. Pearse & Co.	Stockton-on-Tees	United Kingdom	For H. Clarke.
21 January	Ocean King	Steamship	James E. Scott	Greenock	United Kingdom	For Messrs. William Ross & Co.
21 January	Princess of Thule	Schooner	Messrs. Gough & Co.	Bridgwater	United Kingdom	For Mr. Mackenzie.
21 January	The Mouse	Merchantman	Messrs. Thomas Grendon & Co.	Drogheda	United Kingdom	For private owner.
22 January	Cadzow Forest	Clipper	Messrs. Russell & Co.	Port Glasgow	United Kingdom	For Mr. Pollok, Mr. Robin and others.
28 January	Mable	Steamship	Messrs. Black & Robb	Montrose	United Kingdom	For D. Murison.
31 January	County of Cromarty	Merchantman	Messrs. Barclay, Curle & Co.	Whiteinch	United Kingdom	For Messrs. R. & J. Craig.
January	Ardanach	Steamship	Messrs. Henry Murray & Co.	Port Glasgow	United Kingdom	For M'Laren, Crum & Co.
January	Cecil	Steam launch	Messrs. Forrest	River Thames	United Kingdom	For War Department.
January	County of Kinross	Merchantman	Messrs. Barclay, Curle & Co.	Whiteinch	United Kingdom	For Messrs. R. & J. Craig.
January	Dunfillan	Merchantman	Messrs. Dobie & Co.	Govan	United Kingdom	For private owner.
Januiary	Henry Venn	Paddle steamer	Messrs. Lobnitz, Coulborn & Co.	Renfrew	United Kingdom	For Church Missionary Society.
January	Herat	Merchantman	Messrs. Oswald	Woolston	United Kingdom	For private owner.
January	Lesmona	Barque	Messrs. Alexander Stephen & Sons	Linthouse	United Kingdom	For Messrs. Wätjen & Co.
January	Powhattan	Steamship	Messrs. Thomas Royden & Sons	Liverpop;	United Kingdom	For Mediterranean and New York Steamship Company Limited, or Messrs. Phelps Bros.
January	Wenchow	Coaster	Messrs. Scott & Co.	Greenock	United Kingdom	For private owner.
January	Not named	Steamship	Messrs. William Denny & Bros.	Dumbarton	United Kingdom	For Irrawaddy Flotilla Company.
2 February	Denmore	Steamship	Messrs. Alexander Hall & Co.	Footdee	United Kingdom	For Messrs. Alexander Nicol & Co.
2 February	Jeranos	Steamship	Messrs. Richardson, Duck & Co	South Stockton-on-Tees	United Kingdom	For Messrs. Henry Briggs, Sons, & Co.
2 February	Maggie	Schooner	John Webster	Peterhead	United Kingdom	For private owner.
2 February	Slieve Roe	Sailing ship	Harland & Wolff	Belfast	United Kingdom	For W. P. Sinclair & Co.
4 February	Princess of Wales	Paddle steamer	London and Glasgow Engineering and Iron Shipbuilding Company	Govan	United Kingdom	For Great Eastern Railway.
6 February	Countess of Aberdeen	Steamship	Barrow Ship Building Co. Ltd.	Barrow-in-Furness	United Kingdom	For Aberdeen, Newcastle, and Hull Steam Navigation Company (Limited).
6 February	Recovery	Salvage vessel	Barrow Ship Building Co. Ltd.	Barrow-in-Furness	United Kingdom	For Independence Marine Salvage and Steam Pump Company.
7 February	Balmoral	Steamship	Messrs. Hall, Russell & Co.	Footdee	United Kingdom	For Messrs. J. & A. Davidson.
8 February	Adina	Schooner	Messrs. H. M'Intyre & Co.	Paisley	United Kingdom	For Messrs. Gillies & Reid.
16 February	Illawarra	Paddle steamer	Messrs. Wigham, Richardson & Co.	Newcastle upon Tyne	United Kingdom	For Mr. Christie and others.
18 February	Bittern	Steamship	Messrs. M. Pearse & Co.	Stockton-on-Tees	United Kingdom	For General Steam Navigation Company.
18 February	Ella	Steamship	Messrs. Richardson, Duck & Co	South Stockton	United Kingdom	For Messrs. Head, Wrigtson & Co.
18 February	Katie Swyny	Schooner	Paul Rodgers	Carrickfergus	United Kingdom	For Messrs. Thomas Fisher & Co.
Unknown date	Perseverance	Sloop	W. Butler	Stainforth (Note: The source does not specify which Stainforth is meant. This is possibly Stainforth, South Yorkshire, on the Stainforth and Keadby Canal, which was a boatbuilding centre in the 19th century, but this has not so far been confirmed by a reliable source.)	United Kingdom	For Mr. Chatterton.
19 February	Rydal Hall	Steamship	London and Glasgow Shipbuilding Co.	Govan	United Kingdom	For Messrs. Alexander & Radcliffe.
19 February	Shamrock	Steamship	Messrs. Ramage & Ferguson	Leith	United Kingdom	For John Crawford.
20 February	Nerissa	Schooner	Thomas Jones	Aberystwyth	United Kingdom	For David Jenkins.
20 February	Telephone	Steamship	Messrs. Hugh M'Intytre & Co	Merksworth	United Kingdom	For Messrs. M'Gowan & Lane.
21 February	Eirene	Steamship	Messrs. David & William Henderson & Co.	Partick	United Kingdom	For Messrs. Donaldson Bros.
21 February	John Lyon	Fishing smack	Marr Bros.	Hull	United Kingdom	For George Rowntree.
21 February	Windermere	Merchantman	Messrs. W. H. Potter & Co.	Liverpool	United Kingdom	For Messrs. Fisher & Sprott.
28 February	Argus	Merchantman	Messrs. Barclay, Curle & Co.	Whiteinch	United Kingdom	For Messrs. A. & J. H. Carmichael & Co.
28 February	Fairy Queen	Steamship	Messrs. T. B. Seath & Co.	Rutherglen / Loch Eck	United Kingdom	For Glasgow and Inveraray Steamboat Company.
February	Brighton	Paddle steamer	Messrs. John Elder & Co.	Govan	United Kingdom	For London, Brighton and South Coast Railway and Chemins de fer de l'Ouest.
February	Brodick Bay	Barque	Messrs. Birrell, Stenhouse & Co.	Dumbarton	United Kingdom	For Bay Line.
February	Fiona	Merchantman	Messrs. Charles Connell & Co.	Whiteinch	United Kingdom	For Messrs. J. D. Clink and others.
February	Gannet	Steamship	Messrs. Barclay, Curle & Co.	Whiteinc	United Kingdom	For Messrs. Slater, White & Co.
February	Guy Mannering	Barque	Messrs. A. M'Millan & Sons	Dumbarton	United Kingdom	For James Hunter.
February	Katoomba	Steamship	Messrs. Blackwood & Gordon	Port Glasgow	United Kingdom	For Australian Steam Navigation Company.
February	Merak	Dredger	Messrs. Wingate & Co.	Whiteinch	United Kingdom	For Dutch Government.
February	Oregon	Steamship	Delaware River Iron Ship Building and Engine Works	Chester, Pennsylvania	United States	For Oregon Steamship Company.
February	Saxon	Steamship	Messrs. Murdoch, Murray & Co.	Port Glasgow	United Kingdom	For J. J. M'Farlane.
February	Selina Mary	Smack	Mr. Brooming	Calstock	United Kingdom	For Charles Hamley.
February	Titus	Steamship	Messrs. Alexander Stephens & Sons	Linthouse	United Kingdom	For Charles Andersen.
2 March	Celerity	Steam fishing cutter	Messrs. Raylton, Dixon & Co.	Middlesbrough	United Kingdom	For Great Grimsby Ice Company.
2 March	Dispatch	Steam fishing cutter	Messrs. Raylton, Dixon & Co.	Middlesbrough	United Kingdom	For Great Grimsby Ice Company.
2 March	Glasgow	Royal yacht	William Denny and Brothers	Dumbarton	United Kingdom	For Sultan of Zanzibar.
4 March	Pliny	Steamship	Barrow Ship Building Co. Ltd.	Barrow-in-Furness	United Kingdom	For Liverpool, Brazil & River Plate Steam Navigation Co.
5 March	Firth of Lorn	Barque	Messrs. Dobie & Co.	Govan	United Kingdom	For Messrs. James Spencer & Co.
5 March	Fulica	Steamship	Mounsey & Foster	Sunderland	United Kingdom	For Porteous & Senier.
5 March	Gaboon	Steamship	Messrs. John Elder & Co.	Fairfield	United Kingdom	For British and African Steam Navigation Co.
5 March	Kestrel	Steamship	Messrs. Gourlay Bros. & Co.	Dundee	United Kingdom	For General Steam Navigation Company.
5 March	Ulva	Steamship	Messrs. Robert Steele & Co.	Greenock	United Kingdom	For Messrs. James Currie & Co.
6 March	City of Rio de Janeiro	Passenger ship	John Roach and Son	Chester, Pennsylvania	United States	For United States & Brazil Mail Steamship Company.
6 March	Maggie	Schooner	Messrs. Stephen & Forbes	Peterhead	United Kingdom	For private owner.
7 March	British Empire	Passenger ship	Harland & Wolff	Belfast	United Kingdom	For British Shipowners Company (Limited).
7 March	County of Dumfries	full-rigged ship	Messrs. Barclay, Curle & Co.	Whiteinch	United Kingdom	For Messrs. R. & J. Craig.
7 March	Fanny	Steamship	Messrs. A. & J. Inglis	Pointhouose	United Kingdom	For Messrs. Burnett & Sons.
7 March	Hecla	Depot ship	Harland & Wolff	Belfast	United Kingdom	For Royal Navy.
7 March	Victoria	Paddle steamer	Messrs. John Elder & Co.	Govan	United Kingdom	For London, Brighton and South Coast Railway and Chemins de fer de l'Ouest.
9 March	Otterburn	Full-rigged ship	Messrs. Robert Steele & Co.	Greenock	United Kingdom	For Messrs. Robert Shankland & Co.
9 March	Retriever	Steamship	Messrs. Cunliffe & Dunlop	Port Glasgow	United Kingdom	For West Coast of America Telegraph Company.
12 March	Slieve Donard	Fishing vessel	John Connick	Dundalk	United Kingdom	For private owner.
13 March	Naworth Castle	Steamship	Joseph L. Thompson	Sunderland	United Kingdom	For Messrs. Watson, Errington & Co.
16 March	Matador	Monitor	Fijenoord	Rotterdam	Netherlands	For Royal Netherlands Navy.
18 March	Breton	Steamship	Messrs. Schlesinger, Davis & Co.	Wallsend	United Kingdom	For private owner.
18 March	Formosa	Cutter yacht	E. Ratsey	Cowes	United Kingdom	For Francis Sloane Stanley.
18 March	Oakdale	Steamship	Messrs. Edward Withy & Co.	Middleton	United Kingdom	For Messrs. Steel, Young & Co.
19 March	Circassia	Steamship	Barrow Iron Ship Building Co.	Barrow-in-Furness	United Kingdom	For Barrow Ocean Steamship Company.
19 March	Rheidol	Schooner	Messrs. John Jones & Bros.	Aberystwyth	United Kingdom	For Thomas Williams and others.
19 March	Allier	Allier-class transport	Arsenal de Lorient	Lorient	France	For French Navy
20 March	Clan Grant	Barque	Messrs David & William Henderson & Co.	Partick	United Kingdom	For Thomas Dunlop.
20 March	Cynisca	Barque	Messrs. Dobie & Co.	Govan	United Kingdom	For Hugh M'Ewan.
20 March	Lyttleton	Merchantman	Messrs. Robert Duncan & Co.	Port Glasgow	United Kingdom	For Messrs. Patrick Henderson & Co.
20 March	Mallard	Yacht	Messrs. Camper & Nicholson	Gosport	United Kingdom	For R. H. Baillie.
20 March	May	Schooner	Campbeltown Wood and Iron Shipbuilding Company	Campbeltopwn	United Kingdom	For Messrs. D. Colville & Co., and Greenlees & Colville.
20 March	Norah Creina	Paddle steamer	A. & J. Inglis	Glasgow	United Kingdom	For Drogheda Steam Packet Company.
20 March	Palala	Barque	Messrs. Alexander Stephen & Sons	Linthouse	United Kingdom	For Messrs. Bullard, King & Co.
20 March	Reina Mercedes	Steamship	Messrs. A. McMillan & Son	Dumbarton	United Kingdom	For Spanish Royal Mail Line.
20 March	Speke Hall	Steamship	Messrs. Charles Connell & Co.	Scotstoun	United Kingdom	For Hall Line.
20 March	Villa Rica	Steamship	Messrs. H. M'Intyre & Co	Paisley	United Kingdom	For Thomas Dewsbury.
20 March	Wanderer	Steamship	Messrs. W. Allsup & Sons	Preston	United Kingdom	For J. Pinnock.
21 March	Barcelona	Steamship	Messrs. Gourlay Bros.	Dundee	United Kingdom	For William Thompson and others.
22 March	Menora	Steamship	Messrs. William Denny & Bros.	Dumbarton	United Kingdom	For British India Steam Navigation Company.
22 March	Ralph Creyke	Steamship	Hardcastle & Watson	Pallion	United Kingdom	For Goole Steam Shipping Company.
23 March	Bridegroom	Steam launch	Messrs. Samuda Bros.	Cubitt Town	United Kingdom	For London Steamboat Company (Limited).
23 March	Folkestone	Steamship	Earle's Shipbuilding and Engineering Company (Limited)	Hull	United Kingdom	For South Eastern Railway.
23 March	Gwalia	Merchantman	Mounsey & Foster	Sunderland	United Kingdom	For Arvon Shipping Co.
23 March	Lucerne	Steamship	Messrs. Laird Bros.	Birkenhead	United Kingdom	For private owner.
March	Krawang	Steamship	W. Simons & Co.	Renfrew	United Kingdom	For Dutch Government.
March	Rheidol	Schooner		Aberystwyth	United Kingdom	For private owner.
1 April	Gabalva	Steamship	Messrs. Schlesinger, Davis & Co.	Wallsend	United Kingdom	For J. H. Wilson.
1 April	Sorrente	Steamship	Earle's Shipbuilding and Engineering Company (Limited)	Kingston upon Hull	United Kingdom	For Messrs. Thomas Wilson, Sons & Co.
2 April	Cyenus	Steamship	Tyne Iron Shipbuilding Company	Newcastle upon Tyne	United Kingdom	For Messrs. Kirby and Gillies.
3 April	Humbert	Steamship	Messrs. C. S. Swan & Co.	Wallsend	United Kingdom	For T. H. Davison.
4 April	Comus	Comus-class corvette	J. Elder & Co.	Glasgow	United Kingdom	For Royal Navy.
4 April	Harmony	Schooner	Peter Lund	Tarleton	United Kingdom	For private owner.
4 April	Warrington	Steamship	Messrs. Irvine & Co.	Hartlepool	United Kingdom	For Samuel Hough.
5 April	Cástor	Torpedo boat	Forges et Chantiers de la Méditerranée	La Seyne	France	For Spanish Navy
5 April	Merionethshire	Steamship	London and Glasgow Shipbuilding Co.	Glasgow	United Kingdom	For private owner.
6 April	City of Para	Steamship	John Roach and Son	Chester, Pennsylvania	United States	For private owner.
6 April	Maria Amelia	Steamship	Messrs. Charles Connell & Co.	Scotstoun	United Kingdom	For Mr. M'Leod.
6 April	Willem Barents	Schooner		Amsterdam	Netherlands	For Koninklijk Nederlandsch Aardrijkskundig Genootschap.
9 April	Columba	Paddle steamer	J. & G. Thomson	Clydebank	United Kingdom	For David Hutcheson & Co.
11 April	Tegal	Steam Hopper barge	Messrs. W. Simons & Co.	Renfrew	United Kingdom	For Dutch Government.
16 April	Only Sister	Fishing smack	George Brown	Hull	United Kingdom	For J. Sims.
17 April	Cimba	Full-rigged ship	A. Hood	Aberdeen	United Kingdom	For Alexander. Nicol & Co.
Unknown date	Cleopatra	Smack	Joseph Burton	Selby	United Kingdom	For Robert Hellyer.
17 April	Lascelles	Steamship	Barrow Ship Building Co. Ltd.	Barrow-in-Furness	United Kingdom	For W. Johnston & Co.
17 April	Mercury	Iris-class cruiser		Pembroke Dockyard	United Kingdom	For Royal Navy.
17 April	Northcote	Steamship	Messrs. Turnbull & Son	Whitby	United Kingdom	For Messrs. John Holman & Co.
17 April	Shamrock	Troopship	Forges et Chantiers de la Méditerranée	Le Havre	France	For French Navy.
17 April	Venice	Steamship	Messrs. Robert Steele & Co.	Greenock	United Kingdom	For Messrs. Donald Currie & Co.
18 April	Élan	Flotilla aviso	Forges et Chantiers de la Méditerranée	Le Havre	France	For French Navy
18 April	Brodick Castle	Steamship	Messrs. Hugh M'Intyre & Co.	Merksworth	United Kingdom	For Mr. Buchanan.
18 April	Curacoa	Comus-class corvette	John Elder & Co.	Govan	United Kingdom	For Royal Navy.
18 April	Cyclone	Steamship	Messrs. Robert Napier & Sons	Govan	United Kingdom	For Messrs. Napier & Brown.
18 April	Henry Anning	Steamship		River Tyne	United Kingdom	For J. H. Anning.
18 April	Houssa	Steamship	Messrs. Alexander Stephen & Sons	Linthouse	United Kingdom	For Messrs. Alexander Miller, Brother, & Co.
18 April	Llandough	Steamship	Messrs. Schlesinger, Davis & Co.	Wallsend-on-Tyne	United Kingdom	For C. E. Stallybrass.
18 April	Sierra Colonna	Full-rigged ship	Messrs. Richardson, Duck & Co.	South Stockton	United Kingdom	For Messrs. Thompson, Anderson & Co.
18 April	Trongate	Barque	Messrs. Dobie & Co.	Govan	United Kingdom	For Messrs. E. Lennox, Alexander & Co.
18 April	Vine	Steamship	Messrs. D. & W. Henderson & Co.	Partick	United Kingdom	For Glasgow and Londonderry Steam Packet Company.
18 April	Volga	Yacht	Fyfe	Fairlie	United Kingdom	For private owner.
19 April	Albatross	Steamship	Messrs. Ramage & Ferguson	Leith	United Kingdom	For North British Steam Packet Company.
19 April	Craig Ard	Merchantman	Messrs. A. M'Millan & Son	Dumbarton	United Kingdom	For William M. Dickie.
19 April	Deanfield	Merchantman	Messrs. Russell & Co.	Port Glasgow	United Kingdom	For Messrs. R. M'Naughtan & Co.
19 April	Elgina	Steamship	Messrs. Murdoch & Murray	Port Glasgow	United Kingdom	For private owner.
20 April	Loch Leven	Steamship	Messrs. Gourlay Bros. & Co.	Dundee	United Kingdom	For Messrs. Ireland, Leith & Co.
April	Amethyst	Steamship	Messrs. Pearse & Co.	Stockton-on-Tees	United Kingdom	For Messrs. Telley & Co.
April	Emily	Steamship	Messrs. Readhead & Co.	South Shields	United Kingdom	For Robert Harrowing.
Unknown date	Fanny	Mersey flat	Brundrit & Co.	Runcorn	United Kingdom	For James Price.
April	Marten	Sloop	Brundrit & Co.	Runcorn	United Kingdom	For John Brundrit.
2 May	Meirion	Full-rigged ship	Mounsey & Foster	Sunderland	United Kingdom	For J. Thomas & Co.
6 May	Pilotin	Fishery protection vessel	Chantiers et Ateliers Augustin Normand	Le Havre	France	For French Navy
9 May	Helgoland	Ironclad	Orlogsværftet	Copenhagen	Denmark	For Royal Danish Navy.
10 May	Rosalyn	Steamship	Palmers Shipbuilding and Iron Company (Limited)	Jarrow	United Kingdom	For Messrs. J. Cory & Son.
13 May	Bayern	Sachsen-class ironclad	Kaiserliche Werft Wilhelmshaven	Wilhelmshaven	Germany	For Kaiserliche Marine.
16 May	Margaret	Steamship	Barrow Ship Building Co. Ltd.	Barrow-in-Furness	United Kingdom	For Carron Company.
16 May	State of California	Steamship		Philadelphia, Pennsylvania	United States	For private owner.
16 May	Vengeur	Ironclad		Brest	France	For French Navy.
22 May	Faugh-a-Ballagh	Steam barge	Harland & Wolff	Belfast	United Kingdom	For Dublin Harbour Board.
22 May	Holland I	Submarine	Albany Iron Works	New York / Paterson, New Jersey	United States	For John Philip Holland.
27 May	Pekalongan	Steamship	W. Simons & Co.	Renfrew	United Kingdom	For Dutch Government.
30 May	Dragon	Doterel-class sloop		Devonport Dockyard	United Kingdom	For Royal Navy.
30 May	Persian	Merchantman	Messrs. Scott & Co.	Greenock	United Kingdom	For Messrs. Orr, Wright & Co.
31 May	Mona	Steamship	William Laird & Co.	Birkenhead	United Kingdom	For Isle of Man Steam Packet Company.
May	Byculla	Steamship	Messrs. William Denny & Bros.	Dumbarton	United Kingdom	For British India Steam Navigation Company.
May	Devon	Steamship	James E. Scott	Cartsdyke	United Kingdom	For Messrs. Mark, Whitewell & Sons, or Great Western Steamship Line.
May	Dore	Tug	Messrs. Thomas Wingate & Co.	Whiteinch	United Kingdom	For Messrs. Winn & Co.
May	Dreamland	Schooner	Messrs. H. M'Intyre & Co.	Paisley	United Kingdom	For Messrs. Gillies & Reid.
May	Dunblane	Barque	Messrs. D. & W. Henderson & Co.	Partick	United Kingdom	For Messrs. James Dunn & Sons.
May	Gelderland	Steamship	Messrs. Raylton, Dixon & Co.	Middlesbrough	United Kingdom	For Partenreederij Stoomboot Reederij "Rotterdamsche Lloyd".
May	Hannah Landles	Barque	Messrs. A. Stephen & Sons	Linthouse	United Kingdom	For David Law.
May	Jacinth	Steamship	Messrs. Murdoch & Murray	Port Glasgow	United Kingdom	For private owner.
May	Kaiser-i Hind	Steamship	Messrs. Caird & Co.	Greenock	United Kingdom	For Peninsular and Oriental Steam Navigation Company.
May	Kilwa	Steamship	Messrs. A. & J. Inglis	Pointhouse	United Kingdom	For British India Steam Navigation Company.
May	Kinloch	Steamship	Messrs. A. & J. Inglis	Pointhouse	United Kingdom	For Campbeltown and Glasgow Steam Packet Company.
May	Loch Leven	Steamship	Messrs. Scott & M'Gill	Bowling	United Kingdom	For Messrs. William Sim & Co.
May	Lualaba	Steamship	Messrs. Blackwood & Gordon	Port Glasgow	United Kingdom	For British and African Steam Navigation Company.
May	Lyn	Paddle steamer	Messrs. Blackwood & Gordon	Port Glasgow	United Kingdom	For Portishead Steamship Co.
May	Madeira	Merchantman	Messrs. Russell & Co.	Port Glasgow	United Kingdom	For Messrs. P. Dennistoun & Co.
May	Nancy Lee	Cutter	Mr. Fife	Fairlie	United Kingdom	For George Coats.
May	Orient	Steam yacht	Messrs. John Reid & Co.	Port Glasgow	United Kingdom	For Peter M'Kinnon.
May	Rambler	Steamship	London and Glasgow Shipbuilding and Engineering Company	Glasgow	United Kingdom	For Messrs. H. Martini & Co.
May	Ras el Ech	Steam hopper barge	Messrs. Lobnitz, Coulborn & Co.	Renfrew	United Kingdom	For Suez Canal Company.
May	Silver Sea	Schooner	Edwin Barter	Brixham	United Kingdom	For John Browning and others.
May	Telephone	Schooner	David Banks & Co.	Plymouth	United Kingdom	For J. Westcott.
May	Vernon	Steamship	Blumer & Co	Sunderland	United Kingdom	For H. Wrightson.
May	Cigale	Wheeled aviso	Chantiers Dubigeon	Nantes	France	For French Navy
May	Wallaroo	Dredger	Messrs. William Simons & Co.	Renfrew	United Kingdom	For "Australian Government".
1 June	Gustav Bitter	Steamship	Messrs. C. S. Swan & Co.	Wallsend	United Kingdom	For Messrs. Fisher, Berwick & Co.
3 June	City of Khios	Steamship	Messrs. Barclay, Curle & Co.	location	United Kingdom	For Messrs. George Smith & Sons.
3 June	G. M. B.	Steamship	Messrs. Raylton, Dixon & Co.	Middlesbrough	United Kingdom	For Messrs. James Watson & Co.
3 June	Greta	Steam yacht	Messrs. Scott & Co.	Greenock	United Kingdom	For Messrs. J. & R. S. Scott.
3 June	Iris	Steamship	Messrs. Richardson, Duck & Co.	Stockton-on-Tees	United Kingdom	For Edward Leetham.
3 June	Mountstuart	Full-rigged ship	Messrs. Archibald M'Millan & Son	Dumbarton	United Kingdom	For Messrs. Hunter, Sheriff & Co.
3 June	Waterloo	Full-rigged ship	Messrs. Charles Connell & Co.	Scotstoun	United Kingdom	For Messrs. W. & A. Brown & Co.
4 June	Elsie Ker	Steamship	James Laing	Sunderland	United Kingdom	For Messrs G. R. Simkin & John Henderson.
4 June	Fez	Steamship	Messrs. Aitken & Mansel	Whiteinch	United Kingdom	For Mersey Steamship Co.
5 June	Hercules	Towboat	Messrs. Hamilton	Garston	United Kingdom	For F. J. Meyer.
6 Junee	Altyre	Steeamship	Mounsey & Foster	Sunderland	United Kingdom	For Messrs. Adam & Co.
6 June	Bothnia	Barque	Messrs. Birrell, Stenhouse & Co.	Dumbarton	United Kingdom	For Messrs. William Nicol & Co.
6 June	Narwhal	Tug	Messrs. Robert Duncan & Co.	Port Glasgow	United Kingdom	For Port-Glasgow Towing Co.
8 June	Herbert	Steam flat	W. Bracegirdle & Co.	Leftwich	United Kingdom	For Mr. Worthington.
10 June	Goolwa	Steamship	W. Simons & Co.	Renfrew	United Kingdom	For Government of South Australia.
10 June	Kadina	Steamship	W. Simons & Co.	Renfrew	United Kingdom	For Government of South Australia.
13 June	Humayta	Paddle steamer	Messrs. Murdoch & Murray	Port Glasgow	United Kingdom	For private owner.
13 June	Pegasus	Doterel-class sloop	Royal Dockyard	Devonport, Devon	United Kingdom	For Royal Navy.
15 June	Bayard	Steamship	Messrs. W. Pearse & Co.	Stockton-on-Tees	United Kingdom	For R. J. Kay.
15 June	Fastnet	Steamship	Messrs. Thomas Wingate & Co.	Whiteinch	United Kingdom	For Clyde Shipping Co.
15 June	Yoxford	Steamship	Messrs. C. Mitchell & Co.	Low Walker-on-Tyne	United Kingdom	For Messrs. Hunting & Pattison.
15 June	Zoe	Steamship	Thomas Turnbull & Co	Whitby	United Kingdom	For Messrs. Turner, Brightman & Co.
17 June	Circassia	Steamship	Messrs. William Gray & Co.	West Hartlepool	United Kingdom	For private owner.
17 June	Inventor	Steamship	Messrs. Aitken & Mansel	Whiteinch	United Kingdom	For Messrs. Thomas & James Harrison.
17 June	Shunlee	Steamship	Messrs. William Denny & Bros.	Dumbarton	United Kingdom	For Messrs. Jardine, Mathieson & Co.
18 June	Havik	Despatch vessel	Messrs. John Elder & Co.	Govan	United Kingdom	For Dutch Colonial Government.
18 June	Menai	Steamship	T. T. Parry	Bangor	United Kingdom	For private owner.
18 June	Paris	Steamship	Messrs. Scott & Co.	Greenock	United Kingdom	For London, Chatham and Dover Railway.
19 June	City of Columbus	Steamship	Delaware River Iron Ship Building and Engine Works	Chester, Pennsylvania	United States	For Boston and Savannah Steamship Company.
27 June	Alice Platt	Barque	Messrs. Alexander Stephen & Sons	Linthouse	United Kingdom	For John Lloyd Jr.
27 June	Promise	Ketch	Mr. Florence	Peterhead	United Kingdom	For private owner.
29 June	Lewis Castle	Barque		Stornoway	United Kingdom	For Alexander M'Kenzie. Formerly Gilsland, wrecked at Stornoway in November 1877 and rebuilt.
29 June	Reginald	Steamship	London & Glasgow Shipbuilding Company	Glasgow	United Kingdom	For Waterford Steamship Co.
30 June	River Lagan	Barque	Harland & Wolff	Belfast	United Kingdom	For R. Neill & Sons.
June	Ann	Smack	George Duncan	Macduff	United Kingdom	For James Watt.
Unknown date	Challenger	Ketch	Philip Bellot	Gorey	(United Kingdom of Great Britain and Ireland) Jersey	For William Sims & Co.
June	Deasil	Fishing smack	Mr. Keir	Musselburgh	United Kingdom	For Lady John Scott, for presentation to the Fair Islanders.
June	El Ferdane	Steam hopper barge	Messrs. Lobnitz, Coulborn & Co.	Renfrew	United Kingdom	For Suez Canal Company.
June	Futah	Merchantman	Messrs. Aitken & Mansel	Whiteinch	United Kingdom	For Messrs. Alexander Miller, Bros., & Co.
June	Glencairn	Merchantman	Messrs. Dobie & Co.	Govan	United Kingdom	For Allan Line.
June	Minnie	Steamboat	Messrs. H. & J. Scarr	Beverley	United Kingdom	For H. Munroe.
June	Moorcock	Steamship	Messrs. J. & G. Thompson	Dalmuir	United Kingdom	For private owner.
June	Roon	Steamship	Messrs. J. & G. Thompson	Dalmuir	United Kingdom	For Messrs. G. & J. Burns.
June	R. R. Thompson	Sternwheeler	J. J. Holland	The Dalles, Oregon	United States	For Oregon Steam Navigation Company.
June	Sovereign	Smack	George Duncan	Macduff	United Kingdom	For James Watt.
June	Zeemeeuw	Steamship	Messrs. John Elder & Co.	Govan	United Kingdom	For Dutch Colonial Government.
1 July	Champion	Comus-class corvette	J. Elder & Co	Glasgow	United Kingdom	For Royal Navy.
2 July	Inch Murren	Full-rigged ship	Messrs. Birrell, Stenhouse & Co.	Dumbarton	United Kingdom	For Clutha Shipping Co.
2 July	Virginia	Steam yacht	Paul Jones	Gourock	United Kingdom	For private owner.
3 July	Loch Awe	Steamship	Messrs. Gourlay Bros. & Co.	Dundee	United Kingdom	For Messrs. Ireland, Leitch & Co.
6 July	Conestoga	Steamship	Quale & Son	Cleveland, Ohio	United States	For Anchor Line.
6 July	Scottish Prince	Barque	Messrs. A. Hall & Co.	Footdee	United Kingdom	For Messrs. M'Ilwraith, M'Eachran & Co.
9 July	Alexa	Barque	Osbourne, Graham & Co	Hylton	United Kingdom	For G. Turnbull & Co.
10 July	Enrico Dandolo	Duilio-class ironclad		La Spezia	Italy	For Regia Marina.
12 July	Rainos	Steamship	Messrs. Cunliffe & Dunlop	Port Glasgow	United Kingdom	For British and African Steam Navigation Co.
13 July	Castlewood	Steamship	Messrs. A. Lesliee & Co	Hebburn	United Kingdom	For Messrs. Chapman & Miller.
15 July	Danish Monarch	Steamship	Messrs. Wigham, Richardson & Co.	Low Walker	United Kingdom	For Messrs. John Patten Jr., & Co.
16 July	Banjō	Gunboat	Yokosuka Naval Arsenal	Yokosuka	Japan	For Imperial Japanese Navy.
16 July	Benan	Steamship	Whitehaven Shipbuilding Co.	Whitehaven	United Kingdom	For Joseph Holt.
16 July	Cornishman	Steamship	Messrs. Schlesinger, Davis & Co.	Wallsend	United Kingdom	For Messrs. Short & Dunn.
16 July	Ottercaps	Collier	Robert Thompson Jr.	Sunderland	United Kingdom	For Henry T. Morton and others.
16 July	Bar Flat	Lightship	Messrs. Schlesinger, Davis & Co.	Wallsend	United Kingdom	For Corporation of King's Lynn.
17 July	Trocadero	Steamship	Messrs. H. M'Intyre & Co.	Merksworth	United Kingdom	For Messrs. Dunsey & Robinson.
23 July	Rapido	Paddle steamer	Messrs. Henry Murray & Co	Port Glasgow	United Kingdom	For National Brazilian Navigation Steam Co.
29 July	Adjutant	Steamship	Messrs. Barclay, Curle & Co.	Whiteinch	United Kingdom	For Messrs. Seater, White & Co.
30 July	Banjoemas	Steamship	W. Simons & Co.	Renfrew	United Kingdom	For Dutch Government.
30 July	Torpilleur N° 20	27-metre type Normand (1877 batch) torpedo boat	Chantiers et Ateliers Augustin Normand	Le Havre	France	For French Navy
30 July	Derwentwater	Steamship	Messrs. C. S. Swan & Co.	Wallsend	United Kingdom	For Messrs. H. Strachan & Co.
31 July	Borinquen	Steamship	Messrs. R. & J. Evans & Co.	Liverpool	United Kingdom	For Messrs. White, Forman & Co.
31 July	Pourvoyeur	Transport	Arsenal de Lorient	Lorient	France	For French Navy
31 July	Cicero	Steamship	Barrow Ship Building Co. Ltd.	Barrow-in-Furness	United Kingdom	For W. H. Dixon.
31 July	Lady Cecelia	Schooner	Messrs. Stephen & Forbes	Aberdeen	United Kingdom	For Messrs. Robert H. Mitchell & Co.
31 July	Monarch	Steamship	Messrs. Raylton, Dixon & Co.	Middlesbrough	United Kingdom	For Messrs. Hutchinson & M'Intyre.
July	Ant	Yacht		West Cowes	United Kingdom	For private owner.
July	Cyprus	Thames barge		London	United Kingdom	For private owner.
July	Siberia	Schooner		Tjumen	Russia	For private owner.
1 August	Cleopatra	Comus-class corvette	John Elder & Co.	Govan	United Kingdom	For Royal Navy.
1 August	Isabella	Schooner	William Ashburner	Barrow-in-Furness	United Kingdom	For Thomas Ashburner.
1 August	Purulia	Steamship	Messrs. A. & J. Inglis	Pointhouse	United Kingdom	For British India Steam Navigation Company.
1 August	Victory	Steamship	Messrs. Murdoch & Murray	Port Glasgow	United Kingdom	For private owner.
2 August	Amsterdam	Steamship	Messrs. Birrell, Stenhouse & Co.	Dumbarton	United Kingdom	For Messrs. James Rankine & Sons.
3 August	Rialto	Ocean liner	Earle's Shipbuilding and Engineering Company (Limited)	Hull	United Kingdom	For Messrs. Thomas Wilson, Sons, & Co.
14 August	Pampa	Steamship	Forges et Chantiers de la Méditerranée	La Seyne	France	For Cie. Française de Navigation à Vapeur Chargeurs Réunis
15 August	Annandale	Steamship	Messrs. Edward Withy & Co	Middleton	United Kingdom	For private owner.
15 August	Ardantiene	Steamship	Messrs. Henry Murray & Co.	Kingston	United Kingdom	For Messrs. MacLaren, Crum & Co.
15 August	Goethe	Barque	Messrs. Alexander Stephen & Sons	Linthouse	United Kingdom	For Messrs D. H. Wätjen & Co.
15 August	Krishna	Steamship	Messrs. Thomas Wingate & Co.	Whiteinch	United Kingdom	For J. A. Shepherd.
15 August	Neptune	Steam hopper barge	Messrs. William Simons & Co.	Renfrew	United Kingdom	For Newhaven Harbour Commissioners.
15 August	Umberto I	Steamship	Messrs. A. M'Millan & Sons	Dumbarton	United Kingdom	For Messrs. Eoccho Piaggio & Son.
17 August	Solent	Steamship	Messrs. Oswald, Mordaunt & Co.	Southampton	United Kingdom	For Royal Mail Line.
27 August	Broomhill	Steamship	Messrs. Thomas Wingate & Co.	Whiteinch	United Kingdom	For R. Taylor.
29 August	Dunkeld	Steamship	Messrs. Robert Napier & Sons	Govan	United Kingdom	For Messrs. Donald Currie & Co.
29 August	Dunscore	Full-rigged ship	William Doxford & Sons	Sunderland	United Kingdom	For John Houston & Co.
29 August	Lancashire Witch	Steam yacht	R. Steele & Co.	Greenock	United Kingdom	For Thomas George Fermor-Hesketh.
29 August	L. E. Charlewood	Steamship	Palmer's Iron and Shipbuilding Co.	Jarrow-on-Tyne	United Kingdom	For Messrs. Lee & Finch.
31 August	Dotterel	Steamship	Messrs. W. H. Potter & Co.	Liverpool	United Kingdom	For Cork Steamship Co.
31 August	Gannet	Doterel-class sloop	Royal Dockyard	Sheerness	United Kingdom	For Royal Navy.
31 August	Liburnian	Steamship	Messrs. William Gray & Co.	West Hartlepool	United Kingdom	For Messrs. J. Lidgitt & Son.
31 August	'Patterdale	Steamship	Short Bros.	Pallion	United Kingdom	For Milburn Bros.
August	Azalea	Steamship	Messrs. A. & J. Inglis	Pointhouse	United Kingdom	For Glasgow and Londonderry Steam Packet Company.
August	Cartsburn	Steamship	Messrs. William Swan & Sons	Maryhill	United Kingdom	For D. R. Gaff.
August	Cartsdyke	Steamship	Messrs. William Swan & Sons	Maryhill	United Kingdom	For D. R. Gaff.
August	Dauno	Steamship	Messrs. H. M'Intyre & Co.	Paisley	United Kingdom	For private owner.
August	Geneva	Steamship	Messrs. Blackwood & Gordon	Port Glasgow	United Kingdom	For Messrs. James Currie & Co.
August	Melanesia	Merchantman	Messrs. Russell & Co.	Port Glasgow	United Kingdom	For Messrs. J. & W. Goffey.
August	Pretoria	Steamship	Messrs. William Denny & Bros.	Dumbarton	United Kingdom	For Union Steamship Co.
August	Razboinik	Kreiser-class frigate	New Admiralty Shipyard	Saint Petersburg	Russia	For Imperial Russian Navy.
August	Susu	Steamship	Messrs. William Hamilton & Co.	Port Glasgow	United Kingdom	For private owner.
August	Terranora	Paddle tug	Messrs. D. & W. Henderson & Co.	Partick	United Kingdom	For Colonial Sugar Refining Co.
August	Wistow Hall	Steamship	Messrs. Charles Connell & Co.	Scotstoun	United Kingdom	For Messrs. Alexander & Ratcliffe.
3 September	Felixtowe Pier	Steam launch	Mr. Curtis	Ipswich	United Kingdom	For Mr. Hammond.
12 September	Chamois	Steamship	Messrs. E. Withy & Co.	Middleton	United Kingdom	For Messrs. Cory, Lohden & Jacksons.
14 September	Fay	Schooner	Messrs. Gowan & Wilson	Berwick-upon-Tweed	United Kingdom	For Messrs. Gillies & Reed.
14 September	Sylph	Schooner	Nathaniel Porter Keen	North Weymouth, Massachusetts	United States	For A. Nash & Co.
14 September	Telephone	Steamship	Messrs. John Duthie, Sons, & Co.	Aberdeen	United Kingdom	For Messrs. James Aiken, Jr. & Co.
17 September	Spearman	Steamship	James Laing	Sunderland	United Kingdom	For W. J. Jobling.
26 September	Carysfort	Comus-class corvette	Messrs. John Elder & Co.	Govan	United Kingdom	For Royal Navy.
26 September	Loch Earn	Steamship	Messrs. Gourlay Bros. & Co	Dundee	United Kingdom	For Messrs. Ireland, Leitch & Co.
26 September	Sunbeam	Steamship	Messrs. Richardson, Duck & Co.	South Stockton	United Kingdom	For Messrs. Cammell, Woolf & Haigh.
28 September	Dunmore	Steamship	Messrs. James & George Thompson	Clydebank	United Kingdom	For Clyde Shipping Co.
28 September	Felinheli	Schooner	Messrs. R. & W. Jones	Portdinorwic	United Kingdom	For Messrs. Dean.
28 September	G. W. Wolff	Sailing ship	Harland & Wolff	Belfast	United Kingdom	For S. Lawther & Co.
28 September	Lord Nelson	Steamship	Messrs. C. S. Swan & Co.	Wallsend	United Kingdom	For Messrs. Charles Tully & Co.
28 September	MacBeth	Full-rigged ship	Messrs. A. M'Millan & Son	Dumbarton	United Kingdom	For Messrs. A M'Millan & Son.
28 September	Rokeby	Steamship	Messrs. Palmer's Shipbuilding and Iron Co.	Jarrow-on-Tyne	United Kingdom	For Messrs. J. Cory & Son.
30 September	Lurline	Sternwheeler	Jacob Kamm	Oregon City, Oregon	United States	For Vancouver Transportation Co.
30 September	Maid of the Moy	Steamship	Messrs. Aitken & Mansel	Whiteinch	United Kingdom	For Ballina Harbour Commissioners.
September	Anglian	Steamship	Messrs. Murdoch & Murray	Port Glasgow	United Kingdom	For Messrs. J. & J. Macfarlane.
September	Ballydoon	Steamship	Messrs. H. Macintyre & Co	Paisley	United Kingdom	For Messrs. William Reid & Co.
September	Bengloe	Steamship	Messrs. Barclay, Curle & Co.	Whiteinch	United Kingdom	For Messrs. William Thompson & Co.
September	Clan Alpine	Steamship	Messrs. Alexander Stephen & Sons	Linthouse	United Kingdom	For Clan Line.
September	Fiery Cross	East Indiaman	Messrs. Charles Connell & Co.	Scotstoun	United Kingdom	For Messrs. J. D. Clink & others.
September	Neera	Steamship	Messrs. T. Wingate & Co.	Whiteinch	United Kingdom	For J. A. Shepherd.
September	Samarang	Steamship	Messrs. William Simon & Co.	Renfrew	United Kingdom	For Dutch Government.
September	Selkirkshire	Barque	Messrs. Birrell, Stenhouse & Co.	Dumbarton	United Kingdom	For Messrs. Thomas Law & Co.
September	Sheay la Yung	Tug	Messrs. John Reid & Co.	Port Glasgow	United Kingdom	For Messrs. Joseph Heep & Sons.
1 October	Tyrant	Fishing smack	George Brown	Wilmington	United Kingdom	For James William Fellowes.
2 October	Graphic	Steamship	Messrs. H. M'Intyre & Co.	Paisley	United Kingdom	For T. R. Dunlop.
3 October	Ben Ledi	Paddle tug	Messrs. Hall, Russell & Co.	Footdee	United Kingdom	For James Gibb.
3 October	Rockabill	Steamship	Messrs. Thomas Wingate & Co.	Whiteinch	United Kingdom	For Clyde Shipping Co.
10 October	Moldart	Steamship	Messrs. Edward Withy & Co.	Middleton	United Kingdom	For Messrs. James Gardiner & Co.
10 October	Union	Tug	Messrs. Aitken & Mansel	Whiteinch	United Kingdom	For Union Steamship Co.
12 October	Dom Pedro	Steamship	Forges et Chantiers de la Méditerranée	Le Havre	France	For Cie. Française de Navigation à Vapeur Chargeurs Réunis
12 October	Manuela	Steamship	Messrs. Oswald, Mordaunt & Co.	Southampton	United Kingdom	For Messrs. G. H. Fletcher & Co.
12 October	Mary	Pilot cutter	Messrs. J. & J. Cooper	Pill	United Kingdom	For J. Brown.
12 October	Westland	Merchantman	Messrs. Robert Duncan & Co.	Port Glasgow	United Kingdom	For Messrs. P. Henderson & Co.
15 October	Chilka	Steamship	Messrs. William Denny & Bros.	Dumbarton	United Kingdom	For British India Steam Navigation Company (Limited).
15 October	Tonquin	Tonquin-class Troopship	Forges et Chantiers de la Méditerranée	La Seyne	France	For French Navy.
15 October	Nièvre	Allier-class transport	Arsenal de Cherbourg	Cherbourg	France	For French Navy
15 October	County of Selkirk	Merchantman	Messrs. Barclay, Curle & Co.	Whiteinch	United Kingdom	For Messrs. R. & J. Craig.
15 October	Tegetthoff	Ironclad	Stabilimento Tecnico Triestino	Trieste	Austria-Hungary	For Austro-Hungarian Navy.
16 October	Eilean-dubh	Steamship	Messrs. Alexander Stephen & Sons	Linthouse	United Kingdom	For D. MacPherson.
23 October	Nor	Vale-class gunboat	Karljohansverns Verft	Horten	Norway	For Royal Norwegian Navy.
24 October	Horace	Steamship	Messrs. John Readhead & Sons	South Shields	United Kingdom	For Messrs. Groves, Maclean & Co.
25 October	Regulus	Steamship	Tyne Iron Shipbuilding Co.	Willington Quay	United Kingdom	For Messrs. Stephens, Mawson & Co.
25 October	Wilfred	Steamship	Messrs. Thomas Turnbull & Son	Whitby	United Kingdom	For Messrs. Thomas Turnbull & Son.
26 October	Congress	Steamship	Messrs. Raylton, Dixon & Co.	Middlesbrough	United Kingdom	For Henry Pease.
26 October	Glenburgie	Steamship	Palmer's Shipbuilding and Iron Company, Limited	Jarrow-on-Tyne	United Kingdom	For Messrs. Lindsay, Gracie & Co.
26 October	Marathon	Steamship	W. B. Thompson	Dundee	United Kingdom	For Messrs. David Scott & Son.
26 October	Regulus	Steamship	Tyne Iron Shipbuilding Co.	Newcastle upon Tyne	United Kingdom	For Stephens & Mawson.
28 October	Conquest	Comus-class corvette	Messrs. John Elder & Co.	Govan	United Kingdom	For Royal Navy.
28 October	Rathmore	Steamship	William Doxford & Sons	Sunderland	United Kingdom	For William Johnston & Co., or The Saint Andrew's Steamship Co Ltd.
29 October	Birkhall	Steamship	Messrs. Hall, Russell & Co.	Footdee	United Kingdom	For Messrs. J. & A. Davidson & Co.
30 October	Abercarron	Steamship	Messrs. Hurn, M'Intyre & Co.	Merksworth	United Kingdom	For George G. Mackay.
30 October	Devaar	Steamship	Campbeltown Shipbuilding Company	Campbeltown	United Kingdom	For Messrs. Dale, Lowden & Co.
30 October	Gem	Steamship	Messrs. John Fullerton & Co.	Paisley	United Kingdom	For Messrs. Lees, Anderson & Co, or Messrs. Mitchell & Rae.
October	Abercorn	Steamship	Messrs. H. M'Intyre & Co.	Paisley	United Kingdom	For private owner.
October	Ardmillan	Merchantman	Messrs. Dobie & Co.	Govan	United Kingdom	For Allan Line.
October	Glenelg	Steamship	Messrs. Blackwood & Gordon	Port Glasgow	United Kingdom	For private owner.
October	Kelburne	Coaster	Abercorn Shipbuilding Co.	Paisley	United Kingdom	For George Clark.
October	Nayezdnik	Kreiser-class frigate	New Admiralty Shipyard	Saint Petersburg	Russia	For Imperial Russian Navy.
October	Pomona	Steamship	Messrs. John Fullerton & Co.	Paisley	United Kingdom	For private owner.
October	Suppicich	Steamship	Messrs. Schlesinger, Davis & Co.	Wallsend	United Kingdom	For Messrs. Angier Bros.
October	Thorne	Merchantman	Robert Thompson Jr.	Sunderland	United Kingdom	For Dixon, Irwin & Co.
1 November	Brage	Vale-class gunboat	Karljohansverns Verft	Horten	Norway	For Royal Norwegian Navy.
1 November	Seagull	Steamship	Messrs. Blackwood & Gordon	Port Glasgow	United Kingdom	For private owner.
6 November	Truthful	Steamship	Barrow Ship Building Co. Ltd.	Barrow-in-Furness	United Kingdom	For F. H. Powell & Co.
9 November	Bheema	Steamship	Messrs. Thomas Wingate & Co.	Whiteinch	United Kingdom	For J. A. Shepherd.
9 November	Gunga	Steamship	Messrs. Thomas Wingate & Co.	Whiteinch	United Kingdom	For J. A. Shepherd.
9 November	Nubia	Cargo ship	Harland & Wolff	Belfast	United Kingdom	For African Steamship Company.
9 November	Württemberg	Sachsen-class ironclad	A. G. Vulcan	Stettin	Germany	For Kaiserliche Marine.
12 November	Casma	Steamship	Messrs. Laird Bros.	Birkenhead	United Kingdom	For Pacific Steam Navigation Company.
12 November	Gallia	Ocean liner	Messrs J. & G. Thomson	Dalmuir	United Kingdom	For Cunard Line.
15 November	Charles Worsley	Full-rigged ship	Messrs. A. M'Millan & Son	Dumbarton	United Kingdom	For W. Battersby.
18 November	Torpilleur N° 21	27-metre type Normand (1877 batch) torpedo boat	Chantiers et Ateliers Augustin Normand	Le Havre	France	For French Navy
16 November	Boulogne	Steamship	Earle's Shipbuilding and Engineering Co.	Hull	United Kingdom	For South Eastern Railway.
19 November	Trewidden	Steamship	John Readhead & Sons Ltd.	South Shields	United Kingdom	For Hain Line.
23 November	Marlborough	Steamship	Bartram, Haswell & Co.	Sunderland	United Kingdom	For D. P. Garbutt.
23 November	Nicosian	Steamship	Messrs. Edward Withy & Co.	Middleton	United Kingdom	For Messrs. Hugh Blaik & Co.
26 November	Ciudad de Cádiz	Steamship	Messrs. Lobnitz, Coulborn & Co.	Renfrew	United Kingdom	For Antonion Lopez & Co.
26 November	Egypt	Steamship	Messrs. Wigham, Richardson & Co.	Newcastle upon tyne	United Kingdom	For private owner.
26 November	Princess of Wales	Steam launch	London Steamboat Company	Woolwich	United Kingdom	For London Steamboat Company.
27 November	Lord Gough	Steamship	Messrs. Laird Bros.	Birkenhead	United Kingdom	For Messrs. G. M. Papayanni & Son.
27 November	Northbourne	Merchantman	Robert Thompson Jr.	Sunderland	United Kingdom	For D. P. Garbutt.
27 November	North Devon	Steamship	Messrs. Schlesinger, Davis & Co.	Wallsend	United Kingdom	For Messrs. H. Vellacott & Son.
28 November	Adela	Steamship	Messrs. Henry Murray & Co.	Kingston	United Kingdom	For Messrs. R. Tedcastle & Co.
November	Aros Castle	Steamship	Messrs. Blackwood & Gordon	Port Glasgow	United Kingdom	For private owner.
November	Arran	Dredger	Messrs. Murdoch & Murray	Port Glasgow	United Kingdom	For Atlas Steamship Co.
November	Cedar	Steamship	Messrs. D. & W. Henderson	Partick	United Kingdom	For Messrs. A. A. Laird & Co.
November	Chupra	Steamship	Messrs. William Denny & Bros.	Dumbarton	United Kingdom	For British India Steam Naviagtion Company.
November	Clan Fraser	Steamship	Messrs. Alexander Stephen & Sons	Linthouse	United Kingdom	For Clan Line.
November	County of Haddington	Full-rigged ship	Messrs. Barclay, Curle & Co.	Whiteinch	United Kingdom	For Messrs. R. & J. Craig.
November	Felecia	Steamship	Messrs. Alexand Stephen & Sons	Linthouse	United Kingdom	For Messrs. A. C. de Freitas & Co.
November	Flinders	Steamship	Messrs. A. & J. Inglis	Partick	United Kingdom	For Tasmanian Steam Navigation Company.
November	Glencoe	Steamship	London and Glasgow Shipbuilding Co.	Govan	United Kingdom	For Glen Line.
Unknown date	Linda	Ketch	C. Burt & Sons	Falmouth	United Kingdom	For Norman Gray.
November	Lord Sandon	Steam launch	Messrs. Thomas B. Seath & Co.	Rutherglen	United Kingdom	For Trinity House.
November	St. Mark	Steamship			United Kingdom	For private owner.
November	Tolfaen	Steamship	W. Allsup & Sons	Preston	United Kingdom	For Henry Kneeshaw.
November	Zannekka	Steam launch	Messrs. Thomas B. Seath & Co.	Rutherglen	United Kingdom	For Mr. Layborn.
5 December	Drac	Allier-class transport	Arsenal de Toulon	Toulon	France	For French Navy
9 December	Sowerby	Steamship	Messrs. William Gray & Co.	West Hartlepool	United Kingdom	For Messrs. Middleton & Co.
10 December	Lady Olive	Steamship	Messrs. A. & J. Inglis	Pointhouse	United Kingdom	For British and Irish Steam Packet Co.
10 December	Saxonia	Steamship	Messrs. Caird & Co.	Greenock	United Kingdom	For Hamburg-Amerikanische Packetfahrt-Actien-Gesellschaft.
12 December	Breconshire	Steamship	London and Glasgow Shipbuilding Co.	Govan	United Kingdom	For Messrs. Jenkins & Co.
12 December	Falls of Clyde	Full-rigged tanker	Russell & Co.	Port Glasgow	United Kingdom	For Falls Line.
12 December	Rodondo	Steamship	Messrs. W. H. Potter & Co.	Liverpool	United Kingdom	For W. H. Smith.
12 December	Wanderer	Steam Yacht	Messrs. R. Steele & Co.	Greenock	United Kingdom	For Charles Joseph Lambert.
14 December	Chalor	Steamship	Messrs. Laird Bros.	Birkenhead	United Kingdom	For Pacific Steam Navigation Company.
14 December	Le Crouset	Steamship	John Blumer & Co	Sunderland	United Kingdom	For Delmas Frères. Ran into quayside on being launched and was damaged.
21 December	Camaeleon	Gunboat		Bremen	Germany	For Imperial German Navy.
24 December	Belgenland	Steamship	Barrow Shipbuilding Co.	Barrow-in-Furness	United Kingdom	For Red Star Line.
24 December	Cephalonia	Steamship	Messrs. Raylton, Dixon & Co	Middlesbrough	United Kingdom	For Messrs. Vagliano Bros.
24 December	Clan Ranald	Steamship	Messrs. A. M'Millan & Son	Dumbarton	United Kingdom	For Clan Line.
24 December	Herga	Collier	Messrs. Cunliffe & Dunlop	Port Glasgow	United Kingdom	For Alexander Stuart.
24 December	Hilda	Collier	Messrs. Cunliffe & Dunlop	Port Glasgow	United Kingdom	For Alexander Stuart.
24 December	Jesmond	Steamship	Messrs. C. Mitchell & Co.	Low Walker	United Kingdom	For E. H. Watts.
24 December	Montanez	Steamship	Messrs. Gowans & Wilson	Berwick upon Tweed	United Kingdom	For Messrs MacAndrews & Co.
24 December	Shahjehan	Cargo ship	Harland & Wolff	Belfast	United Kingdom	For Asiatic Steamship Co.
24 December	Snark	Steam launch	Messrs. William Denny & Bros	Dumbarton	United Kingdom	For Messrs. Brock.
25 December	Congress	Steamship	Messrs. H. M'Intyre & Co	Merksworth	United Kingdom	For Messrs. Leech, Harrison & Forward.
26 December	Valeau	Steamship	Hamilton Windsor Ironworks, Limited	Garston	United Kingdom	For F. J. Meyer.
December	Penzance	Steamship	Messrs. Schlesinger, Davis & Co.	Wallsend	United Kingdom	For Messrs. Short & Dunn.
Spring	Condor	Yawl	Fyfe	Fairlie	United Kingdom	For J. Clark.
Summer	Irish Chieftain	Merchantman	Mr. Cormick	Dundalk	United Kingdom	For private owner.
Unknown date	Ability	Ketch	William Woodward	Brisbane Water	New South Wales	For private owner.
Unknown date	A. C. de Freitas	Merchantman	Messrs. Thomas Royden & Sons	Liverpool	United Kingdom	For A. R. F. de Freitas.
Unknown date	Agate	Steamship	Messrs. T. B. Seath & Co.	Rutherglen	United Kingdom	For private owner.
Unknown date	Albirio	Merchantman	Mounsey & Foster	Sunderland	United Kingdom	For R. H. Penney.
Unknown date	Alcyon	Steamship	Messrs. Blackwood & Gordon	Port Glasgow	United Kingdom	For private owner.
Unknown date	Alvah	Steamship	Mounsey & Foster	Sunderland	United Kingdom	For Messrs. Adam Bros., & Co.
Unknown date	Annie. E. Gallup	Fishing trawler		Fall River, Massachusetts	United Kingdom	For private owner.
Unknown date	Annie Stuart	Merchantman	John Duncan	Kingston	United Kingdom	For private owner.
Unknown date	Augustus	Steamship	Messrs. Alexander Stephen & Sons	Linthouse	United Kingdom	For private owner.
Unknown date	Avalon	Barque	Messrs. Robert Steele & Co.	Greenock	United Kingdom	For private owner.
Unknown date	Averill	Steamship	Messrs. William Gray & Co.	West Hartlepool	United Kingdom	For private owner.
Unknown date	Ballina	Coaster	Barrow Ship Building Co. Ltd.	Barrow-in-Furness	United Kingdom	For Charles W. Pollexten and George T. Pollexten.
Unknown date	Barnard Castle	Merchantman	James Laing	Sunderland	United Kingdom	For Northumberland Steamship Co. Ltd.
Unknown date	Bay of Cadiz	Merchantman	Messrs. J. & G. Thompson	Dalmuir	United Kingdom	For private owner.
Unknown date	Beech	Merchantman	Blumer & Co	Sunderland	United Kingdom	For Peacock Bros.
Unknown date	Belsize	Steamship	Joseph L. Thompson	Sunderland	United Kingdom	For Culliford & Clark.
Unknown date	Benamain	Steamship	Messrs. Hall, Russell & Co.	Aberdeen	United Kingdom	For private owner.
Unknown date	Ben Lawers	Merchantman	Messrs. Russell & Co.	Port Glasgow	United Kingdom	For private owner.
Unknown date	Bismarck	Steamship	Messrs. T. B. Seath & Co.	Rutherglen	United Kingdom	For private owner.
Unknown date	Britannia	Yacht	Messrs. T. B. Seath & Co.	Rutherglen	United Kingdom	For private owner.
Unknown date	Caledonia	Merchantman	William Pickersgill	Sunderland	United Kingdom	For Duncan & Co.
Unknown date	Caroline	Steamship	Messrs. Thomas Royden & Sons	Liverpool	United Kingdom	For Carron Company.
Unknown date	Casina	Steamship	Messrs. Laird Bros	Birkenhead	United Kingdom	For Pacific Steam Navigation Company.
Unknown date	Cavalier	Merchantman	William Doxford & Sons	Sunderland	United Kingdom	For Duncan & Co.
Unknown date	Celerity	Tender	Messrs. Raylton, Dixon & Co.	Middlesbrough	United Kingdom	For Great Grimsby Ice Co.
Unknown date	Ceto	Steamship	Messrs. M. Pearse & Co.	Stockton-on-Tees	United Kingdom	For private owner.
Unknown date	Cheribon	Steamship	W. Simons & Co.	Renfrew	United Kingdom	For private owner.
Unknown date	Cheseborough	Full-rigged ship	Arthur Sewall & Co.	Bath, Maine	United States	For E. & A. Sewall.
Unknown date	Chicago	Steamship	Messrs. William Gray & Co.	West Hartlepool	United Kingdom	For private owner.
Unknown date	Clan Fraser	Steamship	Messrs. Alexander Stephen & Sons	Linthouse	United Kingdom	For Clan Line.
Unknown date	Colaba	Steamship	Messrs. William Denny & Bros.	Dumbarton	United Kingdom	For private owner.
Unknown date	Consul	Merchantman	Joseph L. Thompson	Sunderland	United Kingdom	For Gordon & Stamp.
Unknown date	Craigard	Barque	Messrs. A. M'Millan & Sons	Dumbarton	United Kingdom	For private owner.
Unknown date	Craigwhinnie	Barque	Messrs. R. & J. Evans & Co.	Liverpool	United Kingdom	For private owner.
Unknown date	Cricket	Merchantman	J. J. Gibbon	Sunderland	United Kingdom	For W. C. Jarvis.
Unknown date	Crimdon	Steamship	Messrs. William Gray & Co.	West Hartlepool	United Kingdom	For private owner.
Unknown date	Crown	Merchantman	Joseph L. Thompson	Sunderland	United Kingdom	For Crown Shipping Co.
Unknown date	Cymba	Merchantman	Messrs. Walter Hood & Co.	Aberdeen	United Kingdom	For private owner.
Unknown date	Dawdon	Merchantman	Short Bros.	Sunderland	United Kingdom	For Robert Thorman.
Unknown date	Deerhound	Tug	W. Allsup & Sons	Preston	United Kingdom	For private owner.
Unknown date	Deva	Steam yacht	W. Allsup & Sons	Preston	United Kingdom	For C. & H. McIver.
Unknown date	Diamante	Steamship	Messrs. Hall, Russel & Co.	Aberdeen	United Kingdom	For Messrs. Peele, Hubball & Co.
Unknown date	Diligent	Merchantman	Bartram, Haswell & Co	Sunderland	United Kingdom	For J. Westoll.
Unknown date	Dispatch	Tender	Messrs. Raylton, Dixon & Co.	Middlesbrough	United Kingdom	For Great Grimsby Ice Co.
Unknown date	Doowoon	Steamship	Messrs. William Denny & Bros.	Dumbarton	United Kingdom	For private owner.
Unknown date	Duncow	Full-rigged ship	William Doxford & Sons	Sunderland	United Kingdom	For John Houston & Co.
Unknown date	Eastbourne	Merchantman	Robert Thompson Jr.	Sunderland	United Kingdom	For D. P. Garbutt.
Unknown date	Effective	Merchantman	Short Bros.	Sunderland	United Kingdom	For Anderson, Horan & Co.
Unknown date	Eleanor & Jane	Merchantman	William Pickersgill	Sunderland	United Kingdom	For D. Davies & Co.
Unknown date	Elpis	Steamship	Messrs. William Gray & Co.	West Hartlepool	United Kingdom	For private owner.
Unknown date	Emulator	Merchantman	William Kinloch	Kingston	United Kingdom	For private owner.
Unknown date	Enterprise	Paddle steamer	William Keir	Echuca	Victoria	For William Keir.
Unknown date	Ernest	Fishing trawler	Edwin Barter	Brixham	United Kingdom	For William Lear and others.
Unknown date	Etheldreda	Steamship	A. & J. Inglis	Partick	United Kingdom	For private owner.
Unknown date	Ethelwin	Merchantman	Osbourne, Graham & Co	Sunderland	United Kingdom	For A. Pring.
Unknown date	Fernville	Steamship	Messrs. William Gray & Co.	West Hartlepool	United Kingdom	For private owner.
Unknown date	Felicia	Steamship	Messrs. Alexander Stephen & Sons	Linthouse	United Kingdom	For private owner.
Unknown date	Fiado	Merchantman	Robert Thomson Jr.	Sunderland	United Kingdom	For Alpha Steamship Co.
Unknown date	Fifeshire	Steamship	Messrs. William Hamilton & Co.	Port Glasgow	United Kingdom	For private owner.
Unknown date	Florence Nightingale	Merchantman	Osbourne, Graham & Co.	Sunderland	United Kingdom	For J. F. Marshall.
Unknown date	Foula	Merchantman	James Laing	Sunderland	United Kingdom	For M. C. A. Verminck.
Unknown date	Foxglove	Merchantman	James Laing	Sunderland	United Kingdom	For R. H. Gaymer.
Unknown date	Fulah	Paddle steamer	Messrs. Aitken & Mansel	Whiteinch	United Kingdom	For private owner.
Unknown date	Gallina	Merchantman	Mounsey & Foster	Sunderland	United Kingdom	For Porteous & Senier.
Unknown date	Galnare	Steamship	Messrs. Charles Connel & Co.	Scotstoun	United Kingdom	For private owner.
Unknown date	George E. Starr	Paddle steamer	J. F. T. Mitchell	Seattle, Washington	(United States) Washington Territory	For Starr Line.
Unknown date	George Leed	Schooner	Robert Stewart	Inverness	United Kingdom	For George Leed.
Unknown date	Glanivor	Merchantman	William Doxford & Sons	Sunderland	United Kingdom	For Eryni Shipping Co.
Unknown date	Glaucus	Steamship	James Laing	Sunderland	United Kingdom	For Thomas Kish & Co.
Unknown date	Glenboyne	Barquentine	Messrs. J. Watson & Sons	Macduff	United Kingdom	For private owner.
Unknown date	Glow-worm	Steam yacht	W. Allsup & Sons	Preston	United Kingdom	For J. R. Bridsom.
Unknown date	Govino	Merchantman	James Laing	Sunderland	United Kingdom	For D. G. Pinkney & Son.
Unknown date	Gowan	Schooner	Messrs. Geddie	Banff	United Kingdom	For George Macdonald and others.
Unknown date	Harvest Queen	Sternwheeler		Celilo, Oregon	United States	For Oregon Steam Navigation Company.
Unknown date	Hart	Steamship	Messrs. William Gray & Co.	West Hartlepool	United Kingdom	For private owner.
Unknown date	Hathersage	Steamship	Messrs. William Gray & Co.	West Hartlepool	United Kingdom	For private owner.
Unknown date	Heathpool	Merchantman	A. Simey	Sunderland	United Kingdom	For H. T. Morton.
Unknown date	Helen West	Schooner	Messrs. Watson	Banff	United Kingdom	For Mr. West and others.
Unknown date	Herman S. Caswell	Yacht		Noank, Connecticut	United States	For private owner.
Unknown date	Hohenzollern	Royal yacht	Norddeutsche Schiffbau-Gesellschaft	Kiel	Germany	For Wilhelm I.
Unknown date	Hubia	Steamship	Harland & Wolff	Belfast	United Kingdom	For private owner.
Unknown date	Hudson	Steamship	Messrs. William Gray & Co.	West Hartlepool	United Kingdom	For private owner.
Unknown date	Hurricane	Steamship	Messrs. Robert Napier & Sons	Govan	United Kingdom	For private owner.
Unknown date	Illeri	Brigantine			Norway	For P. Tobiassen.
Unknown date	Inchkeith	Merchantman	Messrs. Barclay, Curle & Co.	Whiteinch	United Kingdom	For private owner.
Unknown date	Indian Chief	Merchantman	William Kinloch	Kingstonb	United Kingdom	For private owner.
Unknown date	Inez Clarke	Sternwheeler	Messrs. Yarrow & Co.	Poplar	United Kingdom	For private owner.
Unknown date	Indore	Paddle steamer	Messrs. William Denny & Bros.	Dumbarton	United Kingdom	For private owner.
Unknown date	Iris	Steamship		Stockton-on-Tees	United Kingdom	For Edward Letham.
Unknown date	Jackal	Steam yacht	Messrs. Cunliffe & Dunlop	Port Glasgow	United Kingdom	For private owner.
Unknown date	Jane	Merchantman	William Pickersgill	Sunderland	United Kingdom	For J. & J. Denholm.
Unknown date	Jenny	Merchantman	Austin & Hunter	Sunderland	United Kingdom	For T. Rodenacker.
Unknown date	Jessie	Merchantman	Alexander Spence	Garmouth	United Kingdom	For private owner.
Unknown date	Joe Webre	Steamship			United States	For New Orleans and Timbalier Transportation Company.
Unknown date	Kaffir Chief	Merchantman	William Kinloch	Kingston	United Kingdom	For private owner.
Unknown date	Kepler	Merchantman	Bartram, Haswell & Co	Sunderland	United Kingdom	For Wilkie & Turnbull.
Unknown date	Knight of the Thistle	Merchantman	Messrs. Thomas Royden & Sons	Liverpool	United Kingdom	For Messrs. Greenshields, Cowie & Co.
Unknown date	Lady of the Lake	Schooner	Messrs. Watson	Banff	United Kingdom	For John Bremner & Co.
Unknown date	Lamperts	Steamship	Messrs. William Gray & Co.	West Hartlepool	United Kingdom	For private owner.
Unknown date	Lampo	Merchantman	Messrs. W. H. Potter & Sons	Liverpool	United Kingdom	For Woodhouse & Co.
Unknown date	Larch	Steamship	Blumer & Co.	Sunderland	United Kingdom	For Peacock Bros.
Unknown date	Larnaca	Merchantman	Messrs. Thomas Royden & Sons	Liverpool	United Kingdom	For Messrs Thomas Royden & Sons.
Unknown date	Larnax	Merchantman	Joseph L. Thompson	Sunderland	United Kingdom	For A. Smith & Co.
Unknown date	Le Creuset	Merchantman	Blumer & Co.	Sunderland	United Kingdom	For Delmas Frères.
Unknown date	Leura	Steamship	Messrs. W. H. Potter & Sons	Liverpool	United Kingdom	For W. H. Smith.
Unknown date	Leversons	Merchantman	Joseph L. Thompson	Sunderland	United Kingdom	For Gordon & Stamp.
Unknown date	Lida	Vale-class gunboat		Stockholm	Sweden	For Royal Norwegian Navy.
Unknown date	Lily	Merchantman	Messrs. Smith & Ritchie	Portsoy	United Kingdom	For private owner.
Unknown date	Linhope	Steamship	Messrs. William Gray & Co.	West Hartlepool	United Kingdom	For private owner.
Unknown date	Lotus	Steam yacht	Messrs. W. H. Potter & Son	Liverpool	United Kingdom	For H. Evans.
Unknown date	Lucretia	Merchantman	Bartram, Haswell & Co.	Sunderland	United Kingdom	For Wilkie & Turnbull.
Unknown date	Lyttleton	Paddle tug	Messrs. Laird Bros	Birkenhead	United Kingdom	For private owner.
Unknown date	Maggie and Janet	Steamship	Messrs. John Fullarton & Co.	Paisley	United Kingdom	For private owner.
Unknown date	Maia	Yacht	Messrs. W. H. Potter & Sons	Liverpool	United Kingdom	For T. A. R. Littledale.
Unknown date	Manora	Steamship	Messrs. William Denny & Bros.	Dumbarton	United Kingdom	For private owner.
Unknown date	Marie Fanny	Merchantman	Austin & Hunter	Sunderland	United Kingdom	For MM. D'Orbigny & Faustin Fils.
Unknown date	Mareotis	Steamship			United Kingdom	For Messrs. James Moss & Co.
Unknown date	Masterpiece	Fishing trawler	S. C. Allerton.	Lowestoft	United Kingdom	For Richard N. Saunders.
Unknown date	Mastiff	Steamship	Messrs. J. & G. Thompson	Dalmuir	United Kingdom	For private owner.
Unknown date	Maude	Barque	Messrs. R. & J. Evans & Co.	Liverpool	United Kingdom	For private owner.
Unknown date	Menmuir	Merchantman	William Doxford & Sons	Sunderland	United Kingdom	For J. Guthrie & W. McTaggart.
Unknown date	Moel Rhiwan	Merchantman	William Doxford & Sons	Sunderland	United Kingdom	For W. E. Jones.
Unknown date	Mona	Merchantman	Osbourne, Graham & Co.	Sunderland	United Kingdom	For J. Owen.
Unknown date	Monica	Merchantman	Austin & Hunter	Sunderland	United Kingdom	For Gordon & Stamp.
Unknown date	Morning Star	Merchantman	John Duncan	Kingston	United Kingdom	For private owner.
Unknown date	Mysore	Paddle steamer	Messrs. William Denny & Bros.	Dumbarton	United Kingdom	For private owner.
Unknown date	Netley Abbey	Steamship	Messrs. William Gray & Co.	West Hartlepool	United Kingdom	For private owner.
Unknown date	Nar Whal	Tug	Messrs. Robert Duncan & Co.	Port Glasgow	United Kingdom	For private owner.
Unknown date	Nettlesworth	Merchantman	Joseph L. Thompson	Sunderland	United Kingdom	For Gordon & Stamp.
Unknown date	Oberon	Barque	Austin & Hunter	Sunderland	United Kingdom	For G. Bolte & Co.
Unknown date	Old Settler	Sternwheeler		Olympia	(United States) Washington Territory	For private owner.
Unknown date	Olive Branch	Merchantman	John Duncan	Kingston	United Kingdom	For private owner.
Unknown date	Onward	Sailing barge	William Bayley & Sons	Ipswich	United Kingdom	For private owner.
Unknown date	Orcadian	Fishing vessel	R. Aldous & Co.	Brightlingsea	United Kingdom	For C. Thomas & A. J. Baxter.
Unknown date	Owl	Barge	Bewley, Webb & Co.	Dublin	United Kingdom	For Grand Canal Company.
Unknown date	Pendle Hill	Schooner	Blumer & Co.	Sunderland	United Kingdom	For W. Price.
Unknown date	Polly	Merchantman	William Pickersgill	Sunderland	United Kingdom	For J. & J. Denholm.
Unknown date	Precursor	Tender	Messrs. Raylton, Dixon & Co.	Middlesbrough	United Kingdom	For Great Grimsby Ice Co.
Unknown date	Prinz Heinrich	Merchantman	Short Bros.	Sunderland	United Kingdom	For Anglia Steam Navigation Co.
Unknown date	Prinz Wilhelm	Merchantman	Short Bros.	Sunderland	United Kingdom	For Anglia Steam Navigation Co.
Unknown date	Ramos	Steamship	Messrs. Cunliffe & Dunlop	Port Glasgow	United Kingdom	For private owner.
Unknown date	Ravenswood	Merchantman	Messrs. W. H. Potter & Son	Liverpool	United Kingdom	For John Sprott.
Unknown date	Remonstrant	Barque	Robert Thompson Jr.	Sunderland	United Kingdom	For R. Conaway & Co.
Unknown date	Rescue	Merchantman	John Crown	Southwick	United Kingdom	For John Crown.
Unknown date	Resurgam	Submarine	George Garrett	Birkenhead	United Kingdom	For George Garrett.
Unknown date	R. G. Stewart	Steamship		Buffalo, New York	United States	For Cornelius Flynn.
Unknown date	Rhiwindda	Merchantman	James Laing	Sunderland	United Kingdom	For W. Y. Edwards.
Unknown date	Ridge Park	Steamship	Austin & Hunter.	Sunderland	United Kingdom	For Sir Thomas Elder.
Unknown date	Riversdale	Merchantman	James Laing	Sunderland	United Kingdom	For Dixon & Wilson.
Unknown date	Rook	Steamship	Messrs. J. & G. Thompson	Dalmuir	United Kingdom	For private owner.
Unknown date	Rosedale	Steamship	W. B. Thompson	Dundee	United Kingdom	For Clarence and Richmond River Steam Navigation Co.
Unknown date	Rossini	Merchantman	Bartram, Haswell & Co.	Sunderland	United Kingdom	For Jenneson, Taylor & Co.
Unknown date	Rugby	Steamship	Messrs. William Gray & Co.	West Hartlepool	United Kingdom	For private owner.
Unknown date	Ryvali	Barque	Messrs. Birrell, Stenhouse & Co.	Dumbarton	United Kingdom	For private owner.
Unknown date	Sapphire	Steamship	Robert Thompson Jr.	Sunderland	United Kingdom	For P. M. Duncan.
Unknown date	Satonia	Steamship	Messrs. Caird & Co.	Greenock	United Kingdom	For private owner.
Unknown date	Saramang	Steamship	W. Simons & Co.	Renfrew	United Kingdom	For private owner.
Unknown date	Scottish Admiral	Barque	William Doxford & Sons	Sunderland	United Kingdom	For McIlwraith, MacEacharn & Co.
Unknown date	Sea Mew	Steam launch			United Kingdom	For private owner.
Unknown date	Sequel	Merchantman	A. Simey	Sunderland	United Kingdom	For G. Leach.
Unknown date	Sherard Osborn	Steamship	Messrs. Scott & Co.	Greenock	United Kingdom	For private owner.
Unknown date	Simla	Steamship	Messrs. Caird & Co.	Greenock	United Kingdom	For private owner.
Unknown date	Sir Walter	Steamship	Messrs. J. & G. Thompson	Dalmuir	United Kingdom	For private owner.
Unknown date	Speedwell	Merchantman	Alexander Spence	Garmouth	United Kingdom	For private owner.
Unknown date	St. Fagans	Steamship			United Kingdom	For private owner.
Unknown date	Stour	Paddle steamer	Thames Ironworks and Shipbuilding Company	Leamouth	United Kingdom	For Great Eastern Railway.
Unknown date	Swiftsure	Merchantman	James Geddie	Kingston	United Kingdom	For private owner.
Unknown date	Teutonia	Steamship	Messrs. Caird & Co.	Greenock	United Kingdom	For private owner.
Unknown date	Thasos	Steamship	Reiherstieg Schiffswerfte & Maschinenfabrik	Hamburg	Germany	For Deutsche Levant Linie.
Unknown date	Triton	Merchantman	Austin & Hunter	Sunderland	United Kingdom	For G. Bolte & Co.
Unknown date	Trocadero	Steamship		Paisley	United Kingdom	For Dansey & Robinson.
Unknown date	Universal	Merchantman	Short Bros.	Sunderland	United Kingdom	For Taylor & Sanderson.
Unknown date	Uraval	Steamship	Messrs. Robert Steele & Co.	Greenock	United Kingdom	For private owner.
Unknown date	Vagliano Brothers	Merchantman	Bartram, Haswell & Co.	Sunderland	United Kingdom	For Vagliano Bros.
Unknown date	Venture	Merchantman	James Geddie Jr.	Garmouth	United Kingdom	For private owner.
Unknown date	Victoria	Ferry	W. Allsup & Sons	Preston	United Kingdom	For private owner.
Unknown date	Vidar	Vale-class gunboat	Karljohansvern	Horten	Norway	For Royal Norwegian Navy.
Unknown date	Viking	Merchantman	James Geddie Jr.	Garmouth	United Kingdom	For private owner.
Unknown date	Viking	Steam launch	Mr. Hudson	Shrewsburyt	United Kingdom	For private owner.
Unknown date	Viscount Castlereagh	Merchantman	Short Bros.	Sunderland	United Kingdom	For Marquess of Londonderry.
Unknown date	Walrus	Steamship	Messrs. J. & G. Thompson	Dalmuir	United Kingdom	For private owner.
Unknown date	Welton	Steamship	Messrs. William Gray & Co.	West Hartlepool	United Kingdom	For private owner.
Unknown date	Wembdon	Merchantman	Blumer & Co	Sunderland	United Kingdom	For J. Ware.
Unknown date	Whitworth	Steamboat	W. Allsup & Sons	Preston	United Kingdom	For Thomas Whitworth.
Unknown date	Wildfire	Steam yacht	W. Allsup & Sons	Preston	United Kingdom	For W. R. Graves.
Unknown date	William Hood	Fishing trawler	Bell & Trolley	Grimsby	United Kingdom	For Charles Forester.
Unknown date	Wynyard Park	Merchantman	Short Bros.	Sunderland	United Kingdom	For Marquess of Londonderry.
Unknown date	Yembo	Merchantman	James Lainjg	Sunderland	United Kingdom	For D. G. Pinkney & Son.
Unknown date	Zenobia	Fishing trawler	Edwin Barter	Brixham	United Kingdom	For .
Unknown date	No. 12	Steam barge	Messrs. Henry Murray & Co.	Port Glasgow	United Kingdom	For private owner.
Unknown date	No. 13	Steam barge	Messrs. Henry Murray & Co.	Port Glasgow	United Kingdom	For private owner.
