= Brage =

Brage may refer to:

- Another name for Norse god Bragi
- Brage (given name), a Norwegian masculine given name
- Brage Prize, an annual Norwegian literary award.
- IK Brage, a Swedish football club located in Borlänge
- Brage oil field, operated by Wintershall Norge, located off the coast of Norway
- HNoMS Brage, two ships in the Royal Norwegian Navy:
  - HNoMS Brage (1878), Vale-class gunboat
  - HNoMS Brage (N49), Auk-class minesweeper
