= HNoMS Brage =

Two ships of the Royal Norwegian Navy have borne the name HNoMS Brage, after the Norse skaldic god Bragi:

- HNoMS Brage (1878) was a Vale-class Rendel gunboat. She was launched in 1878, captured by the Germans in 1940, returned to Norway in 1945 and scrapped shortly thereafter.
- HNoMS Brage (N49) was the ex-American Auk-class minesweeper USS Triumph (AM-323). She was launched on 25 February 1943, transferred to the Royal Norwegian Navy on 27 January 1961, and scrapped in 1978.
