= HNoMS Uller =

Two ships of the Royal Norwegian Navy have borne the name HNoMS Uller, after the Norse god Ullr:

- HNoMS Uller (1876) was a Vale-class Rendel gunboat. She was launched in 1876, captured by the Germans in 1940, and sunk by Norwegian bombers shortly thereafter.
- HNoMS Uller (N50) was the ex-American Auk-class minesweeper USS Seer (AM-112). She was launched on 23 May 1942 and sold to the Royal Norwegian Navy on 15 December 1962.
