= HNoMS Nor =

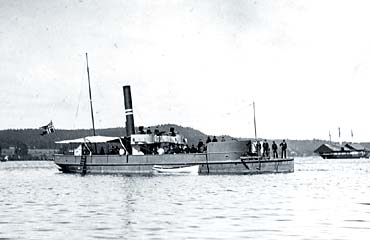
- Vale-class gunboat

History

Norway
- Name: Nor
- Namesake: Nór – mythological co-founder of Norway
- Builder: Karljohansverns Verft Naval Yard in Horten
- Launched: 23 October 1878
- Commissioned: 1878
- Decommissioned: 1945
- Out of service: 14 April 1940
- Fate: Decommissioned and sold to civilian interests in 1945

General characteristics
- Class & type: Vale-class Rendel gunboat
- Displacement: 260 tons
- Length: 28 m (91.86 ft)
- Propulsion: 220 hp steam engine
- Speed: 8.5 knots (15.74 km/h)
- Complement: 41 (31 after rebuild)
- Armament: As built: 1 × 21 cm (10.5 inch) RML gun; 1 × 1pdr (cm / inch) QF gun; 1 × 1pdr (cm / inch) revolving gun; After rebuild: 1 × 12 cm (4.72 inch) gun; 1 × 47 mm (1.85 inch); 2 × 37 mm (1.46 inch) guns; 50 mines

HNoMS Nor was a Vale-class Rendel gunboat built for the Royal Norwegian Navy at Horten Naval Yard in 1878. She was one of a class of five gunboats - the other ships in the class were Vale, Brage, Uller and Vidar.

Nor was, in addition to the heavy, muzzle-loading main gun, armed with a small 'Quick Fire' gun and a 37mm Hotchkiss Revolving Cannon (broadly similar to the Gatling gun).

Later Nor and her sister ships was rebuilt as mine layers, and she served in this role when the Germans invaded in 1940. During the Norwegian Campaign she served mainly in Sognefjorden. She was captured by German forces on 14 April 1940, and returned to Norway after the war.

The vessel was built at the Naval Yard at Horten, and had yard number 57. After being decommissioned in 1945 the ship was sold to a civilian company in 1949, converted to a salvage ship/tug and renamed Flatholm.
