= HNoMS Vidar (1878) =

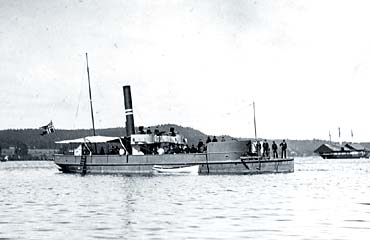
- Vale-class gunboat

History

Norway
- Name: Vidar
- Namesake: Víðarr – Norse vengeance god and son of Odin and the giantess Gríðr
- Builder: Karljohansverns Verft Naval Yard in Horten
- Launched: 1878
- Commissioned: 1878
- Decommissioned: 1947

General characteristics
- Class & type: Vale-class Rendel gunboat
- Displacement: 260 tons
- Length: 28 m (91 ft 10 in)
- Propulsion: 220 hp steam engine
- Speed: 8.5 knots (15.74 km/h)
- Complement: 41 (31 after rebuild)
- Armament: As built: 1 × 21 cm (10.5 inch) RML gun; 1 × 1pdr (cm / inch) QF gun; 1 × 1pdr (cm / inch) revolving gun; After rebuild: 1 × 12 cm (4.72 inch) gun; 1 × 47 mm (1.85 inch); 2 × 37 mm (1.46 inch) guns; 50 mines

HNoMS Vidar was a Vale-class Rendel gunboat built for the Royal Norwegian Navy at Horten Naval Yard in 1878. She was one of a class of five gunboats - the other ships in the class were Vale, Brage, Nor and Uller.

Vidar was, in addition to the heavy, muzzle-loading main gun, armed with a small 'Quick Fire' gun and a 37mm Hotchkiss Revolving Cannon (broadly similar to the Gatling gun).

Later Vidar, like her sister ships, was rebuilt as a minelayer, and she served in this role when the Germans invaded in 1940. During the Norwegian Campaign she served mainly in Sognefjorden. She was captured by German forces on 14 April 1940, and returned to Norway after the war.

Vidar was built at the Naval Yard at Horten, and had yard number 60.
