= HNoMS Uller (1876) =

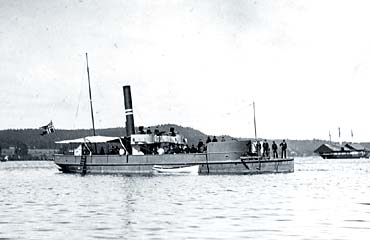
- Vale-class gunboat

History

Norway
- Name: Uller
- Namesake: Norse god Ullr
- Builder: Karljohansverns Verft Naval Yard in Horten
- Yard number: 55
- Laid down: 1874
- Launched: 21 July 1876
- Commissioned: 1876
- Captured: by the Germans on 9 April 1940

Service record
- Operations: Opposing the German invasion of Norway

Nazi Germany
- Name: Uller
- Acquired: 9 April 1940
- Fate: Bombed and damaged by Royal Norwegian Navy Air Service Heinkel He 115, then scuttled by Tyr

Service record
- Operations: Norwegian Campaign

General characteristics as built
- Class & type: Vale-class Rendel gunboat
- Displacement: 250 tons
- Length: 27.3 m (89.57 ft)
- Beam: 7.9 m (25.92 ft)
- Draft: 2.2 m (7.22 ft)
- Propulsion: Two Compound steam engines with 200 hps
- Speed: 8 knots (14.82 km/h)
- Complement: 41 men
- Armament: 1 × 21 cm (10.5 inch) Armstrong RML gun; 1 × 1pdr (cm / inch) QF gun; 1 × 1pdr (cm / inch) revolving gun

General characteristics after rebuild
- Displacement: 250 tons
- Length: 27.3 m (89.57 ft)
- Beam: 7.9 m (25.92 ft)
- Draft: 2.2 m (7.22 ft)
- Propulsion: Two Compound steam engines with 200 hps
- Speed: 8 knots (14.82 km/h)
- Complement: 31 men
- Armament: 1 × 12 cm (4.72 inch) gun; 3 × 37 mm (1.46 inch) guns; 50 mines

HNoMS Uller was a Vale-class Rendel gunboat constructed for the Royal Norwegian Navy at Karljohansverns Verft Naval Yard in Horten in 1874-1876 and had yard build number 55. She was one of a class of five gunboats - the other ships in the class were Vale, Brage, Nor and Vidar.

Uller was, in addition to the heavy, muzzle-loading main gun, armed with a small Quick Fire gun and a 37mm Hotchkiss Revolving Cannon (broadly similar to the Gatling gun).

Later Uller and her sister ships were rebuilt as minelayers, and she served in this role when the Germans invaded 9 April 1940.

== The invasion ==
=== Capture ===
When the Germans attacked, Uller was mining the sea lanes to Bergen, and was taken by surprise by the German forces.

=== Sinking ===
After being pressed into Kriegsmarine service Uller and fellow captured minelayer HNoMS Tyr were mining the entrance to the still Norwegian-held Sognefjorden on 1 May 1940 when they were first bombed unsuccessfully by two Royal Norwegian Navy Air Service Marinens Flyvebaatfabrikk M.F.11 maritime reconnaissance aircraft of the Sognefjord Air Group and then attacked again later the same day by a Heinkel He 115 of the same unit. In the second attack Uller was hit by a bomb, beached and then scuttled by Tyr.

== Bibliography ==
- Abelsen, Frank (1986). Norwegian naval ships 1939-1945 (in Norwegian and English). Oslo: Sem & Stenersen AS. ISBN 82-7046-050-8.
- Hauge, Andreas (1995). Kampene i Norge 1940 (in Norwegian). Vol. 1. Sandefjord: Krigshistorisk Forlag. ISBN 82-993369-0-2.
