= Regulus (ship) =

Several ships have been named Regulus for the star Regulus:

- Regulus (1797 ship) was built in Spain. The British captured her in 1797. She spent her career trading to the Cape of Good Hope and West Africa. She was briefly a privateer. She was broken up in 1806.
- Regulus was a French privateer that HMS Princess Charlotte captured in December 1804; she became HMS Morne Fortunee, there being an HMS Regulus already in service.
- Regulus (1812 ship), of 378 tons (bm), was launched at Whitby. In 1825 she carried assisted immigrants from Cork to Quebec under a scheme promoted by Peter Robinson. She was last listed in 1855.
- SS Regulus (1878) was a steamship registered in St. John's, Dominion of Newfoundland. She was lost, with all hands, on 23 October 1910 in Leeward Cove, 1.5 miles (2.4 km) south of Motion Head, Petty Harbour-Maddox Cove, Newfoundland during a southeast gale.
- SS Regulus (1907), of 548 GRT, was launched by Swan, Hunter & Wigham Richardson at Newcastle upon Tyne. In September 1917 she rescued the crew of SS Port Kembla after Port Kembla struck a mine. Regulus was broken up in 1936.
- SS Regulus (T-AKR-292)

== See also ==
- HMS Regulus
- French ship Régulus (1805)
- USS Regulus
