= Stainforth =

Stainforth may refer to two places in Yorkshire, England:

- Stainforth, North Yorkshire, England, a village near Settle
- Stainforth, South Yorkshire, England, a town near Doncaster

== See also ==
- Stainforth (surname)
- Stainforth and Keadby Canal, in South Yorkshire and Lincolnshire
