= Brage (given name) =

- Gender: Male

Origin
- Origin: Old Norse
- Meaning: poetry
- Region of origin: Norway

Other names
- Related names: Bragi

Brage is a Norwegian masculine given name originating from the Old Norse name Bragi, developing from the word "bragr" meaning poetry. As of January 2019, there were 2 813 men who had Brage as first name in Norway.

== Notable people ==
Notable Norwegians with the given name include;

- Brage Aronsen, a Norwegian activist and editor
- Brage Bråten Richenberg, a Norwegian snowboarder
- Brage Sandmoen, a Norwegian football referee
- Brage Larsen Sollund, a Norwegian politician
