= Stainforth (surname) =

Stainforth is a surname, and may refer to:

- Charles Stainforth (1914–2000), British army officer
- Francis Stainforth (1797–1866), British cleric and collector
- George Stainforth (1899–1942), British Royal Air Force pilot
- Martin Stainforth (1866–1957), British artist
- Robert Masterman Stainforth (1915–2002), British micropaleontologist and stratigrapher
