= HNoMS Brage (1878) =

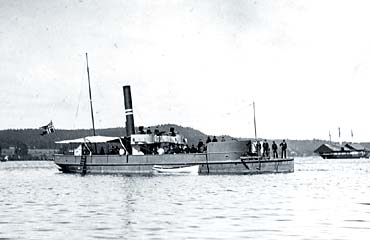
- Vale-class gunboat

History

Norway
- Name: Brage
- Namesake: Norse skaldic god Bragi
- Builder: The Royal Norwegian Navy's shipyard at Horten
- Launched: 1 November 1878
- Commissioned: 1878
- Captured: by the Germans on 9 April 1940

Germany
- Acquired: 9 April 1940
- Fate: Handed back to Norway after VE Day

Service record
- Operations: Occupation of Norway by Nazi Germany

Norway
- Name: Brage
- Acquired: May 1945
- Decommissioned: 1945
- Fate: Scrapped in 1945

General characteristics as built
- Class & type: Vale-class Rendel gunboat
- Displacement: 260 tons standard
- Length: 28 m (91.86 ft)
- Propulsion: 220 hp steam engine
- Speed: 8.5 knots (15.74 km/h)
- Complement: 41 men
- Armament: 1 × 21 cm (10.5 inch) RML gun; 1 × 1pdr (cm / inch) QF gun; 1 × 1pdr (cm / inch) revolving gun

General characteristics after rebuild
- Displacement: 260 tons standard
- Length: 28 m (91.86 ft)
- Propulsion: 220 hp steam engine
- Speed: 8.5 knots (15.74 km/h)
- Complement: 31 men
- Armament: 1 × 12 cm (4.72 inch) gun; 3 × 37 mm (1.46 inch) guns; 50 mines

HNoMS Brage was a Vale-class Rendel gunboat built for the Royal Norwegian Navy at Horten Naval Yard in 1874, with build number 58. She was one of a class of five gunboats - the other ships in the class were Vale, Nor, Uller and Vidar.

Brage was, in addition to the heavy, muzzle-loading main gun, armed with a small 'Quick Fire' gun and a 37mm Hotchkiss Revolving Cannon (broadly similar to the Gatling gun).

Later Brage, like her sister ships, was rebuilt as a minelayer, and she served in this role when the Germans invaded in 1940. She was captured by German forces after the surrender of Norwegian forces in Southern Norway, and returned to Norway after the war.
