= SS Regulus (1878) =

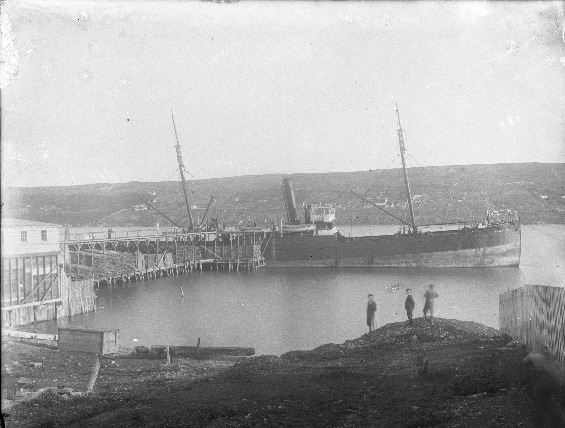
- SS Regulus at Harbour Grace, Newfoundland

History
- Name: Regulus
- Owner: A. Harvey and Company
- Port of registry: St. John's, Dominion of Newfoundland
- Ordered: 1877
- Builder: Tyne Iron Shipbuilding Company
- Yard number: 13
- Laid down: 1877
- Launched: 1878 for Stephens & Mawson, Newcastle
- Acquired: 1897 by A. Harvey and Company
- In service: 1878
- Out of service: 1910
- Identification: 80531
- Fate: Wrecked

General characteristics
- Type: Bulk carrier
- Tonnage: 1,419 GRT
- Length: 258 ft (79 m)
- Beam: 32 ft (9.8 m)
- Draft: 19 ft (5.8 m)
- Installed power: 140 hp (100 kW)
- Propulsion: 2 cyl (29 & 55 x 36 in) compound expansion marine steam engine
- Crew: 19

SS Regulus was a steamship registered in St. John's, Dominion of Newfoundland. She was lost, with all hands, on October 23, 1910, on the rocks known as Hayes' Reef in Leeward Cove (now known as Lower Cove), 1.5 miles (2.4 km) south of Motion Head, Petty Harbour-Maddox Cove, Newfoundland during a southeast gale. The gale was most probably the last remnants of the 1910 Cuba hurricane.

== History ==
Tyne Iron Shipbuilding Company built SS Regulus Willington Quay and launched her on 26 October 1878. She entered service with Stevens and Mawson, Newcastle. A. Harvey and Company of Newfoundland purchased her in 1897 and she served as a general cargo vessel servicing routes between Newfoundland and various ports along the northeast coast of North America.

SS Regulus had a reputation as being a "jinxed ship." In 1907 Regulus collided head-on with an iceberg off Bay Bulls resulting in severe damage. On July 15, 1910, just three months prior to her loss, Regulus collided with SS Karema 25 miles (40 km) southeast of Nantucket. She was en route from Bell Island to Philadelphia with a full load of iron ore when she crashed head on into the port side of Karema. The collision resulted in severe damage to both vessels and had it not been for emergency repairs Karema would surely have been lost.

== Loss ==
On October 22, 1910 Regulus departed Bell Island, Newfoundland en route to Sydney, Nova Scotia, in ballast. At 2 pm that day A. Harvey and Company received a telegraph from Bay Bulls stating that Regulus' tail shaft had broken and she was at anchor off Shoal Bay and requesting immediate assistance. Two tugs, John Green and D.P. Ingraham, were immediately dispatched from St. John's to render assistance. HMS Brilliant was also in port and offered to assist but it was decided that the two tugs would be sufficient for the task.

After passing Cape Spear John Green encountered fog which grew denser as they made headway. When the tugs had reached the last reported location of Regulus a dense fog had blanketed the entire area with a strong southerly breeze blowing and seas beginning to get heavier. The tugs cruised around for hours searching for Regulus and it was not until 10 pm that evening that John Green sighted Regulus' lights and came alongside. At this time three options were discussed: 1) The tug would take Regulus' crew off the vessel and land them in Bay Bulls. 2) The crew would remain with Regulus and John Green would remain close by Regulus until daylight. 3) The tug would take Regulus under tow to St. John's. For unknown reasons option 3 was chosen and the crew set about to take Regulus under tow at near 10:30 pm. It took between one and a half to two hours to weigh Regulus' anchor, why the anchor was not slipped remains a mystery. At approximately 1 am the tow commenced, by this time the wind had veered southeast and increased to gale force with heavy seas making. The tow proceeded at about 2 miles per hour (3.2 km/h), a pace such that both vessels made considerable leeway toward land which was spotted by the tugs crew off the port bow at about 2:30 am. The tug's crew immediately ported to avoid rocks resulting in the Hawser breaking. The crew of John Green then witnessed the lights of Regulus drifting leeward for approximately five minutes before disappearing.

At day break a search was started for survivors, however the seas were still heavy and by days end it was concluded that there were likely no survivors. The propeller of the vessel was spotted lodged in a cliff at Leeward Cove which confirmed Regulus foundered on Hayes Reef in Leeward Cove.

The fishermen and residents of nearby Petty Harbour-Maddox Cove immediately launched a recovery effort in an attempt to recover the bodies of the crew. At great peril they spent the next several days in the area in their open skiffs using traditional fishing jiggers to drag the bottom for bodies but were hampered by the heavy seas. At one point there were reportedly 20 skiffs on the scene. They also reported that Regulus' boat davits were intact and the boats had been launched but debris found on the scene proved the boats had been smashed to pieces on the rocks.

The wreck of Regulus remained grounded and visible for the first couple of days but the heavy seas were taking their toll and the vessel was breaking up. Regulus eventually slipped below the surface. A diving team from HMS Brilliant located the wreck at a depth of 15 fathoms (90 ft; 27 m) in Leeward Cove across a subsurface gulch on a west to east heading with her bow to the east. Despite the efforts of the residents of Petty Harbour and the dive teams from HMS Brilliant no bodies were ever recovered from the wreck. The divers reported a severe and dangerous undertow which may have resulted in any bodies being dragged hundreds of meters out to sea.

== Court of Marine Inquiry ==
On November 16, 1910, a Court of Marine Inquiry was held at St. John's, Newfoundland with J.G. Conroy presiding. The final judgement of the inquiry laid blame for the disaster on the crew of the tug John Green. The course steered by the tug was not a safe and proper course to clear Motion Head. To safely clear Motion Head, in such conditions, an east course should have been followed instead of the northeast by east course taken.
