= Vale-class gunboat =

Rendel gunboats built for the Royal Norwegian Navy (1874–1878)

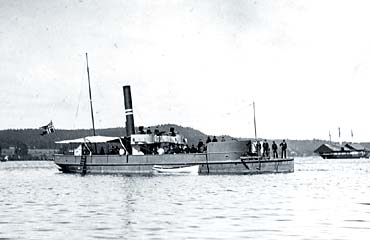
- Vale-class gunboat Note shield protecting RLM gun, and small overall size.

Class overview
- Builders: Karljohansverns Verft Naval Yard, Horten
- Operators: Royal Norwegian Navy
- Succeeded by: Gor-class gunboat
- Built: 1874–1878
- In commission: 1884–1947
- Completed: 5
- Lost: 1
- Scrapped: 4

General characteristics
- Type: Gunboat, later rebuilt as minelayer
- Displacement: 260 long tons (264 t)
- Length: 28 m (91 ft 10 in)
- Propulsion: Coal-fired reciprocating steam engines, 220 shp (164 kW)
- Speed: 8.5 knots (9.8 mph; 15.7 km/h)
- Complement: 44 (31 after rebuild)
- Armament: As built : 1 × 26.67 cm (10.50 in) RML gun; 1 × 1-pdr 37 mm (1.5 in) automatic gun; 2 × 1-pdr 37 mm (1.5 in) revolver light automatic gun; After rebuild : 1 × 12 cm (4.7 in) gun; 3 × 37 mm (1.5 in) guns; or; 1 × 47 mm (1.9 in) & 2 × 37 mm (1.5 in) guns; Mines

The Vale class was a class of five Rendel (or "flat-iron") gunboats built for the Royal Norwegian Navy between 1874 and 1878. Small, nimble vessels, they were armed with a single large calibre muzzle-loading gun for offensive purposes and several small, quick firing guns for self-defence.

== Service history ==
Shortly before the First World War, the five vessels were rebuilt as minelayers. During this rebuild, the heavy muzzle-loading gun was replaced with a more modern 12 cm breech-loader, and on Nor and Vidar one of the 37 mm guns was replaced with a more potent 47 mm gun. Since the heavy gun and ammunition was removed, these diminutive vessels could carry a useful number of mines.

All vessels were kept in service until the German invasion in 1940 and with the exception of Uller, which was sunk by the Royal Norwegian Navy Air Service after capture by the Germans, they all spent the remainder of the war in German hands.

After the Second World War the vessels were returned to the Royal Norwegian Navy, and scrapped over the course of the next few years.

== Ships ==
- HNoMS Vale
- HNoMS Brage
- HNoMS Nor
- HNoMS Uller
- HNoMS Vidar
