= HNoMS Vale (1874) =

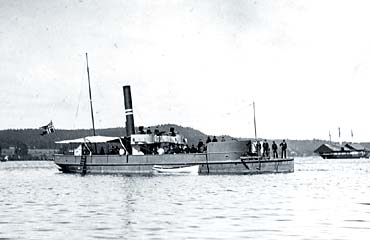
- Vale-class gunboat

History

Norway
- Name: Vale
- Namesake: Váli – son of the god Odin and the giantess Rindr
- Builder: Karljohansverns Verft Naval Yard in Horten
- Yard number: 54
- Launched: 14 April 1874
- Commissioned: 1874
- Captured: by the Germans in 1940

Service record
- Operations: Norwegian Campaign

Germany
- Acquired: 1940
- Fate: Handed back to Norway after VE Day

Service record
- Operations: Occupation of Norway by Nazi Germany

Norway
- Name: Vale
- Acquired: 1945
- Decommissioned: 1946

General characteristics as built
- Class & type: Vale-class Rendel gunboat
- Displacement: 260 tons
- Length: 28 m (91.86 ft)
- Propulsion: 220 hp steam engine
- Speed: 8.5 knots (15.74 km/h)
- Complement: 41
- Armament: 1 × 21 cm (10.5 inch) RML gun; 1 × 1pdr (cm / inch) QF gun; 1 × 1pdr (cm / inch) revolving gun

General characteristics after rebuild
- Displacement: 260 tons
- Length: 28 m (91.86 ft)
- Propulsion: 220 hp steam engine
- Speed: 8.5 knots (15.74 km/h)
- Complement: 31
- Armament: 1 × 12 cm (4.72 inch) gun; 3 × 37 mm (1.46 inch) guns; 50 mines

Gunboat Vale was a Vale-class Rendel gunboat built for the Royal Norwegian Navy at Karljohansvern Naval Yard in 1874. She was one of a class of five gunboats - the other ships in the class was Brage, Nor, Uller and Vidar.

Vale was, in addition to the heavy, muzzle-loading main gun, armed with a small 'Quick Fire' gun and a 37mm Hotchkiss Revolving Cannon (broadly similar to the Gatling gun).

Later Vale and her sister ships were rebuilt as mine layers, and she served in this role when the Germans invaded Norway in 1940. During the Norwegian Campaign, she served mainly in the Sognefjord. She was captured by German forces after the surrender of Norwegian forces in southern Norway, and was returned to Norway after the war.

The vessel was built at the Naval Yard at Horten, and had yard number 54.
