= Fernando de Noronha (disambiguation) =

Fernando de Noronha is an island group off the coast of Brazil.

Fernando de Noronha may also refer to:

- Fernão de Loronha (fl. 1502), Lisbon merchant who gave his name to island group
- Fernando de Noronha, 2nd Count of Vila Real (d.1445), governor of Ceuta
- Fernando de Noronha Marine National Park, a protected area on the island
- Fernando de Noronha Environmental Protection Area, a controlled tourist area on the island
