= Hansford Ward =

John Ralph Hansford Ward (November 1817 – 17 February 1903), invariably known as Hansford Ward or Captain Ward, was a ship's captain in South Australia, who figures prominently in the pre-history of the Adelaide Steamship Company. A son, also named John Ralph Hansford Ward (8 April 1852 – ) but known as John R. H. Ward, was also a ship's captain.

== History ==
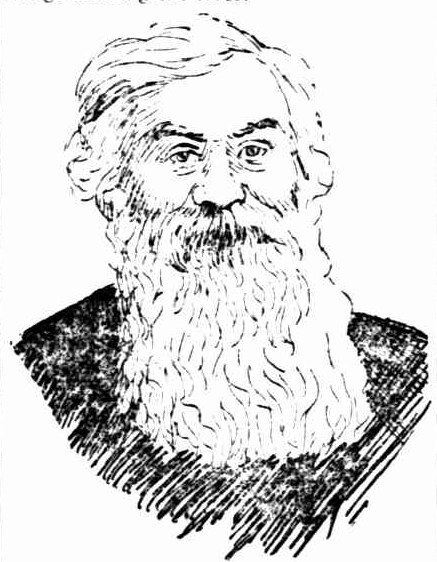
Hansford Ward

Ward was born at Abbotsbury, Dorset, and emigrated to South Australia aboard Lady Lilford, arriving in September 1839. He settled at Glenelg, and gained employment under Thomas Lipson as a crew member for John Anthony's boat, associated with the Glenelg custom house. He was one of Lipson's party at the proclamation of Port Adelaide in 1840.

In April 1840, Ward was among the party that accompanied Governor Gawler to explore and chart the Spencer Gulf coast of Eyre Peninsula from Port Lincoln to Franklin Harbor. Also in that party were Thomas Lipson, John Hill, Thomas Burr, and Alfred Hardy.

He married Jane Best in August 1840. She was the eldest daughter of J. Richard Best of Hindmarsh, who died on 1 January 1850 from head injuries sustained at the Adelaide racetrack after a viewing platform railing gave way.

In 1841 the customs facility at Glenelg was disbanded, and Ward turned to fishing. He founded H. Ward & Co., proprietors of oyster and cray fishing boats, in which business he was involved for about ten years. He also ran the Glenelg Hotel from 1846 to 1850.

=== Cutter O.G. ===
A cutter 20 tons burthen was built by the firm of Henning & Fenden on the banks of the Patawalonga River and in 1840 christened O.G. (perhaps originally Osmond Gilles) before the cream of Adelaide society. The ceremony was held to coincide with the launch of the township of Glenelg, whose proprietors included William Finke, Osmond Gilles (for whom the boat was named), H. R. Wigley (father of W. R. Wigley) and Mathew Smith.

The ceremony became a fiasco after a downpour turned the ground to a particularly slippery species of mud, and the boat refused to be launched when the tide did not rise to the height expected, and had to be postponed.

O.G. was the first boat of any size to be built in South Australia; her first master F. Finney.

Ward purchased the cutter in 1850 and enlarged her to 27 tons burthen, and from January 1851 to May 1854 he was plying her between Adelaide, what is now the Fleurieu Peninsula, Kangaroo Island and Yorke Peninsula, delivering supplies and returning with wheat and wool.

On 19 May 1854 O.G. left Port Adelaide for Yankalilla and Rapid Bay, Captain Reid in command. After weighing anchor at Yankalilla on the afternoon of 23 May, the wind began to blow hard and increased to a heavy gale. The cutter was very light, having discharged nearly all her cargo, and Captain Reid found it impossible to prevent her from driving ashore, so let go his anchor as a last resort, but the cutter dragged anchor and soon foundered on the rocks at Poole's Flat, about 2 km north of Second Valley. Captain and crew took to the boat, and with some difficulty ran her up a creek and there were no deaths. The ship was a total wreck; her burthen was only 20 tons, and therefore uninsured and Captain Reid's loss was estimated at over £300. The site of the wreck was later known as Cutter Flat in recognition of the event.

=== Brig Punch ===
Punch, 150 tons, was a fine little brig owned by Adelaide businessmen Thomas Allen, George Henry Fox, Barnett, and others. Allen was in April 1853 deposed as captain by the majority of owners, and replaced with Sayers, to Allen's disgust, as he had no faith in Sayers' seamanship.

On the morning of 10 September 1853 a gale blew up and she was pushed on-shore and stranded on the beach near Glenelg, though she suffered little damage. She was unloaded by bullock dray but remained stuck fast and could not be freed from the sand. On 20 September Ward purchased the brig "as is where is" for £250. He rigged a series of empty water barrels under her hull and waited for the next "king tide", which occurred on 20 December 1853, when she was without incident towed out to sea and around to Port Adelaide. Ward traded with her to India, Java, and Eastern settlements. until 1856, when he sold her in Singapore.

=== Schooners ===
In May 1852 Captain Dowsett in the Government schooner Yatala discovered Port Augusta. In 1856 Ward bought the schooners Alice Martin (previously Flying Eagle) and Waitemata for the trade between Port Adelaide and Port Augusta and other ports. Waitemata, facetiously dubbed "Weighty Matter", gained some notoriety as the vessel in which "Bully" Hayes escaped from Adelaide early in 1858.

=== Steamships ===
Around 1852 Ward became associated with Darwent, Stilling, & Co., founded by the American entrepreneur Joseph Darwent, and to further their projects purchased the iron-hulled screw steamer Marion (124 tons), which he brought back from Melbourne and commanded until 1860, running regular services to Port Augusta. Elder, Stirling, & Co. then joined with Darwent, Stilling, & Co., and commissioned Ward to travel to Glasgow to either purchase or have built a coasting steamer. In the event he had built the iron screw steamer Lubra (167 tons), which he brought back under sail as a three-masted schooner, arriving in Adelaide in June 1861.

Ward did not have the appropriate certification for an overseas voyage, so had a relative, Captain William Orchard, command the ship. Orchard then had a considerable career as skipper of Ashburton in 1862, Kangaroo in 1865, and the wool ship Pekina 1866–1873, 1877.
Alexander McCoy became master of the Marion when Ward became involved with Lubra, and continued until she was wrecked on southern Yorke Peninsula in July 1862.

In 1862 the screw steamer Coorong was built; the company in 1864 purchased Royal Shepherd (244 tons), of which Ward was skipper from 1865 to 1872, and Kangaroo in July 1867. The Lubra, Kangaroo, and Royal Shepherd had little or no opposition for many years in the South Australian coastal trade. Joseph Stilling died in 1863, and when Stirling retired the company became Elder, Smith & Co. Darwent & Dalwood lost a fortune over their involvement with the Overland Telegraph Line and in 1871 sold their shares in the steamships, and Ward also sold out to return to sailing ships.

In 1874 the company sent Capt. Joseph Hay (c. 1832–1894), son-in-law of Henry Fletcher (shipwright) (1820–1912), of Fletcher's "Dunnikier" Slip, to England to commission a new steamer, and in March 1875 brought back the Flinders, that went into the coasting trade, in charge of Capt. T. W. Lockyer (c. 1836–1898). The Adelaide Steamship Company was arguably formed about June 1876, and among its assets were the Flinders, Lubra, Kangaroo, and Royal Shepherd.

=== Barque Day Dawn ===
After Ward quit steamers he purchased the barques Wodonga in 1872, Phoenix in 1875 and Day Dawn (frequently Daydawn) in 1878. Day Dawn is remembered as one on which Frank T. Bullen (author of The Cruise of the Cachalot) served as ship's mate. Hansford Ward's son John was the ship's captain from the start, except on voyages outside Australian waters, when Hansford Ward was (at least nominally) in charge. On one such voyage in 1879, on returning from Nouméa by way of Newcastle with a load of copper ore, she was dismasted and lay in a disabled and distressed condition until rescued by the Ellamang 20 miles (32 km) off Cape Moreton. John Ward skippered her for nine years, then in July 1886 after loading a cargo of railway sleepers at Quindalup, Western Australia a storm came up and blew her onto the shore, where she was wrecked. John Ward returned to Adelaide as chief officer of Collingrove, and shortly after was appointed captain of the Persian Empire plying between Melbourne and San Francisco.

== Other activities ==
For 21 years he was a licensed marine surveyor at Port Adelaide, but relinquished that occupation because of failing health around 1900.

== Family ==
(John Ralph) Hansford Ward (1817–1903) married Jane Best (c. 1819 – 29 March 1887) in August 1840. She was eldest daughter of (James) Richard Best ( – 1 January 1850); arrived in South Australia aboard Rajasthan in February 1840. Their children included:

- (Harry) Hansford Ward (22 April 1850 – 10 June 1916) married Julia Sholl in 1877; he was also a ship's captain.

- Harry Lancelot Ward (1881–1955) married Florence Hindmarsh Plumley in 1912

- John R(alph) H(ansford) Ward (8 April 1852– ) He was also a seaman, trained with his uncle on Pekina, acting captain of Day Dawn when she was incapacitated 1879, and her captain when she was stranded at Quindalup, Western Australia in 1887. By 1916 he was living in London.

They had a home in Newcastle street, Rosatala ward, Port Adelaide.

His brother Richard Porter Ward (c. 1823 – 25 March 1898) was captain of barques Bosphorus 1867–1870, Wodonga 1873–1875, and Phoenix 1876–1884. He had several daughters including:

- Mary Louisa Ward ( – 1949) married William Henry Saunders (1852 – 26 June 1928) in 1876. He was town clerk of Port Adelaide and brother of amateur historian A. T. Saunders.
