= The International Book and Publishing Company =

Publishing sector of H.B. Claflin & Company

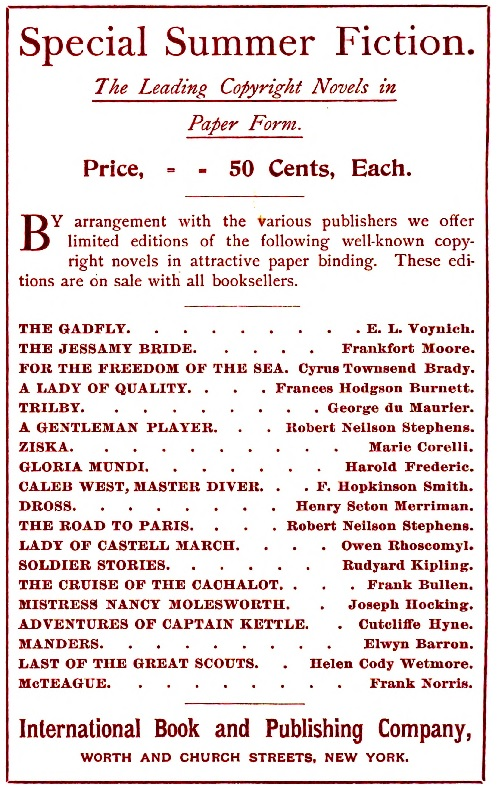
International Book and Publishing Company advertisement

The International Book and Publishing Company was the publishing imprint of H.B. Claflin & Company of New York. They published limited editions of copyright novels by arrangement with various publishers, selling these books in paper bindings and at low cost. The company seems to have published only during the years 1899 and 1900.

== History ==
At the close of the nineteenth century, major changes were taking place in the American book trade. Perhaps up to ninety percent of books then sold in the United States were being sold through department stores. At that time, H. B. Claflin Company was by far the largest wholesale dry goods business in New York City, selling a wide variety of goods to department stores and others. George E. Brightson was then the head of the Notions Department at the H. B. Claflin Company. Around 1897, Brightson proposed adding a book section to his notions department, and Claflin agreed.

About 35 additional employees were hired to work in the book section of Brightson's department, bringing the total staff in the Claflin notions department to about 200 employees. In addition to selling books from other publishers, Claflin launched its own publishing company in 1899. The publishing company was named "The International Book and Publishing Company" and was incorporated on July 19, 1899. Department Head George Brightson was one of the original incorporators of this company. It published under the imprint "The International Book and Publishing Company". Few people who bought these books were aware they were actually purchasing books from a Claflin company.

From the start, book sales by the H. B. Claflin Company were brisk. It soon became one of the major purveyors of books in the United States, with its total book sales reportedly doubling each year between 1897 and 1900. Claflin encouraged department stores around the country to add book departments. The Claflin company was what was known as a "jobber", buying large quantities of popular books from publishers and selling to the trade. At the same time, through their International Book and Publishing Company imprint, Claflin was actively publishing reprints of popular titles with permission from the copyright holders. Claflin soon became a major player in the American book market. H. B. Claflin sold "Special Edition" books under their International Book and Publishing Company imprint at prices more affordable to the general public. Reprints such as these made quality literature of the day accessible to larger readerships. For example, in 1899 The International Book and Publishing Company published several authorized printings of McTeague, which sold at retail for fifty cents each, using the International Book and Publishing Company imprint.

Claflin's decision to publish and market books was reflective of a larger industry trend at the time. Dry goods stores or department stores were becoming the universal providers of books to the reading public. Dry goods and department stores were adding or enlarging book departments. Often they competed by cutting prices. In this way, department stores were bringing in a new class of readers, as books became common merchandise for the first time. Profit margins were low and publishers could easily lose money due to poor publishing decisions. Book departments helped draw customers into the stores, so many department stores were willing to sell books at low profit margins, or perhaps even to sell books at a loss in order to bring shoppers into their stores. The competition was in fact so fierce that many booksellers of the day were going out of business, unable to compete with the department store book departments. In response, combinations of booksellers were exploring strategies such as price fixing to become more competitive versus the department stores. A popular novel of the day even commented on the situation.

It was into this environment that the Claflin company published its first "International Book and Publishing Company" titles in 1899. These were low-cost editions of popular titles, which were popular gift items during the holiday season. However, problems soon arose for Claflin's book operation. In 1900, Mr. Claflin expressed concern with the way the book section of the notions department was being managed. This ultimately led him to dismiss Brightson from his employ. Brightson then sued H. B. Claflin Company for breach of contract, seeking $50,000 in damages from his former employer. Brightson's lawsuit against the company eventually went to the New York Supreme Court. Each side made many arguments which are documented in the court records.

The Claflin Company alleged that Brightson had accumulated an excess inventory of books. Moreover, Claflin alleged that an accounting error in the 1899 book inventory, either intentionally or due to his neglect, had resulted in Brightson being overpaid in that year. Brightson's attorneys, in his defense, stated that neither the excessive inventory nor the accounting error were matters within Brightson's control. Moreover, Brightson argued that to attempt to reduce the book inventory too quickly would be disastrous to the business. There were also disagreements as to the terms of Brightson's employment contract, which had not been kept up to date in writing. At the conclusion of the trial, the jury found for Mr. Brightson. The jury awarded him $5,000 plus an additional $50,000 for damages for loss of salary, commissions, and injury to his reputation. However, the New York Court of Appeals subsequently vacated the $50,000 damages award.

Clearance sales were held in 1900, ahead of the holiday season, to reduce the Claflin book inventory. In 1900, the International Book and Publishing Company distributed the fifty-fifth thousand printing of The Damnation of Theron Ware by Harold Frederic. Although this book bore the imprint of Herbert S. Stone & Co., they rebound the book in their customary style. For the publisher’s name on the spine, the name “Frederic” was substituted. After the tumultuous year of 1900, the International Book and Publishing Company was apparently defunct. The company seems never to have published another book after 1900. In 1907, its New Jersey corporation was renamed. Its former department head, George Brightson, went on to lead larger businesses later in life. Although over 50 when he left the H. B. Claflin Company, he later founded the Sonora Phonograph Company, which had sales of $5.7 million in 1919, and Brightson Laboratories. In 1914, The H.B. Claflin Company, although still one of the largest mercantile businesses in the world, was unable to secure financing and went into receivership on June 25, 1914. In 1928, George Brightson, now retired from business, died from injuries sustained in a collision with a horse-drawn vehicle.

== Selected publications ==
- du Maurier, George (1899). Trilby. New York: International Book and Publishing Company.
- Burnett, Frances Hodgson (1899). A Lady of Quality. New York: International Book and Publishing Company.
- Smith, Francis Hopkinson (1899). Caleb West Master Diver. New York: International Book and Publishing Company.
- Bullen, Frank Thomas (1899). The Cruise of the Cachalot: Round the World After Sperm Whales. New York: International Book and Publishing Company.
- Merriman, Henry Seton (1899). Dross. New York: International Book and Publishing Company.
- Rhoscomyl, Owen (1899). The Lady of Castell March. New York: International Book and Publishing Company.
- Penn, William (1899). Penn's School for "Coin" and his critics. New York: International Book and Publishing Company.
- Mitchell, Silas Weir (1899). The Adventures of Francois: Foundling, Thief, ... New York: International Book and Publishing Company.
- Stephens, Robert Neilson (1899). The continental dragoon : a love story of Philipse manor-house in 1778 /. New York: International Book and Publishing Company.
- Barr, Robert (1899). Tekla. New York: International Book and Publishing Company.
- Kipling, Rudyard (1899). Soldier Stories. New York: International Book and Publishing Company.
- Ridpath, John Clark (1899). United States, a history : the most complete and most popular history of the United States of America from the aboriginal times to the present day ... /. New York: International Book and Publishing Company.
- Stephens, Robert Neilson (1899). The Road to Paris. New York: International Book and Publishing Company.
- Ford, Paul Leicester (1899). The Honorable Peter Stirling and what people thought of him. New York: International Book and Publishing Company.
- Optic, Oliver (1899). All Aboard, or Life on the Lake. New York: International Book and Publishing Company.
- Brassey, Anna (1899). A Voyage in the Sunbeam. New York: International Book and Publishing Company.
- Frederic, Harold (1899). Gloria Mundi. New York: International Book and Publishing Company.
- Hewlett, Maurice (1899). The forest lovers; a romance. New York: International Book and Publishing Company.
- French, Henry Willard (1899). Our boys in China: the thrilling story of two young Americans …. New York: International Book and Publishing Company.
- Howells, William Dean (1900). The Landlord at the Lion's Head. New York: International Book and Publishing Company.
- Voynich, Ethel (1900). The Gadfly. New York: International Book and Publishing Company.
- Norris, Frank (1900). McTeague: A Story of San Francisco. New York: International Book and Publishing Company.
- Moore, F. Frankfort (1900). The Jessamy Bride. New York: International Book and Publishing Company.
- Albee, John (1900). Remembrances of Emerson. New York: International Book and Publishing Company.
- Jewell, A. Irene (1900). Murile Sterling: A Tale of the African Veldt. New York: International Book and Publishing Company.
- Barron, Elwyn (1900). Manders : a tale of Paris. New York: International Book and Publishing Company.
- Wetmore, Helen Cody (1900). Last of the great scouts; the life story of Col. William F. Cody ("Buffalo Bill") as told by his sister. New York: International Book and Publishing Company.
- Stephens, Robert Neilson (1900). A gentleman player; his adventures on a secret mission for Queen Elizabeth. Illustrated. New York: International Book and Publishing Company.
- Corelli, Marie (1900). ZISKA The Problem of a Wicked Soul. New York: International Book and Publishing Company.
- Brady, Cyrus Townsend (1900). For the Freedom of the Sea: A Romance of the War of 1812. New York: International Book and Publishing Company.
