= Saint Peter and Saint Paul Archipelago =

Archipelago in the Atlantic Ocean belonging to Brazil

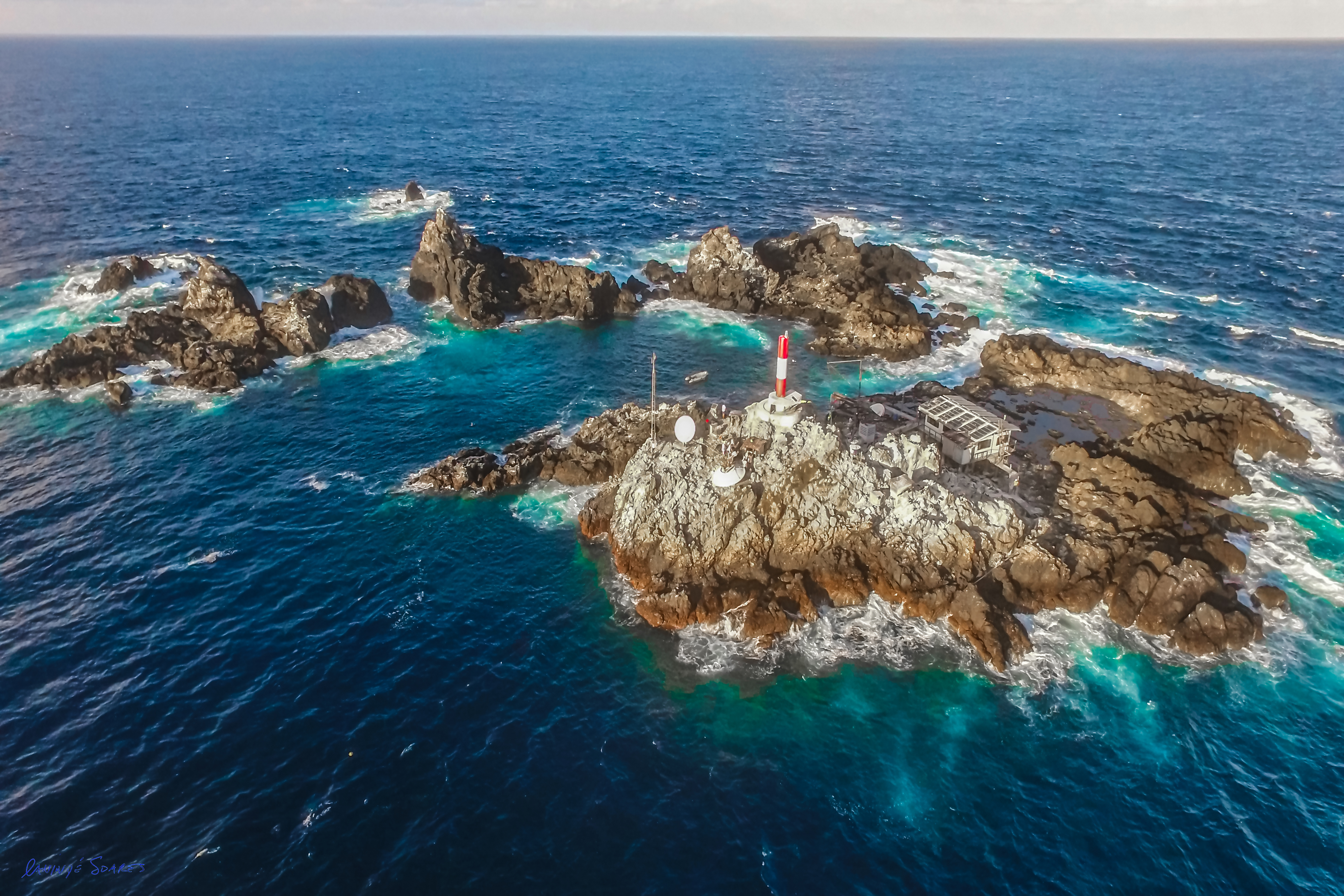
- Brazilian Navy scientific station and lighthouse of the Saint Peter and Saint Paul Archipelago

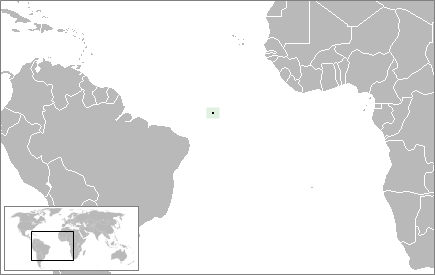

Geography
- Location: Atlantic Ocean
- Coordinates: 00°55′1″N 29°20′45″W
- Archipelago: Arquipélago de São Pedro e São Paulo
- Total islands: 15
- Major islands: Belmonte, Challenger, Nordeste, Cabral, South
- Area: 1.5 ha (3.7 acres)
- Highest elevation: 17 m (56 ft)

Administration
- Brazil
- Region: Northeast
- State: Pernambuco

Demographics
- Population: 4

Additional information
- Time zone: Fernando de Noronha time (UTC-02:00)
- Official website: www.mar.mil.br/secirm/proarq.htm

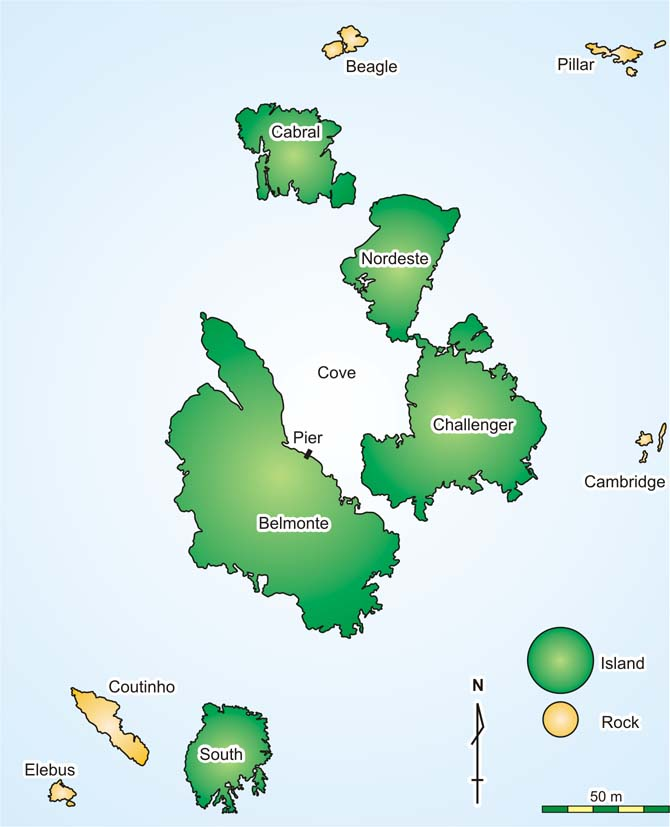
Map of the Saint Peter and Saint Paul Archipelago

The Saint Peter and Saint Paul Archipelago (Portuguese: Arquipélago de São Pedro e São Paulo [ɐʁkiˈpɛlɐgu dʒi sɐ̃w ˈpedɾwi sɐ̃w ˈpawlu]) is a group of 15 small islets and rocks in the central equatorial Atlantic Ocean. It lies in the Intertropical Convergence Zone, a region of the Atlantic characterized by low average winds punctuated with local thunderstorms. It lies about 510 nmi (940 km; 590 mi) from the nearest point of mainland South America (the northeastern Brazilian coastal town of Touros); 625 km (388 mi) northeast of the archipelago of Fernando de Noronha; 990 km (620 mi) from the city of Natal; and 1,824 km (1,133 mi) from the west coast of Africa. Administratively, the archipelago belongs to Brazil and is part of the special "state district" (Portuguese: distrito estadual) of Fernando de Noronha, in the state of Pernambuco, in spite of the very large distance between the two island groups and the even larger distance to the state mainland.

In 1986, the archipelago was designated an environmentally protected area. This is now part of the Fernando de Noronha Environmental Protection Area. Since 1998, the Brazilian Navy has maintained a permanently staffed research facility on the islands. The main economic activity around the islets is tuna fishing.

== History ==
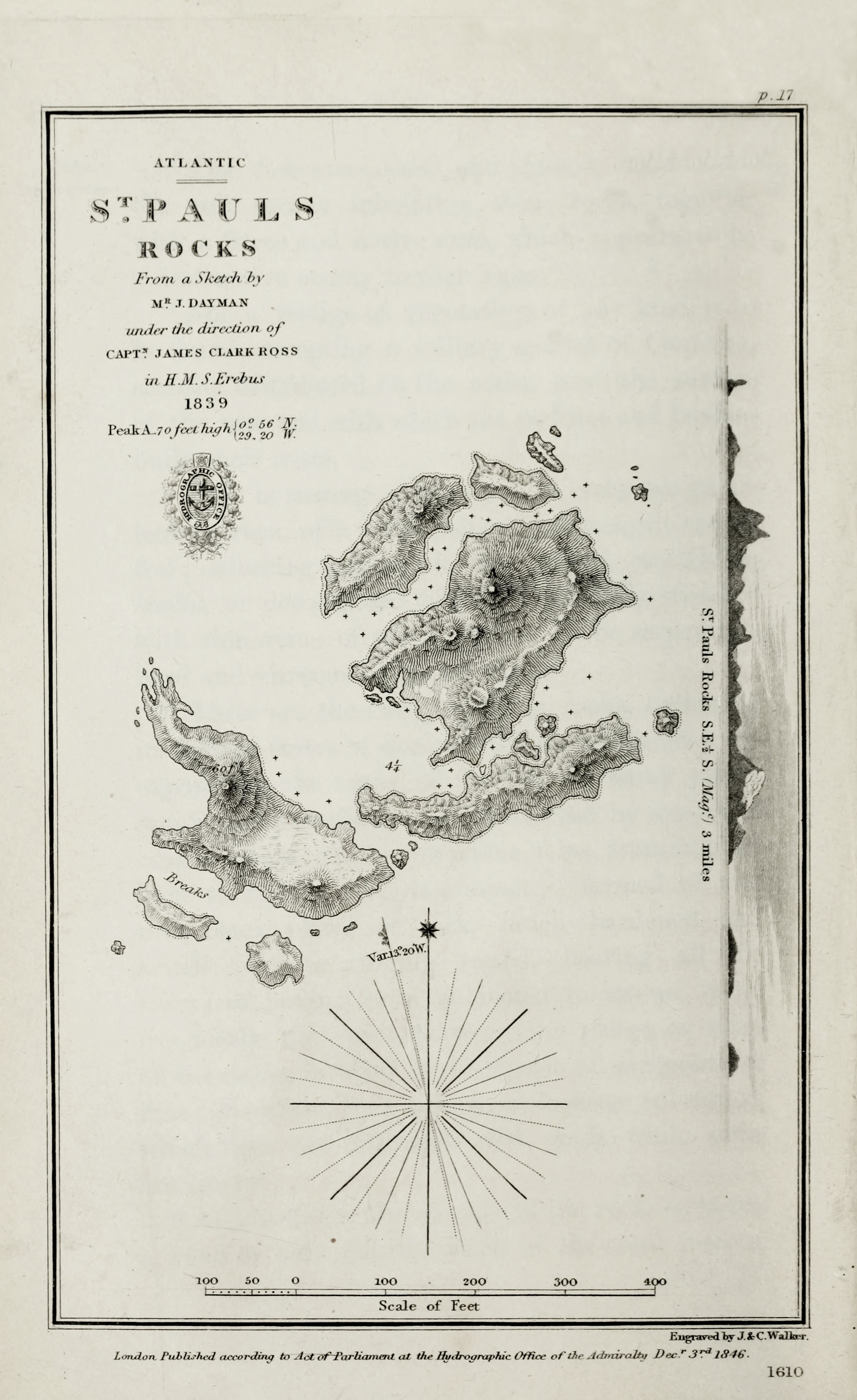
Chart of 1839 by HMS Erebus

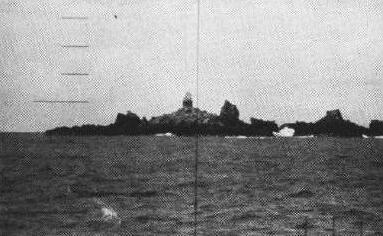
Periscope eyeview from USS Triton (1960)

On April 20, 1511, a Portuguese Navy fleet composed of six caravels under the command of Captain Garcia de Noronha discovered the islets by accident while on their journey to India. While navigating in the open sea late at night, the Saint Peter caravel, under the command of Captain Manuel de Castro Alcoforado, crashed against the islets. The crew was rescued by the Saint Paul caravel, forming the name given to the islets.

In December 1799, the American captain Amasa Delano landed on the islets. He spent an afternoon and one night on the rocks.

On the morning of February 16, 1832, the rocks were visited by Charles Darwin on the first leg of his voyage on HMS Beagle around the world. Darwin listed all the fauna he could find, noting that not a single plant or even a lichen could be found on the island.

The rocks, then called "St. Paul's Rocks", were visited by James Clark Ross on 29 November 1839. He was in charge of an expedition to the Antarctic regions with two vessels, HMS Erebus and HMS Terror. Robert McCormick gave some geological and biological remarks on St. Paul's Rocks in the report on the expedition.

Another famous person to visit the rocks was Ernest Shackleton, on his last expedition to Antarctica (1921–1922).

In 1942, during World War II, the islets were declared to be part of the Federal Territory of Fernando de Noronha (which also included the Rocas Atoll).

In early 1960, the rocks served as the starting-point and terminus for the first submerged circumnavigation of the world by the American nuclear-powered submarine USS Triton.

In 1982 a wind anemometer with satellite telemetry reporting via GOES EAST satellite was installed by a team from Lamont-Doherty Geological Observatory with help from the Francais Ocean Climat Atlantique (FOCAL) and the Captain and crew of the N/O CAPRICORNE. This installation was supported by National Science Foundation Grant #OCE 82–09982.

=== Scientific station ===
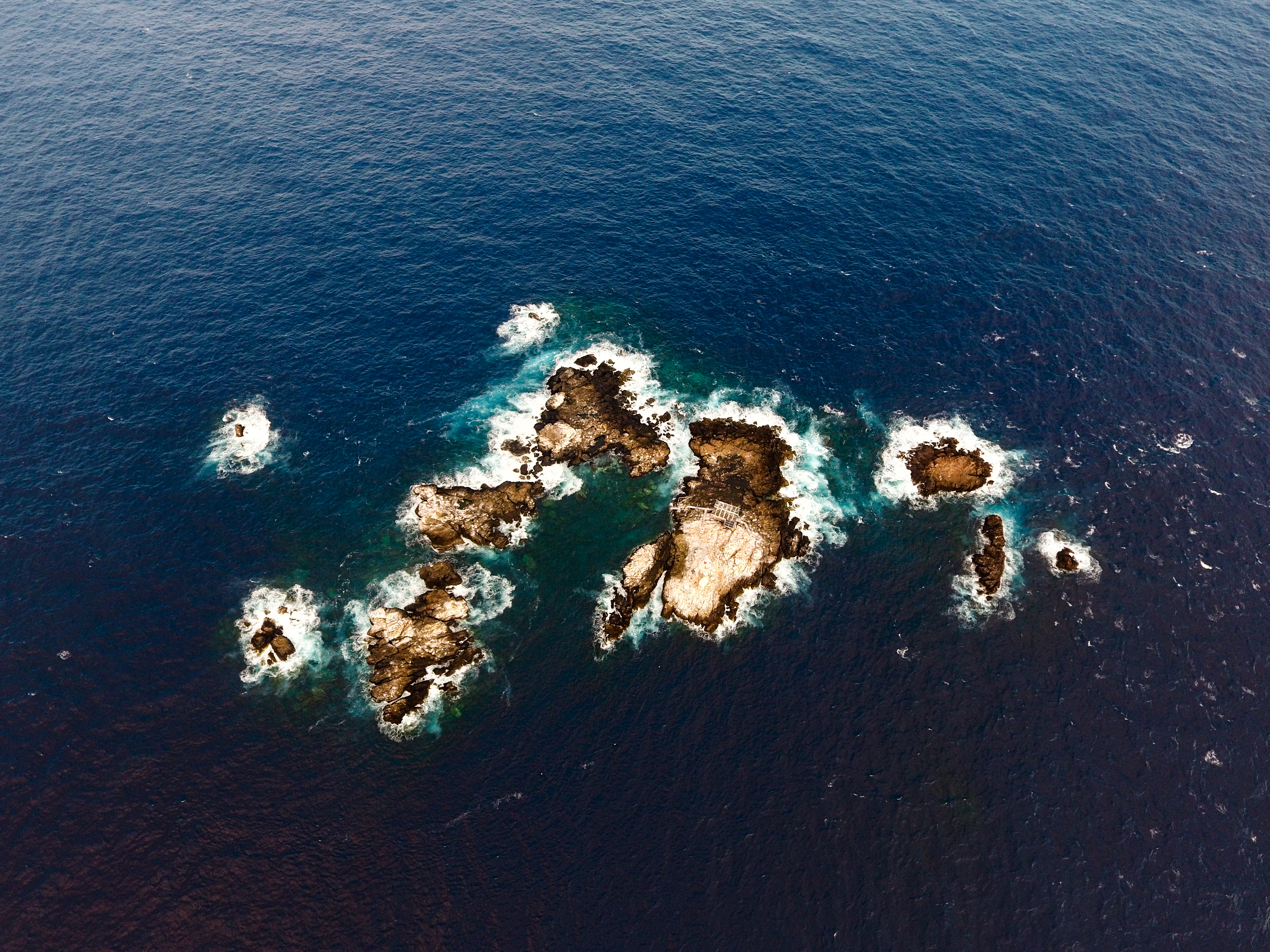
Aerial view of the islets. North is at the bottom left of the picture.

On June 25, 1998, the Brazilian Navy inaugurated the Saint Peter and Saint Paul Archipelago Scientific Station (Portuguese: Estação Científica do Arquipélago de São Pedro e São Paulo; ECASPSP). The station is staffed with four researchers, who are rotated in and out every 15 days. By maintaining permanent occupation of the archipelago, the Brazilian Navy extends Brazil's Exclusive Economic Zone, territorial waters and airspace into the North Atlantic Ocean.

On June 5, 2006, the archipelago was shaken by an earthquake of magnitude 6.0 (with epicenter about 140 km to the east). The strong tidal surge following the earthquake caused the battery compartment to crash against the station's outer wall, allowing sea water to flood the station. The four researchers who were on the archipelago took shelter in the lighthouse, while maintaining constant contact with the Brazilian Navy. A fishing vessel located nearby rescued the researchers, who were then transferred to a Brazilian Navy patrol boat. The incident caused considerable damage to the station and equipment. The station was repaired on September 9–11, 2006, and became operational shortly after.

In 2007, the Brazilian Navy started to build a new scientific station on the archipelago. Construction began on July 24, 2007, and was completed on June 25, 2008. The new station was built with seismic isolation, and is considerably larger and better equipped than the previous one. The station is composed of a main building – equipped with reverse osmosis salt water desalination system, photovoltaics system and satellite communications system; deposits and a mooring dock.

The Brazilian Navy also maintains a lighthouse, a focal light at 29 m above average sea level of 18 m lower, where the device was mounted, total height of 10.95 m, Base 2.5 m Cement, Tower 7.95 m, 3 Section of 2.65 m, Antenna 0,5 m, on the archipelago (ARLHS: SPP-001), built in 1995 to replace a previous one from 1930. Mast Communication Besides of 15 m High.

=== Air France Flight 447 ===
On June 1, 2009, Air France Flight 447, an Airbus A330-200 jetliner en route from Rio de Janeiro to Paris, crashed in the Atlantic Ocean near the Saint Peter and Saint Paul Archipelago, killing all 228 people on board. Bodies and fragments of the aircraft were found just northwest of the archipelago.

== Geography ==
The Saint Peter and Saint Paul Rocks are in the Atlantic Ocean, 100 km (62 mi) north of the Equator, and are the only group of Brazilian oceanic islets in the Northern Hemisphere. The nearest point in the Brazilian coast, is Cabo do Calcanhar, Rio Grande do Norte, about 1,010 kilometres (630 mi) from the archipelago. The total emerged area is about 4.2 acres (1.7 ha) and the maximum land elevation is 18 m (59 ft), on Nordeste Island. The archipelago is composed of several rocks, five small rocky islets and four larger islets:

- Belmonte Islet: 5,380 square metres (1.33 acres)
- Challenger Islet (also known as São Paulo): 3,000 square metres (0.74 acres)
- Nordeste Islet (also known as São Pedro): 1,440 square metres (0.36 acres)
- Cabral Islet: 1,170 square metres (0.29 acres)
- South Islet: 943 square metres (0.233 acres).

Their base is over 3,650 metres (11,980 ft) below sea level.

None of the islets have a permanent fresh water supply available.

== Geology ==
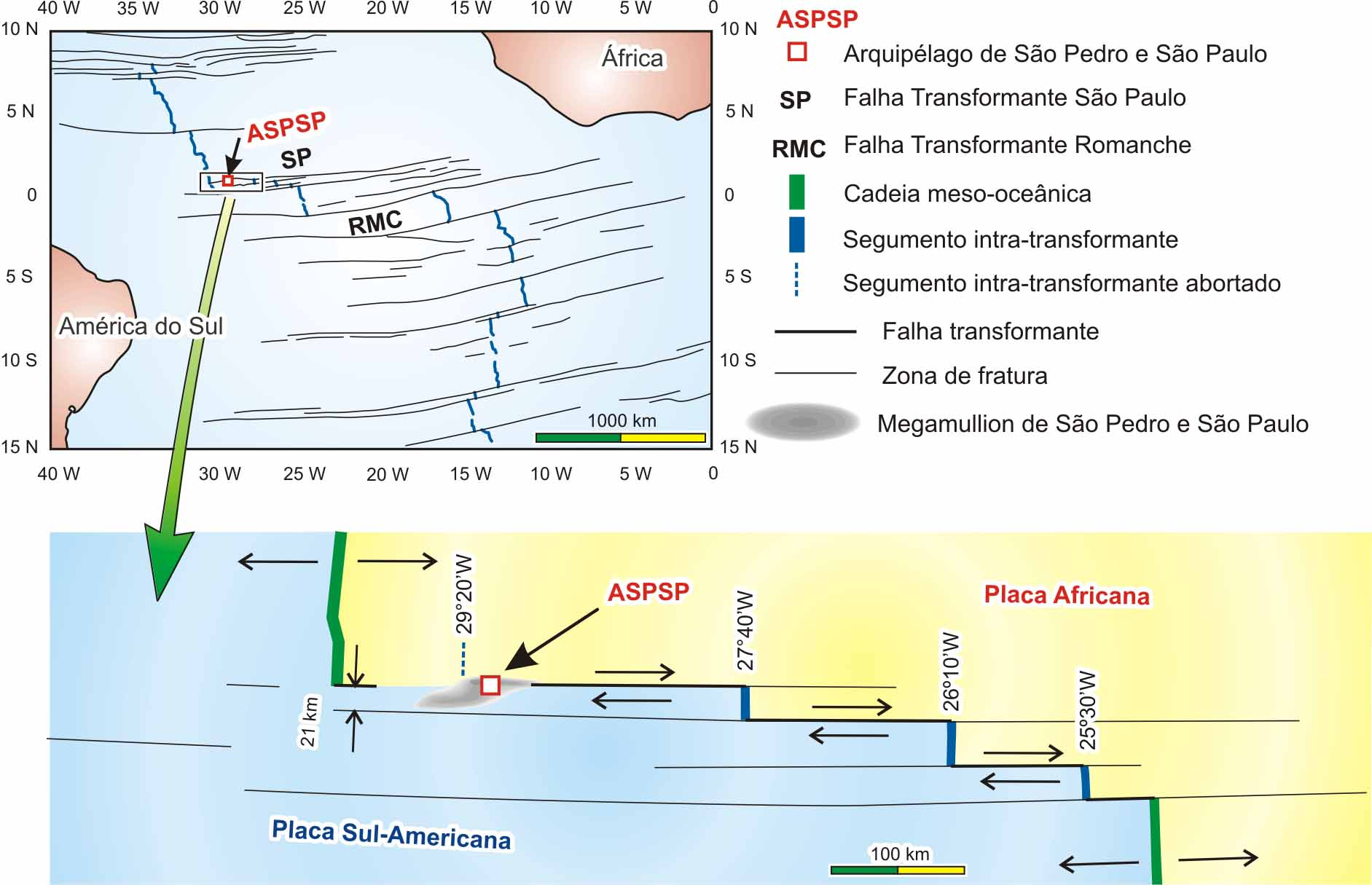
The location of the archipelago on the junction between the African and South American plates.

The islets expose serpentinized abyssal mantle peridotite and kaersutite-bearing ultramafic mylonite atop the world's highest and yet only second-largest megamullion (after the Parece Vela megamullion under Okinotorishima in the Pacific Ocean). This grouping is the sole location in the Atlantic Ocean where the abyssal mantle is exposed above sea level. Darwin noted in 1832 that, unusually, these small islands were not volcanic, but were instead formed by a geologic uplift.

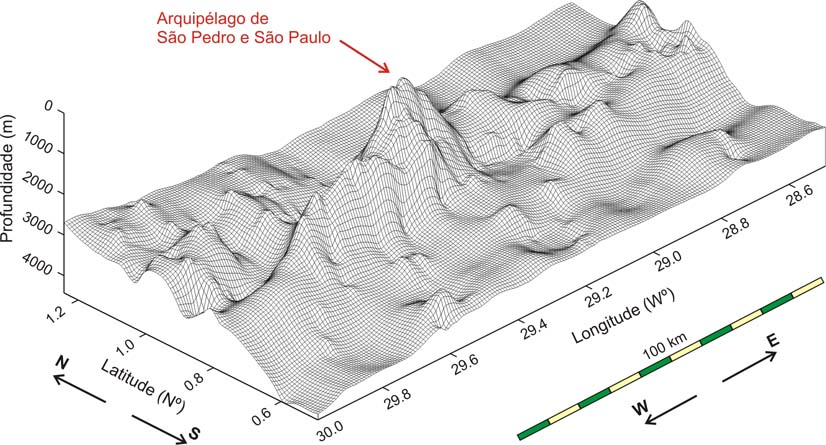
Abyssal morphology around the Saint Peter and Saint Paul Archipelago.

=== Undersea morphology ===
The São Pedro and São Paulo Archipelago is located in the expansion zone between the South American Plate and the African Plate. The São Paulo Transform Fault System is one of the largest transform faults in the Atlantic Ocean, in which there is a total of 630 km of discontinuity in the segments of the mid-ocean chain. This is one of the deepest regions of the Atlantic Ocean and some locations are over 5,000 meters deep. The abyssal morphology shows that the Archipelago is located at the top of an underwater morphological elevation, with a length of 100 km, a width of 20 km and an approximate height of 3,800 meters from the ocean floor, called the Peridotitic Chain of São Pedro and São Paul. Unlike submarine volcanoes, this ledge consists of two tabular elevations oriented east–west, presenting a shape similar to a Brachiosaurus dinosaur whose head faces east. On the flanks of the Archipelago, from sea level to a depth of 1,000 meters, high angle slopes occur, around 50º inclination. There is no extensive submarine platform of small depth around the Archipelago. To the south of the Archipelago there is a vertical cliff with a height greater than 2000 meters. These unstable submarine morphologies suggest that the uplift of the Archipelago originated from a recent tectonism, which continues until the present.

== Biology ==
Only the largest of the islets, Belmonte, is vegetated with mosses and grasses. The other rocks are mostly barren, except for some sea algae and fungi that can tolerate the salt spray. The rocks are inhabited by seabirds, including the brown booby (Sula leucogaster), brown noddy (Anous stolidus), and black noddy (Anous minutus), as well as crabs (Grapsus grapsus), insects, and spiders.

The islands are home to over 100 reef fishes, about 10% of which are found nowhere else in the world, including the extremely colorful Tosanoides aphrodite.

On his landing on the islands in 1832 Darwin found two birds, a booby and a brown noddy, a large crab that stole the fish intended for chicks, a fly that lived on the booby and a parasitic tick. He found a moth that lived on feathers, a beetle, a woodlouse that lived on dung, and numerous spiders that he thought lived on scavengers of the waterfowl. Darwin felt that these rocks represented how life first took hold on a newly formed outcrop.

== In literature ==
St. Paul's Rocks are mentioned twice in Frank T. Bullen's 1898 semi-autobiographical travel narrative The Cruise of the Cachalot.

The 1973 novel HMS Surprise by Patrick O'Brian describes a fictitious visit to one of the islands (called "St Paul's Rock" in the novel) by the character Dr Stephen Maturin. The specimens gathered by Maturin on the island are based on those historically collected by Darwin.
