= HMS Blanche (1867) =

Sloop of the Royal Navy

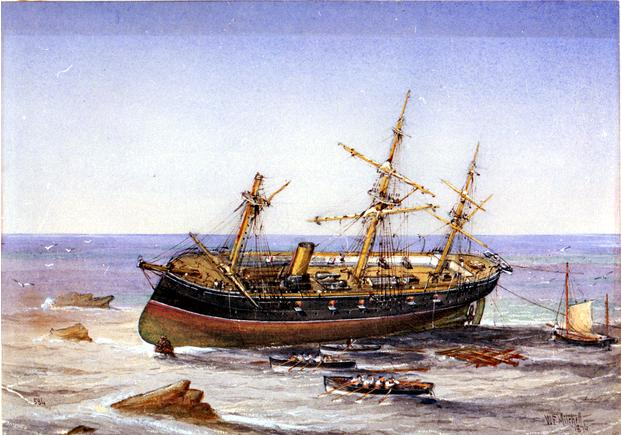
- Blanche aground (probably off New Hanover Island, Papua New Guinea in April 1870) by William Frederick Mitchell, 1874

History

United Kingdom
- Name: HMS Blanche
- Builder: Chatham Dockyard
- Laid down: 1865
- Launched: 17 August 1867
- Completed: November 1867
- Decommissioned: 1881
- Fate: Sold for scrap, September 1886

General characteristics (as built)
- Class & type: Eclipse-class wooden screw sloop (later corvette)
- Displacement: 1,760 long tons (1,790 t)
- Tons burthen: 1,268 bm
- Length: 212 ft (64.6 m) (p/p)
- Beam: 36 ft (11.0 m)
- Draught: 16 ft 6 in (5.0 m)
- Depth: 21 ft 6 in (6.6 m)
- Installed power: 2,158 ihp (1,609 kW)
- Propulsion: 1 shaft; 1 × 2-cylinder steam engine; 4 × rectangular boilers
- Sail plan: Barque rig
- Speed: 12 knots (22 km/h; 14 mph)
- Complement: 180
- Armament: 2 × 7-inch rifled muzzle-loading guns; 4 × 6.3-inch 64-pounder rifled muzzle-loading guns

HMS Blanche was a 1760-ton, 6-gun Eclipse-class wooden screw sloop built for the Royal Navy in the mid-1860s by Chatham Dockyard.

She was sent to the Australia Station in January 1868, arriving in April 1868. She undertook a punitive action against Solomon Island natives in September 1869. During 1870, she joined in the search for the schooner Daphne, which was unsuccessful. Under the command of Captain Cortland Simpson, she undertook a survey of Rabaul's Harbour in 1872. Blanche Bay is named after HMS Blanche. She finished service on the Australia Station in 1875. While sailing to England she was almost lost rounding Cape Horn in bad weather.

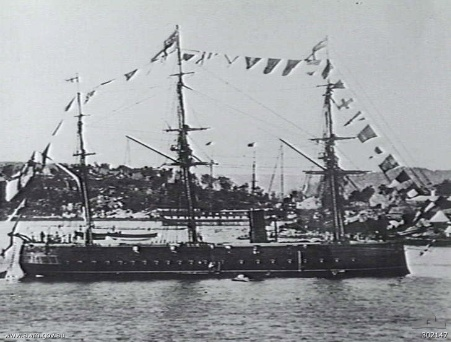
HMS Blanche

After being refitted and rearmed, she was sent to the North America and West Indies Station, where she remained until 1881.

== Crew ==
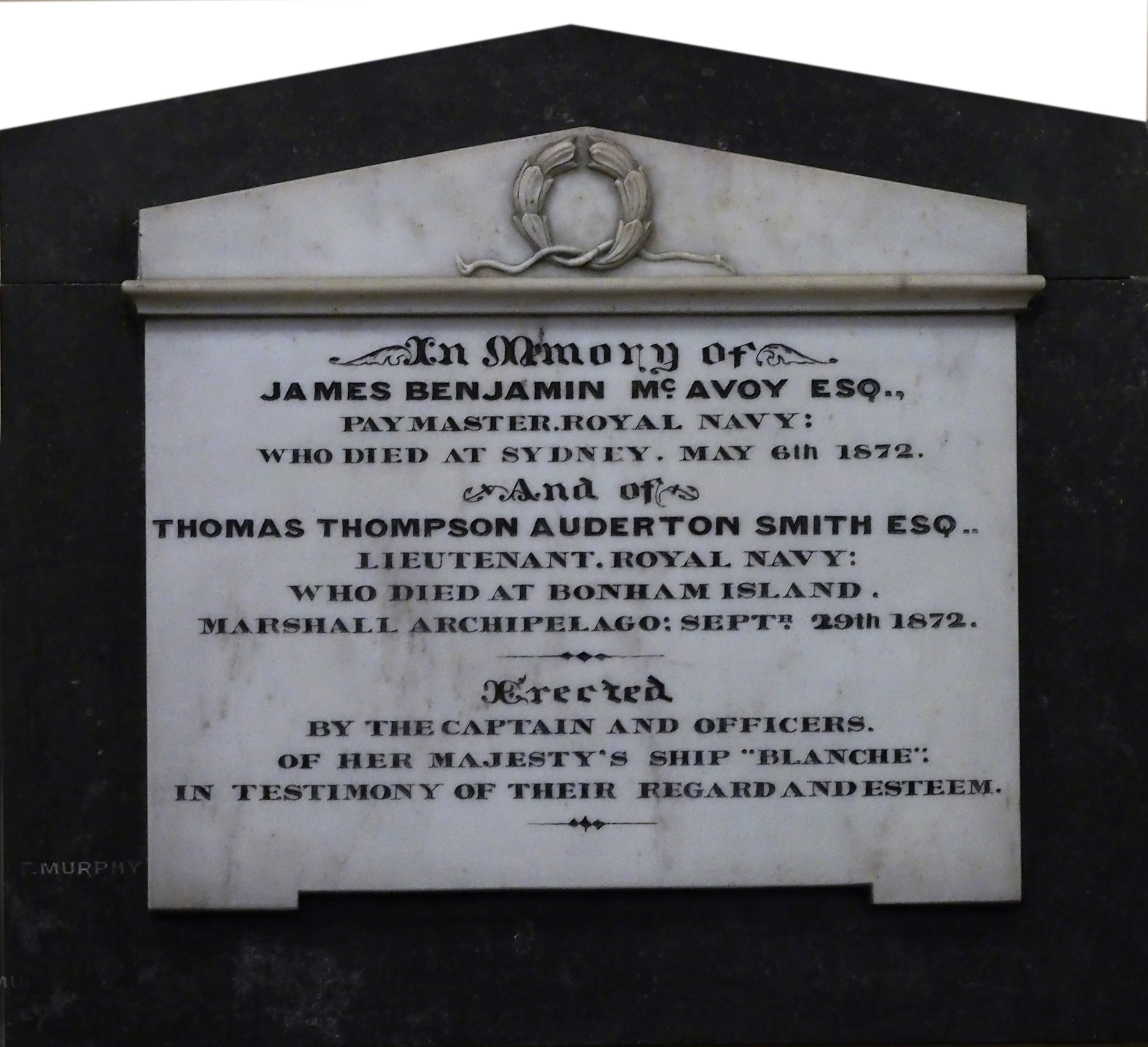
McAvoy & Smith memorial in St James' Church, Sydney (1872)

A memorial to Paymaster James McAvoy and Lieutenant Thomas Thompson Auderton Smith was erected in St James' Church, Sydney by the captain and officers of Blanche in 1872.

In 1871 the crew of Blanche (and HMS Rosario) were replaced by a new crew that sailed from the UK on HMS Megaera. However, it developed a serious leak in the Indian Ocean and was beached on Île Saint-Paul on 19 June 1871. They were marooned there for 3 months before being rescued and conveyed to Sydney on Malacca, a P&O steamer hired for the rescue. They arrived on 2 October 1871, and Blanche was recommissioned on the 12th.

In 1872 and 1873, the vessel patrolled the Pacific islands in search of blackbirders. In particular, they were on the lookout for Bully Hayes.

On 11 April 1872, Blanche was driven ashore on New Hanover Island. She was subsequently refloated. Repairs cost £2,450.

== Fate ==
She was placed in reserve and in 1886 was sold to Castle for £3,600 for breaking.

== Bibliography ==
- Ballard, G. A. (1938). "British Sloops of 1875: The Smaller Ram-Bowed Type". Mariner's Mirror. 24 (April). Cambridge, UK: Society for Nautical Research: 160–75.
- Bastock, John (1988), Ships on the Australia Station, Child & Associates Publishing; Frenchs Forest, Australia. ISBN 0-86777-348-0
- Chesneau, Roger; Kolesnik, Eugene M., eds. (1979). Conway's All the World's Fighting Ships 1860–1905. Greenwich, UK: Conway Maritime Press. ISBN 0-8317-0302-4.
- Rottman, Gordon L. (2001), World War II Pacific Island Guide: A Geo-Military Study, Greenwood Press; Santa Barbara, CA. ISBN 0-313-31395-4
- Lyon, David & Winfield, Rif (2004). The Sail and Steam Navy List: All the Ships of the Royal Navy 1815–1889. Chatham Publishing. ISBN 978-1-86176-032-6. OCLC 52620555.
