= Fernando de Noronha Marine National Park =

National park in Pernambuco, Brazil

- Parque Nacional Marinho de Fernando de Noronha
- IUCN category II (national park)
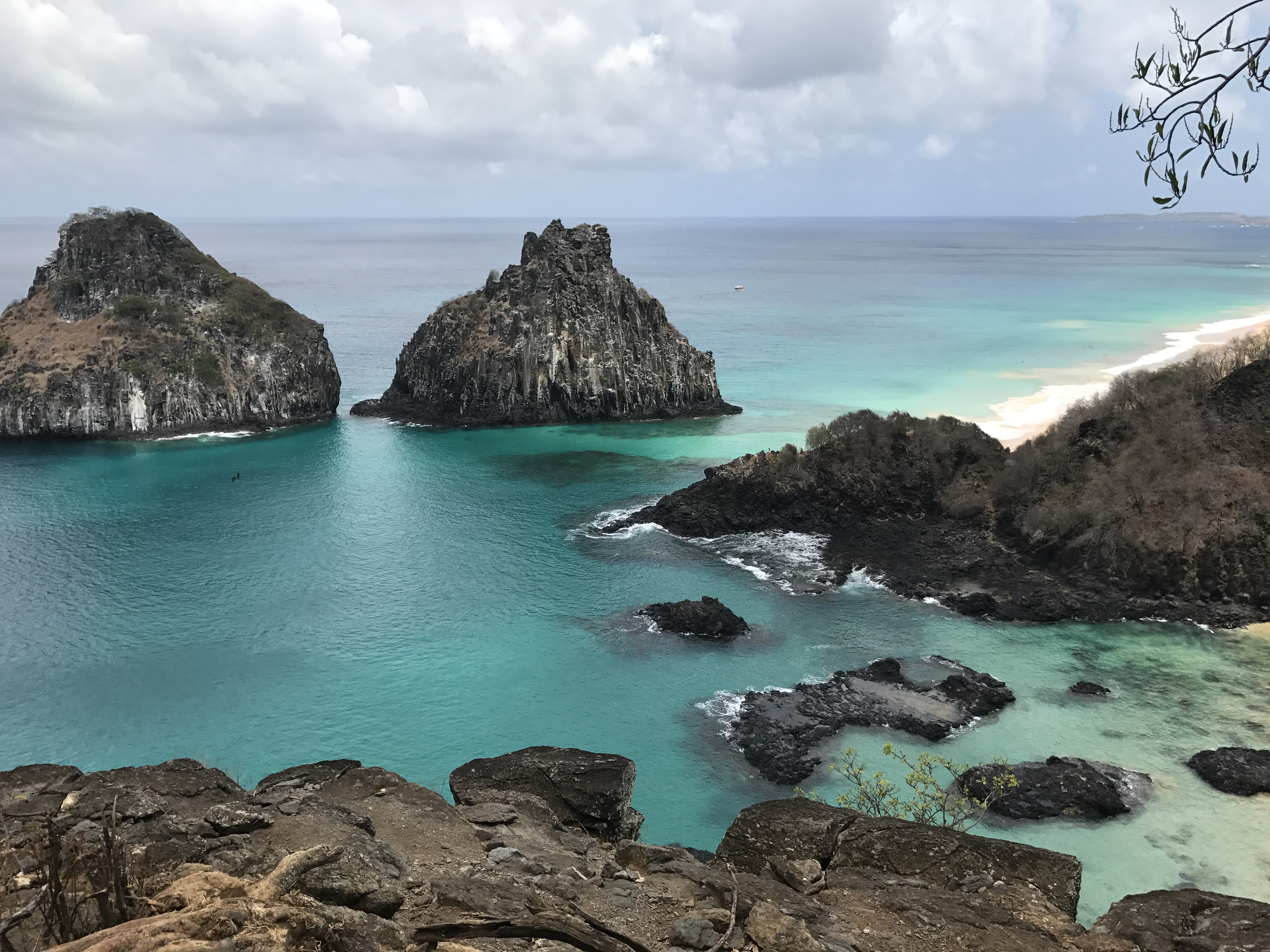

- Location within Brazil
- Nearest city: Fernando de Noronha, Pernambuco
- Coordinates: 3.867°S 32.446°W
- Designation: National park
- Administrator: Chico Mendes Institute for Biodiversity Conservation

Ramsar Wetland
- Official name: Fernando de Noronha Archipelago
- Designated: 25 January 2018
- Reference no.: 2333

Fernando de Noronha Marine National Park (Portuguese: Parque Nacional Marinho de Fernando de Noronha) is a national park in the state of Pernambuco, Brazil.

== Location ==
The Fernando de Noronha Marine National Park covers part of the island of Fernando de Noronha, a municipality of Pernambuco. It has an area of 10,927.64 hectares (27,002.8 acres). The Fernando de Noronha Environmental Protection Area covers the urban part of the island of Fernando de Noronha, while the Fernando de Noronha National Park covers the rest. The area includes a large marine extension to the Saint Peter and Saint Paul Archipelago, which is also in the National Park.

== Administration ==
The Fernando de Noronha Marine National Park was created by federal decree 96.693 on September 14, 1988. It is administered by the Chico Mendes Institute for Biodiversity Conservation (ICMBio). The park is classified as IUCN protected area category II (national park). The objective is to preserve a natural ecosystem of great ecological relevance and scenic beauty, and to support scientific research, environmental education and interpretation, outdoors recreation and ecotourism.

The unofficial management plan was released on 31 December 1990. The advisory council was named on 31 December 2001. A revised management plan with various studies was issued on 29 November 2010.

== Environment ==
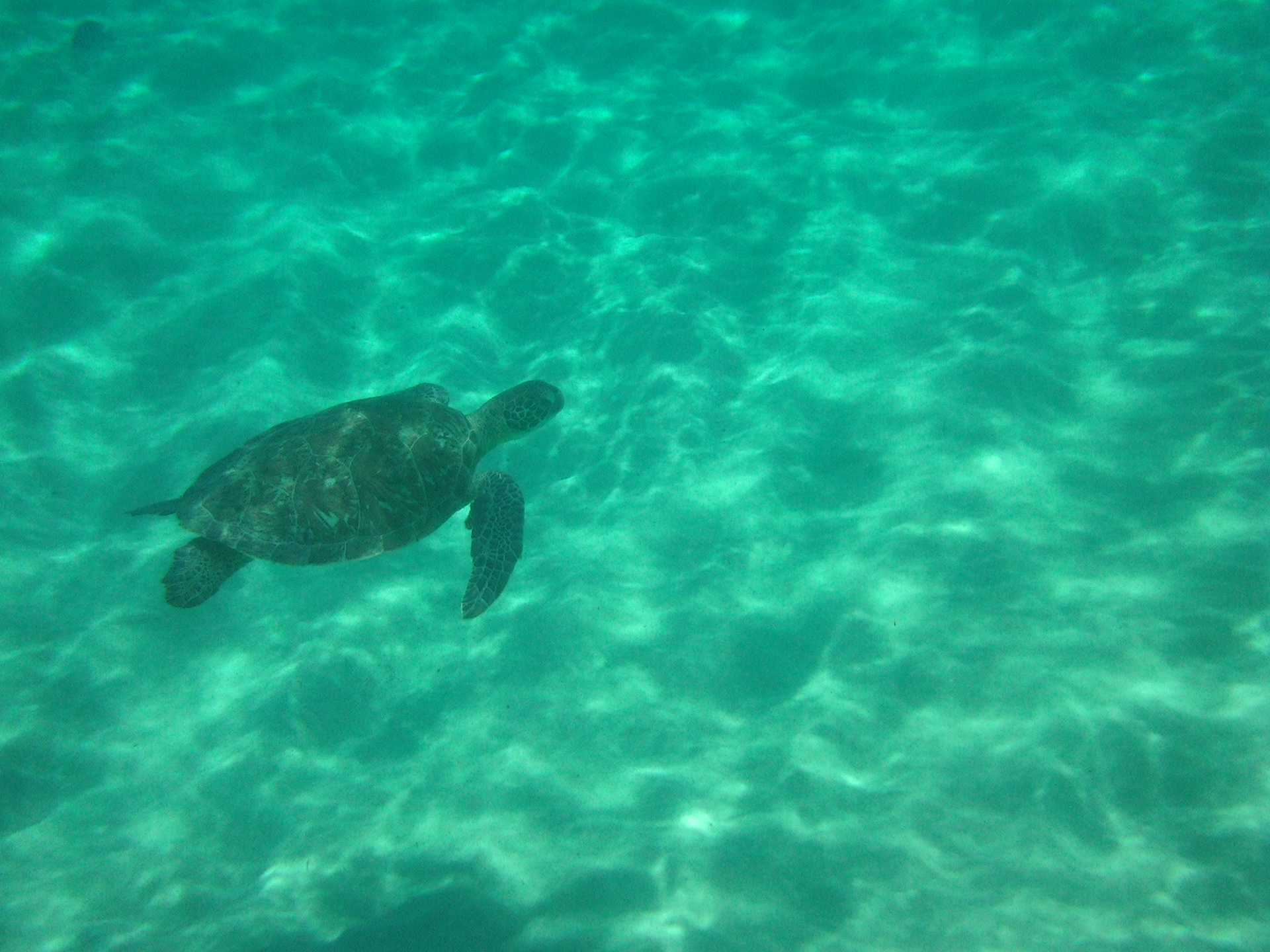
Turtle (Chelonia mydas) swimming in the waters of Fernando de Noronha

Much of the original vegetation of the island was cut when it was used as a prison, to make it harder for prisoners to hide. After that non-native species, particularly flaxseed, were introduced to feed livestock and have spread uncontrollably. The teju lizard was introduced in an unsuccessful attempt to control an infestation of rats, and the lizard is also a problem. Despite the stated objective of recovery of the environment, sheep continued to be farmed on the island.

Protected birds in the park include Noronha elaenia (Elaenia ridleyana), red-billed tropicbird (Phaethon aethereus), white-tailed tropicbird (Phaethon lepturus), Sargasso shearwater (Puffinus lherminieri), Noronha vireo (Vireo gracilirostris). Other protected species in the park include the crabs Johngarthia lagostoma and Percnon gibbesi, the loggerhead sea turtle (Caretta caretta), green sea turtle (Chelonia mydas), hawksbill sea turtle (Eretmochelys imbricata), olive ridley sea turtle (Lepidochelys olivacea), the lemon shark (Negaprion brevirostris), the starfish Echinaster (Othilia) guyanensis, the slate pencil urchin (Eucidaris tribuloides), the sea ginger coral Millepora alcicornis, and the coral Phyllogorgia dilatata.

== Sources ==
- Área de Proteção Ambiental Fernando de Noronha - Rocas - São Pedro e São Paulo (in Portuguese), Parque Nacional Marinho Fernando de Noronha, archived from the original on 2017-01-04
- "Área de Proteção Ambiental de Fernando de Noronha - Rocas - São Pedro e São Paulo", Via Rural (in Portuguese), archived from the original on 2017-01-04
- Parna Marinho de Fernando de Noronha (in Portuguese), Chico Mendes Institute for Biodiversity Conservation, archived from the original on 2021-02-25
- PARNA Marinho de Fernando de Noronha (in Portuguese), ISA: Instituto Socioambiental
- Unidade de Conservação: Parque Nacional Marinho de Fernando de Noronha (in Portuguese), MMA: Ministério do Meio Ambiente
