= H.B. Claflin & Company =

H.B. Claflin & Company was a Manhattan-based dry goods business which was incorporated in 1890. The company acted as wholesalers who were middlemen between manufacturers and retailers of dry goods. The corporation became insolvent in June 1914, with a debt of $34,000,000. Judge Learned Hand of the United States District Court in New York appointed receivers for the firm on June 25, 1914. The trade of the wholesaler was negatively affected by the migration of the dry goods industry to uptown Manhattan and a failure to adapt to the changing business landscape.

== History ==
=== Background and early years ===
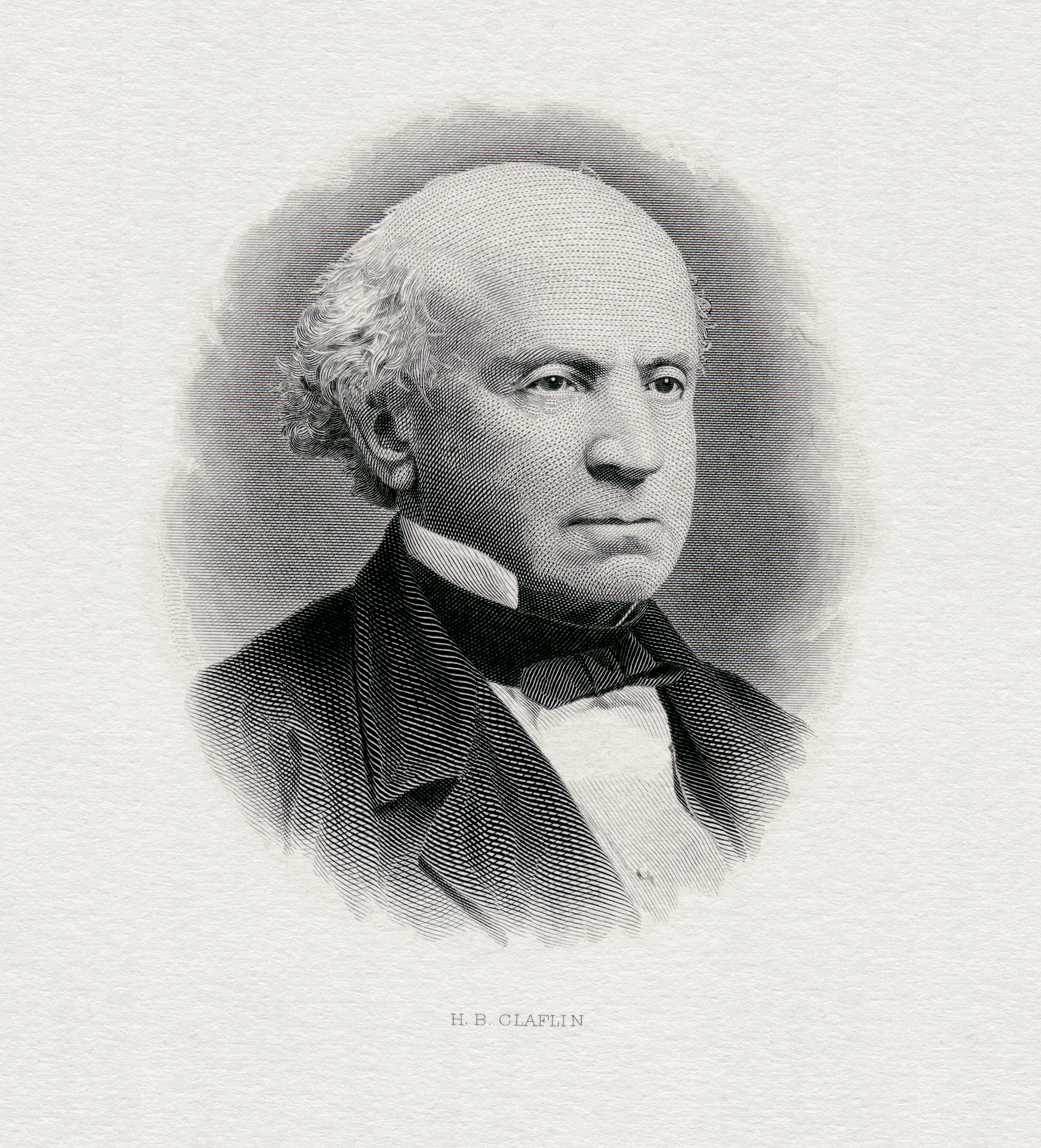
Horace Brigham Claflin

H.B. Claflin & Company began operations in 1843, many years before its official incorporation. In 1868, the company retained the same principal leaders from its start, namely Horace Brigham Claflin, E.E. Eames, and E.W. Bancroft. The main building of the business fronted Church Street (Manhattan) for one hundred feet and extended along Worth Street for another four hundred feet. It continued along West Broadway (Manhattan) for one hundred feet. All of its buildings occupied an area encompassing 48,000 square feet (4,500 m^{2}) in 1868. It employed 700 people full-time and up to 1,000 persons during the busiest seasons. The various departments of H.B. Claflin & Company dealt in lace goods, white goods, flannels, blankets, hosiery, shirts, underwear, shawls, hoods, scarves, and gloves. The company also sold books, and for several years published books under its own imprint The International Book and Publishing Company.

=== Later years ===
In 1914, the Claflin stores in New York were C.G. Gunther's Sons; Lord & Taylor; James McCreery & Company; O'Neill Adams Company; H. Batterman Company, Brooklyn; and the Bedford Company, Brooklyn. Claflin interests controlled an additional thirty stores located in various parts of the United States.
