= Savage Islands (film) =

1983 film by Ferdinand Fairfax

- Theatrical release poster
- Directed by: Ferdinand Fairfax
- Written by: John Hughes; David Odell
- Story by: David Odell
- Produced by: Lloyd Phillips; Rob Whitehouse
- Starring: Tommy Lee Jones; Michael O'Keefe; Max Phipps; Jenny Seagrove
- Cinematography: Tony Imi
- Edited by: John Shirley
- Music by: Trevor Jones
- Production company: Phillips-Whitehouse Productions
- Distributed by: Kerridge Odeon (Australia and New Zealand); Paramount Pictures (International)
- Release date: 18 November 1983
- Running time: 99 minutes
- Countries: New Zealand; United States
- Budget: NZ$7.5 million
- Box office: $1.9 million (domestic)

Savage Islands (also known as Nate and Hayes in the United States) is a 1983 swashbuckling adventure film set in the South Pacific in the late 19th century. Directed by Ferdinand Fairfax and filmed on location in Fiji and New Zealand, it starred Tommy Lee Jones, Michael O'Keefe and Jenny Seagrove.

It was one of several 1980s films designed to capitalize on the popularity of Indiana Jones, but Savage Islands was a flop at the box office.

== Plot ==
The film tells the story of missionary Nathaniel "Nate" Williamson, taken to an island mission with his fiancée Sophie. Their ship, the Rona, is captained by the roguish William "Bully" Hayes, who also takes a liking to Sophie. When Sophie is kidnapped by slave trader Ben Pease, "Nate" teams with Hayes in order to find her. The two men enjoy a friendly rivalry for Sophie's affections, and she is to some extent torn between them, though committed to Nate.

== Cast ==
- Tommy Lee Jones as Bully Hayes
- Michael O'Keefe as Nathaniel Williamson
- Max Phipps as Ben Pease
- Jenny Seagrove as Sophie
- Bruce Allpress as Mr. Blake
- Grant Tilly as Count von Rittenberg
- Peter Rowley as Louis Beck
- Prince Tui Teka as King of Ponape
- Roy Billing as Auctioneer

== Production ==
The story was based on the adventures of real-life blackbirders Bully Hayes and Ben Pease. The character of Hayes was much softened in the film and Pease turned into a villain. The script was rewritten by John Hughes.

The director was Ferdinand Fairfax, an Englishman most recently notable for his direction of the television series, Churchill — The Wilderness Years. Fairfax described the film as a tongue-in-cheek adventure in the style of Butch Cassidy and the Sundance Kid. "I'm not making Carry on Pirates or anything like that, but I think it will be a very funny film", he said.

The film was entirely financed with New Zealand money but achieved distribution in the US. Producer Phillips raised money in part on the back of the success of his short film, Dollar Bottom.

The film was shot in Fiji, Rotorua and Urupukapuka Island. At Urupukapuka, the producers built a set reconstructing the Port of Samoa.

== Release and reception ==
The film has a cult following which seems to have encouraged the release of the film on Region 1 and Region 2 DVD, in June and November 2006 respectively.

=== Reception ===
In his review, Roger Ebert gave the film one star and called it 'inexplicable', criticizing the tone and plot. The New York Times gave plaudits to the performances, but felt the film was 'no fun at all', criticizing the inconsistent action and production values.

Colin Greenland reviewed Savage Islands for Imagine magazine, and stated that "Savage Islands doesn't have quite the pace or panache of Raiders of the Lost Ark, but it is first-class nonsense."

Audiences polled by CinemaScore gave the film an average grade of "B-" on an A+ to F scale.

== Legacy ==
Sir Richard Taylor of Weta Workshop said Savage Islands kick-started the New Zealand filmmaking boom of the 1980s.

Savage Islands inspired Lawrence Watt-Evans to write the 1992 novella The Final Folly of Captain Dancy.
