= Ben Pease =

American slave trader (c.1834–1870)

- Born: c. 1834; Edgartown, Massachusetts
- Died: 1870; The suspicion is that Bully Hayes disposed of Pease during a voyage to the Caroline Islands and Marshall Islands
- Occupations: Ship's Captain; Trader; Blackbirder
- Parent(s): Henry A. and Mary A. (Fisher) Pease

Ben Pease (c. 1834–1870) or Benjamin Pease, was a notorious blackbirder, engaged in recruiting and kidnapping Pacific Islanders to provide labor for the plantations of Fiji.

Pease was born in about 1834 in Edgartown, Massachusetts. He was youngest of seven children of Henry A. and Mary A. (Fisher) Pease. Pease was a ship's captain operating in the Pacific during the 1850s and 1860s. His elder brother was Captain Henry A. Pease Jr., (1824–1892), who became a whaling ship master and was involved in the whaling disaster of 1871 and was later the U. S. Consul to Santiago, Cape Verde (1882–1892).

== Life ==
Pease was described as "a satanic looking rascal with a black spade beard – [who] was a more openly piratical operator than [Bully] Hayes". Pease may have greater claim than Bully Hayes as being a South Sea pirate and "the last of the buccaneers," as Pease appears to have been engaged in filibustering in his activities in the opium trade after China's defeat in the Second Opium War in 1858, when it was forced to legalize opium and allow the importation of opium. However details of Pease's involvement in this trade is uncertain. There are stories told that he was a captain of a gunboat in the Imperial Chinese Navy; and that he was engaged in action against pirates along the coast of China; as well there are stories of Pease raiding trading junks along the coast of China.

On 5 July 1865 Pease received the first license to providing 40 laborers from the New Hebrides to Fiji. Alfred Restieaux, an island trader who had dealings with both Hayes and Pease writes that in late in 1866 or early 1867, Pease was introduced to Mr. C. A. Williams, a ship owner of New London, Connecticut who bought a schooner that he renamed the Blossom. As captain of the Blossom, Pease traded in the Marshall Islands.

Pease purchased the Water Lily, a 250-ton brig that was built for the opium trade into China, and later fitted it out to engage in the blackbirding trade in the Pacific. While there was some voluntary recruitment of Pacific Islanders, the activities of blackbirders predominantly involved kidnapping, coercion and tricks to entice islanders onto ships, on which they were held prisoner until delivered to their destination. In 1868, while the Water Lily was in Manila in the Philippines being repaired, he renamed it the Pioneer.

== Ben Pease & Bully Hayes ==
In 1870, Pease assisted in Bully Hayes' escape after he was arrested in Apia, Samoa on charges of piracy, arising from his blackbirding activities. The accounts of the adventures of Hayes and Pease differ in detail, but what is consistent between the accounts is that Hayes escaped from Samoa on 1 April 1870 aboard the Pioneer. Hayes and Pease proceeded on a trading cruise in the Caroline Islands and the Marshall Islands. According to Alfred Restieaux, Hayes and Pease argued over the ownership of the cargo: Hayes claimed the cargo was his and that Pease was merely carrying it as freight, while Pease claimed a half share in the cargo. The cargo was sold in Shanghai; what happened to Pease is uncertain, except that he never returned to Apia. Restieaux recounts the two stories that he had been told: the first was that Pease drowned after jumping overboard from a Spanish man-of-war, the second, that he was killed in a fight in the Bonin Islands. In any event, when the Pioneer arrived back to port, Hayes was in sole command. His explanation for this change was that Pease had sold him the ship and had retired to China – an explanation that many doubted, but would not or could not challenge.

Hayes renamed the ship the Leonora, and it later was wrecked in a storm while in Lelu Harbor, in what is now the Utwe-Walong Marine Park on Kosrae.

== Bibliography ==
- Daily Mirror (Sydney, Australia) 23 June 1858
- B. Lubbock, Bully Hayes, South Sea Pirate (London 1931)
- A. T. Saunders, Bully Hayes (Perth 1932)
- James A. Michener & A. Grove Day, Bully Hayes, South Sea Buccaneer in Rascals in Paradise, (London: Secker & Warburg 1957)
- F. Clune, Captain Bully Hayes (Sydney 1970)

== Popular culture ==
- The 1983 film Savage Islands, (also known as Nate and Hayes), is an adventure film, which starred Australian actor Max Phipps as the main antagonist in a fictional portrayal of Pease.
- In the TV show Eyes of Wakanda, Season 1 Episode 4, Wakandan agent Kuda mentions that he was responsible for Ben Pease's death.
