= HMS Megaera (1849) =

Frigate of the Royal Navy

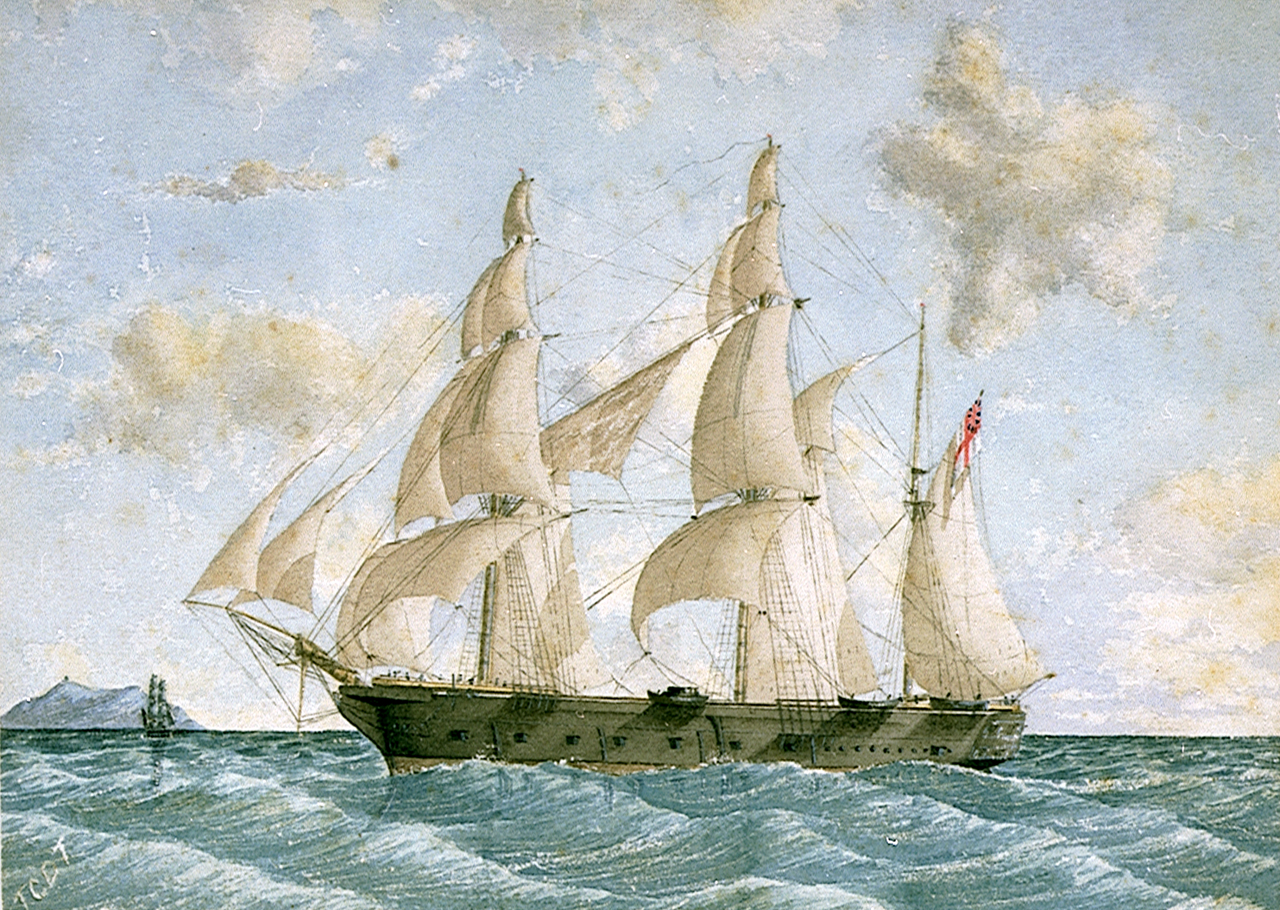
- HMS Megaera in 1869

History

United Kingdom
- Name: HMS Megaera
- Builder: William Fairbairn, Millwall
- Launched: 22 May 1849
- Fate: Wrecked 16 June 1871

General characteristics
- Class & type: Frigate
- Displacement: 2,025 long tons (2,057 t)
- Length: 207 ft (63 m)
- Beam: 37 ft 8 in (11.48 m)
- Draught: 26 ft 3 in (8.00 m)
- Propulsion: Seawards engine; 1 × screw

HMS Megaera was originally constructed as an iron screw frigate for the Royal Navy, and was one of the last and largest ships built by William Fairbairn's Millwall shipyard.

Launched on 22 May 1849, HMS Megaera was one of the first iron ships ordered by the Royal Navy. She was named after the mythological figure Megaera, one of the Erinyes (or Furies, in Roman mythology).

Megaera never saw service as a frigate; just as she entered service, a series of experiments showed that the iron then used in shipbuilding exhibited splintering characteristics which rendered unprotected ships of her type unsuitable for use as warships. The Royal Navy opted to remove the armament from Megaera and her four sister ships and instead employ them as storeships and transports. However, Megaera and her sister ships were not well suited to their new role. Their accommodation was unsuited to carrying large numbers of personnel and their steaming power was poor.

On her maiden voyage as a troopship on 7 June 1851, she broke down and had to be towed back to port. Megaera was refitted and sailed again, ordered to use her sails to conserve coal. She subsequently saw service as a storeship in the Crimea, and some of her crew saw action in a shore landing-party. Following the end of the war in 1856 she resumed routine voyages with stores and replacement personnel for military and naval units.

Following a change in military strategy the Megaera evacuated a small detachment of 21 Royal Artillery Soldiers from the Island of St Vincent on 10 May 1853 landing them at Barbados 2 days later.

== Final voyage ==
In 1871, Megaera was assigned to transport Royal Navy recruits to Australia to replace crewmembers on Blanche and Rosario and departed from England on 22 February 1871. She suffered damage in a storm and put in at Queenstown, Ireland, for repairs. The ship's officers complained that the vessel was overloaded with baggage and riding too low in the water; there was an article in The Times, questions were asked in the House of Commons and eventually an inspection resulted in 127 tons of cargo being removed.

On 28 May, Megaera departed Simonstown, South Africa. Aboard her were 42 officers, 180 sailors, and 67 recruits en route to Australia. On 8 June, a leak was reported in the ship's hold, and for some days was managed using hand-pumps and bailing. Around 14 June it became more serious, and the water began to gain on the pumps. The steam pumps were then brought into play, and they managed to keep the inflow in check. On 15 June Captain Thrupp decided to steer for the nearest land, the uninhabited Saint Paul Island, where he could anchor and examine the hull.

=== Saint Paul Island ===
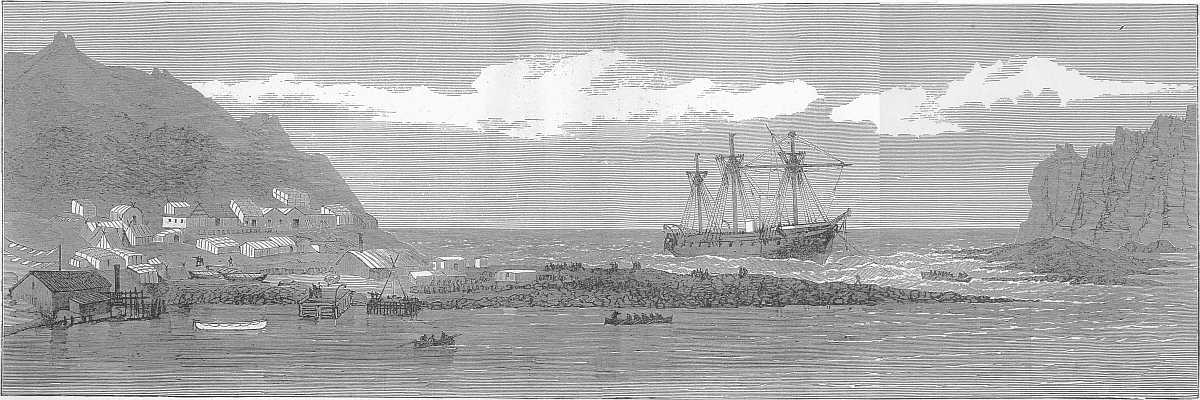
Megaera at Saint Paul Island before beaching, from the Illustrated London News

On 17 June 1871, the ship anchored at Saint Paul in 84 ft (26 m) of water so that the leak could be examined, and a diver was sent to inspect the damage. However, the anchor cable broke and they were obliged to take the diver back on board before he could carry out any work. After she snapped a second anchor cable, Megaera's divers were finally able to make an inspection and the leak was found: one of her iron plates was worn away, and had a hole whose edges were so thin they could be bent by hand. In addition, many of the ship's beams were corroded through at the bottom, and others nearly so.

As Thrupp stated in his later despatch concerning the wreck, the ship's girders were separating from the bottom, the bottom was leaky in one place and very thin in many others, and the pumps were continually becoming choked with thick pieces of iron. The chief engineer of the Megaera, George Mills, advised Thrupp on 17 June that it would be most unsafe to proceed with the voyage to Australia, the nearest point of which was 1,800 mi (2,900 km) away, and his advice was backed up by two other ship's engineers on board, Edward Brown of HMS Blanche, and J.B. Richards of HMS Rosario.

Since the weather was very stormy, and the anchorage could not be depended on, Thrupp announced to the ship's company on the morning of Sunday, 18 June, after reading prayers, that they would land at once. The following day, due to the stormy weather, which had halted the landing of stores, and the difficulty in keeping the ship in position (she had had three anchors carried away and lost since first anchoring), it was decided to beach her. Thrupp had Megaera run onto a bar at full speed, in a depth of 10 ft (3.0 m) of water forward and 18 ft (5.5 m) aft, and at high water she filled up to the level of the main deck. Her provisions and stores were put ashore over the following week, and she was not finally abandoned for 11 days, when Captain Thrupp declared the dangerous wreckage to be off-limits. Two-thirds of the cargo had by then been unloaded.

=== Rescue ===
On 16 July, Captain Visier of the Dutch vessel Aurora spotted the flagpole which Megaera's crew had erected and Lieutenant Lewis Jones sailed with her to Surabaya, Java, which they reached on 2 August. He despatched telegrams to the British Consul in Batavia and to the Royal Navy Commodore in Hong Kong, who ordered HMS Rinaldo to sail to the rescue.

On 7 August, a second Dutch ship took five men from Saint Paul Island, and on the same day the captain of the British clipper Mountain Laurel asked to be paid to rescue the crew of Megaera, claiming that he would have to jettison his cargo to accommodate so many people. Captain Thrupp declined this offer and on 26 August Lieutenant Jones arrived on the British merchant steamship Oberon with supplies. On 29 August, the Dutch vessel Malacca arrived and took off the remaining survivors of the shipwreck, which she conveyed to Sydney. The Rinaldo was blown off the island, and so played no route in the rescue. En route to Australia the Malacca encountered a homeward-bound mail steamer, which Captain Thrupp transferred to.

=== Aftermath ===
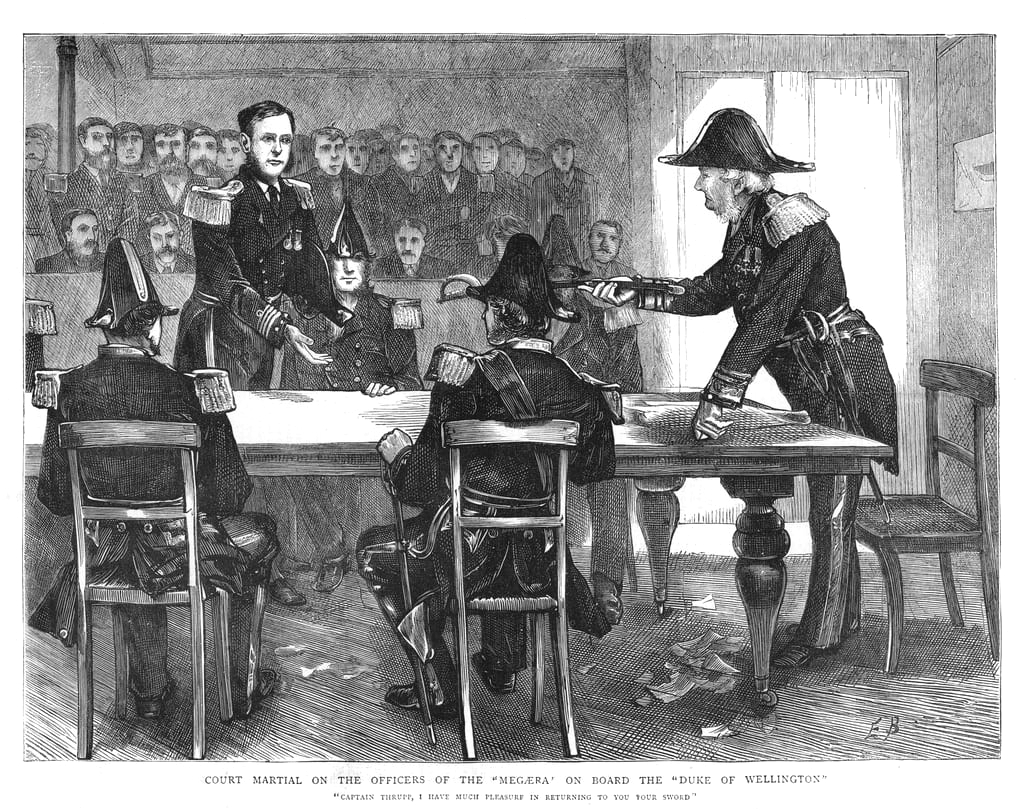
Court Martial on the Officers of the Megaera on board the Duke of Wellington, Captain Thrupp, I have much Pleasure in returning to you your sword. The Graphic 1871

Captain Thrupp and his crew subsequently faced a court martial in November 1871 at Plymouth and a Royal Commission, chaired by Lord Lawrence was appointed to inquire into the loss of the ship. Thrupp was subsequently honourably acquitted when the court decided that the beaching of the ship was perfectly justifiable.
