= HMS Rosario (1860) =

Sloop of the Royal Navy

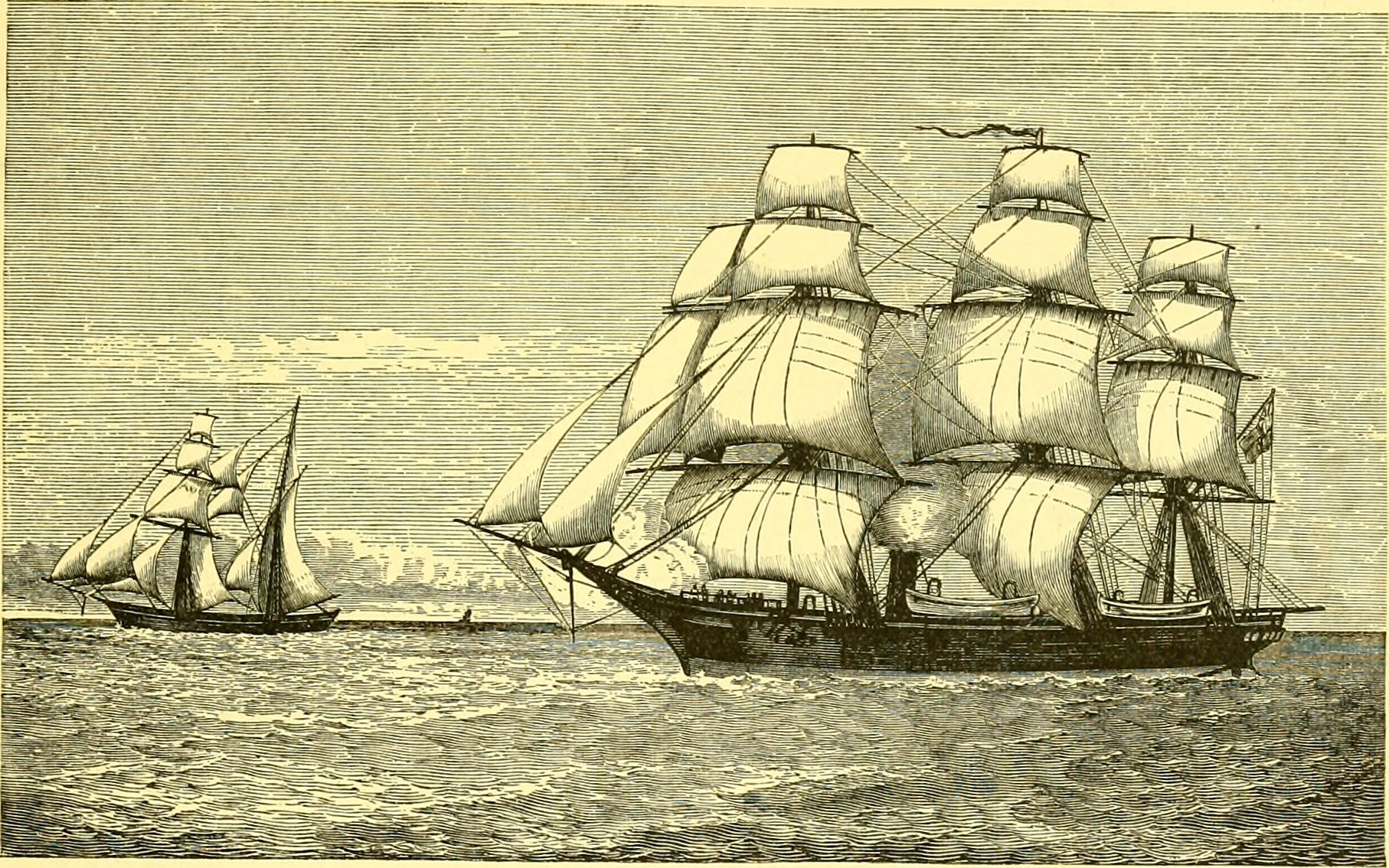
- Rosario chasing a man-stealing schooner in Polynesian waters, c. 1871

History

United Kingdom
- Name: HMS Rosario
- Ordered: 1 April 1857
- Builder: Deptford Dockyard
- Laid down: 13 June 1859
- Launched: 17 October 1860
- Commissioned: 20 June 1862
- Fate: Sold for breaking on 31 January 1884

General characteristics
- Class & type: Rosario-class sloop
- Displacement: 913 tons
- Length: 160 ft 10 in (49.02 m)
- Beam: 30 ft 6 in (9.30 m)
- Draught: 15 ft 10 in (4.83 m)
- Installed power: 436 indicated horsepower
- Propulsion: 2-cylinder horizontal single-expansion steam engine; Single screw
- Sail plan: As built: Ship-rigged; From c.1869: Barge-rigged
- Speed: 9.2 kn (17.0 km/h) under power
- Complement: 140
- Armament: As built: 11 guns: 1 × 40-pdr Armstrong breech loaders; 6 × 32-pdr muzzle-loading smooth-bore guns; 4 × 20-pdr Armstrong breech loaders; By 1869: 3 guns; 1 × 7-inch 7.5-ton muzzle-loading gun; 2 × 40-pdr Armstrong breech loaders

HMS Rosario was an 11-gun Rosario-class screw sloop of the Royal Navy, launched in 1860 at Deptford Dockyard. She served two commissions, including eight years on the Australia Station during which she fought to reduce illegal kidnappings of South Sea Islanders for the Queensland labour market. She was decommissioned in 1875, finally being sold for breaking nine years later. A team from Rosario played the first ever New Zealand International Rugby Union match against a Wellington side in 1870. She was the fifth Royal Navy ship to bear the name, which was first used for the galleon Del Rosario, captured from the Spanish in 1588.

== Design ==
The Rosario class was designed in 1858 by Issac Watts, the Director of Naval Construction. They were built of wood, were rated for 11 guns and were built with a full ship rig of sails (this was reduced to a barque rig by about 1869). With a length overall of 160 feet (49 m) and a beam of 30 feet 4 inches (9.25 m), they had a displacement of 913 tons. These were the last sloops constructed for the Royal Navy to retain all-wooden construction; their successors, the Amazon class, incorporated iron cross beams.

=== Propulsion ===
Rosario was fitted with a Greenock Foundry Company two-cylinder horizontal single-expansion steam engine driving a single screw. With an indicated horsepower of 436 horsepower (325 kW) she was capable of 9.2 knots (17.0 km/h) under steam.

=== Armament ===
As designed, ships of the class carried a single slide-mounted 40-pounder Armstrong breech-loading gun, six 32-pounder muzzle-loading smooth-bore guns and four pivot-mounted 20-pounder Armstrong breech loaders. By 1869 the armament had been reduced to a single 7-inch (180 mm) muzzle-loading gun and two 40-pounders.

=== Construction ===
Rosario was ordered from Deptford Dockyard on 1 April 1857 and laid down on 13 June 1859. She was the first of her class to be launched, on 17 October 1860 and she was commissioned under Commander James Stanley Graham on 20 June 1862.

== History ==
=== First commission (1862–1866) ===
From June to October 1862 she was employed in fishery protection duties in the North Sea. In October, she was transferred to the North America and West Indies Station, and cases of fever and smallpox were recorded in her in 1864 after visits to Kingston, Jamaica and Fort Monroe in Virginia. The strained relationship between the Union and Britain during the American Civil War did not prevent visits to American ports, but ships of the North America Station would also have used Bermuda and the Royal Naval Dockyard, Halifax as bases. The Lyons–Seward Treaty of 1862 allowed for greater co-operation between the US Navy and the Royal Navy in combating slavery, and it is probable that anti-slavery formed part of her employment, particularly in the Caribbean.

In 1866, she was ordered from Quebec to Montreal to provide protection to the harbour during the Fenian Raid of 1866. Sixteen members of her ship's company were awarded the "Fenian Raid 1866" clasp to the Canada General Service Medal 1866-70, possibly while serving as members of a Naval Brigade.

After four years on the North America and West Indies Station she paid off at Chatham on 13 October 1866.

=== Second commission (1867–1875) ===
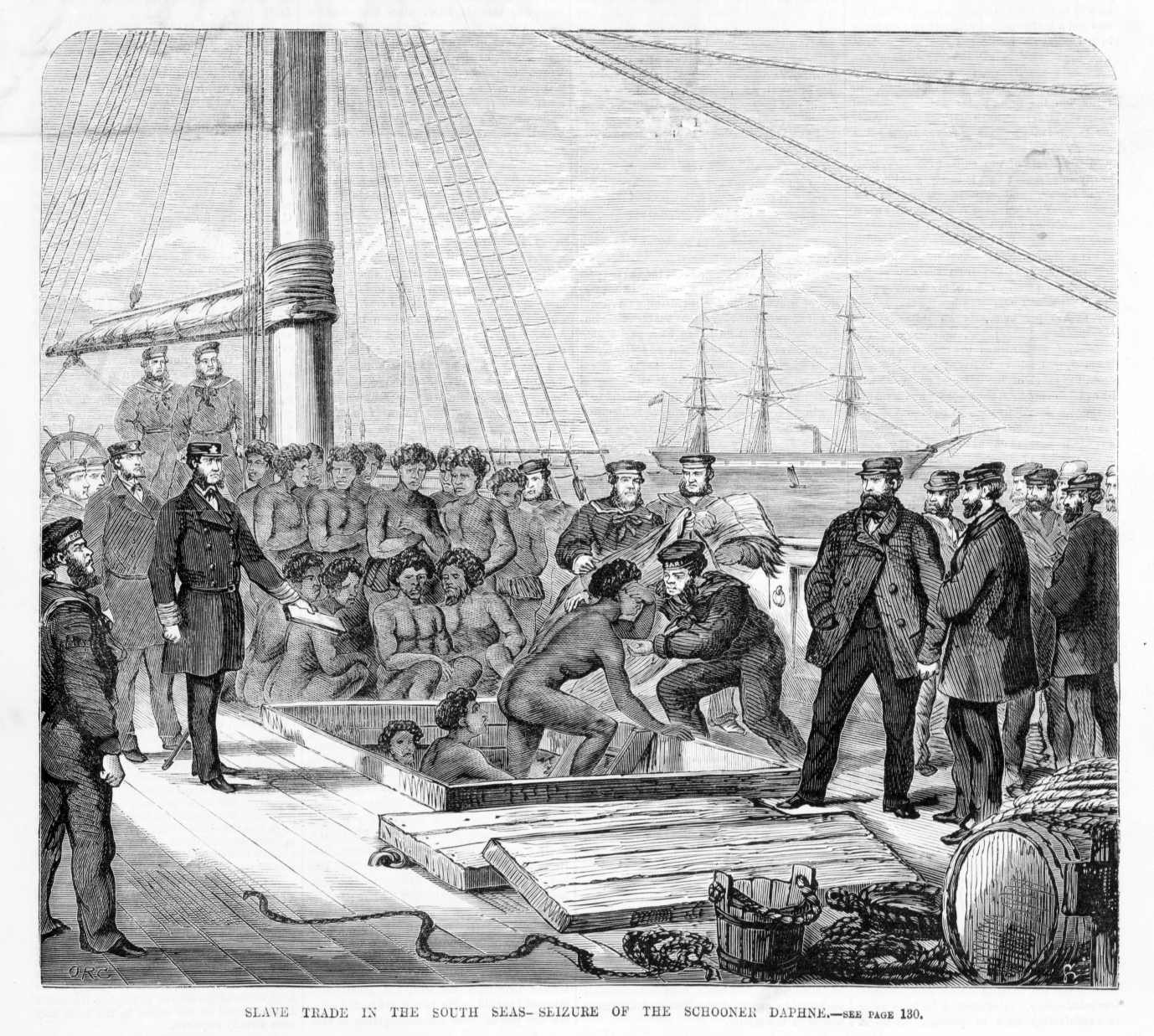
The seizure of the blackbirding schooner Daphne

Rosario recommissioned at Woolwich on 28 September 1867 under her previous captain, Commander Louis Venturne. Commander George Palmer then took command in October 1867 and under him she sailed for the Australia Station.

On 4 June 1868, officers from HMS Rosario were entertained in Auckland, New Zealand by the Officers of the Royal Irish Regiment (the 18th). On 5 June the ship left Auckland for Tauranga, with the Governor of New Zealand, Sir George F. Bowen on board.

In 1869 Rosario detained the schooner Daphne on suspicion of "blackbirding", or the illegal recruitment (including enslavement) of the indigenous populations of nearby Pacific islands or northern Queensland. Commander Palmer brought charges at the Vice Admiralty Court of New South Wales, but the charges were dismissed by the Chief Justice of New South Wales, Sir Alfred Stephen, on the grounds that the 'passengers' could not be proven to be slaves - a stance strengthened by the court's refusal to hear testimony from the kidnapped islanders before the court, on the assumption that they would not understand the meaning of a Christian oath and thus be incompetent to testify.

In 1870 a team from Rosario played the first New Zealand International Rugby Union match against a side from Wellington.

It was intended to recommission her in Sydney in 1871, with a new crew being brought out from England in HMS Megaera, but with Commander Challis remaining in command. In the event Megaera became a total loss at the isolated St Paul Island, and the crews were rescued by HMS Rinaldo and SS Malacca. There were no fatalities, and the new crews eventually reached their intended ships.

Albert Hastings Markham became acting commander of Rosario between 12 October 1871 and 12 February 1872, during the first cruise to the New Hebrides for the suppression of the South Seas labour trade. He published an account of the cruise under the title The cruise of the Rosario amongst the New Hebrides and Santa Cruz Islands, exposing the recent atrocities connected with the kidnapping of natives in the South Seas. The cruise included a visit to the island of Nukapu to inquire into the murder of Bishop Patteson, but little of value was found until they came to the south-east side of the Island, where the bishop had been killed. In the words of the contemporary newspaper report:

The Rosario's boat had got to within 50 yards of the mainland when the natives commenced their war dance and made other hostile indications. They then sent a shower of arrows at the Rosario's boat, which however, all fell short. The boat then returned to the ship to report the attack, and to ask permission to return it. The boat was ordered to return, and the ship was cleared for action, and opened fire with shell from the 40-pounder Armstrong, and the 7in. six and a half ton gun; while the crew of the boat opened fire with their rifles. The Rosario made a circuit of the island, and when abreast of the native village fired on it with shell at 2,300 yards. At 4 p.m., it being high water, the boats were able to cross the reef, and four of them advanced on the village with small arms, and engaged the natives, who kept up a continual discharge of arrows; the ship sent in shell at a range of a mile. After firing several hundred rounds, the men landed from the boats and drove the natives in from the beach. Here one of the arrows struck Corporal Marcus in the arm, and the wound afterwards proved fatal. The native canoes were destroyed, and the seamen pulled on to the village, where one of them received two bad wounds, but ultimately recovered from their effects. The village proved to be very strongly fortified with stonework, which was thrown up in front of each hut. In a few minutes the native habitations were set in flames. It was estimated that from 20 to 30 natives were killed in the engagement.

— The Rosario and the Murderers of Bishop Patteson, reported in The Argus

The ill feeling against white men in Nukapu is easily understood; one of the vessels stopped by Rosario during the November 1871 cruise was the brig Carl, which had been the scene of a particularly brutal massacre. Markham was too late to find any evidence of the murder of up to 50 islanders on board (that came later when one of the crew turned King's evidence), but the activities of the ship in the area explain the aggressive attacks of the local population, and probably also explain the murder of the bishop. The measures taken by Rosario became the subject of questions in the House of Commons, and Markham's book on the subject may well have been prompted by them. The book itself makes clear that Markham clearly understood the cycle of violence and deplored both the murderous activities of the Blackbirders, and the apparent need for further violence in restoring order.

In April 1872, once again under Commander Challis, she visited Wellington, Otago and Auckland in New Zealand. Her cruise of the later part of the year took her to the Solomon Islands, and was conducted entirely under canvas. After refitting in Sydney, she left on 9 February 1873 to Wellington, Auckland and Picton in New Zealand, returning to Sydney on 18 September 1873. At the end of October, Rosario sailed to Fiji, the Solomon Islands and New Britain, returning freed workers and including the investigation of murders at Port Praslin (New Ireland), arriving back at Sydney on 16 February 1874.

On 13 March 1874, Commander Arthur Edward Dupuis took command and from then until 20 July visited Fiji and Samoa, and from 21 July Rosario sailed on to the Marshall Islands, the Ellice Islands and the Gilbert Islands, collecting evidence and searching for William "Bully" Hayes, who was notorious for his blackbirding activities. Rosario picked up a number of his shipwrecked crew from Kosrae. Hayes was found and questioned by Commander Dupuis, but escaped before being arrested. In the words of a Petty Officer on board:

Arrived Strong's Island on 25th Sept and on approaching the harbour a boat was seen making for the ship and soon the figure of a stranger was seen on the Quarter deck and no other than the veritable Capt Hayes, here was the outlaw on a man-of-wars deck with a bold front on him, offering to pilot the ship in. On being questioned by the Capt. (Commander Dupuis), he informed him that his vessel was wrecked near here and he had established a station making oil. The Rev. Snow had also arrived from Ebon. There was also a trading vessel from Sydney. A Court of Enquiry was held next day and Hayes' crew were each separately examined and their evidence noted down. Hayes was let go on parole to fetch his papers the next day, but the same evening, late, a boat came from the station to say he had escaped from the island in a small boat taking one man with him – this proved true. The most positive proof of his villainy was in the person of a young female native, a mere child, she was brought on board and subjected to medical examination. This child was still suffering from his treatment although some time had elapsed since the committal of the outrage. Our Capt. had no authority to make him a prisoner but would have taken him from the island if requested by the Missionary and King. The former acting as an American representative, but the delay in acting together ensured the time for flight. The Capt. visited Hayes' station next day and turned everything over to charge of the Mate, a Swede. The women, his mistresses, he forwarded to the King putting them under his protection. These were mostly young females from different islands. The remainder of the crew were received on board for passage to Sydney. Rosario returned to Sydney on 31st October 1874.

His Journal also describes the final activity of the commission:

News came on board that the ship was given to the Adelaide Government as a training ship but a few months would elapse before arrangements could be settled for conveying the crew home. Accordingly, orders were received to proceed to New Zealand to put the time in.

( . . . )

On the 26th February 1875, a telegram was received to take the ship home as the (Adelaide) Government had refused her. Preparations were at once commenced for the Homeward Bound trip and being completed by the 10th April when we bid farewell to Sydney and proceeded out of harbour in tow of our Chummy Ship Blanche.

The 'Homeward Bound' pendant was hoisted, the Yard arms manned with Flags and a Tar at each mast head, quietly distributing the torn fragments of his Colonial love letters, while the band of the Pearl played 'Home Sweet Home' as the little vessel glided slowly from her anchorage. A few well-known faces were seen waving their adieus. On arrival at the Heads, the Blanche cast us off and both ships rigging were manned and hearty cheers rung aloud from each as parting company from our old companions of St Paul's Island.

April 1875: On the evening of the 25th April when off the Three Kings Island near New Zealand, we encountered a terrific squall taking the Ship aback and reducing the Ship to a perfect wreck aloft taking sails and spars and placing the Ship in danger of foundering for some moments. This necessitated putting in to Auckland for repairs which was reached on the 28th. On arrival it was discovered that the rudder was damaged, accordingly a new one was ordered; this caused a delay of nearly 6 weeks when we again started on June 5th for Portsmouth.

June 1875: A fine passage of 39 days brought us off the Horn which was rounded on the morning of the 14th July – the Equator was crossed on the 11th August in company of quite a fleet of vessels and from that date up to the 24th vessels have been daily seen. On the 3rd Sept 1875, when in the latitude of Madeira, got into calms and on the 9th got up steam and steamed for 17 hours. When the boilers gave, we out made sail on the 10th and arrived at Fayal on the 11th, sailing again on the 12th September.

Arrived at Spithead Sept 27th and proceeded for Sheerness the following evening arriving there on the 30th September 1875. Was inspected by Vice-Admiral GF Hastings at 10 a.m. and paid off on the 12th October 1875.

== Fate ==
She is listed at Chatham in 1880, and on 31 January 1884 she was sold to Castle for breaking up at Charlton.
