= Fernando de Noronha Environmental Protection Area =

- Área de Proteção Ambiental Fernando de Noronha - Rocas - São Pedro e São Paulo
- IUCN category V (protected landscape/seascape)
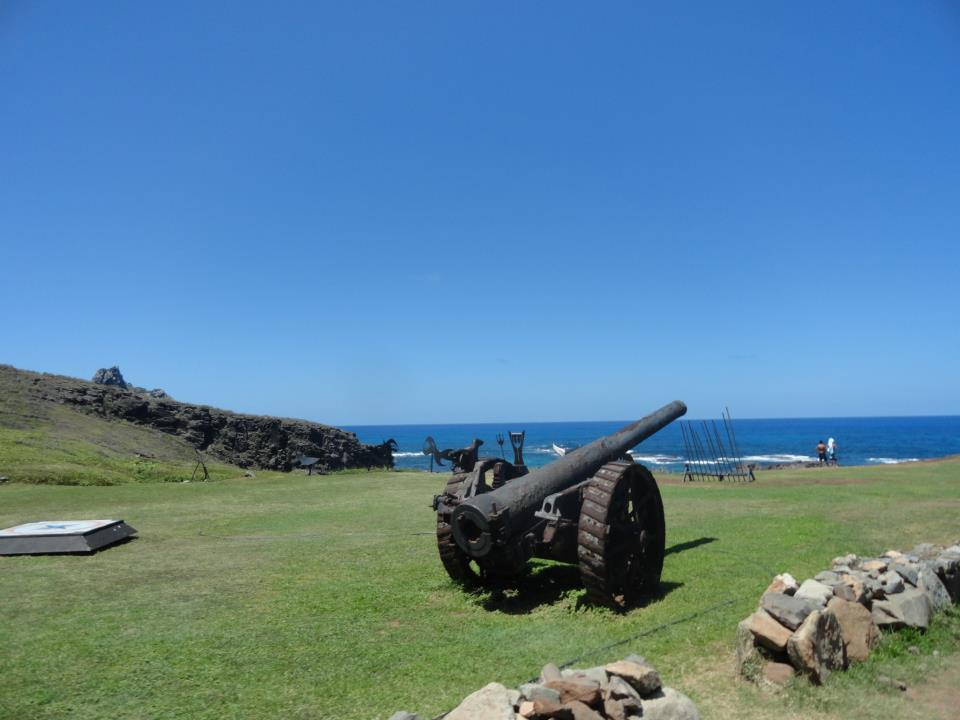
- Cannon, from the old fortifications

- Location within Brazil
- Coordinates: 3.851°S 32.426°W
- Area: 884 hectares (2,180 acres)
- Designation: Environmental Protection Area
- Created: 5 June 1986

Fernando de Noronha Environmental Protection Area (Portuguese: Área de Proteção Ambiental Fernando de Noronha - Rocas - São Pedro e São Paulo) is a protected area on the island of Fernando de Noronha in the Atlantic ocean offshore from Pernambuco state, Brazil.

== Location ==
The protected area, which covers 884 hectares (2,180 acres) of coastal marine land, was established on 5 June 1986. It is administered by the Chico Mendes Institute for Biodiversity Conservation. The reserve is part of the Fernando de Noronha municipality of Pernambuco state. The area covers the urban part of the island of Fernando de Noronha, while the Fernando de Noronha National Park covers the rest. The area includes a large marine extension to the Saint Peter and Saint Paul Archipelago, which is also in the National Park.

== Environment ==
Much of the original vegetation of the island was cut when it was used as a prison, to make it harder for prisoners to hide. After that non-native species, particularly flaxseed, were introduced to feed livestock and have spread uncontrollably. The teju lizard was introduced in an unsuccessful attempt to control an infestation of rats, and the lizard is also a problem. Despite the stated objective of recovery of the environment, sheep continued to be farmed on the island.

== Conservation ==
The reserve is classed as IUCN protected area category V, protected landscape/seascape. The purpose is to conserve the environment, flora and fauna, while recognizing the needs of tourism. Protected species include green sea turtle (Chelonia mydas), the coral Phyllogorgia dilatata and the fish species island hogfish (Bodianus insularis), Anthias salmopunctatus, butterflyfish (Prognathodes obliquus) and Stegastes sanctipauli.

== Sources ==
- APA de Fernando de Noronha - Rocas - São Pedro e São Paulo, Chico Mendes Institute for Biodiversity Conservation, archived from the original on 2015-10-23
- Área de Proteção Ambiental Fernando de Noronha - Rocas - São Pedro e São Paulo (in Portuguese), Parque Nacional Marinho Fernando de Noronha, archived from the original on 2017-01-04
- "Área de Proteção Ambiental de Fernando de Noronha - Rocas - São Pedro e São Paulo", Via Rural (in Portuguese), archived from the original on 2017-01-04
- Unidade de Conservação: Área de Proteção Ambiental de Fernando de Noronha (in Portuguese), MMA: Ministério do Meio Ambiente
