= Frank Thomas Bullen =

British marine novelist

- Born: 5 April 1857; Paddington, London, England
- Died: 1 March 1915 (aged 57); Madeira
- Occupations: seaman, marine novelist
- Known for: Stories of the sea
- Notable work: The Cruise of the Cachalot, see also Novels
- Awards: Fellow, Royal Geographical Society

Frank Thomas Bullen (5 April 1857 – 1 March 1915) was a British marine novelist known for writing over 30 novels about his experiences on the sea.

== Biography ==
Bullen was born of poor parents in Paddington, London on 5 April 1857. He was educated for a few years at a dame school and Westbourne school, Paddington. At the age of 9, his aunt, who was his guardian, died. He then left school and took up work as an errand boy. In 1869 he went to sea and travelled to all parts of the world in various capacities including that of second mate of the Harbinger and chief mate of the Day Dawn, under Capt. John R. H. Ward jun in 1879 when she was dismasted and disabled.

Having spent 15 years of his life at sea, since the age of 12, he later described the hardships of his early life thus:

"I have been beaten by a negro lad as big again as myself, and only a Frenchman interfered on my behalf. Those were the days when boys in Geordie colliers or East Coast fishing smacks were often beaten to insanity and jumped overboard, or were done to death in truly savage fashion, and all that was necessary to account for their non returning was a line in the log to the effect that they had been washed or had fallen overboard."

A parallel may be drawn with Joseph Conrad's career at sea aboard Torrens 1891–1893. He was a clerk in the Meteorological Office from 1883 to 1889. His reputation was made over the publication of The Cruise of the "Cachalot" (1898); and he also wrote, amongst other books, Idylls of the Sea (1899); Sea Wrack (1903); The Call of the Deep (1907) and A Compleat Sea Cook (1912), besides many articles and essays. He lectured extensively and was highly critical of Australasia's lack of defences against what he saw as imminent naval threats from Germany and Japan.

== Death ==
Bullen died at Madeira on 1 March 1915 at the age of 57.

His obituary reads:

"The well-known lecturer, and writer of stirring sea stories, Mr. Frank T. Bullen, who died towards the end of February, was a Fellow of this Society from 1898 until a couple of years ago. A son of Mr. F. R. Bullen, of Crewkerne, Dorset, he led a roving and adventurous life from quite an early age, and many of the most thrilling episodes in his books were records of his own experiences. After various adventures on shore he went to sea in 1869, and for some years roughed it in various capacities in the merchant service, suffering great hardships, as vividly described in The Log of a Sea Waif and other books. He was keenly interested in the bettering the condition and raising the moral tone of our merchant seamen, and many of his books were of a semi-religious character. In his latter years he was known as a successful lecturer and a writer of miscellaneous stories and articles in addition to his books. He had lived for some years at Melbourne, near Cambridge."

== Novels ==
- The Cruise of the Cachalot: Round the World After Sperm Whales, 1898
- The Log of a Sea-Waif, 1899
- Idylls of the Sea, 1899
- The Way They Have In the Navy, 1899
- With Christ At Sea, 1900
- The Men of the Merchant Service, 1900
- Deep Sea Plunderings, 1901
- A Sack of Shakings, 1901
- With Christ in sailor town; what the seamen's mission is doing, 1901
- The Apostles of the South-East, 1901
- A Whaleman's Wife, 1902
- Sea Wrack, 1903
- Denizens of the Deep, 1903-1904
- Sea Puritans, 1904
- Back to Sunny Seas, 1905
- Frank Brown, Sea Apprentice, 1906
- Sea Spray, 1906
- Our Heritage, the Sea, 1906
- The Call of the Deep, 1907
- Advance, Australasia!, 1907
- A Bounty Boy: Being Some Adventures of a Christian Barbarian on an unpremeditated Trip Round the World, 1907
- The Confessions of a Tradesman, 1908
- A Son of the Sea, 1908
- The Seed of the Righteous, 1908
- Creatures of the Sea, 1909
- Beyond, 1909
- The Bitter South 1909
- Cut off from the world, 1909
- The Salvage of a Sailor, 191-?
- Told in the dog watches, 1910
- Young Nemesis; or, The Pirate Hunter, 1910
- Fighting the Icebergs, 1910
- A Compleat Sea Cook, 1912
- Songs of Sea Labour, 1914
- Recollections: the reminiscences of the busy life of one who has played the varied parts of sailor, author & lecturer, 1915
