= Bully Hayes =

19th-century American sailor and blackbirder

William Henry Hayes
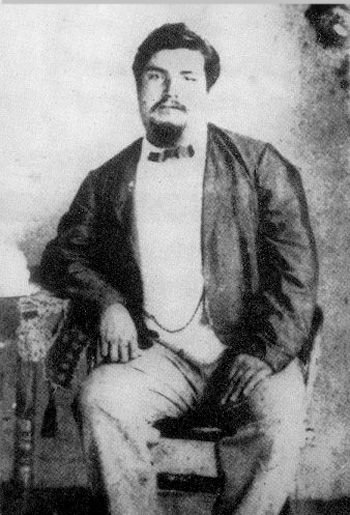
- "Bully" Hayes, c. 1863
- Born: 1827 or 1829; Cleveland, Ohio
- Died: 31 March 1877; In the Pacific Ocean off Kosrae, in the Caroline Islands (now Federated States of Micronesia)
- Other name: Bully Hayes
- Occupations: Ship's captain, trader, and blackbirder

William Henry "Bully" Hayes (1827 or 1829 – 31 March 1877) was a notorious American ship's captain who engaged in blackbirding in the 1860s and 1870s.

Hayes operated across the breadth of the Pacific Ocean from the 1850s until his murder on 31 March 1877. He has been described as a South Sea pirate and "the last of the buccaneers". However, in their account of his life, James A. Michener and A. Grove Day warn that it is almost impossible to separate fact from legend regarding Hayes; they described him as "a cheap swindler, a bully, a minor confidence man, a thief, a ready bigamist", and commented that there is no evidence that he ever took a ship by force in the tradition of a pirate or privateer. Hayes was a large man who used intimidation against his crew, although he could reportedly be very charming if he chose to be.

== Early career ==
He was born in Cleveland, Ohio, one of three sons of Henry Hayes, a grog-shanty keeper. Hayes became a sailor on the Great Lakes after running away from home. He is believed to have left New York as a passenger of the Canton on 4 March 1853, although when the ship reached Singapore on 11 July 1853 it was captained by Hayes, and sold by him there shortly after arrival. Hayes operated in East Asia, carrying out various frauds on ship's chandlers over mortgaging ships, providing forged papers in payment for cargo, and selling cargo for his own account rather than for the account of the owners of the cargo.

== Australia ==
Hayes arrived in Fremantle, Western Australia in January 1857 as captain of the C. W. Bradley, Jr. (which was the Canton, repurchased and renamed). The Bradley had excellent cabin accommodation, and made two trips to Adelaide in March and June 1857 with passengers. The South Australian authorities were not pleased as many of these migrants were convicts with conditional pardons. The Singapore ships chandlers caught up with Hayes in Perth, Australia and forced the sale of his ship, bankrupting him. The Bradley was sold in Adelaide on 22 July and was later renamed Federation.

Hayes married the widow Amelia Littleton in the Clare Valley town of Penwortham on 20 August 1857, bigamously if, as is believed, Hayes had earlier married in the United States.

Hayes had built up debts in Adelaide, but by a ruse escaped his creditors and in Melbourne, Australia he gained the command of the Orestes sailing to Vancouver, Canada. Hayes was thrown off the ship in Honolulu by the supercargo for swindling passengers. He proceeded to gain command of a new ship, the 318-ton brig Ellenita with a cargo obtained by fraud. Hayes sailed back across the Pacific, abandoning Amelia in San Francisco. Another version has her falling from the Orestes in 1858 and drowning. On the return trip to Sydney, Hayes lost the Ellenita off Navigator Islands on 16 October 1859 and with the women and children and a skeleton crew reached Savaiʻi to raise the alarm. After considerable difficulties, the remaining passengers and crew were returned to Sydney by H.M. brig Elk. There Hayes evaded a charge of having indecently assaulted one of the passengers, Miss Cornelia Murray, aged 15.

Although Hayes lost the Ellenita in a storm and others to creditors, he always found new ships to command and new cargoes to fraudulently acquire and sell. Between maritime adventures Hayes became a member of a blackface minstrel troupe in New South Wales, Australia.

== New Zealand ==
Hayes was a notable early figure in the history of the Otago region of New Zealand. After facing bankruptcy in Australia in the late 1850s, he sailed to Otago in 1862 (at the time the region was the centre of a gold rush). He toured the region with a travelling company of vaudeville artists on a tour of New Zealand. In January 1863 they arrived at Arrowtown. Hayes married a widow Mrs Roma 'Rosie' Buckingham, whose four sons were vaudeville artists, performing as The Masters Buckingham. Hayes and Roma settled in Arrowtown where he opened a hotel, the "United States", later called "The Prince of Wales". The nearby Lake Hayes is indirectly named for him; originally called Hay's Lake after an early settler, the spelling changed over the years as locals came to associate the name with that of Bully Hayes.

Hayes had a falling out with the Buckingham family, who offered any barber £5 to cut his hair off short. Eventually this happened and it was revealed, as rumoured, that Hayes had been deprived of an ear in California where he had been caught cheating at cards. After this he was mocked in a popular play and, with his reputation gone, he and his wife left for Port Chalmers. Later he acquired a ship in Australia, the Black Diamond, which he hid in Croixelles Harbour, near Nelson. On 19 August 1864, while travelling in a borrowed yacht, the family was caught by a sudden squall and Rosie, her baby, her brother, and a nurse all drowned. Only Hayes survived.

He moved to Christchurch, where he married Emily Mary Butler in 1865.

== Blackbirding on the Rona, Samoa, and Leonora ==
In May 1866 Hayes acquired the brig Rona and operated in the Pacific with bases in Apia, Samoa, and in Mili Atoll in the Marshall Islands. Hayes became notorious in the Pacific because of his "recruiting" of Pacific islanders to provide labour for the plantations of Tahiti, Fiji, Samoa, and Australia. While there was some voluntary recruitment of Pacific islanders, the activity predominantly involved kidnapping, coercion, and tricks to entice islanders onto ships, on which they were held prisoner until delivered to their destination.

On 17 April 1868, Hayes arrived off Suwarrow on the brig Rona, with 109 islanders from Niue (then known as Savage Island) who were being transported to Tahiti. He found Captain Handley B. Sterndale and a work crew of 18 men, 2 women, and 3 children, whose food supplies had run out. Hayes agreed to rescue Sterndale and the islanders, notwithstanding the Rona was already crowded, with Sterndale and the Islanders being delivered to Rakahanga (Reirson island), from where they eventually travelled to Tahiti. Sterndale sold the pearl shell, beche-de-mer, copra, and equipment to Hayes. Sterndale later discovered that John Lavington Evans (the superintendent of the Pacific Islands Trading Company Limited who had delivered the work crew to Suwarrow), had travelled to Samoa, sold the ship, and departed to Sydney, and concealed that Sterndale and the islanders were on Suwarrow with a limited supply of provisions and no boats capable of leaving the island.

Hayes made money and purchased the brigantine Samoa. By coincidence Hayes lost both ships off Manihiki, Cook Islands in March 1869. Hayes then purchased the schooner Atlantic, although soon after he was arrested in February 1870 by the Consul Williams in Apia on charges related to his activities. Hayes escaped from Samoa on 1 April 1870 on the ship of Ben Pease, a fellow American of similar reputation.

There are differing accounts of the adventures of Hayes and Pease. That of James A. Michener and A. Grove Day Hayes differs in detail from that provided by Alfred Restieaux, an island trader who had dealings with both Hayes and Pease. Consistent between the accounts is that Hayes and Pease proceeded on a trading cruise in the Caroline Islands and the Marshall Islands in the 250-ton brig Pioneer. According to Restieaux, Hayes and Pease argued over the ownership of the cargo; Hayes claimed the cargo was his and that Pease was merely carrying it as freight, while Pease claimed a half share in the cargo. Restieaux's account is that Hayes sold the cargo in Shanghai; with Restieaux recounting two stories that he had been told about Pease's death: the first was that he drowned after jumping overboard from a Spanish Man-of-War, the second was that he was killed in a fight in the Bonin Islands.

In any event, when the Pioneer arrived back in Apia, Hayes was in sole command, with his explanation for this change in command being that Ben Pease had sold the ship to Hayes and had retired to China – an explanation that many doubted but would not or could not challenge.

Hayes renamed the ship Leonora (the name of his favourite daughter), painting her white in an effort to change her reputation. Hayes continued to trade in coconut oil, copra, and blackbirding. Hayes was arrested by Captain Richard Meade of the Narragansett (1859) on 19 February 1872 but was released as Meade could not find witnesses or sufficient proof. Hayes's reputation meant that no crew members would give evidence against him. In 1872 Hayes was engaged in the copra trade, including installing George Winchcombe on Nukufetau in the Ellice islands.

== Accusations of rape and indecent assault ==
Hayes had a long history of charges made against him for the sexual assault of underage females. In 1860 he was brought to court in Sydney for the indecent assault of 15-year-old Cornelia Murray aboard his ship the Ellenita. In 1865 he tried to abduct a 17-year-old girl in New Zealand. However, the most shocking example was the brutal rape of a nine-year-old girl at Kosrae in 1872. In July of that year, Hayes went to the Micronesian island of Pingelap where he extorted the people to load his ship with 6,000 coconuts and to bring him a young girl. His demands were met and he sailed to his residence at the nearby island of Kosrae. Here it was reported through several verified written accounts that Hayes took the girl ashore and violently raped her. After Hayes had finished with her, the girl was taken back to the ship in severe pain, crying with blood running down her legs. She was still not able to walk properly after three months when she was returned to Pingelap. An inquiry by Captain A.E. Dupuis of HMS Rosario on 26 September 1874 medically examined another victim for evidence against Hayes, but he escaped while being further questioned, as described in the next section. Hayes was known to treat other girls in a similar manner while at Kosrae.

== Louis Becke and the wreck of the Leonora ==
In 1874, 19-year old Australian Louis Becke sailed a ketch, the E.A. Williams from Apia, Samoa to Mili Atoll to deliver it to Hayes. Becke then joined the Leonora, as a passenger until it was wrecked on 15 March 1874 during a storm while in Utwe harbour at Kosrae, at what is now the Utwe-Walong Marine Park on Kosrae.

After the wreck, Hayes brawled with the European traders on Kosrae and with his crew, with the islanders being subject to seven months of oppression and violence. Becke chose to stay with the islanders in the village of Leassé. In September of that year Rosario (1860) under Captain Dupuis arrived and Hayes was arrested, but escaped by a 14-foot boat built of timber from the wreck of the Leonora. In the words of a Petty Officer on board Rosario:

Arrived here on 25th Sept and on approaching the harbour, a boat was seen making for the ship and soon the figure of a stranger was seen on the Quarter deck and no other than the veritable Capt. Hayes, here was the outlaw on a man-of-war's deck with a bold front on him offering to pilot the ship in. On being questioned by the Capt. He informed him that his vessel was wrecked near here and he had established a station making oil. The Rev Snow had also arrived from Ebon. . . . A court of enquiry was held next day and Hayes' crew were each separately examined and their evidence noted down. Hayes was let go on parole to fetch his papers the next day, but the same evening, late, a boat came from the station to say he had escaped from the island in a small boat, taking one man with him – this proved true. The most positive proof of his villainy was in the person of a young female native, a mere child, she was brought on board and subjected to medical examination. This child was still suffering from his treatment although some time had elapsed since the committal of the outrage. Our Capt.(Dupuis) had no authority to make him a prisoner but would have taken him from the island if requested by the Missionary and King. The former acting as an American representative, but the delay in acting together ensured the time for flight. The Capt. visited Hayes' station next day and turned everything over to charge of the Mate, a Swede. The women he forwarded to the King putting them under his protection. These were mostly young females from different islands, his mistresses. The remainder of the crew were taken on board for passage to Sydney.

Becke later became an author, and wrote a number of stories of the exploits of Bully Hayes.

== The final voyage on the Lotus ==
Hayes reached Guam. He purchased the schooner Arabia on credit in April 1875 and accepted a commission to help convicts escape from prison. He was arrested and ended up in prison in Manila, Philippines – at the time a colony of Spain. Hayes was eventually freed and landed in San Francisco without funds in early 1876. He persuaded a Mr. and Mrs. Moody to fund the purchase of a schooner the Lotus. Hayes tricked Mr. Moody into going ashore and sailed off with Mrs. Moody still on board. After arriving in Apia, Samoa, on 2 January 1877, the Lotus sailed to Kosrae, the island on which Leonora was wrecked, where Hayes intended to collect coconuts left at the time of the wreck.

== Death ==
The commonly accepted version of the death of Hayes provided by Charles Elson, the mate of the Lotus, was that when leaving Kosrae on 31 March 1877, the ship's cook Peter Radeck, "Dutch Pete", responding to threats from Hayes, killed him. While the events are unclear, it is understood that Hayes was shot with a revolver, struck on the skull with an iron implement, and thrown overboard. Charles Elson and the remaining crew sailed the Lotus to Jaluit in the Marshall Islands and gave an account of the death of Bully Hayes. No one was concerned at his death – indeed Peter Radeck was treated as a hero.

Becke's interpretation of the events was that Charles Elson plotted with the other crew members to murder Hayes. The motive was to remove Hayes and allow Elson and the crew to search for and take the money that Hayes was believed to have buried on Kosrae following the wreck of the Leonora in 1874. The existence of this buried money is part of the myth that surrounds Hayes.

== Legend of Bully Hayes ==
Bully Hayes may not have ever taken a ship by force in the tradition of a pirate or privateer, acts of fraud having been his preferred means of gaining command of a ship; however, if the suspicion that he disposed of Ben Pease to gain command of the Pioneer is true then he may well have been a murderer.

Much of his legend is due to the writing of Louis Becke, who used his time with Hayes in his Pacific stories:

- Louis Becke, A Memory of the Southern Seas (1904);
- Captain 'Bully' Hayes;
- Concerning 'Bully' Hayes; and
- The Wreck of the Leonora: A Memory of 'Bully' Hayes

In some he tells stories of Hayes that are based on first-hand experience, but there may be some fictional elements.

== Bibliography ==
Joan Druett, The Notorious Captain Hayes Sydney: HarperCollins, 2016'

- Sydney Morning Herald, 6 January 1860, largely excerpted from the Honolulu Advertiser and 12 January 1860.

(These accounts were published at the same time Hayes was in Sydney answering a charge of indecent assault)

- Government Gazette (Queensland), 28 August 1875.
- Frank Clune, Captain Bully Hayes (Sydney 1970).
- A. Grove Day, Louis Becke (New York 1966).
- B. Lubbock, Bully Hayes, South Sea Pirate (London 1931).

(A. T. Saunders is scathing in his review of Lubbock's book)

- James A. Michener & A. Grove Day, Bully Hayes, South Sea Buccaneer & Louis Becke, Adventurer and Writer in Rascals in Paradise, (London: Secker & Warburg 1957).
- A. T. Saunders, Bully Hayes (Perth 1932).

== Popular culture ==
- The 1894 novel A Modern Buccaneer, by Thomas Browne writing as "Rolf Boldrewood", is based on the story of Bully Hayes.
- Hayes featured in an episode of the radio series Tales of the Southern Cross
- The 1954 film His Majesty O'Keefe includes Hayes' character as the antagonist.
- The 1983 film Savage Islands, (also known as Nate and Hayes), is an adventure film, which starred Tommy Lee Jones as Hayes.
