= The Cruise of the Cachalot =

The Cruise of the Cachalot is an 1898 semi-autobiographical travel narrative by Frank T. Bullen that depicts a whaling expedition from a seaman's perspective. After its initial publication, the book sold well amongst readers, and was well liked. The work was included on a number of early 20th century primary and secondary school reading lists, and Rudyard Kipling's letters include reference to his having read the work with his children.
