= Slavery in Australia =

Slavery in Australia has existed in various forms from colonisation in 1788 to the present day. British settlement relied heavily on convicts, sent to Australia as punishment for crimes and forced into labour and often leased to private individuals. Many Aboriginal Australians and Torres Strait Islanders were also forced into various forms of slavery and serfdom from colonisation. Some Indigenous Australians experienced forced labour until the late 1970s.

Pacific Islanders (mostly Melanesians) were kidnapped or coerced to come to Australia and work, in a practice known as blackbirding. Labourers were also imported from India and China, and employed in various degrees of unfree labour. Legal protections varied and were sometimes not enforced, particularly with workers who were effectively forced to work for their employers and would often go unpaid.

Australia was held to the Slave Trade Act 1807 and the Slavery Abolition Act 1833, which abolished slavery in the British Empire.

== Types of slavery ==
=== Convicts ===
Many of the convicts transported to the Australian penal colonies were treated similarly to slave labour. William Hill, an officer aboard the Second Fleet, wrote that "the slave traffic is merciful compared with what I have seen in this fleet [...] the more they can withhold from the unhappy wretches, the more provisions they have to

dispose of at a foreign market, and the earlier in the voyage they die, the longer they can draw the deceased's allowance to themselves". Once the convicts arrived in Australia they were subjected to the system of "assigned service", whereby they were leased out to private citizens and placed entirely under their control, often forced to work in chain gangs. The unwillingness of wealthy landowners to give up this cheap source of labour was a key factor in why penal transportation persisted for so long, especially in Van Diemen's Land where "assigned service" continued to be widespread until the 1850s.

=== Coolies ===
With the ceasing of convict transportation to New South Wales becoming imminent by the late 1830s, colonists required a substitute cheap form of labour. In 1837 a Committee on Immigration identified the possibility of importing coolie labourers from India and China as a solution. John Mackay, an owner of indigo plantations in Bengal and a distillery in Sydney, organised the import of 42 coolies from India who arrived on 24 December 1837 on board Peter Proctor. This was the first sizeable transport of coolie labour into Australia and Mackay leased most of them out as shepherds to work at John Lord's Underbank land-holding just north of Dungog. The contracts included a 5 or 6-year term of indenture with food, clothing, pay and shelter to be provided, but many absconded, due to reasons of these conditions not being met. The coolies were also subject to assault, slavery, and kidnap.

Government enquiries delayed further coolie importation, but in 1842 a number of colonists, including William Wentworth and Gordon Sandeman, formed an association to pressure the colonial government into allowing further intakes. The association declared that should this be permitted, they would be prepared to adopt principles which Secretary of State for War and the Colonies Edward Stanley had put forth "framed with a view to secure the protection" of the labourers. They wrote that coolies had "exhibited a remarkable standard of honesty, sobriety, and thrift – the latter being strongly exemplified in the sums which many of them have deposited in the Savings Bank, during a few years service." They argued that the practice would be mutually beneficial, positing that wages in New South Wales were "so much superior" to those in India.

The following year, Major G. F. Davidson imported 30 Indian coolies into Melbourne, and in 1844 Sandeman and Phillip Freil organised a shipment of 30 Indian coolies, most of whom were sent to work on their properties in the Lockyer Valley. Wentworth and Robert Towns arranged a shipment of 56 Indian coolies who arrived in a state of starvation in 1846. These coolies went either to labour on Wentworth's pastoral properties such as Burburgate on the Namoi River or worked as servants at his Vaucluse House mansion. Several were imprisoned with sentences of hard labour for absconding. Some were leased out to Helenus Scott's Glendon property in the Hunter Valley – it was alleged that four or five of these died of "a terrible disorder," to which Scott countered that two died of lung inflammation; five were imprisoned after refusing to work on account of not having received summer clothing, cavalierly rejoicing "Gaol–very goot––no work gaol."

Indian coolie transportation was largely discontinued after this but the first shipment of 150 Chinese coolies arrived in Melbourne in 1847 aboard the brig Adelaide and another 31 arrived in Perth a year later. Toward the end of 1848, Nimrod and Phillip Laing brought a further 420 mostly Chinese coolies into the Port Phillip District. Many of these coolies were abandoned, perished in the bush, were jailed, or were found wandering the streets of Melbourne with no food or shelter. Around another 1500 Chinese coolies were shipped into Australia up to the year 1854 with Robert Towns and Gordon Sandeman again being the principal organisers of the trade. A number of scandals occurred that caused a government select committee to be formed to investigate the importation of Asiatic labour. The inquiry found that 70 coolies had died aboard General Palmer during the voyage from Amoy to Sydney and that others had died from sickness once in Australia. There were no berths, bedding, medical, or toilet facilities available on the vessel and a great deal of kidnapping was involved in the recruitment process. The poor conditions on board the vessel Spartan, chartered by Robert Towns, sparked a rebellion of coolies against the crew of the ship. The second-mate and ten of the Chinese were killed before the captain was able to regain control. Out of nearly 250 coolies who had embarked on Spartan, only 180 arrived in Australia. These events together with concurrent disasters in the Chinese coolie trade to Cuba and Peru, ended Asian coolie transportation to Australia by 1855. From 1858, Chinese migration to Australia again spiked due to the gold rushes, but this was mostly voluntary travel.

=== Forced Indigenous labour and stolen wages ===
From the early stages of the British colonisation of Australia right up until the 1960s, Aboriginal Australians and Torres Strait Islanders were used as unpaid labour in many sectors such as the pastoralist industry, beche-de-mer harvesting, pearling, the boiling down industry, marsupial eradication, and prostitution, they were also used as household servants. In return for this labour, the Indigenous people were given portions of inexpensive commodities such as tobacco, rum, slop-clothing, flour and offal. Trade in Aboriginal and Torres Strait Islander children and adolescents was often sought after. Children were often taken from Aboriginal camp-sites after punitive expeditions and they were used as either personal servants or as labour by the colonists who took them. Sometimes these children were taken very far away from their lands and traded to other colonists. For instance, Mary Durack described how one of her relatives in the Kimberley region bought an Aboriginal boy from Queensland for a tin of jam.

In Australia's early years, colonists debated whether the conditions under which Aboriginal and Torres Strait Islander people worked breached laws against slavery in the British Empire. In the pastoralist sector, unpaid labour also allowed Aboriginal people to stay on their land instead of being forced off or massacred.

Anti-slavery campaigners described the conditions of Aboriginal and Torres Strait Islander labour in northern Australia as slavery as far back as the 1860s. In 1891 the British journal Anti-Slavery Reporter published a "Slave Map of Modern Australia".

In Queensland, the Aboriginals Protection and Restriction of the Sale of Opium Act 1897 and successive legislation allowed the Protector of Aborigines to keep wages in funds which were never paid out. From 1897, no person could employ Indigenous labour in that state without the permission of a Protector. The Protector, usually a policeman or government official, had full control of the contract with the employer. Fraud was common, whereby the Protectors would collude with the employers, mostly pastoralists, to underpay or not pay the Aboriginal and Torres Strait Islander workers. Those who refused to work were jailed, threatened with removal or denied access to food. Aboriginal settlements were run as depots for cheap labour where a 20% levy was placed on the inmates' already meagre wages, with the remainder held in a departmental trust account. The money in this account was subject to additional levies, bureaucratic corruption and also appropriated for government spending. The interest earned also went to the government not the wage earner. Aboriginal workers had to get permission from the Protector to make withdrawals and asking questions about their money were often met with the workers being jailed or otherwise punished. This system has been described as "economic slavery" and existed in largely the same format in the state until the mid-1970s.

After Federation in 1901, where Aboriginal labour was legislated as requiring payment in money, these wages were often kept in bank accounts that could not be accessed by them, with the money being redirected elsewhere by government bureaucracies.

Through the 20th century, the British Commonwealth League, the North Australian Workers' Union, anthropologists Ronald and Catherine Berndt, artist Albert Namatjira and others raised concerns about the slave-like conditions under which many Aboriginal people worked.

The Aborigines Act 1911 gave South Australian police powers to “inspect workers and their conditions” but not to enforce change.

On cattle stations in the Northern Territory (NT), Aboriginal workers not only lived in very poor conditions (no built accommodation, having to use water from the cattle trough), but they were given no money, only food. Clothing was lent but had to be returned. The Aboriginals Ordinance 1918 (Cth) allowed the non-payment of wages and forced recruitment of labour in the NT. NT Protector Cecil Cook noted that Australia was in breach of its obligations under the League of Nations Slavery Convention in the 1930s.

When wages started being paid with cash in the 1950s and 1960s, they were still much less (reportedly 15–20%) of white people doing similar work. In 1966 the NT's Wave Hill walk-off, a strike by Gurindji workers led by Vincent Lingiari brought international attention to the injustice of the system, and eventually led to the government mandating equal pay from December 1968. However, at the same time, mechanisation of the stations led to most workers being laid off, and the policy of assimilation meant that the government was placing Aboriginal people on reserves with minimal facilities instead.

Legislation governing and regulating the forced employment of Indigenous Australians continued until the 1970s in some states.

=== Blackbirding ===
The first shipload of 65 Melanesian labourers arrived in Boyd Town on 16 April 1847 on board the Velocity, a vessel under the command of Captain Kirsopp and chartered by Benjamin Boyd. Boyd was a Scottish colonist who wanted cheap labourers to work at his expansive pastoral leaseholds in the colony of New South Wales. He financed two more procurements of South Sea Islanders, 70 of which arrived in Sydney in September 1847, and another 57 in October of that same year. Many of these Islanders soon absconded from their workplaces and were observed starving and destitute on the streets of Sydney. Reports of violence, kidnap and murder used during the recruitment of these labourers surfaced in 1848 with a closed-door enquiry choosing not to take any action against Boyd or Kirsopp. The experiment of exploiting Melanesian labour was discontinued in Australia until Robert Towns recommenced the practice in the early 1860s.

In 1863, Robert Towns wanted to profit from the world-wide cotton shortage due to the American Civil War. He bought a property he named Townsvale on the Logan River and planted 400 acres of cotton. Towns also wanted cheap labour to harvest and prepare the cotton and decided to import Melanesian labour from the Loyalty Islands and the New Hebrides. Captain Grueber together with labour recruiter Henry Ross Lewin aboard the Don Juan, brought 73 South Sea Islanders to the port of Brisbane in August 1863. Towns specifically wanted adolescent males recruited and kidnapping was employed in obtaining these boys. Over the following two years, Towns imported around 400 more Melanesians to Townsvale on one to three year terms of labour. They came on the vessels Uncle Tom and Black Dog. In 1865, Towns obtained large land leases in Far North Queensland and funded the establishment of the port of Townsville. He organised the first importation of South Sea Islander labour to that port in 1866. They came aboard Blue Bell under Captain Edwards. Apart from a small amount of Melanesian labour imported for the beche-de-mer trade around Bowen, Robert Towns was the primary exploiter of blackbirded labour up til 1867.

From 1867, the high demand for very cheap labour in the sugar and pastoral industries of Queensland, led Towns' main labour recruiter, Henry Ross Lewin, and another recruiter by the name of John Crossley opening their services to other land-owners. This resulted in a massive increase in blackbirded labour into Queensland which continued for another approximately 35 years. Traders "recruited" Melanesian or other Kanaka labourers for the sugar cane fields of Queensland, from the New Hebrides (now Vanuatu), Papua New Guinea, the Solomon Islands and the Loyalty Islands of New Caledonia as well as various Micronesian islands such as Kiribati and the Gilbert Islands.

In the late 1860s, these labourers were allegedly sold for as little as £2 each and kidnapping was at least partially used during recruitment, which raised fears of a burgeoning new slave trade. French officials in New Caledonia complained that Crossley had stolen half the inhabitants of a village in Lifou, and in 1868 a scandal evolved when Captain McEachern of the ship Syren anchored in Brisbane with 24 dead islander recruits and reports that the remaining ninety on board were taken by force and deception. Despite the controversy, no action was taken against McEachern or Crossley.

The methods of blackbirding were varied. Some labourers were willing to be taken to Australia to work, while others were tricked or forced. In some cases blackbirding ships (which made huge profits) would entice entire villages by luring them on board for trade or a religious service, and then setting sail. Many died in the fields due to the hard manual labour.

From 1868, the Queensland government tried to regulate the trade: it required every ship engaged in recruiting labourers from the Pacific islands to carry a person approved by the government to ensure that labourers were willingly recruited and not kidnapped. But, such government observers were often corrupted by bonuses paid for labourers 'recruited,' or blinded by alcohol, and did little or nothing to prevent sea-captains from tricking islanders on-board or otherwise engaging in kidnapping with violence. Joe Melvin, an investigative journalist who, undercover, in 1892 joined the crew of Queensland blackbirding ship Helena toward the end of the blackbirding era, found no instances of intimidation or misrepresentation and concluded that the Islanders recruited did so "willingly and cannily". However, the Helena transported Islanders to and from Bundaberg and in this region there was a very large mortality rate of Kanakas in 1892 and 1893. South Sea Islanders made up 50% of all deaths in this period even though they only made up 20% of the total population in the Bundaberg area.

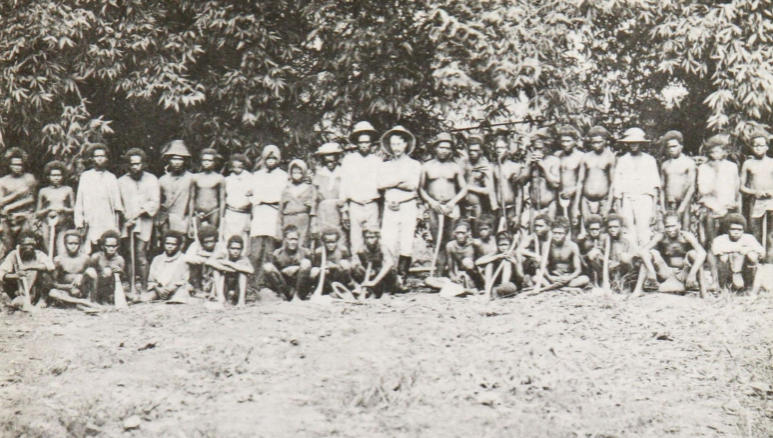
Adolescent South Sea Islanders on a Herbert River plantation in the early 1870s

Recruiting of South Sea Islanders became an established industry during the 1870s with captains of labour vessels being paid about 5 shillings per recruit in "head money" incentives, while the owners of the ships would sell the Kanakas from anywhere between £4 and £20 per head. The Kanakas were sometimes offloaded at the ports in Queensland with metal discs imprinted with a numeral hung around their neck making for easy identification for their buyers. Captain Winship of the Lyttona was accused of kidnapping and importing Kanaka boys aged between 12 and 15 years for the plantations of George Raff at Caboolture. Up to 45 of the Kanakas brought in by Captain John Coath died on plantations around the Mary River. Meanwhile, the famous recruiter Henry Ross Lewin was charged with the rape of a pubescent Islander girl. Despite strong evidence, Lewin was acquitted and the girl was later sold in Brisbane for £20.

The South Sea Islanders were put to work not only in cane-fields along the Queensland coast but were also widely used as shepherds upon the large sheep stations in the interior and as pearl divers in the Torres Strait. They were taken as far west as Hughenden, Normanton and Blackall. When the owners of the properties they were labouring on went bankrupt, the Islanders would often either be abandoned or sold as part of the estate to a new owner. In the Torres Strait, Kanakas were left at isolated pearl fisheries such as the Warrior Reefs for years with little hope of being returned home. In this region, three ships used to procure pearl-shells and beche-de-mer, including the Challenge were owned by James Merriman who held the position of Mayor of Sydney.

Poor conditions at the sugar plantations led to regular outbreaks of disease and death. From 1875 to 1880, at least 443 Kanakas died in the Maryborough region from gastrointestinal and pulmonary disease at a rate 10 times above average. The Yengarie, Yarra Yarra and Irrawarra plantations belonging to Robert Cran were particularly bad. An investigation revealed that the Islanders were overworked, underfed, not provided with medical assistance and that the water supply was a stagnant drainage pond. At the port of Mackay, the labour schooner Isabella arrived with half the Kanakas recruited dying on the voyage from dysentery, while Captain John Mackay (after whom the city of Mackay is named), arrived at Rockhampton in the Flora with a cargo of Kanakas, of which a considerable number were in a dead or dying condition.

Captain William T. Wawn, a famous blackbirder working for the Burns Philp company on the ship Lizzie, freely acknowledged in his memoirs that he took boatloads of young boys with no information given about contracts, pay or the nature of the work. Up to 530 boys were recruited per month from these islands, most of whom were transported to the new large company plantations in Far North Queensland, such as the Victoria Plantation owned by CSR. This phase of the trade was very profitable, with Burns Philp selling each recruit for around £23. Many of them could not speak any English and died on these plantations at a rate of up to 1 in every 5.

Charges of neglect resulting in the death of his Islander labourers were made against Mr Melhuish of the Yeppoon Sugar Plantation. He was placed on trial, but even though he was found responsible, the judge involved imposed only the minimum £5 fine and wished it could be an even lesser amount. When the Yeppoon Sugar Plantation was later put up for sale, the Islander labourers were included as part of the estate. During a riot at the Mackay racetrack, several South Sea Islanders were beaten to death by mounted white men wielding stirrup irons. Only one man, George Goyner, was convicted and received a minor punishment of two months imprisonment.

In 1884, a significant and unique judicial punishment was imposed on the captain and crew of the blackbirding vessel Hopeful. Captain Lewis Shaw and four crew were charged and convicted of various crimes, receiving jail terms of 7 to 10 years, while two others were sentenced to death, later commuted to life imprisonment. Despite evidence showing that at least 38 Islanders had been killed by the Hopeful crew, all the prisoners (except for one who died in jail) were released in 1890 in response to a massive public petition signed by 28,000 Queenslanders. This case sparked a Royal Commission into the recruitment of Islanders from which the Premier of Queensland concluded that it was no better than the African slave trade, and in 1885 a ship was commissioned by the Government of Queensland to return 450 New Guinea Islanders to their homelands. Just like the global slave trade, the plantation owners, instead of being held criminally responsible, were financially compensated by the government for the loss of these workers.

Some 55,000 to 62,500 South Sea Islanders were taken to Australia. The majority of the 10,000 Pacific Islanders remaining in Australia in 1901 were repatriated from 1906 to 1908 under the provisions of the Pacific Island Labourers Act 1901. A 1992 census of South Sea Islanders reported around 10,000 descendants of the blackbirded labourers living in Queensland. Fewer than 3,500 were reported in the 2001 Australian census.

=== Pearling ===
Indigenous Australians, Malaysians, Timorese, and Micronesians were kidnapped and sold as Indentured labour for the pearling industry of north western Australia.

=== Modern slavery ===
According to the Global Slavery Index, there were approximately 15,000 people living in illegal "conditions of modern slavery" in Australia in 2016. During the 2015–16 financial year, 169 alleged human trafficking and slavery offences were referred to the Australian Federal Police (AFP), including alleged instances of forced marriage, sexual exploitation, and forced labour. As of 2017, the Commonwealth Director of Public Prosecutions had prosecuted 19 individuals for slavery-related offences since 2004, with several other prosecutions ongoing.

The introduction of the Modern Slavery Act 2018 into Australian law was partly based upon concerns of slavery being evident in the agricultural sector. The Act also created the office of the Australian Anti-Slavery Commissioner. Former senator Chris Evans was named as the first commissioner and commenced his five-year term on 2 December 2024.

=== Work For the Dole ===
Beginning in 1998, the Australian Government instituted a work program for unemployed welfare recipients. Due to the vulnerability of the participants and low level of agency, combined with the low pay, the policy has increasingly been viewed as slavery by some Australians.

In remote indigenous communities, who are provided with the similar Community Development Program, the perception of slavery is increased, due to perception of government policies creating a lack of alternative opportunity for workers.

=== Corporate modern slavery ===
Following the introduction of Australia's Modern Slavery Act 2018, major Australian retailers began publicly disclosing modern slavery risks within their global supply chains. In July 2019, Target Australia commenced a review of its supply chain after an ABC News investigation linked factories using transferred Uyghurs from China's Xinjiang region to alleged forced labour. The company said it was verifying the origin of its cotton and would act if evidence of forced labour was identified. In their first mandatory modern slavery statements, Woolworths Group identified elevated risks of forced labour among seafood suppliers in Vietnam, cocoa suppliers in Ivory Coast, nut suppliers in Bolivia, and suppliers in Malaysia, where migrant workers from Myanmar were reimbursed recruitment fees following investigations. The Australian Government also introduced procurement measures targeting modern slavery risks in high-risk sectors, including textiles, overseas construction, and cleaning and security services.

In August 2025, the Australian Uyghur Tangritagh Women's Association commenced proceedings in the Federal Court of Australia, alleging that Kmart Australia had engaged in misleading or deceptive conduct by promoting its products as ethically sourced while allegedly sourcing from suppliers linked to Uyghur forced labour in China's Xinjiang region. Kmart denied the allegations, citing its Ethical Sourcing Program. The proceedings renewed debate over the effectiveness of the Modern Slavery Act 2018, particularly its reliance on corporate reporting rather than mandatory human rights due diligence or bans on imports produced through forced labour. During the proceedings in February 2026, Australian Anti-Slavery Commissioner Chris Evans called for stronger modern slavery laws, warning that Australia risked becoming a "dumping ground" for goods produced using forced labour.

== The "History Wars" ==
The assertion that slavery took place in Australia in the British colonial era is often disputed, as part of the ongoing "history wars" about Australia's past. In June 2020, the Australian Prime Minister, Scott Morrison, stated on 2GB radio in Sydney that "Australia when it was founded as a settlement, as New South Wales, was on the basis that there be no slavery ... and while slave ships continued to travel around the world, when Australia was established, yes sure, it was a pretty brutal settlement ... but there was no slavery in Australia". After attracting reproach by Aboriginal and Torres Strait Islander activists along with other sectors of the community, Morrison apologised for any offence caused the following day, and said that he was talking specifically about the colony of New South Wales.

== Colonisation funded by slavery elsewhere ==
In the nineteenth century, there were also many beneficiaries of slavery practised overseas who came to the Australian colonies or who financed settlement of the colonies. Historians have shown that the wealth made from slavery helped finance the British colonisation of Australia, in particular the British colonisation of South Australia and Victoria.

Among others, Lachlan Macquarie, Governor of New South Wales; James Stirling, founding Governor of Western Australia; Edward Eyre Williams, Supreme Court of Victoria judge; and Reverend Robert Allwood, vicar of Sydney's St James' Church and later University of Sydney Vice-Chancellor (1869–1883), were all given wealth and opportunities thanks to money generated by slavery in the British West Indies.

== See also ==
- Master and Servant Acts – Laws regulating the relations between employers and employees
- Australian labour movement
