= Alfred Stephen =

British colonial judge to Van Diemen's Land and New South Wales

Sir Alfred Stephen
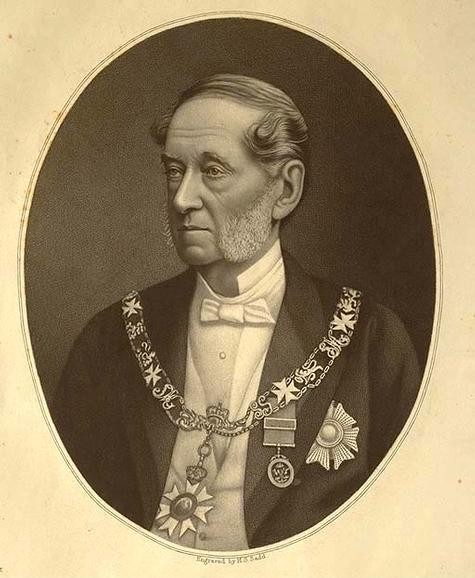
- Sir Alfred Stephen

Chief Justice of New South Wales
- In office 1845–1873
- Preceded by: James Dowling
- Succeeded by: Sir James Martin

Personal details
- Born: 20 August 1802 St Christopher
- Died: 15 October 1894 (aged 92)

Sir Alfred Stephen GCMG CB PC (20 August 1802 – 15 October 1894) was a British colonial solicitor in Van Diemen's Land who was later appointed as Chief Justice of New South Wales. He is mostly remembered for his genocidal attitudes toward Indigenous Australians.

== Early life ==
Alfred was born in 1802 at the British slave colony of St Christopher in the West Indies. The Stephens were a reputable family in the British legal profession and politically well-connected. His father was John Stephen and his uncle was the distinguished James Stephen. He was educated in England and attended Charterhouse School and Honiton grammar school in Devon.

== Van Diemen's Land ==
As a young man he entered the legal fraternity and through his powerful family connections, he was soon appointed to a prominent colonial judicial role. On 24 January 1825 Stephen arrived in Hobart, Van Diemen's Land, and was made Solicitor-General and crown solicitor under Governor George Arthur. Stephen was only 22 years old at the time and was described by his cousin as "not profound in his own profession as a lawyer".

As Solicitor-General of Van Diemen's Land during the late 1820s and early 1830s, Stephen's career intersected with the Black War, the final push by British colonists to destroy the resistance of the Aboriginal Tasmanians. Following an incident where four company servants under the supervision of Alexander Goldie shot one Aboriginal woman and executed another with an axe on 21 August 1829, the case came before Stephens. Despite the proclamation of martial law clearly stating "that defenceless women and children be invariably spared", Stephen ruled that the natives were "open enemies to the King, in a state of actual warfare against him", and thus "the Pursuit of the Natives by Mr Goldie and his party, was lawful".

At a meeting of 400 of Hobart's most notable inhabitants discussing the establishment of a town guard on 22 September 1830, once discussion had turned to the broader question of the object of the operation, Stephens was reported as saying "If you cannot [capture them] … I say boldly and broadly, exterminate!"

== New South Wales ==
In 1839 he moved to New South Wales and became a Supreme Court judge.

In 1869 he also presided over the prominent case brought by Commander George Palmer against Thomas Pritchard and Captain Dagget of the Daphne. Commander Palmer had been sent by the Royal Navy to investigate allegations of blackbirding, the illegal recruitment (including enslavement) of the indigenous populations of nearby Pacific islands or northern Queensland. Palmer found the Daphne in harbour at Levuka in Fiji fitted out like an "African slaver", and filled with Islanders on board looking emaciated and having little knowledge of why they were on the ship. The Daphne was owned by Henry Ross Lewin, a long time blackbirder who had been commissioned to import slaves for Robert Towns' sugar plantations (the entrepreneur after whom Townsville is named). Despite this, Sir Alfred Stephen found Pritchard and Dagget innocent on the grounds that the British Slave Trade Act 1839 did not apply to the South Pacific Ocean. In addition to this, Sir Stephen found that Captain Palmer had illegally seized Daphne and ordered him to pay reparations to Daggett and Pritchard. No evidence or statements were taken from the Islanders. This decision, which overrode the obvious humanitarian actions of a senior officer of the Royal Navy, gave further legitimacy to the blackbirding trade out of Queensland and allowed it to flourish.

== Family ==
Alfred's brother, George Milner Stephen (1812–1894), was a barrister with a significant political career in South Australia and Victoria. Another brother, John Stephen, (died 1854) was the earliest created alderman for the City of Melbourne. Alfred's son Septimus Stephen was a solicitor, NSW politician and in 1870 a co-founder of the Wallaroo Football Club in Sydney, the NSW colony's first rugby union club. Alfred arranged the new club access to the publicly restricted Inner Domain (part of Government House grounds) as a training venue.

== See also ==
- List of judges of the Supreme Court of New South Wales

Legal offices
Preceded by Sir James Dowling	Chief Justice of New South Wales; 1844 – 1873	Succeeded by Sir James Martin
New South Wales Legislative Council
Preceded by Charles Nicholson as Speaker of the unicameral Legislative Council	President of the Legislative Council; 1856 – 1857	Succeeded by John Plunkett
Government offices
Vacant Title last held by Sir Maurice O'Connell	Lieutenant-Governor of New South Wales; 1872 – 1891	Succeeded by Sir Frederick Darley
New title	President of the Board of Trustees of the Art Gallery of New South Wales; 1874 – 1889	Succeeded by Eliezer Levi Montefiore
