= Henry Ross Lewin =

Henry Ross Lewin or Henry Ross-Lewin (c. 1830 – April 1874) was one of the most prominent blackbirders of South Sea Islander labour in the 19th century. He worked with Robert Towns in the early 1860s to establish this labour trade in the British colony of Queensland. He later worked as an independent recruiter of Islander labour for himself and other capitalists. Ross-Lewin also formed a plantation on the island of Tanna where he was killed in 1874.

== Early life ==
Ross-Lewin's exact background is not fully known. It appears he was born around 1830 in the United Kingdom and joined the British Navy when he was a teenager. He served in the China Squadron, but was discharged for behavioural reasons probably in the late 1840s. It appears he came to Australia around 1851, possibly in association with the Chinese coolie trade as he was a passenger on the Duke of Roxburgh bringing people from Amoy to Sydney. In 1851, he was employed as a sailor on the Black Squall which was a coastal trader between Sydney, Hobart and Melbourne.

== New Hebrides ==
At some stage during the 1850s, Ross-Lewin became involved in the Pacific Island trade. He established himself in the New Hebrides and worked for Robert Towns and others to supply sandalwood from these islands for the Chinese markets. He was associated with Captain Edward Rodd at Aneityum in the late 1850s. Captain Rodd was a veteran sandalwood trader who had lost an eye and a hand in skirmishes with Indigenous people of New Caledonia. In the early 1860s, Ross-Lewin brought South Sea Islanders to Sydney on the missionary vessel, John Williams. During this period, Ross-Lewin was mostly based on the island of Tanna in the New Hebrides. He later established a plantation there called Sangalie, which is now known as the Lenakel settlement, the largest town on Tanna. He utilised the Tannese tribe that lived around his plantation to make forced incursions into other islands, battling with the inhabitants in order to find and exploit the sandalwood.

=== Recruiter for Robert Towns ===
In 1863, the British entrepreneur and colonist Robert Towns, had established a cotton plantation at Townsvale in Queensland and required cheap labour to make the venture profitable. He had tried German migrant labour and Chinese and Indian coolie labour but was dissatisfied with the results. Towns decided to revisit the experiment of importing labourers from Melanesia which had been attempted in the 1840s by Benjamin Boyd. Towns negotiated with his business partners in the sandalwood trade in the Pacific region and Henry Ross-Lewin was employed to organise the first shipment of South Sea Islander labour to the Townsvale plantation. Ross-Lewin was appointed second-mate and recruiter on the vessel Don Juan which sailed to places such as Tanna, the Loyalty Islands and Erromango to obtain labourers.

On 15 August 1863 the Don Juan arrived in the port of Brisbane with 73 South Sea Islanders, one of whom died on arrival from exhaustion and was buried on Mud Island in Moreton Bay. They were transported to the plantation at Townsvale with Ross-Lewin and William Tutin Walker being employed in managing the workers and the operations there. Immediately, allegations of crimes such as kidnap and slavery were made, and Towns responded with the publication of a pamphlet outlining the instructions he gave to Ross-Lewin in regards to recruitment of the labourers. This pamphlet was later criticised for possibly being written after voyage and for the conditions specified for the labourers not being met in that shelter was not provided, wages not paid and the Islanders not returned home. Under Ross-Lewin's management at Townsvale, the workers were subject to hard work, poor diet and a lack of medical care, with some deaths being recorded. Ross-Lewin conducted other recruitment voyages for Towns over the next few years and was charged with kidnapping in relation to at least one of these trips.

=== Independent recruiting agent ===
In 1867, Lewin advertised his services to obtain and provide Islander labour for sugar planters and cotton growers in the colony. He claimed he could procure "the very best and most serviceable natives to be had among the islands" for the price of £7 per head. After receiving the orders for labourers, Ross-Lewin chartered the King Oscar vessel and set out for the islands. At Epi Island, he organised an ambush on a local village where 20 men and women were captured and "recruited", while at Aniwa Island he tricked another group of Islanders into coming onto the vessel believing that he was taking them to the nearby missionary outpost. The King Oscar returned to Queensland in November 1867 with 225 labourers and soon after completed a second voyage returning with another 282 Islanders. Ross-Lewin sold these people for an average of £9 per head and made around £2,000 profit. In 1868, Ross-Lewin chartered the Spunkie, a vessel with the appearance of being a missionary ship, and conducted further recruitment voyages, often enticing Islanders on board by getting the crew to pretend to be missionaries or more simply by ramming their canoes and picking them out of the water.

=== The Daphne case and child rape accusations ===
In 1868, Ross-Lewin, partnered with Thomas Pritchard and bought an old ship named Daphne to operate as a labour vessel for the Queensland market. The first shipment was completed and arrived in Brisbane in late 1868. On board was a thirteen year old Tannese girl who had been Ross-Lewin's concubine. She was sold to a plantation owner for £20 and Ross-Lewin was accused of raping her. He appeared before the Brisbane Police Court but was acquitted.

Ross-Lewin left Queensland after these accusations and established himself at his Sangalie plantation on Tanna. The Daphne continued recruiting operations on behalf on Ross-Lewin and the other owners, but focused more on providing labour for the colonists in Fiji. In 1869, while in harbour at Levuka in Fiji, the Daphne was examined by Captain George Palmer of the Royal Navy. Palmer found that the Daphne was fitted out like an "African slaver minus the irons" with the Islanders on board looking emaciated and having little knowledge of why they were on the ship. Palmer was surprised that Ross-Lewin had received a licence from the Queensland Government to undertake recruiting voyages and found that the going price for Islander labour at Levuka was £5 to £6 per head "like so many cattle." Palmer impounded the vessel, released the Islanders and arrested Thomas Pritchard and the captain, a man named Daggett. Despite paperwork clearly showing Ross-Lewin as the licence-holder of the vessel, he never faced any charges. Captain Daggett and Pritchard faced trial in Sydney but all charges were quickly dismissed and furthermore, Sir Alfred Stephen, the Chief Justice of the New South Wales Supreme Court found that Captain Palmer had illegally seized the Daphne and ordered him to pay reparations to the owners of the Daphne.

== Death ==
In April 1874 at his Sangalie Plantation on the island of Tanna, Ross-Lewin shot a pig belonging to a local man. In an altercation that followed, he punched and knocked down "a native named Jemmy". On the afternoon of the same day, local people came to Sangalie and shot dead Ross-Lewin while he was gardening. At that time, Ross-Lewin's pregnant wife, her two brothers and her son were residing at the plantation. On seeing his dead body, they decided to flee in an open boat taking Ross-Lewin's corpse with them. Both the brothers had dysentery and one died while they were at sea. Ross-Lewin's wife, Eliza, also had a still-birth in the open boat. The survivors were picked up by a passing schooner and taken to Port Havannah where the other brother-in-law later died. Ross-Lewin's body was either buried at sea or at a nearby mission.

== Family ==
Ross-Lewin married Eliza Jane Heaney, daughter of Hugh Heaney, in May 1863. After surviving the expulsion from Tanna, Eliza arrived in Sydney in July 1875 with her only surviving child. This child was Harrison Westropp Ross-Lewin who married Harriett Miller in 1888 but deserted her in 1895. His second marriage was to Emily Weekes in 1897 and they had three daughters. Harrison died in 1903 after breaking his back during a fight.
