= Blackbirding =

Coerced labour, mainly in the southeast Pacific

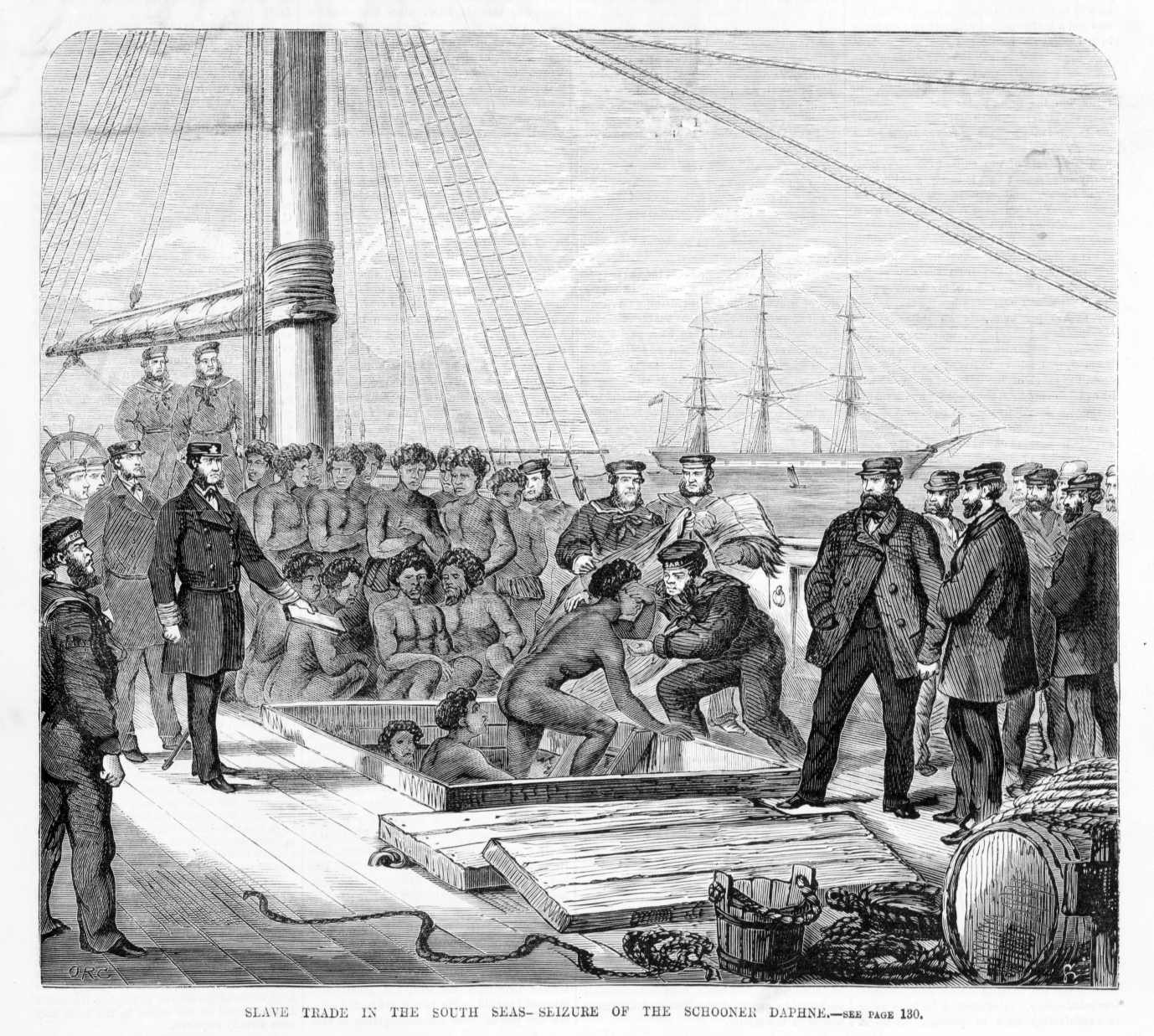
In 1869, HMS Rosario seized the blackbirding schooner Daphne and freed its passengers, who were bound for Queensland, Australia.

Blackbirding was the trade in indentured labourers especially from the Pacific Islands in the 19th and early 20th centuries. It is often described as a form of slavery, despite the Slave Trade Act 1807 and the Slavery Abolition Act 1833 abolishing slavery throughout the British Empire, including Australia. The trade frequently relied on coercion, deception and kidnapping to transport tens of thousands of indigenous people from islands in the Pacific Ocean to Australia, other European colonies, and independent countries of the Pacific and Central and South America, often to work on plantations in conditions similar to the Atlantic slave trade. These blackbirded people, known in Australia as Kanakas or South Sea Islanders, were taken from places such as Papua New Guinea, the Solomon Islands, Vanuatu, Niue, Easter Island, the Gilbert Islands, Tuvalu and the islands of the Bismarck Archipelago, amongst others.

The owners, captains, and crews of the ships involved in the acquisition of these labourers were termed blackbirders. Blackbirding ships began operations in the Pacific from the 1840s and continued, in some cases, into the 1930s. The demand for this kind of cheap labour principally came from sugar cane, cotton, and coffee plantations in New South Wales, Queensland, Samoa, New Caledonia, Fiji, Tahiti and Hawaii. In Auckland, a small group of South Sea Islanders worked in flax mills. Examples of blackbirding outside the South Pacific include the early days of the pearling industry in Western Australia at Nickol Bay and Broome, where Aboriginal Australians were blackbirded from the surrounding areas. In Peru, Mexico, Guatemala, and elsewhere in the Americas, blackbirders sought workers for their haciendas and to mine the guano deposits on the Chincha Islands.

== Australia ==
=== New South Wales ===
The first major blackbirding operation in the Pacific was conducted out of Twofold Bay in New South Wales. A shipload of 65 Melanesian labourers arrived in Boyd Town on 16 April 1847 on board Velocity, a vessel under the command of Captain Kirsopp and chartered by Benjamin Boyd. Boyd was a Scottish colonist who wanted cheap labourers to work at his large pastoral leaseholds in the colony of New South Wales. He financed two more procurements of South Sea Islanders, 70 of which arrived in Sydney in September 1847, and another 57 in October of that same year. Many of these Islanders soon absconded from their workplaces and were observed starving and destitute on the streets of Sydney. Reports of violence, kidnap and murder used during the recruitment of these labourers surfaced in 1848 with a closed-door enquiry choosing not to take any action against Boyd or Kirsopp. The experiment of exploiting Melanesian labour was discontinued in Australia until Robert Towns recommenced the practice in Queensland when he fitted out the schooner Don Juan and, in August 1863, despatched her on a recruiting voyage under the command of Captain Greuber.

=== Queensland ===
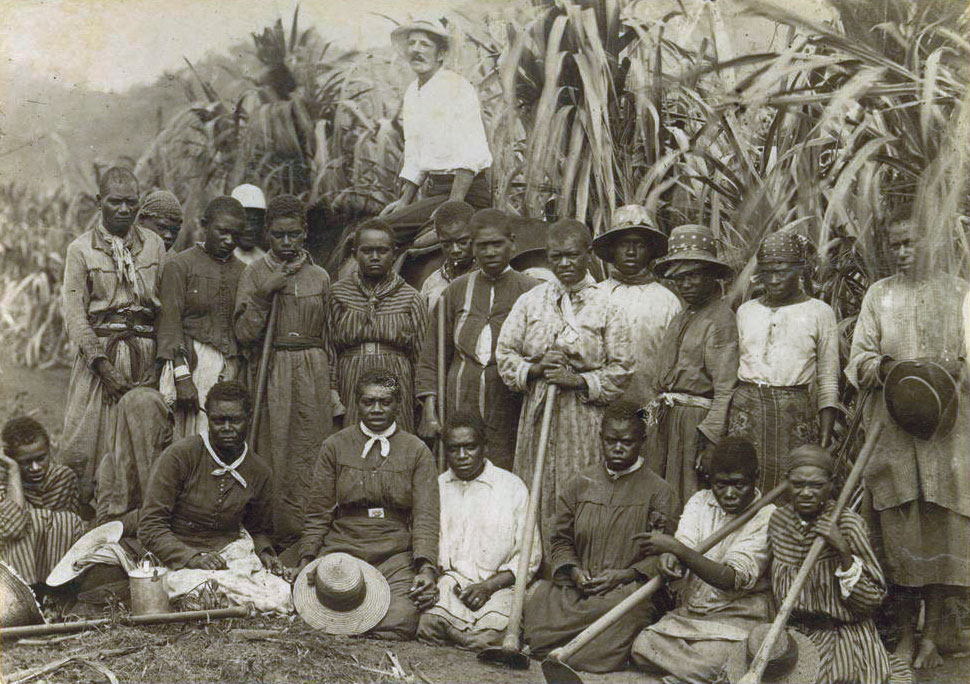
Kanaka workers in a sugar cane plantation in Queensland, late 19th century.

The Queensland labour trade in South Sea Islanders, who were commonly known as Kanakas, was in operation from 1863 to 1908. Some 55,000 to 62,500 labourers were brought to Australia, most being recruited or blackbirded from islands in Melanesia, such as the New Hebrides (now Vanuatu), the Solomon Islands and the islands around New Guinea.

The process of acquiring these labourers varied from violent kidnapping at gunpoint to relatively acceptable negotiation, although most of the people affiliated with the trade were regarded as blackbirders nonetheless. The majority of those taken were male and around one quarter were under the age of sixteen. In total, approximately 15,000 Kanakas (30%) died while working in Queensland – excluding those who died in transit or were killed in the recruitment process – mostly during three-year contracts. This is also similar to the estimated 33% death rate for enslaved Africans in the first three years of arriving in the United States, Brazil, and the Caribbean; the conditions were often comparable to those in the Atlantic slave trade.

==== Robert Towns and the first shipments ====
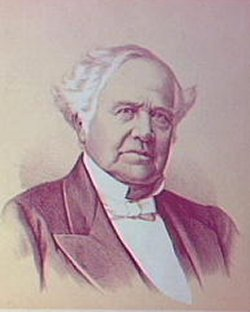
Robert Towns

In 1863, Robert Towns, a British sandalwood and whaling merchant residing in Sydney, wanted to profit from the world-wide cotton shortage due to the American Civil War. He bought a property he named Townsvale on the Logan River south of Brisbane, and planted 160 hectares (400 acres) of cotton. Towns wanted cheap labour to harvest and prepare the cotton and decided to import Melanesian labour from the Loyalty Islands and the New Hebrides. Captain Grueber together with labour recruiter Henry Ross Lewin aboard Don Juan, brought 67 South Sea Islanders to the port of Brisbane on 17 August 1863. Towns specifically wanted adolescent males. Recruitment and kidnapping were reportedly employed in obtaining these boys.

Over the following two years, Towns imported around 400 more Melanesians to Townsvale on one to three year terms of labour. They came on Uncle Tom (Captain Archer Smith) and Black Dog (Captain Linklater). In 1865, Towns obtained large land leases in Far North Queensland and funded the establishment of the port of Townsville. He organised the first importation of South Sea Islander labour to that port in 1866. They came aboard Blue Bell under Captain Edwards.

Towns paid many of his Kanaka labourers in goods instead of cash at the end of their working terms. His agent claimed that blackbirded labourers were "savages who did not know the use of money" and therefore did not deserve cash wages. Apart from a small amount of Melanesian labour imported for the beche-de-mer trade around Bowen, Robert Towns was the primary exploiter of blackbirded labour up until 1867, when Captain Whish, formerly an officer in H.M. Light Dragoons and subsequently the owner of a plantation near Brisbane was a leading exploiter of Melanesian labour.

Captain Louis Hope applied Melanesian labour to his twenty acres of sugar cane at Ormiston, Queensland, and later on his farm near the Coomera River. By 1868, the extent of the cultivation of sugar cane exceeded that of cotton; which increased the demand for labour. Licences for recruiting ships were issued by Queensland, New South Wales and Victoria, as well as Fiji.

==== Expansion of labour recruitment for Queensland ====
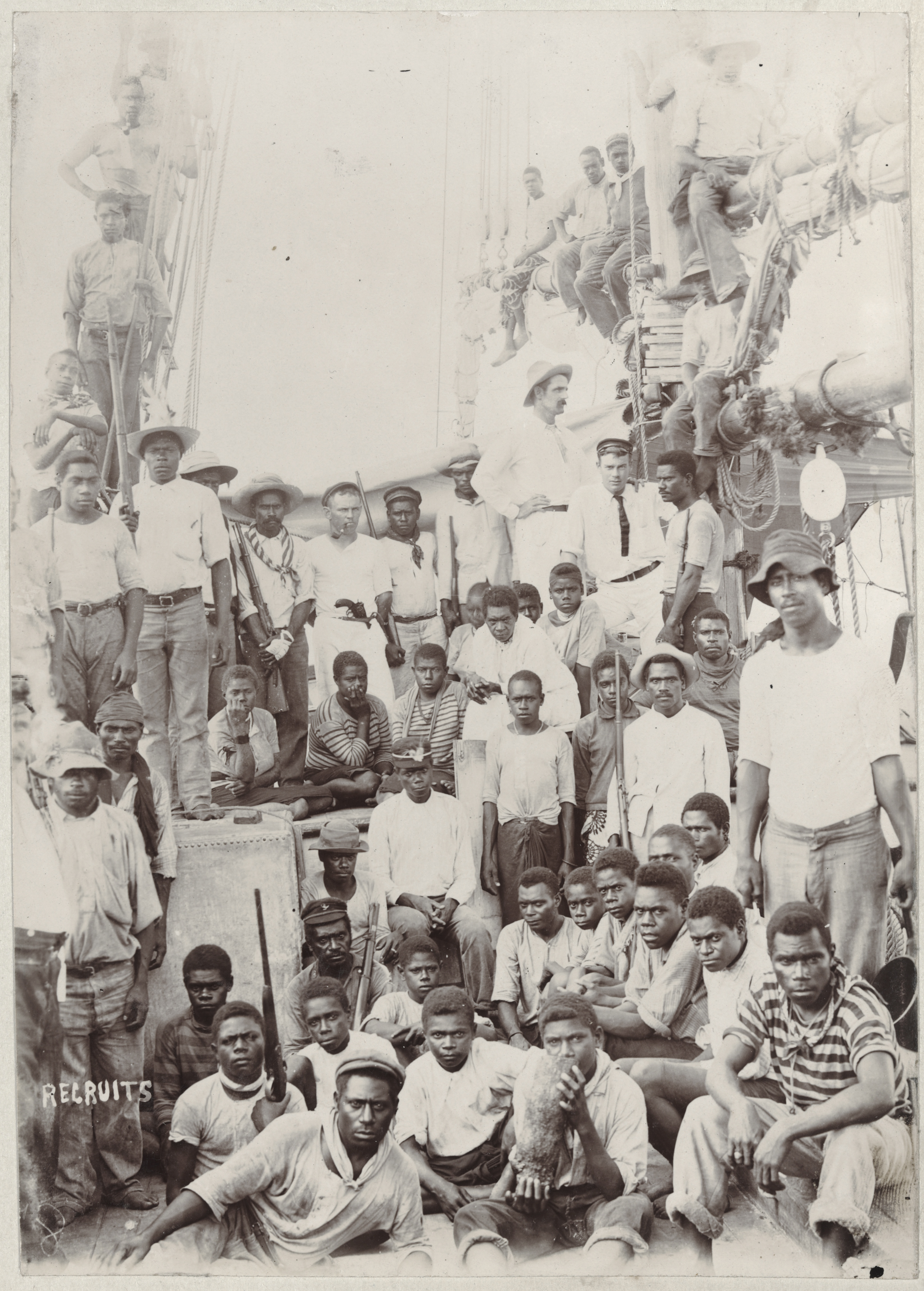
Vanuatuan recruits for sugar plantations in Australia, Vanuatu, c. 1910

The high demand for very cheap labour in the sugar and pastoral industries of Queensland resulted in Towns' main labour recruiter, Henry Ross Lewin, and John Crossley, another recruiter, opening their services to other land-owners. In 1867, King Oscar, Spunkie, Fanny Nicholson and Prima Donna returned with close to 1,000 Kanakas who were offloaded in the ports of Brisbane, Bowen and Mackay. This influx, together with information that the recently arrived labourers were being sold for £2 each and that kidnapping was at least partially used during recruitment, raised fears of a burgeoning new slave trade. These fears were realised when French officials in New Caledonia complained that Crossley had stolen half the inhabitants of a village in Lifou, and in 1868 a scandal evolved when Captain McEachern of Syren anchored in Brisbane with 24 dead islander recruits and reports that the remaining ninety on board were taken by force and deception. Despite the controversy, no action was taken against McEachern or Crossley.

In early 1868, fears of a new slave trade and the absence of legislation governing imported non-European labour led to some public opposition to the trade in Brisbane, including a committee chaired by Joshua Jeays and a petition to Queen Victoria. The wording of the petition indicates that the opposition was motivated by a combination of indignation at the unethical treatment of the forced labour, racist views on immigration, and fears of retaliation.

Many members of the Queensland government were already either invested in the labour trade or had Kanakas actively working on their land holdings. The Polynesian Labourers Act of 1868, which they enacted in response to the Syren incident, required every ship to be licensed and carry a government agent to observe the recruitment process, but had few adequate protections and was poorly enforced. Government agents were often corrupted by bonuses paid for the numbers of labourers "recruited", and did little or nothing to prevent recruiters from tricking islanders on-board or otherwise engaging in kidnapping. The Act stipulated that the Kanakas were to be contracted for no more than three years and paid £18 for their work – an extremely low wage that was only paid at the end of their indenture. Islanders were also heavily influenced to buy overpriced goods of poor quality at designated shops before they returned home, which further deprived them of income. The Act, instead of protecting the South Sea Islanders, was criticised for giving legitimacy to a kind of slavery in Queensland.

==== The Kanaka trade in the 1870s ====
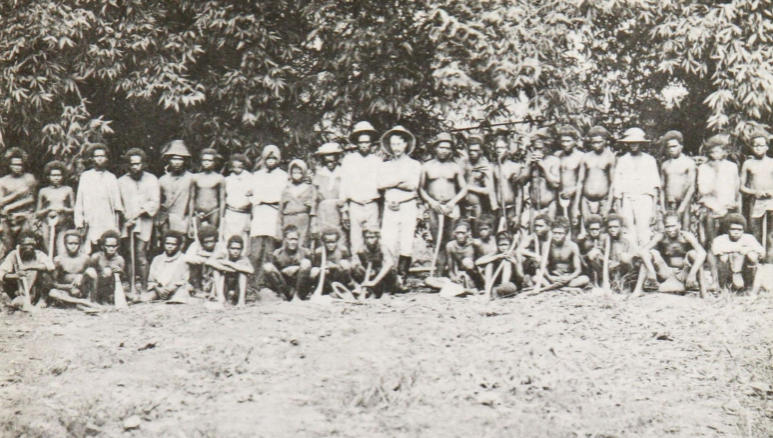
Adolescent South Sea Islanders on a Herbert River plantation in the early 1870s

Recruiting of South Sea Islanders soon became an established industry with labour vessels from across eastern Australia obtaining Kanakas for both the Queensland and Fiji markets. Captains of such ships would get paid about 5 shillings per recruit in "head money" incentives, while the owners of the ships would sell the Kanakas from anywhere between £4 and £20 per head. The Kanakas who were transported on Bobtail Nag had metal discs imprinted with a letter of the alphabet hung around their neck making for easy identification. Maryborough and Brisbane became important centres for the trade with vessels such as Spunkie, Jason and Lyttona making frequent recruiting journeys out of these ports. Reports of blackbirding, kidnap and violence were made against these vessels with Captain Winship of Lyttona being accused of kidnapping and importing Kanaka boys aged between 12 and 15 years for the plantations of George Raff at Caboolture. The Queensland Governor made enquiries and "found that there were a few islanders between fourteen and sixteen years of age, but that they, like all the others who accompanied them, had engaged without any pressure and were perfectly happy and contented". It was alleged by missionaries in the New Hebrides that one crew member of Spunkie murdered two recruits by shooting them, but the immigration agent Charles James Nichols who was on board the vessel denied this occurred. Charges of kidnap were made against Captain John Coath of Jason. Only Captain Coath was brought to trial and, despite being found guilty, he was soon pardoned and allowed to re-enter the recruiting trade. Up to 45 of the Kanakas brought in by Coath died on plantations around the Mary River. Meanwhile, the famous recruiter Henry Ross Lewin was charged with the rape of a pubescent Islander girl. Despite strong evidence, Lewin was acquitted and the girl was later sold in Brisbane for £20.

By the 1870s, South Sea Islanders were being put to work not only in cane-fields along the Queensland coast but were also widely used as shepherds upon the large sheep stations in the interior and as pearl divers in the Torres Strait. They were taken as far west as Hughenden, Normanton and Blackall. In 1876, several Islanders died, one by scurvy, on the 800 km journey they were required to make from Rockhampton to Bowen Downs Station. No police report was made and the overseer in charge was only fined £10. Whipping of the Islander labourers was found to be occurring across a number of districts including at the Ravensbourne sheep station, and at the coastal sugar plantations of Nerada and Magnolia owned by Hugh Monckton and Colonel William Feilding respectively. Fatal conflict with the landholders was at times evident, for instance a group of South Sea Islanders murdered Mr Gibbie and Mr Bell, owners of Conway station. One, possibly two of the labourers were shot by Gibbie, while the others were captured by Native Police, one dying while in their custody. When the owners of the properties went bankrupt, the Islanders would often either be abandoned or sold as part of the estate to a new owner. In the Torres Strait, Kanakas were left at isolated pearl fisheries such as the Warrior Reefs for years with little hope of being returned home. In this region, three ships used to procure pearl-shells and beche-de-mer, including Challenge were owned by James Merriman who held the position of Mayor of Sydney.

Poor conditions at the sugar plantations led to regular outbreaks of disease and death. The Maryborough plantations and the labour vessels operating out of that port became notorious for high mortality rates of Kanakas. During the measles epidemic of 1875, ships such as Jason arrived with Islanders either dead or infected with the disease. There were 30 deaths recorded of measles, followed by dysentery. From 1875 to 1880, at least 443 Kanakas died in the Maryborough region from gastrointestinal and pulmonary disease at a rate 10 times above average. The Yengarie, Yarra Yarra and Irrawarra plantations belonging to Robert Cran were particularly bad. An investigation revealed that the Islanders were overworked, underfed, not provided with medical assistance and that the water supply was a stagnant drainage pond. At the port of Mackay, the labour schooner Isabella arrived with half the Kanakas recruited dying on the voyage from dysentery, while Captain John Mackay (after whom the city of Mackay is named), arrived at Rockhampton in Flora with a cargo of Kanakas, of which a considerable number were in a dead or dying condition.

As the blackbirding activities increased and the detrimental results became more understood, resistance by the Islanders to this recruitment system grew. Labour vessels were regularly repelled from landing at many islands by local people. Recruiter, Henry Ross Lewin, was killed at Tanna Island, the crew of May Queen were killed at Pentecost Island, while the captain and crew of Dancing Wave were killed at the Nggela Islands. Blackbirders would sometimes make their vessels look like missionary ships, deceiving then kidnapping local Islanders. This led to violence against the missionaries themselves, the best example being the killing of Anglican missionary John Coleridge Patteson in 1871 at Nukapu. A few days before his death, one of the local men had been killed and five others abducted by crew of Margaret Chessel who pretended to be missionaries. Patteson may also have been killed due to his desire to take the Islanders' children to a distant mission school and that he had disrupted the local patriarchal hierarchy. At other islands blackbirding vessels, such as Mystery under Captain Kilgour, attacked villages, shooting the residents and burning their houses. Ships of the Royal Navy were also called upon to investigate the deeds and deliver appropriate punishment upon islands involved in killings of blackbirding crews and missionaries. For example, HMS Rosario in 1871 whilst investigating the Bishop Patteson murder and other conflicts between islanders, settlers and missionaries as the Commander describes in his book. And later HMS Beagle under Captain de Houghton and HMS Wolverine under Commodore John Crawford Wilson conducted several missions in the late 1870s that involved naval bombardment of villages, raids by marines, burning of houses, destruction of crops and the hanging of an Islander from the yardarms. One of these expeditions involved the assistance of the armed crew of the blackbirding vessel Sybil commanded by Captain Satini. Furthermore, two South Sea Islanders were hanged in Maryborough for the rape and attempted murder of a white woman, these being the first legal executions in that town.

==== The Pacific Islanders Protection Acts 1872 and 1875 of the United Kingdom ====
In 1872, the United Kingdom passed legislation in an attempt to control the coercive labour recruitment practices in the South Pacific Ocean: the Pacific Islanders Protection Act 1872 (the principal act), which was amended by the Pacific Islanders Protection Act 1875. The principal act provided for the Governor of one of the Australian colonies to have the authority to licence British vessels in the South Pacific Ocean to carry "native labourers". The 1875 act amended that licensing system and stated that any "British vessel may, under the principal Act, be detained, seized, and brought in for adjudication by any officer, all goods and effects found on board such vessel may also be detained, seized, and brought in for adjudication by such officer, either with or without such vessel" with the "High Court of Admiralty of England and every Vice-Admiralty Court in Her Majesty's dominions out of the United Kingdom shall have jurisdiction to try and condemn as forfeited to Her Majesty or restore any vessel, goods, and effects alleged to be detained or seized in pursuance of the principal Act or of this Act". (Note: Other acts on the same subject: Pacific Island Labourers Act 1880; Pearl-Shell and Bêche-de-mer Fishery Act 1881; Native Labourers Protection Act 1884.) The 1875 act also provided authority for "Her Majesty to exercise power and jurisdiction over Her subjects within any islands and places in the Pacific Ocean not being within Her Majesty's dominions, nor within the jurisdiction of any civilized power, in the same and as ample a manner as if such power or jurisdiction had been acquired by the cession or conquest of territory", although the 1875 act did not specify any Pacific islands to which this authority was to be applied.

The 1872 and 1875 acts were intended to work in conjunction with the British Slave Trade Act 1839 to provide the authority to arrest blackbirding ships, and charge their captains and owners with slavery charges. However, this approach to suppressing blackbirding was not successful.

In 1869, a vessel of the Royal Navy based at the Australia Station in Sydney, was sent to suppress the blackbirding trade. HMS Rosario, under Captain George Palmer, managed to intercept a blackbirding ship loaded with Islanders at Fiji. Daphne under command of Captain Daggett and licensed in Queensland to Henry Ross Lewin, was described by Palmer as being fitted out "like an African slaver". Even though there was a government agent on board, the Kanakas on board the Daphne appeared in poor condition and, having no understanding of English and no interpreter, had little idea of why they were being transported. Palmer seized the ship, freed the Kanakas and arrested both Captain Daggett and the ship's owner Thomas Pritchard for slavery. Daggett and Pritchard were taken to Sydney to be tried but all charges were quickly dismissed and the prisoners discharged. Furthermore, Sir Alfred Stephen, the Chief Justice of the New South Wales Supreme Court found that Captain Palmer had illegally seized Daphne and ordered him to pay reparations to Daggett and Pritchard. No evidence or statements were taken from the islanders. This decision, which overrode the obvious humanitarian actions of a senior officer of the Royal Navy, gave further legitimacy to the blackbirding trade out of Queensland and allowed it to flourish. It also constrained the actions by naval commanders when dealing with incidents on the high seas and also crimes against the many missionaries working on the islands.

==== Early 1880s: resistance to the blackbirders intensifies ====
The violence and death surrounding the Queensland blackbirding trade intensified in the early 1880s. Local communities in the New Hebrides and the Solomon Islands had increased access to modern firearms which made their resistance to the blackbirders more robust. Well known vessels that experienced mortality amongst their crews while attempting to recruit Islanders included Esperanza at Simbo, Pearl at Rendova Island, May Queen at Ambae Island, Stormbird at Tanna, Janet Stewart at Malaita and Isabella at Espiritu Santo amongst others. Officers of Royal Navy warships attempting punitive action were not exempt as targets with Lieutenant Bower and five crew of HMS Sandfly being killed in the Nggela Islands and Lieutenant Luckcraft of HMS Cormorant being shot dead at Espiritu Santo. Numerous punitive expeditions were carried out by Royal Navy warships based at the Australia Station. HMS Emerald under Captain William Maxwell went on an extensive punitive expedition, shelling and destroying about 33 villages, while marines of HMS Cormorant executed various Islanders suspected of killing white men. Captain Dawson of HMS Miranda led a mission to Ambae Island, killing a chief suspected of murdering blackbirders, while HMS Diamond went on a "savage-hunting expedition" throughout the Solomon Islands which resulted in no casualties on either side. At Ambrym, the marines of HMS Dart under Commander Moore, raided and burned down a village in retaliation for the killing of Captain Belbin of the blackbirding ship Borough Belle. Likewise, HMS Undine patrolled the islands, protecting the crews of blackbirding vessels such as Ceara from mutinies of the labour recruits.

==== The Age 1882 slave trade exposé ====
In 1882, the Melbourne newspaper The Age published an eight-part series written by journalist and future physician George E. Morrison, who had sailed, undercover, for the New Hebrides, while posing as crew of the brigantine slave ship, Lavinia, as it made cargo of Kanakas. "A Cruise in a Queensland Slaver. By a Medical Student" was written in a tone of wonder, expressing "only the mildest criticism"; six months later, Morrison "revised his original assessment", describing details of Lavinia's blackbirding operation, and sharply denouncing the slave trade in Queensland. His articles, letters to the editor, and The Age editorials, led to expanded government intervention.

==== Mid 1880s: Shifting of recruitment from the New Guinea islands ====
The usual recruiting grounds of the New Hebrides and Solomon Islands became too dangerous and too expensive to obtain labour from. However, the well-populated islands around New Guinea were soon targeted for recruiting as these people were less aware of the blackbirding system and had less access to firearms. A new rush for labour from these islands began, with James Burns and Robert Philp of Burns Philp & Co. purchasing several well-known blackbirding ships to quickly exploit the human resource in this region. Plantation owners such as Robert Cran also bought vessels and made contact with missionaries like Samuel MacFarlane in the New Guinea area to help facilitate the acquisition of cheap workers. Kidnapping, forced recruitment, killings, false payment and the enslavement of children was again the typical practice. Captain William T. Wawn, a famous blackbirder working for the Burns Philp company on the ship Lizzie, freely acknowledged in his memoirs that he took boatloads of young boys with no information given about contracts, pay or the nature of the work. Up to 530 boys were recruited per month from these islands, most of whom were transported to the new large company plantations in Far North Queensland, such as the Victoria Plantation owned by CSR. This phase of the trade was very profitable, with Burns Philp selling each recruit for around £23. Many of them could not speak any English and died on these plantations at a rate of up to 1 in every 5 from disease, violence and neglect.

In April 1883, the Premier of Queensland, Thomas McIlwraith attempted to annex New Guinea to be part of Queensland. This was rejected by the British Colonial Secretary mostly because of fears that it would expose even more of its inhabitants to be forcibly taken to work and possibly die in Queensland. The large influx of New Guinea labourers also sparked concern from white supremacist anti-immigration groups, which led to the election in late 1883 of Samuel Griffith on an anti-Kanaka policy platform. Griffith quickly banned recruitment from the New Guinea islands and spearheaded a number of high-profile criminal cases against blackbirding crews operating in the area. The crew of Alfred Vittery were charged with the murder of South Sea Islanders, while Captain Joseph Davies of Stanley, Captain Millman of Jessie Kelly, Captain Loutit of Ethel as well as the owners of Forest King were all charged with kidnapping. All of these cases, despite strong evidence against them, resulted in acquittal. Charges of neglect resulting in death against plantation managers were also made. For example, Mr Melhuish of the Yeppoon Sugar Plantation was tried, but even though he was found responsible, the judge involved imposed only the minimum £5 fine and wished it could be an even lesser amount. During a riot at the Mackay racetrack, several South Sea Islanders were beaten to death by mounted white men wielding stirrup irons. Only one man, George Goyner, was convicted and received a minor punishment of two months imprisonment.

==== The Hopeful case, Royal Commission and planter compensation ====
In 1884, in one specific case, a significant judicial punishment was imposed on the blackbirders. This was in regards to the crew of Hopeful vessel which was owned by Burns Philp. Captain Lewis Shaw and four crew were charged and convicted of kidnapping people from the Bismarck Archipelago, while the recruiter Neil McNeil and the boatswain were charged and convicted of murdering a number of Islanders. The kidnappers received jail terms of 7 to 10 years, while McNeil and the boatswain were sentenced to death, later commuted to life imprisonment. Despite evidence showing that at least 38 Islanders had been killed by Hopeful's crew, all the prisoners (except for one who died in jail) were released in 1890 in response to a massive public petition signed by 28,000 Queenslanders. This case sparked a Royal Commission into the recruitment of Islanders from which the Premier of Queensland concluded that it was no better than the African slave trade, and in 1885 the vessel S.S. Victoria was commissioned by the Government of Queensland to return 450 New Guinea Islanders to their homelands. Just like the global slave trade, the plantation owners, instead of being held criminally responsible, were financially compensated by the government for the loss of these returned workers. Fourteen sugar companies and individual planters including The Colonial Sugar Refining Company and David Adolphus Louis, took the Queensland Government to court to demand financial recompense and were collectively awarded £18,500. This is despite consistent evidence given in court of each plantation recording labourer death rates of up to 60% over the term of their servitude.

==== The later years of recruiting ====
Forceful recruitment of South Sea Islanders persisted in the New Guinea region, as well as in the Solomons and the New Hebrides islands, as did the high death rates of these labourers at Queensland plantations. At the Yeppoon Sugar Company, deliberate poisonings of Kanakas also occurred and when this plantation was later put up for sale, the Islander labourers were included as part of the estate. Resistance and conflict also continued. For instance, the boat crew of the labour recruiting schooner Mystery were killed in November 1878 at Longana, a district on the island of Ambae, Vanuatu (New Hebrides). In 1886 at Malaita, six crew members of the recruiting vessel Young Dick were killed together with about six islanders in a skirmish, and then in 1888 at Paama a large gun battle between the residents and the crew of Eliza Mary occurred. This ship later sank during a cyclone causing the drowning deaths of 47 Kanakas. The policy of extensive punitive expeditions carried out by the Royal Navy against the Islanders persisted as well. The official report of the lengthy mission of HMS Diamond which bombarded and burnt numerous villages in 1885 was kept secret. HMS Opal also bombarded numerous villages in punitive expeditions which elicited condemnation from some sections of the media.

Legislation was passed to end the South Sea Islander labour trade in 1890 but it was not effectively enforced and it was officially recommenced in 1892. Reports such as those by Joe Melvin, an investigative journalist who in 1892 joined the crew of Queensland blackbirding ship Helena and found no instances of intimidation or misrepresentation and concluded that the Islanders recruited did so "willingly and cannily", helped the plantation owners secure the resumption of the trade. Helena under Captain A.R. Reynolds, transported Islanders to and from Bundaberg and in this region there was a very large mortality rate of Kanakas in 1892 and 1893. South Sea Islanders made up 50% of all deaths in this period even though they only made up 20% of the total population in the Bundaberg area. The deaths were due to the hard manual labour and diseases such as dysentery, influenza and tuberculosis.

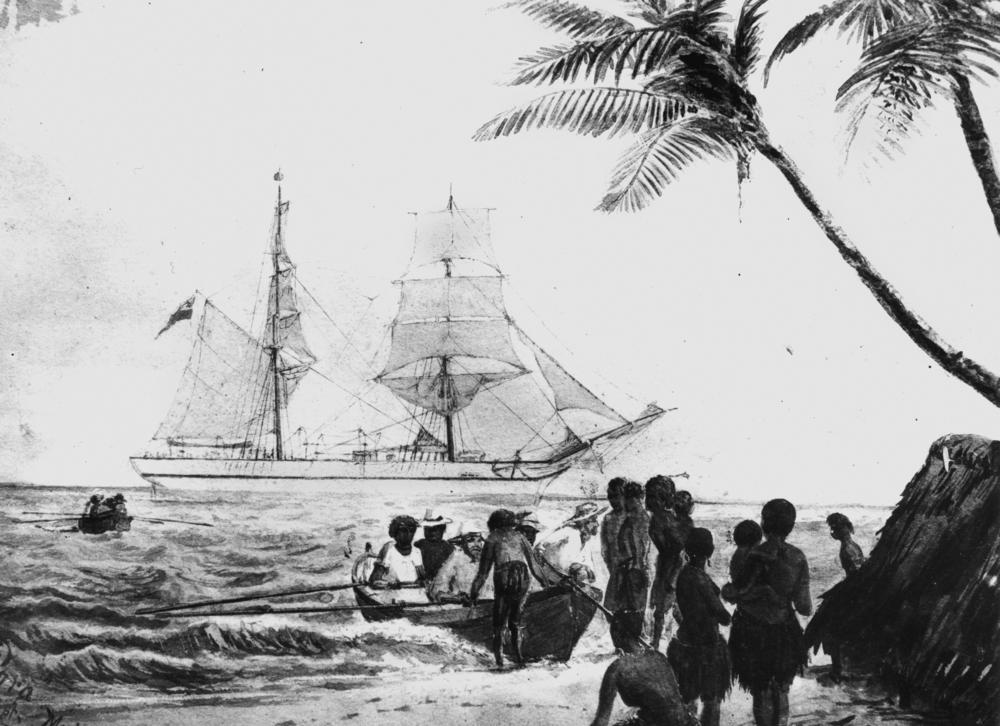
The Para, Captain John Ronald Mackay at the Solomon Islands in 1894

In the 1890s, other important recruiting vessels were Para, Lochiel, Nautilus, Rio Loge, Roderick Dhu and William Manson. Joseph Vos, a well known blackbirder for many years and the captain of William Manson, would use phonographic recordings and enlarged photographs of relatives of Islanders to induce recruits on board his vessel. Vos and his crew were involved in killings, stealing women and setting fire to villages and were charged with kidnapping. However, they were found not guilty and released. Roderick Dhu, a vessel owned by the sugar magnate Robert Cran, was another ship regularly involved in blackbirding investigations and conflict with Islanders. In 1890, it was involved in the shooting of people at Ambae Island, and evidence of kidnapping by the crew was later published. In 1893, conflict with Islanders at Espiritu Santo resulted in the death of a crew member of Roderick Dhu.

==== Repatriation ====
In 1901, the government of the newly federated British colonies of Australia legislated the "Regulation, Restriction and Prohibition of the Introduction of Labourers from the Pacific Islands" bill, better known as the Pacific Island Labourers Act 1901. This Act, which was part of a larger White Australia policy, made it illegal to import South Sea Islanders after March 1904 and mandated for the forcible deportation of all Islanders from Australia after 1906. Strong lobbying from Islander residents in Australia forced some exemptions to be made, for example, those who were married to an Australian, who owned land or who had been living for 20 years in Australia were exempt from compulsory repatriation. However, many Islanders were not made aware of these exemptions. Around 4000 to 7500 were deported in the period 1906 to 1908, while approximately 1600 remained in Australia. The Burns Philp company won the contract to deport the Islanders and those taken back to the Solomon Islands were distributed to their home islands by vessels of Lever's Pacific Plantations company. Deported Solomon Islanders who were unable to go to their villages of origin or who were born in Australia, were often put to work in plantations in these islands. In some localities, serious conflict between these workers and white colonists in the Solomon Islands ensued. Around 350 of the South Sea Islanders banished from Queensland were transferred to plantations in Fiji. At least 27 of these died while being transported.

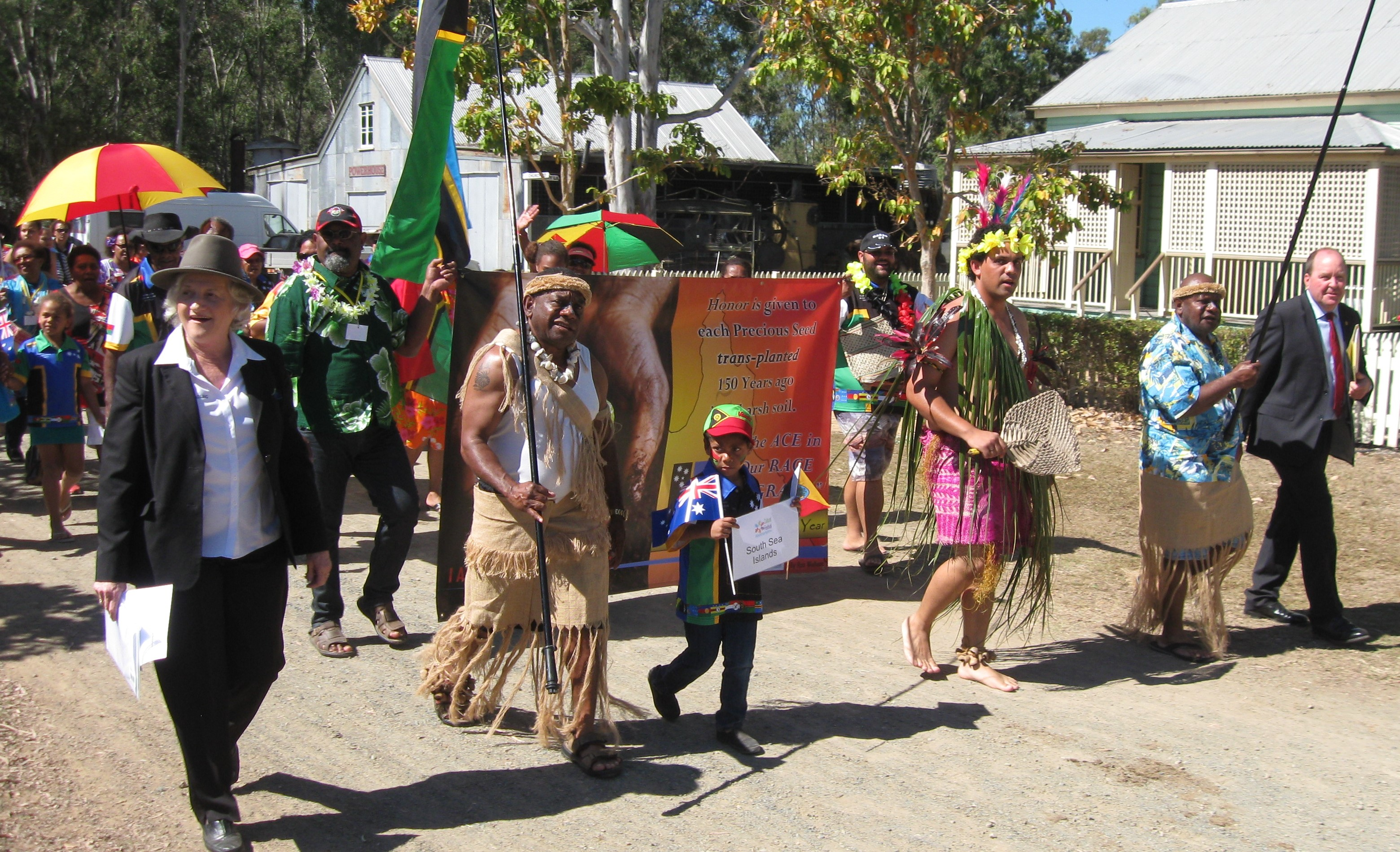
South Sea Islander community taking part in the traditional parade of nations during the 2013 Rockhampton Cultural Festival, Queensland.

Today, the descendants of those who remained are officially referred to as Australian South Sea Islanders. A 1992 census of Australian South Sea Islanders reported around 10,000 descendants living in Queensland. In the 2016 census, 6830 people in Queensland declared that they were descendants of South Sea Islander labourers.

==== Seasonal workers in the 21st century ====
In 2012, the Australian government introduced a seasonal worker scheme under the 416 and 403 visas to bring in Pacific Islander labour to work in the agricultural industry performing tasks such as picking fruit. By 2018, around 17,320 Islanders, mostly from Vanuatu, Fiji and Tonga, had been employed with the majority being placed on farms in Queensland. Workers under this programme have often been subject to working long hours in extreme temperatures and being forced to live in squalid conditions. Poor access to clean water, adequate food and medical assistance has resulted in several deaths. These reports, together with allegations of workers receiving as little as $10 a week after rent and transport deductions, resulted in the "Harvest Trail Inquiry" into the conditions of migrant horticultural workers. This inquiry confirmed widespread exploitation, intimidation and underpayment of workers with at least 55% of employers being non-compliant in regard to payments and conditions. It found many workers were contracted under a "piece rate" of pay with no written agreement and no minimum hourly rate (as is typical for Australian seasonal agricultural workers). Even though some wages were recovered and a number of employers and contractors were fined, the inquiry found that much more regulation was needed. Despite this report, the government expanded the programme in 2018 with the Pacific Labour Scheme which includes three-year contracts. Strong parallels have been drawn with the working conditions observed under this programme to those of blackbirded Pacific Islander labourers in the 19th Century.

The introduction of the Modern Slavery Act 2018 into Australian law was partly based upon concerns of slavery being evident in the Queensland agricultural sector. Some commentators have also drawn parallels between blackbirding and the early 21st-century recruitment of labour under the (unconnected) 457 visa scheme.

=== Western Australia ===
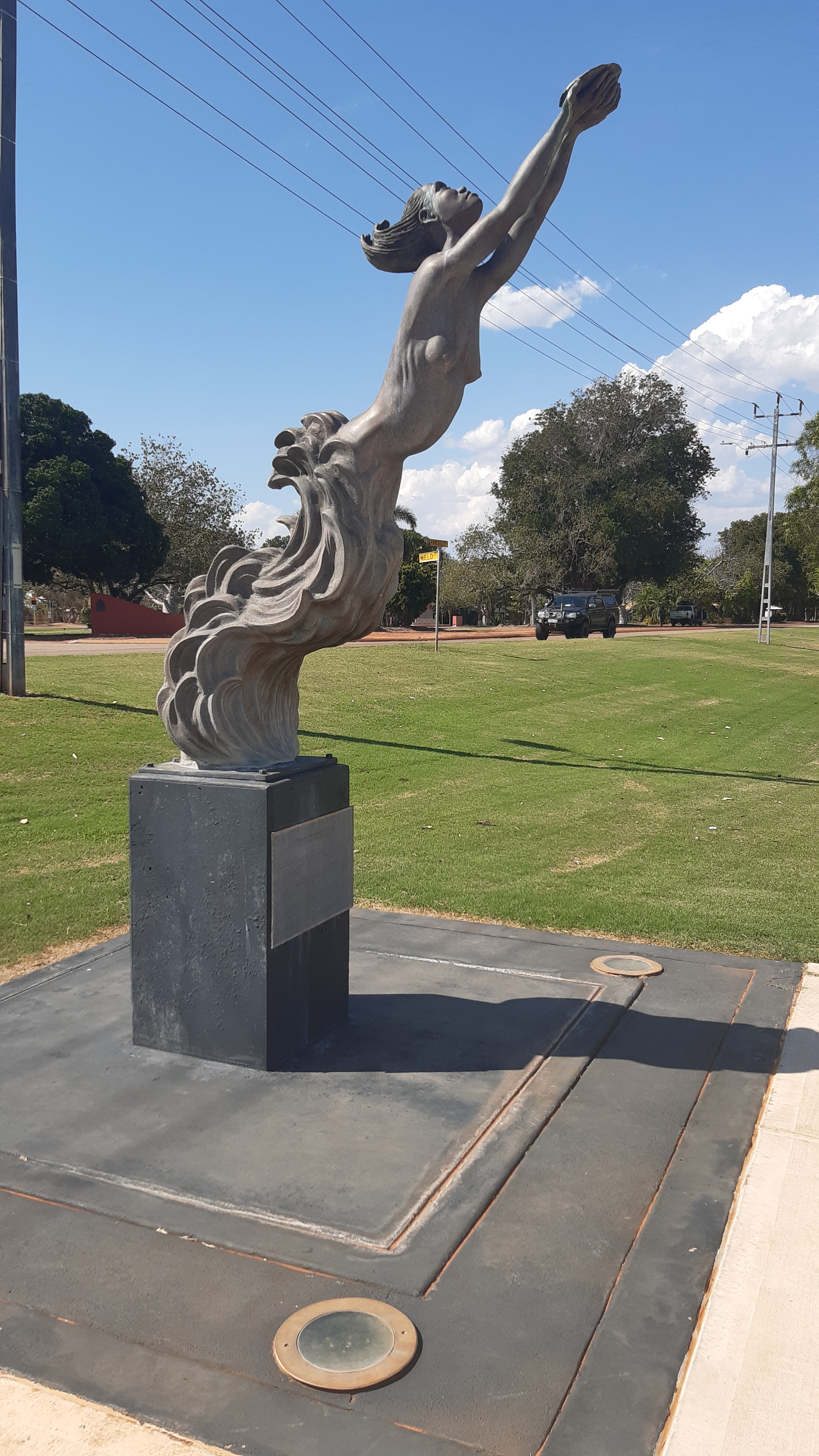
The Women of Pearling monument in Broome features a female Aboriginal pearl diver surfacing with a shell, and acknowledges those exploited as divers during Broome's pearling heyday

The early days of the pearling industry in Western Australia at Nickol Bay and Broome, saw Aboriginal Australians blackbirded from the surrounding areas. After settlement the Aborigines were used as slave labour in the emerging commercial industry.

During the early 1870s, Francis Cadell became involved in whaling, trading, pearling and blackbirding in North-West Australia. Cadell and others became notorious for their coercion, capture and sale of Aboriginal people as slaves. The slaves were often detained temporarily at camps known as barracoons on Barrow Island, 30 nautical miles (56 km) offshore. In 1875 magistrate Robert Fairbairn was sent to investigate pearling conditions at Shark Bay, following reports that people, described as Malays, employed by Cadell and Charles Broadhurst were unpaid, unable to return home and some had starved to death. Fairbairn held that Cadell had not paid 10 Malays from the time they were engaged at Batavia in 1874 and he was required to pay the 10 Malays plus an additional 4 months wages as amends for the lack of food, totaling £198. 14s. 4d. They received just £16. 16s. from the sale of Cadell's property at Shark Bay as Cadell had left the Colony of Western Australia some months previously. Broadhurst was also found to have underpaid 18 Malays totaling £183. 4s. 2d. however the judgement was set aside by the Supreme Court on the technicality that Broadhurst had not been given proper notice of the claim.

== Fiji ==
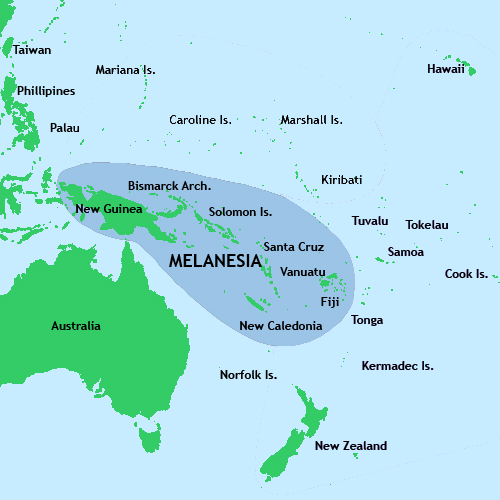
Map of Melanesia

=== Before annexation (1865 to 1874) ===
The blackbirding era began in Fiji on 5 July 1865 when Ben Pease received the first licence to transport 40 labourers from the New Hebrides to Fiji in order to work on cotton plantations. The American Civil War had cut off the supply of cotton to the international market and cultivation of this cash crop in Fiji was potentially an extremely profitable business. Thousands of Anglo-American and Anglo-Australian planters flocked to Fiji to establish plantations and the demand for cheap labour boomed. Transportation of Kanaka labour to Fiji continued up until 1911 when it became prohibited by law. A probable total of around 45,000 Islanders were taken to work in Fiji during this 46-year period with approximately a quarter of these dying while under their term of labour.

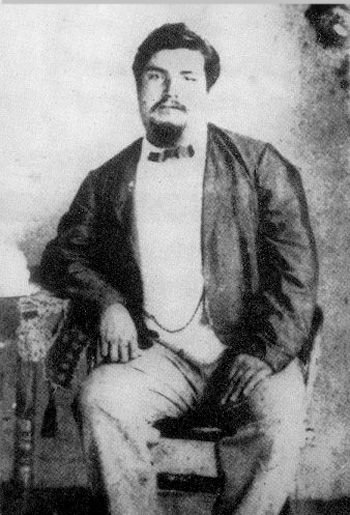
Blackbirding sea Captain William Henry Bully Hayes.

Albert Ross Hovell, son of the noted explorer William Hilton Hovell, was a prominent blackbirder in the early years of the Fijian labour market. In 1867 he was captain of Sea Witch, recruiting men and boys from Tanna and Lifou. The following year, Hovell was in command of Young Australian which was involved in an infamous voyage resulting in charges of murder and slavery being laid. After being recruited, at least three Islanders were shot dead aboard the vessel and the rest sold in Levuka for £1,200. Hovell and his supercargo, Hugo Levinger, were arrested in Sydney in 1869, found guilty by jury and sentenced to death. This was later commuted to life imprisonment but both were discharged from prison only after a couple of years.

In 1868, the Acting British Consul in Fiji, John Bates Thurston, brought only minor regulations upon the trade through the introduction of a licensing system for the labour vessels. Melanesian labourers were generally recruited for a term of three years at a rate of three pounds per year and issued with basic clothing and rations. The payment was half of that offered in Queensland and like that colony was only given at the end of the three-year term usually in the form of poor quality goods rather than cash. Most Melanesians were recruited by combination of deceit and violence, and then locked up in the ship's hold to prevent escape. They were sold in Fiji to the colonists at a rate of £3 to £6 per head for males and £10 to £20 for females. After the expiry of the three-year contract, the government required captains to transport the surviving labourers back to their villages, but many were disembarked at places distant from their homelands.

A notorious incident of the blackbirding trade was the 1871 voyage of the brig Carl, organised by Dr James Patrick Murray, to recruit labourers to work in the plantations of Fiji. Murray had his men reverse their collars and carry black books, so to appear to be church missionaries. When islanders were enticed to a religious service, Murray and his men would produce guns and force the islanders onto boats. During the voyage Murray and his crew shot about 60 islanders. He was never brought to trial for his actions, as he was given immunity in return for giving evidence against his crew members. The captain of Carl, Joseph Armstrong, along with the mate Charles Dowden were sentenced to death, which was later commuted to life imprisonment.

Some Islanders brought to Fiji against their will demonstrated desperate actions to escape from their situation. Some groups managed to overpower the crews of smaller vessels to take command of these ships and attempt to sail back to their home islands. For example, in late 1871, Islanders aboard Peri being transported to a plantation on a smaller Fijian island, freed themselves, killed most of the crew and took charge of the vessel. Unfortunately, the ship was low in supplies and was blown westward into the open ocean where they spent two months adrift. Eventually, Peri was spotted by Captain John Moresby aboard HMS Basilisk near to Hinchinbrook Island off the coast of Queensland. Only thirteen of the original eighty kidnapped Islanders were alive and able to be rescued.

Labour vessels involved in this period of blackbirding for the Fijian market also included Donald McLean under the command of captain McLeod, and Flirt under captain McKenzie who often took people from Erromango. Captain Martin of Wild Duck stole people from Espiritu Santo, while other ships such as Lapwing, Kate Grant, Harriet Armytage and Frolic also participated in the kidnapping trade. The famous blackbirder, Bully Hayes kidnapped Islanders for the Fiji market in his Sydney-registered schooner, Atlantic. Many captains engaged in violent means to obtain the labourers. The crews of Margaret Chessel, Maria Douglass and Marion Renny were involved in fatal conflict with various Islanders. Captain Finlay McLever of Nukulau was arrested and tried in court for kidnapping and assault but was discharged due to a legal technicality.

The passing of the Pacific Islanders Protection Act in 1872 by the British government was meant to improve the conditions for the Islanders but instead it legitimised the labour trade and the treatment of the blackbirded Islanders upon the Fiji plantations remained appalling. In his 1873 report, the British Consul to Fiji, Edward March, outlined how the labourers were treated as slaves. They were given insufficient food, subjected to regular beatings and sold on to other colonists. If they became rebellious they were either imprisoned by their owners or sentenced by magistrates (who were also plantation owners) to heavy labour. The planters were allowed to inflict punishment and restrain the Islanders as they saw fit and young girls were openly bartered for and sold into sexual slavery. Many workers were not paid and those who survived and were able to return to their home islands were regarded as lucky.

=== After annexation (1875 to 1911) ===
The British annexed Fiji in October 1874 and the labour trade in Pacific Islanders continued as before. In 1875, the year of the catastrophic measles epidemic, the chief medical officer in Fiji, Sir William MacGregor, listed a mortality rate of 540 out of every 1,000 Islander labourers. The Governor of Fiji, Sir Arthur Gordon, endorsed not only the procuring of Kanaka labour but became an active organiser in the plan to expand it to include mass importation of indentured coolie workers from India. The establishment of the Western Pacific High Commission in 1877, which was based in Fiji, further legitimised the trade by imposing British authority upon most people living in Melanesia.

Violence and kidnapping persisted with Captain Haddock of Marion Renny shooting people at Makira and burning their villages. Captain John Daly of Heather Belle was convicted of kidnapping and jailed but was soon allowed to leave Fiji and return to Sydney. Many deaths continued to occur upon the blackbirding vessels bound for Fiji, with perhaps the worst example from this period being that which occurred on Stanley. This vessel was chartered by the colonial British government in Fiji to conduct six recruiting voyages for the Fiji labour market. Captain James Lynch was in command and on one of these voyages he ordered 150 recruits to be locked in the ship's hold during an extended period of stormy weather. By the time the ship arrived in Levuka, around fifty Islanders had died from suffocation and neglect. A further ten who were hospitalised were expected to die. Captain Lynch and the crew of Stanley faced no recriminations for this disaster and were soon at sea again recruiting for the government.

This conflict together with competition for Pacific Islander labour from Queensland made recruiting sufficient workers for the Fiji plantations difficult. Beginning in 1879 with the arrival of Leonidas, the transport of Indian indentured labourers to Fiji commenced. However, this coolie labour was more expensive and the market for blackbirded Islander workers remained strong for much of the 1880s. In 1882, the search for new sources of Islander labour expanded firstly to the Line Islands and then to New Britain and New Ireland. The very high death rate of Line Islanders taken for the Fiji market quickly forced the prohibition of taking people from there. Although the death rates of recruits from New Britain and New Ireland were also high, the trade in humans from these islands was allowed to continue. The Colonial Sugar Refining Company made major investments in the Fijian sugar industry around this time with much of the labour being provided by workers from New Britain. Many of the recruits taken from this island on the labour vessel Lord of Isles were put to work on the CSR sugar mill at Nausori. The Fijian labour report for the years 1878 to 1882 revealed that 18 vessels were engaged in the trade, recruiting 7,137 Islanders with 1270 or nearly 20% of these dying while in Fiji. Fijian registered ships involved in the trade at this stage included Winifred, Meg Merrilies, Dauntless and Ovalau.

By 1890, the number of Melanesian labourers declined in preference to imported Indian indentured workers, but they were still being recruited and employed in such places as sugar mills and ports. In 1901, Islanders continued to be sold in Fiji for £15 per head and it was only in 1902 that a system of paying monthly cash wages directly to the workers was proposed. When Islander labourers were expelled from Queensland in 1906, around 350 were transferred to the plantations in Fiji. After the system of recruitment ended in 1911, those who remained in Fiji settled in areas like the region around Suva. Their multi-cultural descendants identify as a distinct community but, to outsiders, their language and culture cannot be distinguished from native Fijians. Descendants of Solomon Islanders have filed land claims to assert their right to traditional settlements in Fiji. A group living at Tamavua-i-Wai in Fiji received a High Court verdict in their favour on 1 February 2007. The court refused a claim by the Seventh-day Adventist Church to force the islanders to vacate the land on which they had been living for seventy years.

== French Polynesia ==
In 1863, British capitalist William Stewart set up the Tahiti Cotton and Coffee Plantation Company at Atimaono on the south-west coast of Tahiti. Initially Stewart used imported Chinese coolie labour but soon shifted to blackbirded Polynesian labour to work the plantation. Bully Hayes, an American ship-captain who achieved notoriety for his activities in the Pacific from the 1850s to the 1870s, arrived in Papeete, Tahiti in December 1868 on his ship Rona with 150 men from Niue. Hayes offered them for sale as indentured labourers. The French Governor of Tahiti, who was invested in the company, used government ships such as Lucene to recruit South Sea Islanders for Stewart. These people were unloaded in a "half-naked and wholly starved" condition and on arrival at the plantation they were treated as slaves. Captain Blackett of the vessel Moaroa, was also chartered by Stewart to acquire labourers. In 1869, Blackett bought 150 Gilbert Islanders from another blackbirding ship for £5 per head. On transferring them to Moaroa, the islanders, including another 150 already imprisoned on the vessel, rebelled killing Blackett and some of the crew. The remaining crew managed to isolate the islanders to a part of the ship and then used explosives to blow them up. Close to 200 people were killed in this incident with Moaroa still able to offload about 60 surviving labourers at Tahiti.

Conditions at the Atimaono plantation were appalling with long hours, heavy labour, poor food and inadequate shelter being provided. Harsh punishment was meted out to those who did not work and sickness was prevalent. The mortality rate for one group of blackbirded labourers at Atimaono was around 80%. William Stewart died in 1873 and the Tahiti Cotton and Coffee Plantation Company went bankrupt a year later.

Another notorious blackbirder was a fellow countryman of Bully Hayes, who was also given the nickname "Bully". Captain "Bully" Proctor procured workers for the New Caledonian nickel mines, and who was well known in the 1870s to 1890s, in Noumea, and Samoa. He was master of the Ika Vula and the Ernestine. He was also known as "Captain One Leg", and would put fear into people by firing his pistol into his wooden leg. He boasted of murdering 15 people, and was notorious for shooting the husband of New Hebridean woman who Proctor was sexually abusing. After an incident on Futuna in 1876 when he assaulted 2 missionaries, he was subdued and removed from the island.

== Kingdom of Hawaiʻi ==
The sugar industry in the Kingdom of Hawaiʻi was expanding rapidly during the early 1870s and despite over 50% of all male able-bodied Native Hawaiians being utilised as workers on these plantations, there were an insufficient number to keep up with production. From 1868 to 1872, around 200 people from places such as Tahiti, the Caroline Islands, and the Line Islands were recruited to work on the Hawaiian plantations owned by European settlers. Most of these people died and the operation was considered a failure. However, in 1877 British officials in Hawaiʻi planned a more organised system of Pacific Islander recruitment. Captain H.W. Mist of the Royal Navy was employed to arrange a large shipment of Islanders to be recruited for Hawaiʻi. Mist bought the vessel Stormbird in Sydney and appointed another ex-navy officer, Captain George Jackson, to conduct the expedition. On this first voyage, Stormbird recruited 85 people from Rotuma, Nonouti, Maiana and Tabiteuea. Jackson called in at Pohnpei on the way to Hawaiʻi where he chained up a local headman and shot another trying to attempt a rescue. During the voyage, Jackson had attempted to kidnap at gunpoint a number of young women from Maiana but was interrupted by the presence of another ship.

Stormbird made around another five recruiting voyages involving further violence and kidnapping, mostly sailing to the Gilbert Islands. On one occasion, the government agent aboard the vessel, Henry Freeman, bought a boatload of Gilbert Islanders from another blackbirding vessel named the Sea Waif. By 1880 the labour trade to Hawaiʻi expanded to the New Hebrides. Captain Cadigan of Pomare took people from these islands via night raids, armed attacks and firing cannon at canoes. The death rates of the recruits on board Pomare as they were transported to Hawaiʻi were as high as 20%. Captain Tierney of the labour vessel Hazard was paid by the Planters' Labour and Supply Company of Hawaii $15 per recruit and consequently used much deception in obtaining a profitable quota of human cargo. Other ships involved were Kaluna, Elsinore, Hawaii, Nickolaus, Mana and Allie Rowe. Allie Rowe undertook the last recruiting voyage to the Pacific Islands for the Hawaiian plantations in 1887. This vessel, commanded by Captain Phillips, proceeded illegally without a license and Phillips was also later charged and convicted of kidnap in relation to this final voyage.

From 1868 until the 1887 when the recruiting of Pacific Islanders to Hawaiʻi was largely replaced with the more cost-effective Japanese immigration scheme, some 2,600 Islanders were recruited. From 1880 to 1883 these people were protected by strong government measures which included an appointed Protector of Pacific Islanders, routine checks of worker conditions and the ability of the labourers to take employers to court for maltreatment. These workers, usually on 3 year contracts, were also paid cash wages at the end of each month which amounted from £10 to £16 per annum. In spite of these conditions during these years, the mortality rate of the workers was still over 10% for each year. Outside of these years, where protections were less, the death rate was much higher.

When recruiting ended in 1887, 650 Pacific Islander workers remained or were left abandoned in Hawaiʻi and by 1895 this number had reduced to less than 400. In 1904, 220 mostly Gilbert Islanders continued to live in poverty at Honolulu and on Maui. These people were gathered together and repatriated in that same year to the Gilbert Islands where they faced further destitution in a land they had been absent from for twenty years.

== New Caledonia ==
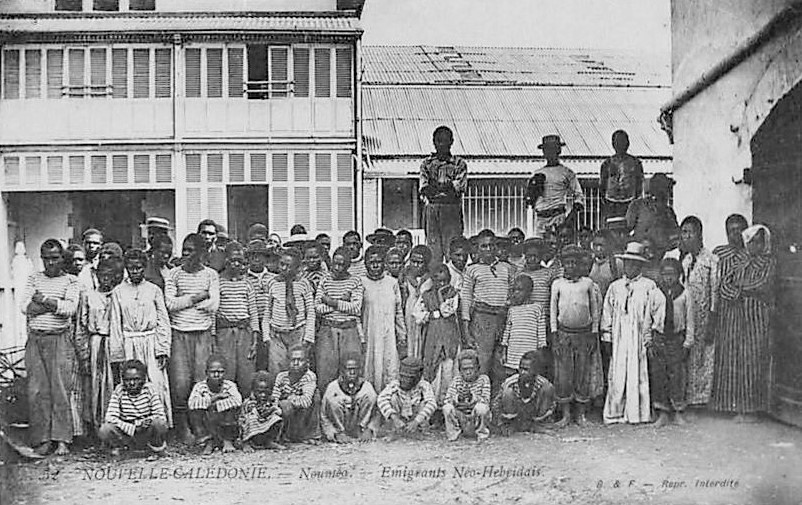
New Hebrides workers in Noumea.

Blackbirding and recruitment of South Sea Islanders as labourers to the French colony of New Caledonia began in 1865 and lasted until the 1930s. Around 15,000 people were transported during this period, the vast majority coming from the New Hebrides. In 1865, the French colonial government contracted sandalwood merchant Andrew Henry to bring 33 people from Erromango. Henry had previously been involved in sending labourers to Queensland for the cotton plantations of Robert Towns. Another recruiter, John Higginson, entered the trade in 1868, and by 1870, around 720 Islanders had been brought to labour in New Caledonia. A mining boom in 1873 saw a large increase in labour demand and many more ships became involved in the blackbirding trade with 900 Islanders being recruited in 1874 alone. Apart from some early government controls in the 1860s, the recruitment of Islanders was highly unregulated and open to abuse. Children as young as six years old could be legally recruited on lengthy contracts of up to twelve years. These children could also be legally paid at only half the rate of adults and given only half the required rations. Somewhere between a quarter and half of all the Islanders transported and forced to labour at New Caledonia were children.

The blackbirded labourers in New Caledonia worked in the plantation, mining, pastoral, domestic servant and sailing industries. Approximately 33% of these workers died while in New Caledonia and around half of those who survived did not receive any payment for their toil. They were often not returned to their islands of origin and of those who were, about a third died in the first year of returning from poor health acquired from working in terrible conditions at New Caledonia. The labourers were subjected to inadequate food, poor shelter and harsh punishments whilst in New Caledonia. They could be imprisoned for not working to their employer's satisfaction, where the colonial government exploited them further as unpaid prison labour. They were also sold-on and transferred to other colonists upon the death or bankruptcy of their original employer. Well-known blackbirding vessels involved in the labour trade to New Caledonia were Aoba, Annette, Venus, Aurora, Ika Vuka, Idaho, Ambroua and Effie Meikle. Captains and recruiters notorious for kidnapping and blackbirding for the New Caledonia market included James Toutant Proctor, "Black Tom", Jean-Louis Villedieu, Martial Briault, Charles Peterson Stuart, Walter Champion, Gabriel Madezo and Captain H. McKenzie. The company Joubert & Carter run by Didier Numa Joubert and Douglas Carter owned many of the blackbirding vessels in the early years of trade. Recruiting to New Caledonia continued well into the 20th Century but at a much lower rate and less violent manner. It was only brought to an end in the 1930s with the approach of World War II.

== New Zealand ==
New Zealanders were involved in the trade in Australia and elsewhere in the Pacific. In 1863, Tasmanian Thomas McGrath, who had unsuccessfully been hunting whales along New Zealand's coast with his crew of Portuguese and Māori sailors, decided that blackbirding would be more profitable, and captured 144 Tongans from ʻAta to work on Peruvian plantations. That same year, Peruvian traders aboard the Rosa y Carmen abandoned blackbirded labourers on Rangitāhua, after finding their home country had outlawed the practice during their voyage.

From the late 1860s, blackbirding ships such as the Danzig, Lismore, and Wainui sailed across the Pacific from Dunedin. In September 1871, the Wainui — owned and sometimes captained by Port Chalmers town councillor Charles Clark — reportedly ran down canoes that were approaching the vessel with goods near Nukapu, "rescuing" many of the islanders, only to forcibly transport them to Fiji afterwards.

One group of labourers is known to have been brought to work in New Zealand. On 20 May 1870, the clipper schooner Lulu docked at Waitematā Harbour with 27 labourers from Efate in Vanuatu, brought to work at a flax mill in Auckland. The flax mill owners paid £4 for each worker. The men said they had come voluntarily, but there were suspicions that they had been sold by their chiefs. The government was questioned about the labourers' situation and an inquiry was held. The men said they had been treated well but had been misled about the length of the contract. About 12 of the men returned home on the Colonist in 1873.

Articles and letters in New Zealand newspapers, including The Daily Southern Cross and the Otago Daily Times, criticised the use and exploitation of the South Sea Islanders, which they likened to the Atlantic slave trade, and said the trade would threaten the economy. New Zealand attempted to regulate blackbirding, including New Zealanders' involvement in the wider trade in Australia and the Pacific Islands, through new laws and regulations in 1872 and 1874.

== Sāmoa ==
In the late 1850s, German merchant Johann Cesar VI. Godeffroy established J.C. Godeffroy & Sohn at Apia on the island of Upolu in Sāmoa, obtaining 100,000 acres of land from the indigenous population, including by selling firearms and exacerbating factional conflict during times of unrest. By 1872, J.C. Godeffroy & Sohn required cheap labour to work their expanding cotton and other agricultural plantations, while German blackbirding operations were expanding. After initially utilising people from Niue, the company sent labour vessels to the Gilbert Islands and the Nomoi Islands, exploiting food shortages there to recruit numerous people for their Samoan plantations. Men, women and children of all ages were taken, separated and sent to work in harsh conditions with many succumbing to illness and poor diet.

In 1880, the company changed its name to Deutsche Handels und Plantagen Gesellschaft (DHPG) and further expanded its Samoan plantations, recruiting from New Britain, New Ireland and the Solomon Islands. The German blackbirding vessel Upolu became well known in the area and was involved in several conflicts with islanders while recruiting. Imported Chinese workers eventually became more favourable but labour recruiting from Melanesian islands continued until at least the transfer of power from the Germans to New Zealand at the start of World War I.

Large British and American plantations also exploited blackbirded labour in colonial Samoa, such as the W & A McArthur Company (Anglo-Australian) and recruiting vessels such as Ubea, Florida and Maria. In 1880, the crew of the British ship Mary Anderson was involved in shooting recruits on board, while in 1894 Aele was involved in recruiting starving Gilbert Islanders.

== The Americas ==
=== Mexico and Guatemala ===
In the late 1880s, a worldwide boom in coffee demand fuelled the expansion of coffee growing in southwest Mexico and neighbouring Guatemala, resulting in local labour shortages for the European plantation owners. William Forsyth, an Englishman with expert knowledge on tropical plantations, promoted a scheme of recruiting people from the Gilbert Islands to work in Mexico and Guatemala. Approximately 1,200 Gilbert Islanders were recruited in three shiploads for the Mexican and Guatemalan coffee plantations. Only 250 survived, most of these being returned to their homeland in two voyages in 1896 and 1908. This represented a mortality rate of 80%.

In 1890, Captain Luttrell of the vessel Helen W. Almy recruited 300 Gilbert Islanders to work at a coffee plantation near Tapachula, owned by an American named John Magee. By 1894, despite supposedly having a three-year contract, none had been returned home and only 58 were still living. In 1891, the barque Tahiti, under command of Captain Ferguson, was commissioned to bring 370 Gilbert Islanders to Tapachula, including about 100 children. While bringing its human cargo to the Americas, Tahiti suffered storm damage and was forced to anchor in Drakes Bay, north of San Francisco. Amid accusations of slavery and blackbirding, Ferguson transferred command of the ship to another officer and abandoned the islanders in what amounted to a floating prison. Repairs were delayed for months and in early 1892, Tahiti was found capsized with all but a few survivors drowned.

Ferguson was again employed – this time as recruiter not as captain – aboard the Montserrat, bringing 470 Gilbert Islanders to work on coffee plantations in Guatemala. A journalist aboard Montserrat described the recruiting of islanders as clear slavery and even though Royal Navy officers had boarded the vessel for inspection, an understanding existed whereby the authorities intentionally refused to detain the crew of Montserrat. The islanders were sold for $100 each and forcibly marched 70 miles to the plantations in the highlands. Overwork and disease killed around 200 of them.

=== Peru ===
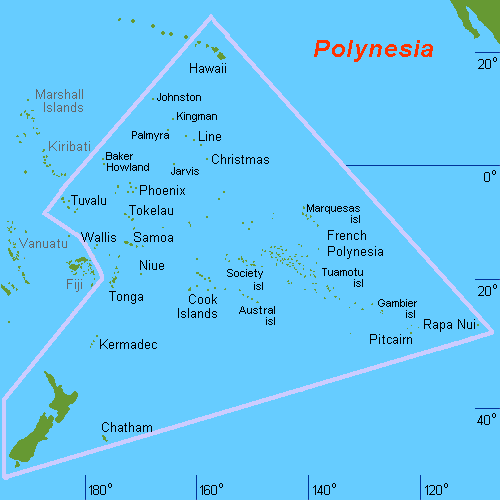
Geographic definition of Polynesia, surrounded by a light pink line

For several months between 1862 and 1863, crews on Peruvian ships combed the islands of Polynesia, from Easter Island in the eastern Pacific to the Gilbert Islands (now Kiribati) in the west, seeking workers to fill an extreme labour shortage in Peru. Joseph Charles Byrne, an Irish speculator, received financial backing to import South Sea Islanders as indentured workers. Byrne's ship, Adelante, set forth across the Pacific and at Tongareva in the Northern Cook Islands he was able to acquire 253 recruits of which more than half were women and children. Adelante returned to the Peruvian port of Callao where the human cargo were sold off and sent to work as plantation labourers and domestic servants. A considerable profit was made by the scheme's financiers and almost immediately other speculators and ship owners set out to make money on Polynesian labour.

==== Easter Island mass-kidnapping ====
At the end of 1862, eight Peruvian ships organised under Captain Marutani of the Rosa y Carmen (identified with the Catalan seafarer Joan Maristany i Galceran, born in El Masnou, "Marutani" being the name recorded in British records) conducted an armed operation at Easter Island where, over several days, the combined crews systematically surrounded villages and captured as many of the Rapa Nui islanders as possible. In these raids and others like them that occurred at Easter Island during this period, a third of the island's population (1407 people) were taken for the Peruvian labour trade. In the following months, Rosa y Carmen together with about 30 other vessels involved in recruiting for Peru, kidnapped or deceptively obtained people throughout Polynesia. Captain Marutani's vessel alone took people from Niue, Sāmoa and Tokelau, as well as those that he kidnapped from Easter Island.

==== 'Ata mass-kidnapping ====
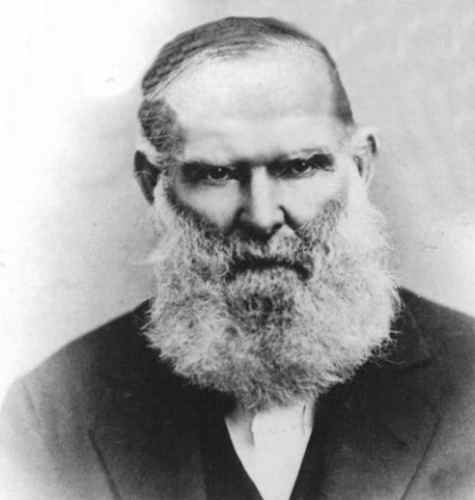
Captain T.J. McGrath, master of Grecian

In June 1863, about 350 people were living on ʻAta, an atoll in Tonga. Captain Thomas James McGrath of the Tasmanian whaler Grecian, having decided that the new slave trade was more profitable than whaling, went to the atoll and invited the islanders on board for trading. Once almost half the population was on board, he ordered the ship's compartments locked, and the ship departed. These 144 people never returned to their homes.

Grecian met with a Peruvian slave vessel, General Prim, and the islanders were transferred to this ship and transported to Callao. Due to new government regulations in Peru against the blackbirding trade, the islanders were not allowed to disembark and remained aboard for many weeks while their repatriation was organised. On 2 October 1863, after many of the imprisoned 'Ata people had died or were dying from neglect and disease, a vessel was organised to take them back; this ship dumped the Tongans on uninhabited Cocos Island. A month later the Peruvian warship Tumbes went to rescue the remaining 38 survivors and took them to the Peruvian port of Paita, where they probably died.

==== Deception at Tuvalu ====
The Rev. A. W. Murray, the earliest European missionary in Tuvalu, described the practices of blackbirders in the Ellice Islands. He said they promised islanders that they would be taught about God while working in coconut oil production, but the slavers' intended destination was the Chincha Islands in Peru. Rev. Murray reported that in 1863, about 180 people were taken from Funafuti and about 200 were taken from Nukulaelae, leaving fewer than 100 of the 300 recorded in 1861 as living on Nukulaelae. On Funafuti and Nukulaelae, the resident traders facilitated the recruiting of the islanders by the "blackbirders".

==== Mortality ====
The Peruvian labour trade in Polynesians only lasted from 1862 to 1863, during which an estimated 3,634 Polynesians were recruited, and 93% of them perished. Over 2,000 died from disease, starvation or neglect either aboard the blackbirding ships or at their destinations. The Peruvian government shut down the operation in 1863 and ordered the repatriation of those who survived. A smallpox and dysentery outbreak in Peru accompanied this operation, resulting in the death of a further 1,030 Polynesian labourers. Some of the islanders survived long enough to bring these contagious diseases to their home islands, causing local epidemics and additional mortality. By 1866, only around 250 of those recruited had survived, with about 100 of these remaining in Peru.

== Representation in popular culture ==
American author Jack London recounted in his memoir, The Cruise of the Snark (1907), an incident at Langa Langa Lagoon Malaita, Solomon Islands, when the local islanders attacked a "recruiting" ship:

... still bore the tomahawk marks where the Malaitans at Langa Langa several months before broke in for the trove of rifles and ammunition locked therein, after bloodily slaughtering Jansen's predecessor, Captain Mackenzie. The burning of the vessel was somehow prevented by the black crew, but this was so unprecedented that the owner feared some complicity between them and the attacking party. However, it could not be proved, and we sailed with the majority of this same crew. The present skipper smilingly warned us that the same tribe still required two more heads from the Minota, to square up for deaths on the Ysabel plantation.

Georges Baudoux's Jean M'Baraï the Trepang Fisherman, a semi-fictional novella, relates the brutal history of the Kanaka trade and highlights 19th century imperial connections between the French and British Pacific. Translated from the original French by Karin Speedy in 2015, it offers a French/New Caledonian perspective on blackbirding in the Pacific, first published in 1919.

Artist Jasmine Togo-Brisby makes art about blackbirding. She is a fourth-generation descendant of slaves who were kidnapped from Vanuatu in 1863. She is currently based in New Zealand, her exhibitions include Bitter Sweet at Te Uru in 2016, and Birds of Passage at the Dunedin School of Art gallery in 2019.

== See also ==
- Indian indenture system
- Atlantic slave trade
- European enslavement of Indigenous Americans
- Reverse Underground Railroad, sometimes known as "blackbirding"
- Roundup (history)
- Shanghaiing
- Kafala
- Savage Islands (film)
- Genocide of Indigenous Australians

== Bibliography ==
- Affeldt, Stefanie. (2014). Consuming Whiteness. Australian Racism and the 'White Sugar' Campaign. Berlin [et al.]: Lit. ISBN 978-3-643-90569-7.
- Corris, Peter. (1973). Passage, Port and Plantation: A History of the Solomon Islands Labour Migration, 1870–1914. Melbourne, Australia: Melbourne University Press. ISBN 978-0-522-84050-6.
- Docker, E. W. (1981). The Blackbirders: A Brutal Story of the Kanaka Slave-Trade. London: Angus & Robertson. ISBN 0-207-14069-3
- Gravelle, Kim. (1979). A History of Fiji. Suva: Fiji Times Limited.
- Horne, Gerald. (2007). The White Pacific: US Imperialism and Black Slavery in the South Seas after the Civil War. Honolulu: University of Hawai'i Press. ISBN 978-0-8248-3147-9
- Maude, H. E. (1981). Slavers in Paradise: The Peruvian Slave Trade in Polynesia, 1862–1864 Fiji: Institute of Pacific Studies. ASIN B01HC0W8FU
- Shineberg, Dorothy (1999) The People Trade: Pacific Island Labourers and New Caledonia, 1865–1930 (Pacific Islands Monographs Series) ISBN 978-0824821777
- "E. V. Stevens (23 March 1950). "A brief history of the South Sea Islands Labour Traffic and the vessels engaged in it. (Paper read at the meeting of the Historical Society of Queensland, Inc.)" (PDF). The University of Queensland.
