= Robert Towns =

Australian politician

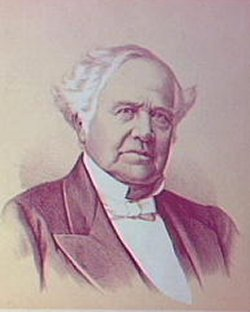
- Robert Towns, by unknown artist
- Born: 10 November 1794; Longhorsley, Northumberland, England
- Died: 11 April 1873 (aged 78); Sydney, New South Wales, Australia
- Burial place: Balmain Cemetery
- Occupations: Mariner, merchant and politician
- Known for: Founder of Townsville, Queensland

Robert Towns (10 November 1794 – 11 April 1873) was an English master mariner who settled in Australia as a businessman, sandalwood merchant, colonist, shipowner, pastoralist, politician, whaler and civic leader. He was the founder of Townsville, Queensland and named it after himself. He is also known for his involvement in blackbirding and labour exploitation of immigrant workers.

After a career at sea as a master mariner based in Britain, Towns came to Australia in 1843 as the agent for London merchant Robert Brooks (MP). He also became a merchant in his own right in Sydney with involvement in the sandalwood and pelagic whaling trades. He was an importer of sugar and tea, and an exporter of wool, whale oil, cotton and other commodities. He became a pastoralist and pioneered the cultivation of cotton in Queensland, often employing Kanakas.

The head office of Robert Towns & Company was in Sydney with branch offices in Melbourne, Brisbane, Dunedin and Townsville. His far-flung trading connections saw him do business with merchants in Mauritius, India, Ceylon (Sri Lanka), the Dutch East Indies (Indonesia), the Philippines, New Zealand, New Caledonia, China, the New Hebrides (Vanuatu), California and Chile.

== Biography ==
=== Early life ===
Robert Towns was born at Longhorsley, Northumberland, England, on the Tenth of November 1794. He attended the village school and went to sea in 1809 as an apprentice on a North Shields collier. He was a mate by the age of 17, and a master on a brig in the Mediterranean two years later. He travelled to Australia for the first time as the captain of Boa Vista in 1827. He was a regular trader to Australia by the time he arrived in command of the Brothers (325 tons) in August 1832.

In 1838 he took command of Royal Saxon for London shipowner, merchant and banker Robert Brooks. Towns was also part-owner of the vessel. During the First Opium War (1839–1842) he broke the British blockade of Canton and took aboard a cargo of tea "at the highest freight rates yet seen in British private trade." On his return to London he was asked to go to Australia to put in order the affairs of Brooks’ agent in Sydney, Ranulph Dacre.

=== New South Wales ===
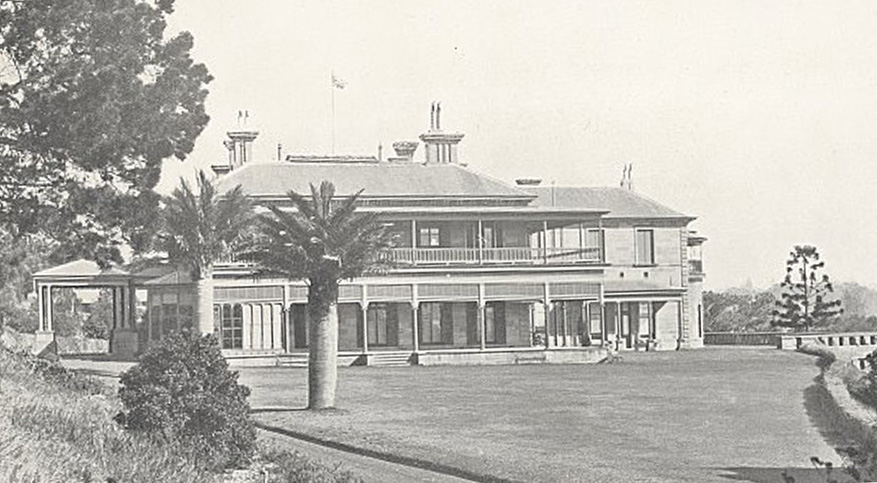
Cranbrook House in 1917, home of Robert Towns 1864 to 1873

Towns reached Port Jackson in March 1843, and took charge of the Sydney agency of Robert Brooks & Co. He was joined by his wife and son the following year. He already had strong ties in Sydney. Apart from almost annual voyages to the colony in the preceding fifteen years, on 28 December 1833 he had married Sophia Wentworth, a sister of explorer and politician William Charles Wentworth, at St Philip's Church, Sydney; the couple honeymooned at her brother's estate at Toongabbie.

In 1843 he established Robert Towns & Co., General Merchants, Ship and Commission Agents, at Sydney. An early investment was the purchase of the Elizabeth (174 tons) in 1843. She had been built in 1816 and the purchase of old vessels like her became a feature of his shipowning. In 1855 he took into the partnership (later Sir) Alexander Stuart. By 1857 the firm had made profits of £245,000.

The depressed colonial economy of the early 1840s, and his ready access to credit, allowed Towns to quickly become established as a leading figure in the shipping industry. He purchased eight vessels and also a well-located wharf at Millar's Point, Darling Harbour, that soon became known as Towns' Wharf. The vessels were put to work in the sandalwood trade, as pelagic whalers and as trading vessels. His standing in the Sydney commercial circles saw him invited to join the board of the Bank of New South Wales in 1850.

Towns entry into the sandalwood trade began with a stroke of good fortune. His vessel Elizabeth returned to Sydney on 29 June 1845 from Tanna with 100 tons of sandalwood. It was sent to China where it arrived at a time of high prices of almost £50 a ton for a commodity the gathering of which by the natives at Eromanga had been paid for with old hoop-iron, axes and assorted ironmongery. Later in the 1840s he began to establish trading posts on the islands of the Pacific to gather sandalwood, beche-de-mer and coconut oil for collection by his island trading vessels. Trading posts were established at New Caledonia (in 1847), the Isle of Pines (1848) and at Aneityum (1853).

=== Search for cheap labour ===
Towns had trouble finding men to work in his various enterprises, as did other employers in New South Wales. A Coolie Immigration Society was established in Sydney in September 1842 to lobby the government to remove restrictions on importing labourers from India. The ship Orwell arrived in Sydney 23 March 1846 with 56 male and 13 female “coolies”, recruited for Robert Towns in Calcutta, supposedly to work as “domestic servants”. On the voyage out they had to work the pumps of the leaky ship day and night. They were given insufficient food and little warm clothing and all of them became unwell and one died soon after arrival. In Sydney the men were put to work on Towns wharf but they stopped work after a few days. They said their food was inadequate and the terms of their employment had never been made clear to them.

Three hundred Chinese labourers were landed from Towns' ship Royal Saxon in 1853 to help meet the labour shortage caused by the Australian Gold Rushes but he found it difficult to place them with other employers. Towns was the leading figure in the trade and had brought in 2,400 Chinese by 1854 as well as 86 Indian workers. He tried to import Chinese and Indian labourers to work on his cotton plantation in Queensland but was frustrated by British government emigration agents in India and Hong Kong.

The South Sea islanders who served as seamen on Towns' sandalwood vessels and pelagic whaling ships performed well and may have prompted him to import large numbers of them into Australia to work on his pastoral properties and cotton plantation in Queensland. Towns worked with recruiters to bring the islanders to Australia, including Henry Ross Lewin, a notorious blackbirder of South Sea Islander labour. Unscrupulous methods and kidnapping were commonly used to get labourers aboard their ships. Allegations of crimes such as kidnap and slavery were frequently levelled at Towns during this period, who responded with the publication of a pamphlet outlining the instructions he gave to Ross-Lewin in regards to recruitment of the labourers. This pamphlet was later criticised for possibly being written after voyage and for the conditions specified for the labourers not being met in that shelter was not provided, wages not paid and the Islanders not returned home.

=== Whaling from Sydney ===
Towns was a major figure in whaling in Australia during the mid 19th century. He thought the close proximity of Port Jackson to the whaling grounds of the western Pacific made it a "legitimate" enterprise for maritime entrepreneurs based in Sydney. The "lottery aspect" of the industry he felt could be eliminated with a sufficient number of vessels and so he tried to have a fleet of a dozen deep-sea whalers operating at any one time. All told he owned, or part-owned, 24 Sydney whaling vessels at various times. These made 127 voyages from Port Jackson between 1841 and 1878. This was in spite of the fact he arrived late on the scene, the industry having peaked in the 1830s.

His strategy was to purchase old and inexpensive vessels and crew them with South Sea islanders who were more tractable and prepared to work on the "lay" or share system of payment. He chose experienced and capable masters to command these vessels and keep them at sea in the face of the manifold difficulties routinely experienced on their long and demanding voyages. It was sometimes hard to get insurance for his aged vessels, eight of which were lost at sea. Crews were difficult to find at times, especially during the gold rush period in the 1850s, forcing him to send his ships to Hobart or the South Sea islands for men. In spite of the challenges, and the disapproval of his business partners, he persisted through into the 1860s and 1870s when, almost single-handed, he kept the whaling trade alive from Sydney.

=== Civic leader ===
Towns was a member of the initial New South Wales Legislative Council from 22 May 1856 to 10 May 1861 (a 5-year appointment, terminated by his resignation in support of the council president) and then re-appointed for life on 23 June 1863, terminating at his death on 11 April 1873.

He was a member and president of the Sydney Chamber of Commerce, a member of the Pilot Board, on the committee of the Sydney Bethel Union and one of the founding councillors of the Sydney Sailors' Home. At the opening of the latter institution in 1865 Towns claimed to be the, “father of the tars in the colony, having commenced his career in 1809.” He was also a supporter and promoter of trans-Pacific steam navigation.

He lived from 1864 to 1873 in Cranbrook House on New South Head Road in Rose Bay, Sydney.

=== Queensland ===
A world-wide shortage of cotton, due to blockades of Confederate ports during the American Civil War, prompted the Queensland government to encourage the cultivation of cotton in the sub-tropical climate of the colony. Robert Towns was the first to take up this opportunity and brought in indentured Pacific Island labourers to work on his cotton plantation of Townsvale near Brisbane in 1863. Towns actively promoted this remedy to the labour shortage in rural Queensland in a pamphlet published in 1864. One of Towns' vessels, the Don Juan under the command of Captain Grueber and labour recruiter Henry Ross Lewin, brought 73 South Sea Islanders to the port of Brisbane in August 1863. Towns specifically wanted adolescent males recruited and, although Towns denied the accusations, kidnapping was reportedly employed in obtaining these boys.

Between 1864 and 1904, an estimated 63,000 women and men came to Australia to work in the shipping and sugar industries. Many were poorly paid and endured harsh conditions. It has been alleged that those acting on behalf of Towns and others engaged in blackbirding, the practice of coercing and kidnapping labourers when they could not obtain workers to come voluntarily.

Towns organised expeditions that resulted in the gazetting of Townsville as the site of a new port. Towns organised the first importation of South Sea Islander labour to that port in 1866. They came aboard Blue Bell under Captain Edwards. Apart from a small amount of Melanesian labour imported for the beche-de-mer trade around Bowen, Towns was instrumental in bringing Polynesian labour to Queensland. Towns paid many workers "in goods" amounting to 10 shillings per month. One of his agents claimed that the labourers were "savages who did not know the use of money" and therefore did not deserve cash wages. This was despite the Polynesian Labourers Act of 1868 stipulating the workers should have been paid in coin.

Towns appears to have been involved in the first attempts to cultivate coffee in Australia. The story goes that Towns was privy to a plan by the government to grant title to land under cultivation. He procured a boat load of coffee beans, arranged for them to be planted on a substantial tract of land in the Townsville area and applied for the title to the land. The coffee crop failed because the beans had been roasted before Towns acquired them. However, this detail did not prevent Towns from succeeding in his efforts to acquire the land.

=== Later life ===
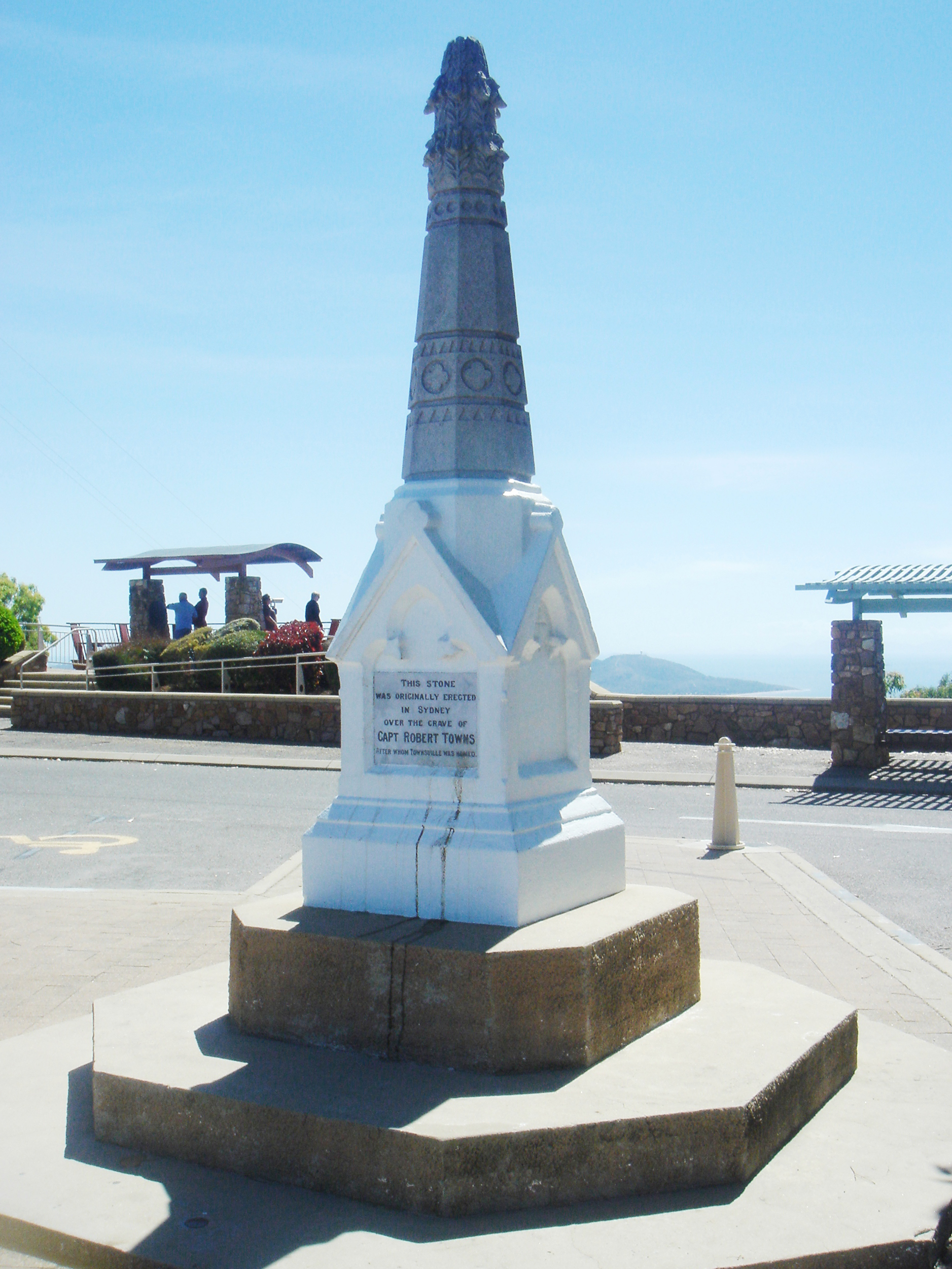
Robert Towns Monument atop Castle Hill, Townsville

In 1870, Robert Towns was attacked by paralysis and his health was precarious thereafter. He suffered a further stroke on 7 April 1873 and died at his home, Cranbrook, on 11 April 1873. He was buried on 15 April 1873 in the Balmain Cemetery.

== Legacy ==
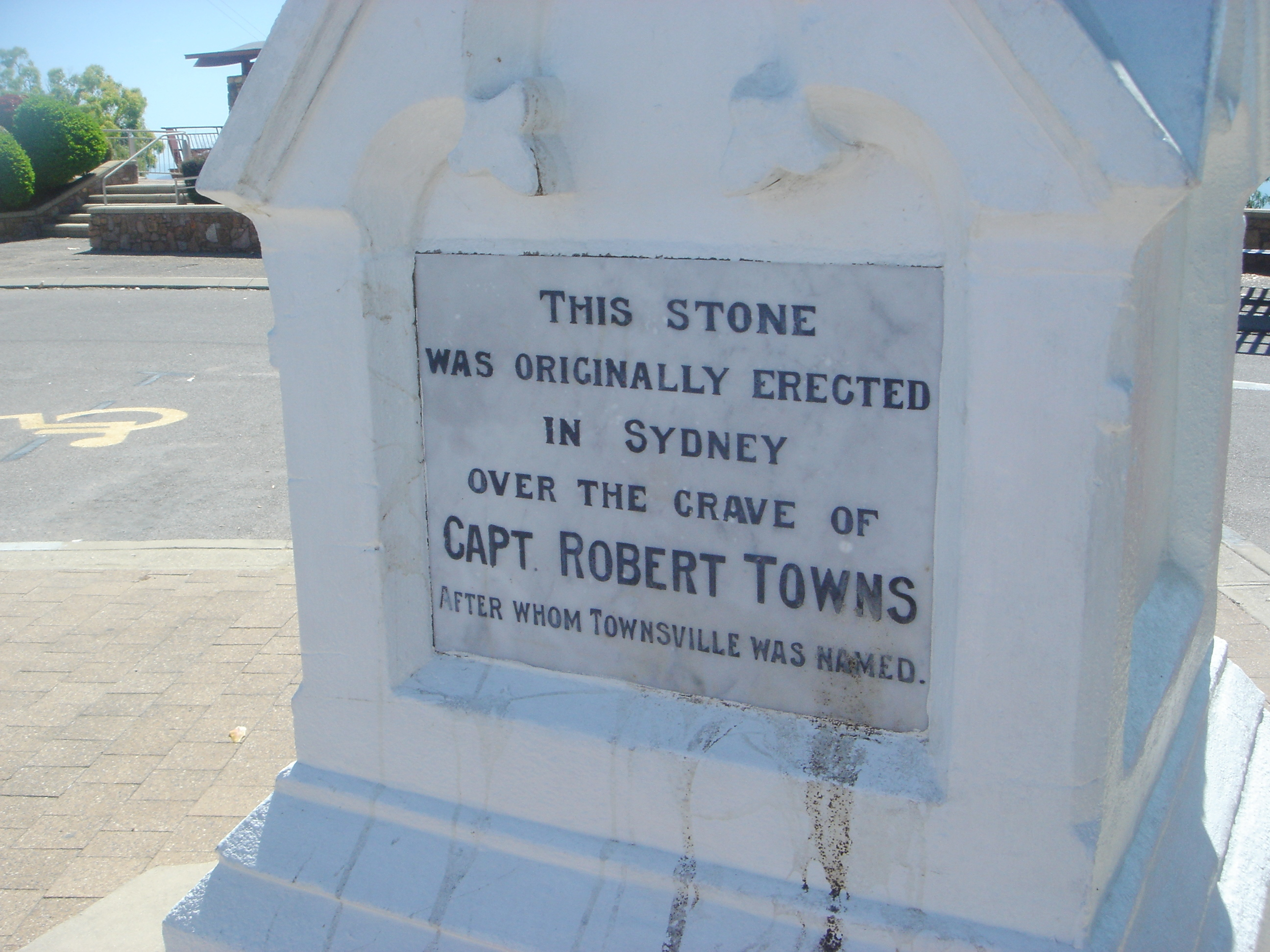
Robert Towns Gravestone, Detail of monument atop Castle Hill, Townsville

The Balmain Cemetery closed in 1912 and, in 1941, it was decided to convert it into parkland (the Pioneer's Memorial Park) and advertisements were placed for families to make arrangements for re-interment of bodies or removal of memorials. As a result, the memorial stone from Robert Towns' grave was relocated to stand atop a monument at Castle Hill, Townsville.

The pulpit of St Andrew's Cathedral was provided by Towns.

After a number of subsequent owners, his home Cranbrook House would become Cranbrook School.

On Sunday 1 November 1964, a monument commemorating the "100th Anniversary of Settlement in Townsville" was unveiled on The Strand in Townsville with particular mention made of four men: Robert Towns, Andrew Ball, Mark Watt Reid and John Melton Black. As at 2020, the monument is located in Anzac Memorial Park between the Centenary Fountain and the bandstand (19.2553°S 146.8230°E).

A statue of Towns is located on Pioneers Walk in Townsville. In June 2020 the hands of the statue were painted red, in an apparent protest against Towns being memorialised despite being involved with blackbirding.
