= William T. Wawn =

- Born: January 6, 1837; Boldon, County Durham, England
- Died: July 5, 1901 (aged 64); Sydney
- Cause of death: "blood poisoning" after an accident
- Burial place: Rookwood Cemetery
- Parents: John Twizell Wawn (father); Mary, née Matterson (mother)

William Twizell Wawn (1837–1901) was a British ship captain, author, and artist.

== Career ==
He worked at a York architect before serving in on ships trading to and from India. In 1861, He became a second mate; the following year he served as a first mate. In 1863, he travelled to New Zealand. In 1865, he returned to England to for education.

In January 1875, he returned to Sydney. That year, he began participating in the "island labour trade". He continued for the next two decades. In 1893, he authored The South Sea Islanders and the Queensland Labour Trade: A Record of Voyages and Experiences in the Western Pacific, from 1875 to 1891 An artist, he produced drawings of islanders and fish.
