= Pacific Island Labourers Act 1901 =

Australian legislation

Parliament of Australia
- Long title: An Act to provide for the Regulation, Restriction and Prohibition of the Introduction of Labourers from the Pacific Islands and for other purposes.
- Citation: No. 16 of 1901
- Royal assent: 17 December 1901
- Repealed: 1 June 1959

Amended by
- Pacific Island Labourers Act 1906

Repealed by
- Migration Act 1958

Related legislation
- Immigration Restriction Act 1901
- Status: Repealed

The Pacific Island Labourers Act 1901 (Cth) was an Act of the Parliament of Australia which was designed to facilitate the mass deportation of Pacific Islanders, or "Kanakas", working in Australia, especially in the Queensland sugar industry. Along with the Immigration Restriction Act 1901, enacted six days later, it formed an important part of the White Australia policy. In 1901, there were approximately 10,000 Pacific Islanders working in Australia, most in the sugar cane industry in Queensland and northern New South Wales, many working as indentured labourers or slaves, even with slavery being prohibited in Australia and the rest of the British Empire through the Slavery Abolition Act 1833. The Act ultimately resulted in the deportation of approximately 7,500 Pacific Islanders.

== Background ==
Beginning in the 1860s, tens of thousands of Pacific Islanders were brought to Australia as unpaid or low-paid labourers. By the early 1890s, 46,000 labourers had arrived in Queensland, and up to 62,000 such labourers arrived in all. Many of these people had been forcibly removed from their homes, in a process called "blackbirding", by which Islanders were either kidnapped or deceived into traveling to Australia. They were brought in to meet the growing need for cheap labour in the sugar industry, since white labour was scarce and expensive. The majority of such labourers were employed under indentured labour arrangements, whereby they received either no pay or extremely small amounts of pay. By 1880, Queensland legislation prevented Pacific Islanders from working in higher paid jobs in sugar mills and other industrial areas, and limited them to manual agricultural labour.

== The act ==
The act prohibited any Pacific Islanders from entering Australia after 31 March 1904, and required all those entering before then to have a licence. During 1902, the maximum number of licences that could be issued was limited to three-quarters of the number of Pacific Islanders who left Australia in 1901. During 1903, this licence quota was lowered even further, to half of the total departures in 1902. Any person who brought a Pacific Islander into the country contrary to the Act could be fined £100. It was an offence to employ a Pacific Islander in any other way than an indentured labour agreement, punishable by a fine of £100.

The most forcible component of the legislation was section 8. It provided that any Pacific Islander found in Australia after 31 December 1906 could be deported immediately by order of the Minister for External Affairs, and any Islander found in Australia before that date, who had not been employed under an indentured labour agreement at any time in the preceding month, could be deported immediately by order of a Magistrate in summary proceedings.

Section 7 provided all labour agreements made with Pacific Islander labourers no longer remained in force from 31 December 1906. The practical effect of the legislation was that by this date, Pacific Islanders were legally barred from undertaking labour contracts in Australia and ultimately compelled to return to their country of origin.

There were various grounds for exemption from deportation, including marriage to an Australian. The case of Robtelmes v Brenan (1906) 4 CLR 395, the first deportation case to come before the High Court of Australia, provides an illustration of the Act's operation.

== See also ==
- White Australia policy
- Blackbirding
