= South Sea Islanders =

Australian descendants of Pacific Islanders

South Sea Islanders in Australia
- Flag of the South Sea Islanders

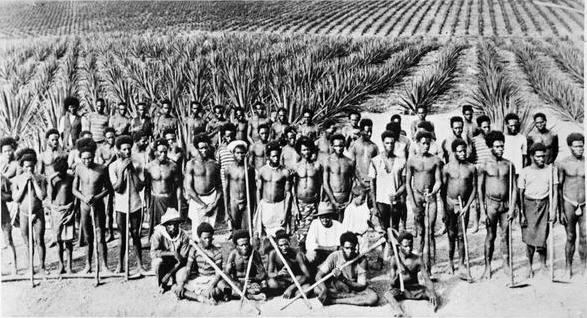
- South Sea Islander labourers on a Queensland pineapple plantation, 1890s

Total population
- 7,228 (by reported ancestry, 2021 census) c. 20,000 (2022 estimate)

Regions with significant populations
- Mackay, QLD: 846 (2021 census); 5,000 (2021 estimate)
- Brisbane, QLD: 619 (2021)
- Rockhampton, QLD: 533 (2021)
- Townsville, QLD: 399 (2021)
- Cairns, QLD: 308 (2021)
- Moreton Bay, QLD: 283 (2021)
- Logan, QLD: 248 (2021)
- Tweed, NSW: 219 (2021)
- Whitsundays, QLD: 203 (2021)
- Livingstone, QLD: 177 (2021)
- Fraser Coast, QLD: 170 (2021)
- Gold Coast, QLD: 170 (2021)
- Bundaberg, QLD: 157 (2021)
- Sunshine Coast, QLD: 153 (2021)
- Gladstone, QLD: 143 (2021)
- Ipswich, QLD: 132 (2021)
- Burdekin, QLD: 114 (2021)
- Cassowary Coast, QLD: 112 (2021)
- Redland, QLD: 82 (2021)
- Yarrabah, QLD: 77 (2021)

Languages
- Australian English • Bislama • Pijin

Related ethnic groups
- Melanesians • Micronesians • Polynesians

South Sea Islanders, also known as Australian South Sea Islanders (ASSI) and formerly referred to as Kanakas, are the Australian descendants of Pacific Islanders from more than 80 islands – including the Oceanian archipelagoes of the Solomon Islands, New Caledonia, Vanuatu, Fiji, the Gilbert Islands, and New Ireland – who were recruited between the mid-to-late 19th century as labourers in the sugarcane fields of Queensland. Some were kidnapped or tricked (or "blackbirded") into long-term indentured servitude or slavery, despite the Slave Trade Act 1807 and the Slavery Abolition Act 1833 outlawing slavery in Australia and the rest of the British Empire. At its height, the recruiting accounted for over half the adult male population of some islands.

Today, the majority of South Sea Islanders are also Aboriginal Australians or Torres Strait Islanders. As of the 2021 census, there were 7,228 people who claimed South Sea Islander ancestry in Australia, 5,562 of whom lived in Queensland. However, this is lower than the actual number of people with South Sea Islander heritage, with the true number estimated to be as high as 20,000 in Queensland alone as of 2022. The largest South Sea Islanders community is in the city of Mackay, where approximately 5,000 South Sea Islanders reside (approximately 5.93% of Mackay's population).

== History ==
Under the Polynesian Labourers Act 1868 (Qld), recruited labour was indentured for three years in exchange for a small wage of £6 per year as well as rations, accommodation and clothing. Employers were required to deposit their employees’ wages into a Government Savings Bank account.

The majority were repatriated by the Australian Government in the period between 1906 and 1908 under the Pacific Island Labourers Act 1901, a piece of legislation related to the White Australia policy. There was resistance to repatriation, and controversy regarding the manner in which it was done.

Those exempted from repatriation, along with a number of others who escaped deportation, remained in Australia to form the basis of what is today Australia's largest non-indigenous black ethnic group. Today, the descendants of those who remained are officially referred to as South Sea Islanders. A 1992 census of South Sea Islanders reported around 10,000 descendants living in Queensland. Fewer than 3,500 were reported in the 2001 Australian census.

The question of how many Islanders were "blackbirded" is unknown and remains controversial. The extent to which Islanders were recruited legally, persuaded, deceived, coerced or forced to leave their homes and travel to Queensland is difficult to evaluate and also controversial. Official documents and accounts from the period often conflict with the oral tradition passed down to the descendants of workers. Stories of blatantly violent kidnapping tend to relate to the first ten or so years of the trade.

With time, owing to intermarriage, many Australian South Sea Islanders also claim a mixed ancestry, including Aboriginal and Torres Strait Islander people, along with immigrants from the South Pacific Islands and European Australians.

== Terminology ==
Blackbirded and recruited islanders were generally referred to as Kanakas (from the Hawaiian word kānaka meaning "man"). However many Islander descendants now regard the term as pejorative and an insulting reminder of their ancestors' exploitation at the hands of the British and the white Australians, and it is now regarded in Australian English as an offensive term.

== Prominent Australian South Sea Islanders ==
=== Activism and politics ===
In recent generations, facing many similar forms of discrimination in Australia as Aboriginal Australians and Torres Strait Islanders, Australian South Sea Islanders have been prominent figures in civil rights and politics. Faith Bandler, Evelyn Scott, and Bonita Mabo (widow of Eddie Mabo) are prominent Indigenous activists who are also descendants of South Sea Island plantation workers.

Stephen Andrew, who represented Pauline Hanson's One Nation (PHON) and Katter's Australian Party (KAP) in the Queensland Parliament, was the first South Sea Islander to be elected to parliament, having won the seat of Mirani for One Nation in 2017 and 2020 before being defeated as a KAP member in 2024.

Federal Liberal National MP Terry Young, who has represented the seat of Longman since 2019, was of South Sea Islander descent through his grandfather.

=== Sport ===
Another area Australian South Sea Islanders have excelled in is sport, especially the game of rugby league. Australian international representatives Sam Backo, Mal Meninga, Gorden Tallis and Wendell Sailor are all members of the Australian South Sea Islander community.

=== Other people ===
Gail Mabo, daughter of Bonita and Eddie Mabo, is a prominent visual artist.

== Recognition and documentation ==
For many years, Queensland's South Sea Islander communities sought acknowledgement for past treatment, and recognition as a distinct cultural group. After decades of community advocacy, the Commonwealth Government finally recognised that distinction on August 25, 1994. State Library of Queensland holds several collections pertaining to the history of Australian South Sea Islanders in Queensland, two significant collections pertain to their long fight for recognition.

The Australian South Sea Islanders United Council Records 1975–2008, 2021 (Acc. 28617) includes documents, research papers, photographs, recorded interviews and other material relating to the work of the Australian South Sea Islanders United Council (ASSIUC) from the mid 1970s. Formed by a group of first descendants at Tweed Heads in 1975, the ASSIUC was the first national body to represent Australian South Sea Islanders, advocating for national recognition and promoting cultural awareness. A second iteration of the ASSIUC was re-registered in Townsville in 1991 and grew to fourteen branches including two in New South Wales. This body was instrumental in bringing communities together and advocating for change.

The Australian South Sea Islanders 150 Commemoration and Festival 2013 Papers (Acc. 29744) also include documents such as meeting minutes and correspondence relating to the Australian South Sea Islanders Secretariat Inc., and photographs and interviews conducted by Nic Maclellan on 13 August 2013 at the Australian South Sea Islander 150th Anniversary event at Ormiston House, Brisbane.

== See also ==
- White Australia Policy
- Kanaka (Pacific Island worker)
- Blackbirding
