= Richard Parkinson (explorer) =

Danish explorer and anthropologist (1844–1909)

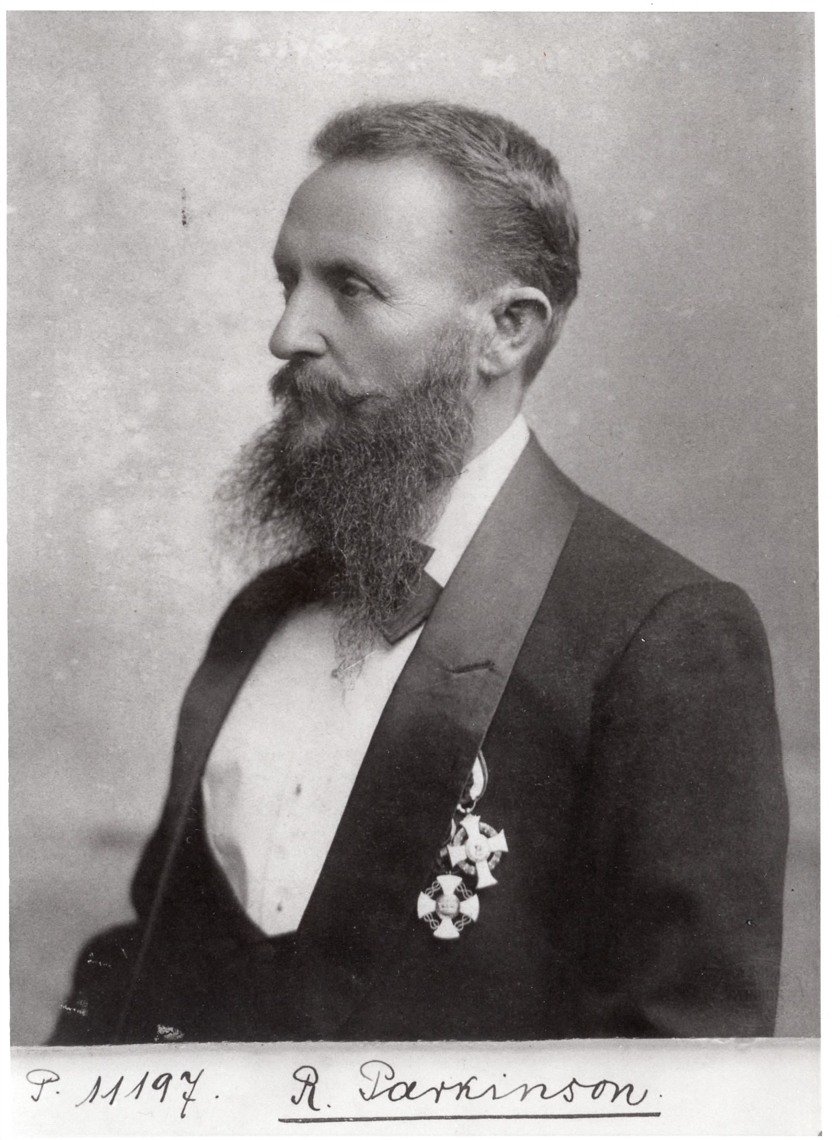
Richard Parkinson

Richard Parkinson (1844, Augustenburg, Denmark – 1909, New Britain, Papua New Guinea), full name Richard Heinrich Robert Parkinson, was a Danish explorer and anthropologist of German origin.

== Career ==
In 1875, he became a representative of the Hamburg trading firm J. C Godeffroy & Sohn in Samoa. He was, in part, employed to collect ethnographic material for the Godeffroy Museum. He remained in Samoa until 1882, settling afterwards on the Gazelle Peninsula, New Britain, German New Guinea. From there he undertook larger and smaller journeys to the Bismarck Archipelago, then the Solomon Islands and New Guinea, at that time all parts of the German colonial empire. He also collected zoological specimens, especially insects.

In the later 1890er years Parkinson began to sell parts of his collections to German museums, mainly in Dresden and Stuttgart. For this activities he was awarded the Albert Order and the Friedrich Order.

Although also the remaining collection might have brought him further government awards, Parkinson wanted to sell due to his deteriorating health. He offered about 1,500 artifacts to various German museums for 10,000 marks. Although this was a reasonable sum for such a collection, the German museums expressed no interest, so that the Field Museum of Natural History in Chicago was ultimately awarded the contract for almost 3,000 objects belonging to Richard and his wife Phebe Parkinson.

== Thirty Years in the South Seas ==
His masterwork Dreißig Jahre in der Südsee, (Thirty Years in the South Seas), appeared in several editions first in 1907 and again in 1911. It describes in detail the islands, Neulauenburg (Duke of York Islands), Neumecklenburg and New Hanover, St. Matthias Islands, the Admiralty Islands and Micronesian outliers in the Bismarck Sea, the German Solomon Islands, their societies, masks and mask dances, legends and fairy tales as well as the languages.

== Works ==
- Im Bismarckarchipel. Leipzig: Brockhaus 1887 (Repr. 2006 im Verlag Fines Mundi, Saarbrücken)
- Dreißig Jahre in der Südsee. Land und Leute, Sitten und Gebräuche im Bismarckarchipel und auf den deutschen Salomoinseln. Herausgegeben von Dr. B. Ankermann, Direktorial-Assistent am königlichen Museum für Völkerkunde zu Berlin. Strecker & Schröder, Stuttgart 1907 (Neuausgabe ebd. 1911; 2. Auflage bearbeitet und herausgegeben von Prof. Dr. August Eichhorn, ebd. 1926)
- Aberglaube und Zauberwesen der Südseeinsulaner. Ensslin & Laiblin, Reutlingen [1932]
