= Johann Schmeltz =

German ethnographer and naturalist

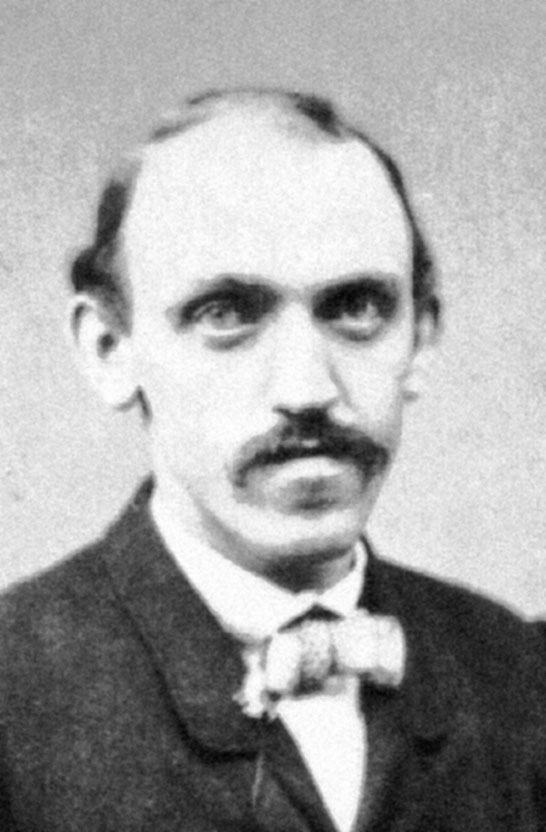
Johannes Schmeltz

Johannes Dietrich Eduard Schmeltz (19 May 1839 – 26 May 1909) was a German ethnographer and naturalist.

Schmeltz had no formal scientific training but studied with many well established Hamburg naturalists including Georg Semper, Otto Semper, Carl Friedrich August Alexander Crüger and Johann Georg Christian Lehmann. A keen lepidopterist he corresponded with Philipp Christoph Zeller. In 1863 Schmeltz became "Kustos" or senior curator of the Museum Godeffroy in Hamburg, which specialised in the natural history and ethnography of the South Seas. The museum was described in Dutch, Danish, German, English, and Austrian scientific journals as one of the best collections of its kind. His main business was to transfer all the natural and ethnographic material, which had been collected, to the accordant university departments for identification. After being sent back he had to fill it into the collection. He remained in this post after suspension of payment of J. C Godeffroy & Sohn in December 1879. In 1885 all inventory has to be sold as the whole quarter, where the museum had been located, would break down for new buildings. By then an authority on the ethnography of the Pacific islands he left Hamburg in 1882 to become the conservator of the Rijks Ethnographisch Museum in Leiden. He was director of the museum from 1897 to 1909.

Schmeltz was one of the founders and editor of Internationales Archiv für Ethnographie (Rijksmuseum voor Volkenkunde in Leiden, 1888-1968), an anthropological journal. Amongst the contributors and editorial panel were Otto Finsch and Rudolf Virchow and Edward Burnett Tylor. At this time he had the title "Doktor".

The correspondence of Johann Schmeltz (more than 3,000 letters, mainly from the period 1887-1900) is kept in Leiden University Library.

A species of Australian lizard, Carlia schmeltzii, is named in his honor.

== Works ==
One of Schmeltz' museum duties was to produce sales catalogues, since the museum was independent of the mercantile and shipping company J. C Godeffroy & Sohn. These were lists with descriptions of duplicate (Doubletten) natural history specimens and artifacts offered to private collectors or other museums. Some of the catalogues began with narratives of collecting expeditions and collecting details (Topographische und zoologische Notizen).

== The Catalogues ==
- year?' Catalog I der zum Verkauf stehenden Doubletten aus dem naturhistorischen Expeditionen der Herren Joh. Ces. Godeffroy & Sohn in Hamburg. Hamburg
- 1865 Catalog II der zum Verkauf stehenden Doubletten aus dem naturhistorischen Expeditionen der Herren Joh. Ces. Godeffroy & Sohn in Hamburg. Hamburg. iv + 33 pp.
- 1866 Catalog III der zum Verkauf stehenden Doubletten aus dem naturhistorischen Expeditionen der Herren Joh.Ces. Godeffroy & Sohn in Hamburg. Hamburg.iii + xii + 52 pp.
- 1869 Museum Godeffroy. Catalog IV, nebst einer Beiläge, enthaltend: topographische Notizen; Beschreibung neuer Bryozoen von Senator Dr. Kirchenpauer zu Hamburg und einer neuen Asteriden-Gattung von Dr.Chr. Lütken zu Kopenhagen. Wilhelm Mauke Söhn Perthes-Besser & Mauke, Hamburg xxxix + iii + 139 + 2 pp.
- 1874 Museum Godeffroy. Catalog V. Nebst einer Beiläge enthaltend topographische und zoologische Notizen. L. Friedrichsen & Co., Hamburg. xxxvi + ii + 215pp.
- 1877 Museum Godeffroy. Catalog VI. Nachträge zu Catalog. V.. L. Friedrichsen & Co., Hamburg v + 108 pp.
- 1879 Museum Godeffroy. Catalog VII. Wirbeltheire(Animalia vertebrata) und Nachträge zu Catalog V & VI aus den übrigen Thierklassen. L. Friedrichsen and Co., Hamburg. viii + 99 pp.
- 1881 Museum Godeffroy, Hamburg. Catalog VIII. Zoologischer Anzeiger 4 (91) (Beilage)

Other (partial list)

- 1881 with R. Krause Die ethographisch-anthropologische Abtheilung des Museums Godeffroy. 1881 687 pages, 46 tables, 1 map., Hamburg (L. Friedrichsen & Co)
- 1888 with R. Krause. Die ethnographisch anthropologische Abtheilung des Museum Godeffroy. Archiv f. Ethnographie, Bd. I, 60-7.
- 1897 with Johann Stanislaus Kubary, der Erforscher der Südsee-Inseln, gest. im Oktober 1896 auf der Insel Ponape'. [Johann Stanislaus Kubary, the researcher of the South Sea Islands, who died in October 1896 on the island of Pohnpei]. Internationales Archiv für Ethnographie 10, pp. 132–136. Long obituary of Kubary.
