= Tetens =

Tetens may refer to:

== People ==
- Alfred Tetens (1835–1903), German explorer
- Axel Tetens (1892–1961), Danish Olympic wrestler
- Johannes Nikolaus Tetens (1736–1807), German-Danish philosopher and scientist
- Otto Tetens (1865–1945), German scientist
- T.H. Tetens (1899–1976), Jewish German journalist

== Other uses ==
- Tetens equation, calculates the saturation vapor pressure of water over liquid and ice

== See also ==
- Teten
