= List of shipwrecks in December 1878 =

The list of shipwrecks in December 1878 includes ships sunk, foundered, grounded, or otherwise lost during December 1878.

== 1 December ==
List of shipwrecks: 1 December 1878
Ship	State	Description
Peerless	United States	The schooner ran aground at Cape Charles, Virginia in calm seas. Around noon a gale came up and she rolled over and she went to pieces. Eight crewmen were rescued by the United States Life Saving Service before she broke up. She was on a voyage from San Blas to Baltimore, Maryland.
Rosamond	United Kingdom	The ship was driven ashore at Cherbourg, Manche, France. She was on a voyage from Saint-Malo, Ille-et-Vilaine, France to Newcastle upon Tyne, Northumberland.
Royal Diadem	United Kingdom	The barque was severely damaged by fire at Charleston, South Carolina, United States. She was consequently condemned.
Scotland	United Kingdom	The steamship was severely damaged by fire at London.
Unnamed	United States	A steamboat collided with another and sank in the Mississippi River with the loss of twenty lives.

== 2 December ==
List of shipwrecks: 2 December 1878
Ship	State	Description
Arabella	United Kingdom	The brigantine ran aground on the Dutchman Bank, in Liverpool Bay and was abandoned. She was on a voyage from Garston, Lancashire to Dublin. She subsequently floated off and was taken in to Beaumaris, Anglesey in a leaky condition.
Gypsy Queen	United Kingdom	The brigantine stranded on the Kimmeridge Ledges, off St Alban's Head Dorset while en route from Navassa, West Indies to Newcastle upon Tyne, Northumberland.

== 3 December ==
List of shipwrecks: 3 December 1878
Ship	State	Description
Eskbank	United Kingdom	The ship was driven ashore at Diamond Head, Kingdom of Hawaii. She was on a voyage from Glasgow, Renfrewshire to Honolulu, Kingdom of Hawaii.
Pallas	United Kingdom	The ship ran aground at "Bland". She was on a voyage from Härnösand, Sweden to London. She was refloated and put in to Copenhagen, Denmark.
Vice-Admiral May	Netherlands	The ship ran aground in Netherlands East Indies waters.

== 4 December ==
List of shipwrecks: 4 December 1878
Ship	State	Description
Bretagne	France	The ship departed from Pensacola, Florida, United States for Greenock, Renfrewshire, United Kingdom. No further trace,. presumed foundered with the loss of all hands.
Harry	United States	The ship was wrecked in the Corn Islands, Venezuela. She was on a voyage from Baltimore, Maryland to "St. Andreas".
Oswego	United States	The ship was wrecked at West Quoddy, Nova Scotia, Canada. Seven crewmen made it to Campobello Island in the ship's boat, and eight crewmen were rescued by the United States Life Saving Service. She was on a voyage from "Point Wolfe" to Liverpool, Lancashire, United Kingdom.
Smerce	Netherlands	The ship capsized at Amsterdam, North Holland.
Wihelmina	United States	The barque ran aground 1 nautical mile (1.9 km) offshore on the bar at Egg Harbor, New Jersey, United States, and broke up. Six crewmen made it to shore in the ship's boat, and the rest of the crew was rescued by the United States Life Saving Service. She was on a voyage from Antwerp, Belgium to Philadelphia, Pennsylvania.

== 5 December ==
List of shipwrecks: 5 December 1878
Ship	State	Description
Bel Stewart	United Kingdom	The ship was driven ashore in the Norwalk Islands, Connecticut, United States. She was on a voyage from Larne, County Antrim, Ireland, to Norwalk, Connecticut.
Connaught Ranger	United Kingdom	The ship was driven ashore at "Yambing", China. She was on a voyage from London, England, to Shanghai, China. She was refloated and taken in to Hong Kong in a leaky condition.
Juan	United Kingdom	The brigantine was driven ashore at Brook, Isle of Wight. She was on a voyage from Sunderland, County Durham to Exeter, Devon, England.
Lena	Germany	The steamship was driven ashore near Bremen, Germany. She was on a voyage from Savannah, Georgia, United States to Bremen. She was refloated on the next day.
Renown	United Kingdom	The schooner was driven ashore at Amble, Northumberland, England. She was refloated and taken in to Amble in a waterlogged condition.
Unique	United Kingdom	The schooner was driven ashore and wrecked in the Bay of Angra, Azores.

== 6 December ==
List of shipwrecks: 6 December 1878
Ship	State	Description
Acacia	United Kingdom	The ship ran aground at Berwick upon Tweed, Northumberland, England. She was on a voyage from Oran, Algeria to Berwick upon Tweed. She was refloated and found to be leaky.
Conflict	United Kingdom	The barque was sighted in the Indian Ocean whilst on a voyage from Calcutta, India to Hull, Yorkshire, England. She exhibited signs of collision damage. No further trace, presumed foundered with the loss of all hands.
Lyger Sagen	Norway	The brigantine collided with the steamship United Service (United Kingdom) and sank in the English Channel (4 nautical miles (7.4 km) off Dover, Kent, United Kingdom. Her eight crew were rescued. Lyuger Sagen was on a voyage from Sicily, Italy to Bergen, Norway.
Lyman Cann	Canada	The barque was driven ashore at Dunkirk, Nord, France. She was on a voyage from Philadelphia, Pennsylvania, United States, to Dunkirk.
Marie	Norway	The brig was wrecked at Thisted, Denmark, with the loss of nine of her crew. She was on a voyage from South Shields, County Durham, England, to Christiania, Norway.
Marigo	Greece	The barque was driven ashore and wrecked at Sulina, United Principalities. She was on a voyage from Samsun, Ottoman Empire to a Mediterranean port.
Olivier	France	The full-rigged ship was wrecked at Portoferro, Sardinia, Italy. She was on a voyage from La Calle, Algeria to Marseille, Bouches-du-Rhône, France.

== 7 December ==
List of shipwrecks: 7 December 1878
Ship	State	Description
Albert	Germany	The brigantine was driven ashore at Dungeness, Kent, United Kingdom. She was on a voyage from Fowey, Cornwall, United Kingdom, to Stettin, Germany. She was refloated with assistance from the Coastguard and resumed her voyage.
Angelica	United Kingdom	The ship was driven ashore at West Souter Head, Cromartyshire. She was on a voyage from Lossiemouth, Moray, Scotland, to Sunderland, County Durham, England.
Bessie Rowe	United Kingdom	The ship collided with the steamship Montana (United Kingdom) in the River Mersey and was severely damaged. Bessie Rowe was on a voyage from Huelva, Spain, to Liverpool, Lancashire, England.
Bomarsund	United Kingdom	The transport ship was severely damaged at Sheerness, Kent, England, whilst being laden with guns from HMS Undaunted (Royal Navy). A 6-ton gun was dropped into her hold. She was beached and sank. She was refloated and towed to Chatham, Kent, for repairs.
Caroline Goodyear	United Kingdom	The ship ran aground at Teignmouth, Devon, England. She was on a voyage from Newcastle upon Tyne, Northumberland, England, to Teignmouth. She was refloated the next day.
Commissariat	United Kingdom	The steamship was driven ashore on Skagen, Denmark. Her crew were rescued. She was on a voyage from Newcastle upon Tyne, England, to Swinemünde, Germany.
France	France	The steamship ran aground at Cape Pinene, Bouches-du-Rhône, France. She was on a voyage from Marseille, Bouches-du-Rhône to Genoa, Italy. She was refloated and put back to Marseille.
General Scott	United States	The schooner sprung a leak off Sandy Hook, New Jersey, United States, and was beached on the west beach to prevent sinking. Attempts were made over the next six days to refloat her, but she ended up a total loss. Her cargo and some equipment was salvaged. Her four crewmen made it to shore in the ship's boat.
Longhirst	United Kingdom	The steamship struck rocks at Hartley, Northumberland, England, and sank. Her seventeen crew were rescued by a tug. She was on a voyage from London to the River Tyne.
Lyman Cann	United Kingdom	The barque was driven ashore at Dunkirk, Nord, France. She was on a voyage from Philadelphia, Pennsylvania, United States to Dunkirk. She was refloated and taken in to Dunkirk.
Nelson	United Kingdom	The ship ran aground on the Pluckington Bank, in Liverpool Bay, England. She was on a voyage from Dunkirk, France, to Liverpool. She was refloated and taken in to Liverpool.

== 8 December ==
List of shipwrecks: 8 December 1878
Ship	State	Description
Andreas Rickmers	Germany	The ship foundered in the Atlantic Ocean 150 nautical miles (280 km) off Madeira. Her crew were rescued by the barque Ville de Tenfeau (France). Andreas Rickmers was on a voyage from Bremen to Rangoon, Burma.
Charles	United Kingdom	The barque was driven ashore at Eastbourne, Sussex. She was refloated and towed in to Dover, Kent.
Courier	Germany	The schooner was driven ashore on Skagen, Denmark. Her crew were rescued. She was on a voyage from Schiedam, South Holland, Netherland to Stettin.
Geyser	Russia	The brig was driven ashore on Skagen. Her crew were rescued. She was on a voyage from Plymouth, Devon, United Kingdom to Riga.
Livadia	Imperial Russian Navy	The Imperial yacht, aground on rocks on the coast of Crimea in the Black Sea since the night of 21–22 October, was destroyed by a violent storm.
Teresa	United Kingdom	The schooner was run into by the steamship Vindolana (United Kingdom) and was beached at Tilbury, Essex.

== 9 December ==
List of shipwrecks: 9 December 1878
Ship	State	Description
Amethyst	United Kingdom	The ship was run into by the steamship Camilla (United Kingdom) at Üsküdar, Ottoman Empire and was severely damaged.
Celeste Henri	France	The ship was driven ashore at Courseulles-sur-Mer, Calvados. She was on a voyage from Blyth, Northumberland, United Kingdom to Courseulles-sur-Mer. She was refloated and taken in to Courseulles-sur-Mer.
Chester	United Kingdom	The brig was driven ashore at Trouville-sur-Mer, Calvados. Her crew were rescued. She was on a voyage from Swansea, Glamorgan to Trouville-sur-Mer. She was refloated on 16 December.
Europa	United Kingdom	The ship ran into the schooner Pride of the Isles (United Kingdom) in the North Sea and was severely damaged.
Glide	Sweden	The ship was driven ashore on Öland, . She was on a voyage from Sundsvall to Gloucester, United Kingdom. She was refloated and abandoned by her crew with some loss of life. Glide was taken in to Stockholm in a waterlogged condition.
Ingeborg	Netherlands	The brig foundered in the Dogger Bank with the loss of one of her seven crew. Survivors were rescued by the smack Grimsby (United Kingdom). Ingeborg was on a voyage from Newcastle upon Tyne, Northumberland to Copenhagen, Denmark.
James Aiken	United Kingdom	The ship grounded on a sandbank off the coast of India approximately 50 nautical miles (93 km) from Madras. She was refloated and reached Madras a few days later.
Jessie	United Kingdom	The schooner was wrecked on the Haisborough Sands, in the North Sea off the coast of Norfolk. Her crew were rescued. She was on a voyage from South Shields, County Durham to Teignmouth, Devon.

== 10 December ==
List of shipwrecks: 10 December 1878
Ship	State	Description
Bayard	United Kingdom	The steamship foundered with the loss of 22 of her 24 crew. Survivors were rescued from a boat on 17 December by the brigantine Encarnacion (Spain). Bayard was on a voyage from New Orleans, Louisiana, United States to Rouen, Seine-Inférieure, France.
Davaar	United Kingdom	The steamship struck Patterson's Rock, off the Isle of Mull. She was refloated and consequently sank. Her twelve crew survived. She was on her maiden voyage, from Glasgow, Renfrewshire to Limerick.
Emily B Souder	United States	The steamship foundered in the Atlantic Ocean with the loss of all but two of the 38 people on board. She was on a voyage from New York to Samaná, Dominican Republic.
Empress	United Kingdom	The brigantine ran aground at Montego Bay, Jamaica. She was on a voyage from New York to Montego Bay.
Graville	France	The barque ran aground on the Greas Nogel Sand, in the North Sea. She was on a voyage from Iquique, Chile to Hamburg, Germany.
Kung Ring	Sweden	The steamship collided with the steamship Baltzar (Sweden) and sank off Skagen, Denmark. All on board were rescued. Kung Ring was on a voyage from London, United Kingdom to Gothenburg.
Lady Hulse	United Kingdom	The barque ran aground at Lima, Peru. She was on a voyage from Cardiff, Glamorgan to Callao, Peru.
Mystère	France	The ship ran aground on the Basse Jaune, off the Îles de Glénan, Finistère and sank.

== 11 December ==
List of shipwrecks: 11 December 1878
Ship	State	Description
Arthur	United Kingdom	The steamship ran aground between Brouwershaven and Hellevoetsluis, Zeeland, Netherlands. She was refloated on 16 December.
Breeze	United Kingdom	The steamship was driven ashore at Calais, France. All on board were rescued. She was on a voyage from Dover, Kent to Calais.
Coromandel	France	The steamship was wrecked at "Wattara". Her crew were rescued.
Edward Albro	Canada	The ship departed from Nassau, Bahamas for New York, United States. No further trace, reported missing.
E. M. Buehler	United States	The schooner was driven ashore at Aspinwall, United States of Colombia.
Express Tilton	United States	The schooner was driven ashore and sank at Aspinwall.
J. P. Robinson	United Kingdom	The schooner was driven ashore at Aspinwall.
Lavernock	United Kingdom	The steamship collided with Juan Cunningham (United Kingdom and other steamship and sank in the Nervión at Portugalete, Spain. Her crew survived. She was on a voyage from Bilbao, Spain to Cardiff, Glamorgan.
Lorine	United States	The schooner was driven ashore and sank at Aspinwall with the loss of a crew member.

== 12 December ==
List of shipwrecks: 12 December 1878
Ship	State	Description
Alma	United Kingdom	The schooner collided with the steamship Henry Morton (United Kingdom) and sank in the North Sea off Aldeburgh, Suffolk. Her crew were rescued.
Eros	United Kingdom	The brigantine was driven ashore at Hawthorn Hythe, 3 nautical miles (5.6 km) south of Seaham, County Durham. She was on a voyage from Lowestoft, Suffolk to the River Tyne. She was refloated with the assistance of two tugs.
Gurtubay	Spain	The steamship was driven ashore at Maasdrooge, South Holland, Netherlands. She was on a voyage from Maryport, Cumberland, United Kingdom to Rotterdam, South Holland. She was refloated with the assistance of tugs.
Loch Long	United Kingdom	The ship capsized at London. She was righted.
Nuphar	United Kingdom	The steamship was driven ashore and wrecked 2 nautical miles (3.7 km) from Honfleur, Manche, France. She was on a voyage from Königsberg, Germany to Rouen, Seine-Inférieure, France.

== 13 December ==
List of shipwrecks: 13 December 1878
Ship	State	Description
Amelie	France	The ship sprang a leak and sank in the North Sea 4 nautical miles (7.4 km) off Johnshaven, Aberdeenshire, United Kingdom. Her crew survived. She was on a voyage from Wick, Caithness, United Kingdom to Gravelines, Nord.
City of Montreal	United Kingdom	The steamship caught fire at New York, United States and was scuttled. She was on a voyage from Savannah, Georgia, United States to Havre de Grâce, Seine-Inférieure.
Compton	United Kingdom	The steamship struck rocks at Malta and was damaged. She was on a voyage from Malta to Antwerp, Belgium. She was refloated with assistance from HMS Antelope (Royal Navy) and taken in to Valetta.
Globe	United Kingdom	The barque was driven ashore and wrecked on the coast of Haiti.
Inverary	United Kingdom	The barque ran aground at Port Natal, Natal Colony. She was on a voyage from Adelaide, South Australia to Port Natal. She was refloated on 15 December.
Quatre Sœurs	France	The barque was wrecked at "Pentacottah", India with the loss of two of her nine crew.
Rival	United Kingdom	The ship was driven ashore near Portaferry, County Down.

== 14 December ==
List of shipwrecks: 14 December 1878
Ship	State	Description
Boatswain	(United Kingdom of Great Britain and Ireland) Guernsey	The brig was driven ashore in Colwell Bay. She was on a voyage from Guernsey to London. She was refloated the next day and resumed her voyage.
Cambrian	United Kingdom	The steamship ran aground in the Scheldt and broke her back. She was on a voyage from Odesa, Russia to Antwerp, Belgium. She was declared a total loss.
Charles Emilie	France	The lugger was driven ashore and wrecked at Brook, Isle of Wight, United Kingdom. She was on a voyage from Bilbao, Spain to Dunkirk, Nord.
Emana	(Russian Empire) Grand Duchy of Finland	The barque ran aground on Saltholm, Denmark. She was on a voyage from an English port to Stockholm, Sweden. She was refloated on 16 December and taken in to Kastrup, Denmark.
Ferdinande	United Kingdom	The schooner collided with the steamship Mississippi (United Kingdom) and sank in the Crosby Channel. Her crew were rescued.
Firth of Clyde	United Kingdom	The ship was sighted off Anjer, Netherlands East Indies whilst on a voyage from Samarang, Netherlands East Indies to a British port. No further trace, reported missing.
Goolwa	United Kingdom	The steam hopper ran aground in Champion Bay. She was on a voyage from the Clyde to Adelaide, South Australia. She was refloated on 16 December.
Ithiel	United Kingdom	The brig was driven ashore at Brook. She was on a voyage from Guernsey, Channel Islands to Whitstable, Kent.
Le Creusot	United Kingdom	The steamship ran into the quayside at Sunderland, County Durham on being launched and was damaged.
Mona's Isle	(United Kingdom of Great Britain and Ireland) Isle of Man	The paddle steamer grounded on Burbo Bank off New Brighton, Cheshire, inward to Liverpool from Ramsey. She was refloated on 15 December and taken into Liverpool.
Spey	United Kingdom	The steamship collided with the steamship Redewater (United Kingdom) and sank in the North Sea off Flamborough Head, Yorkshire. Her crew were rescued by Redewater. Spey was on a voyage from London to Sunderland, County Durham.
Unnamed	United Kingdom	The brig was driven ashore at the Cliff End Fort, Isle of Wight.

== 15 December ==
List of shipwrecks: 15 December 1878
Ship	State	Description
Bwllfa	United Kingdom	The steamship ran aground on the Shipwash Sand, in the North Sea off the coast of Suffolk. She was on a voyage from Granton, Lothian to London. She was refloated on 18 December and resumed her voyage.
Evangelistra	Greece	The brig was driven ashore and wrecked at Civitavecchia, Italy. She was on a voyage from Marseille, Bouches-du-Rhône, France to Civitavecchia.
Ibis	United Kingdom	The brigantine was abandoned in the Atlantic Ocean north of the Azores (46°38′N 14°21′W). She was on a voyage from Dahomey to Falmouth, Cornwall. She was discovered on 17 December by Mary Cook (United Kingdom), which put four crew aboard with the intention of taking her in to Falmouth. She arrived at Queenstown, County Cork on 28 December.
Jean Agathe	France	The barque was driven ashore at Selsey, Sussex, United Kingdom. She was refloated and resumed her voyage.
Lartington	United Kingdom	The freighter suffered a cracked hull and massive leakage in a storm and headed for Bermuda, but struck a reef and sank 5 miles north west from the Royal Naval Dockyard.
Leader	United Kingdom	The schooner collided with the steamship Ben Ledi (United Kingdom about 20 nautical miles (37 km) north of St Ives, Cornwall with the loss of one of her five crew. Survivors were rescued by Ben Ledi.
Unnamed	Greece	The barque ran aground at Sulina, United Principalities with the loss of seven of her crew.

== 16 December ==
List of shipwrecks: 16 December 1878
Ship	State	Description
Avalon	United Kingdom	The steamship ran aground at Maassluis, South Holland, Netherlands. She was refloated.
Concha	Spain	The steamship ran agroujnd in the Scheldt. She was on a voyage from Antwerp, Belgium to Pasajes. She was refloated and put back to Pasajes.
Genitore	Italy	The brig foundered in the Mediterranean Sea off "Jaleppia". She was on a voyage from Gaza, Egypt to Philippeville, Algeria.
Livingstone	United Kingdom	The tug collided with a schooner at Leith, Lothian and was severely damaged.
Margaret	United Kingdom	The brigantine was driven ashore and wrecked at Blakeney, Norfolk. Her crew were rescued. She was on a voyage from Sunderland, County Durham to Rye Sussex.
Seine	France	The steamship was damaged by fire at Liverpool, Lancashire, United Kingdom.

== 17 December ==
List of shipwrecks: 17 December 1878
Ship	State	Description
Dalton	United Kingdom	The steamship was driven ashore at Brook, Isle of Wight. She was on a voyage from Brăila, United Principalities to King's Lynn, Norfolk. She was refloated with assistance from the tug Lightning (United Kingdom) and resumed her voyage.
Euphrosyne	United Kingdom	The barque was driven ashore and wrecked at Adra, Spain. Her crew were rescued.
Henrietta Adriana	Netherlands	The full-rigged ship ran aground at Oude-Tonge, South Holland. She was on a voyage from Hellevoetsluis, Zeeland to Java, Netherlands East Indies.
Homer	United Kingdom	The steamship departed from Boston, Massachusetts for Liverpool, Lancashire. No further trace, presumed foundered with the loss of all 27 crew.
Mary Slussmann	United States	The schooner was destroyed by fire at Aspinwall, United States of Colombia.

== 18 December ==
List of shipwrecks: 18 December 1878
Ship	State	Description
Adrianople	Greece	The ship was driven ashore and wrecked at Enos, Ottoman Empire.
Aghios Nicolaos	Greece	The ship was wrecked at Enos.
Aios Nicolaios	Greece	The ship was wrecked at Dedeağaç, Ottoman Empire.
Byzantin	France	The steamship collided with the steamship Rinaldo (United Kingdom) and sank in the Dardanelles off Gallipoli, Ottoman Empire with some loss of life. Of the 164 people on board, more than 100 were rescued. Rinaldo rescued 90 and the steamship Viadomora (Greece) rescued five. HMS Flamingo (Royal Navy) was dispatched to search for survivors. Byzantin was on a voyage from Marseille, Bouches-du-Rhône to Constantinople, Ottoman Empire.
Ida	United Kingdom	The barque was driven ashore and wrecked at Yantai (Chefoo), China.
John A. Briggs	United Kingdom	The full-rigged ship ran aground near Petten, North Holland, Netherlands. She was on a voyage from Philadelphia, Pennsylvania to Bremen, Germany. She was refloated with assistance and resumed her voyage.
John Beaumont	United Kingdom	The steamship collided with the quayside and sank at North Queensferry, Fife. All on board survived. She was on a voyage from South Queensferry, Lothian to North Queensferry.
Lord Gough	United Kingdom	The steamship was run into by HMS Cleopatra (Royal Navy) in the Clyde and was severely damaged.
Maria Vagliano	Italy	The brig was wrecked at Dedeagac, Ottoman Empire. She was on a voyage from Dedeagac to a British port.
Memphis	United Kingdom	The ship was wrecked at "Nicore".
Mesopotamia	United Kingdom	The steamship was wrecked in the Berlengas, off Peniche, Portugal with the loss of eight of the 38 people on board. She was on a voyage from London to Bussorah, Persia.
Ocean	United Kingdom	The schooner was driven ashore and wrecked at Lindisfarne, Northumberland.
Rookwood	Canada	The brig departed from New York for London. No further trace, reported missing.
Star of the Sea	United Kingdom	The schooner ran aground on the West Rocks, in the North Sea off the coast of Essex. She was on a voyage from Sunderland, County Durham to Harwich, Essex. She was refloated with assistance from the smack Albatross (United Kingdom).
Thalia	United Kingdom	The barque foundered in the Pacific Ocean south of Cape Horn, Chile. Some of her crew were rescued by Nushka (United Kingdom); a boat with eight crew aboard was reported missing. Thalia was on a voyage from Sunderland, County Durham to Honolulu, Kingdom of Hawaii.
Thessalia	Greece	The ship was wrecked at Enos.
Tre Fratelli	Italy	The ship was driven ashore at Roses, Spain.
Unity	United Kingdom	The steamship ran aground in the River Mersey at New Brighton, Cheshire. She was on a voyage from Liverpool, Lancashire to Cardiff, Glamorgan. She was refloated and put back to Liverpool.
Two unnamed vessels	Greece	Two lighters were wrecked at Enos.

== 19 December ==
List of shipwrecks: 19 December 1878
Ship	State	Description
Aurora	Germany	The barque was driven ashore and wrecked at Thisted, Denmark. Her crew were rescued. She was on a voyage from Memel to London, United Kingdom.
Bride	United Kingdom	The steamship ran aground at Breaksea Point, Glamorgan. She was on a voyage from Hayle, Cornwall to Cardiff, Glamorgan. She was refloated the next day.
Charles Mitchell	United Kingdom	The steamship was driven ashore at Blakeney, Norfolk. She was refloated the next day with assistance from the tug Patriot (United Kingdom).
Constantin	Russia	The ship was wrecked off Tenedos, Ottoman Empire. She was on a voyage from Taganrog to an English port.
Coruripe	Brazil	The steamship was wrecked at Barra Grande. Her crew were rescued. She was on a voyage from Aracaju to Pernambuco.
Doriga	United Kingdom	The barque was abandoned in the Bay of Biscay. Her eighteen crew were rescued hy the steamship Zena (United Kingdom).
Fairy	United Kingdom	The dandy-rigged sloop was wrecked on the Tuskary Rock. Her six crew were rescued by the Carnsore lifeboat.
Macgregor	United Kingdom	The ship ran aground in the Narrows. She was on a voyage from Boston, Massachusetts, United States to London. She was refloated and resumed her voyage.
Melita	United Kingdom	The brig ran aground on Scroby Sands, Norfolk. She was refloated but was beached at Winterton-on-Sea, Norfolk. All sixteen people on board were rescued by the Caister Lifeboat Godsend ( Royal National Lifeboat Institution). Melita was refloated on 28 December and taken in to Great Yarmouth, Norfolk.
Northumbria	United Kingdom	The brig was driven ashore in the Dardanelles. She was on a voyage from Taganrog, Russia to Malta. She was refloated on 20 December with the assistance of a tug and resumed her voyage.
Notre Dame de la Grâce	France	The steamship collided with the steamship Benwell (United Kingdom) and sank at Havre de Grâce, Seine-Inférieure. Her crew survived. Notre Dame de la Grâce was on a voyage from Havre de Grâce to Honfleur, Manche. She was refloated on 24 December.
Philena Winslow	United States	The ship was wrecked on Gough Island, Tristan da Cunha. Ten crew reached Tristan da Cunha, from where they were rescued by the steamship Iris (United Kingdom). Philena Winslow was on a voyage from Cardiff to Singapore, Straits Settlements.
Universe, and Valkyrien	United Kingdom	The barques collided in The Downs and were both severely damaged. Universe was on a voyage from Christiania, Norway to Southampton, Hampshire. Valkyrien was on a voyage from Sunderland, County Durham to Singapore, Straits Settlements.

== 20 December ==
List of shipwrecks: 20 December 1878
Ship	State	Description
Apenrade	Denmark	The derelict ship was driven ashore at Rivadeo, Spain in a capsized condition.
C. S. Butler	United Kingdom	The steamship ran aground on the Haisborough Sands, in the North Sea off the coast of Norfolk and was wrecked. Her seventeen crew abandoned ship the next day. They were rescued by the schooner Trio (United Kingdom). C. S. Butler was on a voyage from the River Tyne to London.
Economy	United Kingdom	The derelict schooner was assisted in to Great Yarmouth, Norfolk by a tug. She was on a voyage from Poole, Dorset to Middlesbrough, Yorkshire.
Fanny	United Kingdom	The sloop was driven ashore at Gurnard, Isle of Wight. She was refloated with assistance from the tug Lightning (United Kingdom).
Nancy Lee	United Kingdom	The steamship ran aground in the Forth and Clyde Canal and was holed by ice. She was on a voyage from Aberdeen to Campbeltown, Argyllshire.
Recompense	United Kingdom	The schooner was abandoned in the North Sea. Her crew were rescued. She was subsequently driven ashore and wrecked at Runton, Norfolk. She was on a voyage from Seaham, County Durham to Whitstable, Kent.
Samuel Wonson	United States	The schooner was wrecked at Liscomb, Nova Scotia, Canada. Her crew were rescued.
Surrey	United Kingdom	The ship departed from the River Tyne for Madras, India. No further trace, reported missing.
Unnamed	United Kingdom	The barge was run down by the steamship Lumley (United Kingdom) and sank in the River Thames at Deptford, Kent.

== 21 December ==
List of shipwrecks: 21 December 1878
Ship	State	Description
Broomhill	United Kingdom	The steamship struck the Clough Rocks, in the Farne Islands, Northumberland and was damaged. She was on a voyage from Amble, Northumberland to Dundee, Forfarshire. She completed her voyage in a leaky condition.
Conflict	United Kingdom	The ship was sighted in the Indian Ocean whilst on a voyage from Calcutta, India to London. No further trace, reported missing.
Elizabeth Alice	United Kingdom	The ship was driven ashore at Eyemouth, Berwickshire. She was on a voyage from an Italian port to Eyemouth.
Freya	Germany	The sloop was driven ashore and wrecked at Ny-Hellesund, Denmark.
Iserbrook	United Kingdom	The brig caught fire at her berth in Darling Harbour, Sydney, New South Wales when members of her crew accidentally dropped a lit match into rum spilling from a cask the ship′s captain mistakenly had unplugged in the ship′s store room. The fire went out of control almost immediately and she was scuttled to prevent it from spreading. Her captain died in the fire.
Mersey, and Mona	United Kingdom (United Kingdom of Great Britain and Ireland) Isle of Man	The steam barge Mersey collided with Mona at Liverpool, Lancashire. Both vessels were severely damaged.
Moses Adams	United States	The schooner was abandoned at sea. Her crew were rescued.
Northam	United Kingdom	The ship sank after catching fire off the coast of Brazil. All the crew and twenty passengers were picked up by Albion (United Kingdom) and an Italian barque.
Parnaes	Germany	The barque was driven ashore at Lydd, Kent, United Kingdom. She was on a voyage from Hamburg to Valparaíso, Chile.
Risør	Norway	The barque ran aground at Lyngør. She was on a voyage from Baltimore, Maryland, United States to Copenhagen, Denmark. She was refloated.
S. H. Pool	United States	The schooner went ashore in a snowstorm on Stage Island, Maine near the mouth of the Saco River, she broke in two, a total loss. Her crew of four were rescued by the United States Life Saving Service.
South Western	United Kingdom	The steamship ran into the steamship Bavarian in the River Mersey and was severely damaged. South Western was on a voyage from Liverpool, Lancashire to Whitehaven, Cumberland.
Surprise	United Kingdom	The tug was run into by the steamship Countess of Galloway (United Kingdom) off the Crosby Lightship ( Trinity House) and was severely damaged. Some of her crew were taken off by Countess of Galloway.
Zia Catterina	Italy	The ship collided with the steamship Clytie (United Kingdom) and sank off the Northsand Lightship ( Trinity House). Her crew were rescued by Clytie'. Zia Catterina was on a voyage from Newcastle upon Tyne, Northumberland to Venice.

== 22 December ==
List of shipwrecks: 22 December 1878
Ship	State	Description
Carl	Germany	The brig was run down and sunk in the North Sea off South Shields, County Durham, United Kingdom by the steamship Black Swan (United Kingdom). Her crew were rescued by Black Swan. Carl was on a voyage from London to South Shields.
Diana	Germany	The steamship ran aground at Maassluis, South Holland, Netherlands. She was on a voyage from Riga, Russia to Schiedam, South Holland. She was refloated with the assistance of a tug.
James A. Potter	United States	The schooner ran aground off Long Island, New York in a gale and heavy seas and was wrecked. She grounded 125 yards (114 m) offshore. One crewman washed overboard and drowned immediately after grounding, seven were rescued by the United States Life Saving Service.
Ranger	United Kingdom	The steamship was wrecked 15 nautical miles (28 km) north of Cape St. Vincent, Portugal with the loss of all but four of her crew. She was on a voyage from Swansea, Glamorgan to Barcelona, Spain.

== 23 December ==
List of shipwrecks: 23 December 1878
Ship	State	Description
Ann Taylor	United Kingdom	The brig was driven ashore at Hornsea, Yorkshire. Her crew were rescued. She was on a voyage from London to Hartlepool, County Durham.
Francesco Garquilo	Spain	The ship was driven ashore and wrecked at "Boca del Sagua", Cuba. She was on a voyage from Marseille, Bouches-du-Rhône, France to Havana, Cuba.
Kate	United Kingdom	The schooner was driven ashore at Breaksea Point, Glamorgan. She was refloated.
Mary Campbell	United Kingdom	The smack sprang a leak and foundered 4 nautical miles (7.4 km) off the Isle of Arran. Her crew survived. She was on a voyage from Glasgow, Renfrewshire to Newry, County Antrim.
Meggie	United Kingdom	The ship caught fire at Cagliari, Sardinia, Italy. She was scuttled off Cape Spartivento.
Merino	(United Kingdom of Great Britain and Ireland) Victoria	The ship was wrecked on "Jarman Island" in a cyclone. She was on a voyage from the Laccadive Islands, Western Australia to Melbourne.
Vesta	Flag unknown	The schooner was driven ashore on the west coast of Jutland, Denmark. She was on a voyage from Honfleur, Manche, France to Gothenburg, Sweden.

== 24 December ==
List of shipwrecks: 24 December 1878
Ship	State	Description
Alabama	United States	Alabama The paddle steamer caught fire and sank.
C. & C. Brooks	United States	The schooner went ashore 3/4 nautical mile (1.4 km) from Life Saving Station No. 25, 4th District on the New Jersey coast in heavy seas and sank, a total loss. Her crew of five were rescued by the United States Life Saving Service.
Devon	United Kingdom	The smack collided with another vessel. She was taken in to Great Yarmouth, Norfolk in a derelict condition.
Fred	United Kingdom	The ship ran aground on the Drum Shoals. She was on a voyage from Wilmington, Delaware to Liverpool, Lancashire.
Gjerson	Denmark	The barque was driven ashore at Dungeness, Kent, United Kingdom. She was on a voyage from Copenhagen to Saint Thomas, Virgin Islands. She was refloated with the assistance of a tug and taken in to Dover, Kent.
Ida	United Kingdom	The ship ran aground on the Clough Rock, in the Belfast Lough. She was on a voyage from Drogheda, County Louth to Glasgow, Renfrewshire. She was refloated and resumed her voyage.
Marie Elizabeth	Germany	The schooner foundered in the North Sea. Her crew were rescued by Victoria (United Kingdom). Marie Elizabeth was on a voyage from Newcastle upon Tyne, Northumberland, United Kingdom to Fehmarn.
Penair	United Kingdom	The brigantine, broke her tow, and was driven onto the east bank of the River Hayle during a gale. She was towed off on 30 December and it was found there was little damage to her hull.
Princess Royal	United Kingdom	The brigantine was driven ashore at the Camden Fort, County Cork with some loss of life.
Shamrock	United Kingdom	The ship was driven ashore at Wexford. She was on a voyage from Glasgow, Renfrewshire to New Ross, County Wexford.
State of Louisiana	United Kingdom	The steamship ran aground on the Hunter Rock, in the Larne Lough. All on board were rescued. She was on a voyage from the Clyde to New York, United States. She was run into by the steamship Norseman on 28 December. State of Louisiana broke up on 4 January 1879.
Teal	United Kingdom	The steamship ran aground in the River Thames at Northfleet, Kent whilst avoiding a collision. She was on a voyage from Hamburg, Germany to London. She was refloated with the assistance of a tug.

== 25 December ==
List of shipwrecks: 25 December 1878
Ship	State	Description
Amazonia	United Kingdom	The steamship ran ashore in the River Tyne.
Amelia	France	The brigantine was run into by a British steamship and sank in the North Sea 15 leagues (45 nautical miles (83 km) off Dunkirk, Nord with the loss of six of her nine crew. She was on a voyage from Newcastle upon Tyne, Northumberland, United Kingdom to Brest, Finistère.
County de Pictou	Canada	The ship foundered in the Atlantic Ocean. Her fourteen crew were rescued by the steamship City of London (United Kingdom). County de Pictou was on a voyage from Barrow-in-Furness, Lancashire, United Kingdom to Sandy Hook, New Jersey, United States.
Emily B. Souder	United States	The steamship sprang a leak in a severe storm in the Atlantic Ocean and was abandoned. The 38 people on board left but the boats capsized, only two surviving. She was on a voyage from New York to Puerto Plata, Dominican Republic.
Guiseppina Accame	Italy	The brigantine foundered in the Atlantic Ocean. Her eleven crew were rescued by the schooner Albatross ( (United Kingdom of Great Britain and Ireland) Jersey). Guiseppina Accame was on a voyage from Baltimore, Maryland, United States to Falmouth, Cornwall, United Kingdom.
Heather Bell	United Kingdom	The tug ran ashore in the River Tyne.
Louisa	United Kingdom	The ship foundered at sea. Her crew were rescued by Campero (United Kingdom). Louisa was on a voyage from Callao, Peru to Greenock, Renfrewshire.
Unnamed	United Kingdom	The barque ran ashore in the River Tyne. She was on a voyage from the Bull River to the River Tyne. She was then run into by the steamship Vauxhall (United Kingdom) and damaged.

== 26 December ==
List of shipwrecks: 26 December 1878
Ship	State	Description
Banshee	United Kingdom	The ship ran aground at Sunderland, County Durham.
Confidence	United Kingdom	The brigantine was driven ashore at Youghal, County Cork. Her five crew were rescued by rocket apparatus.
Delphin	Norway	The schooner was driven ashore at Filey, Yorkshire, United Kingdom. Five crew were rescued by rocket apparatus; her captain remained on board. She was on a voyage from Norway to Yorkshire.
Impetuous	(United Kingdom of Great Britain and Ireland) Guernsey	The brigantine was run into by the barque Caroline Sainty ( (United Kingdom of Great Britain and Ireland) Guernsey and sank in the North Sea 6 nautical miles (11 km) south east of Souter Point, County Durham and sank. Her crew survived. Impetuous was on a voyage from Caen, Calvados, France to Seaham, County Durham.
San Juan	Spain	The brigantine stuck a rock and sank off Cabo Mondego, Portugal with some loss of life. She was on a voyage from Torrevieja to Pontevedra.
Servia	United Kingdom	The ship ran aground. She was on a voyage from New York, United States to Liverpool, Lancashire. She was refloated and put in to Newport, Rhode Island, United States.

== 27 December ==
List of shipwrecks: 27 December 1878
Ship	State	Description
Aftenstjernen	Norway	The ship ran aground at Montrose, Forfarshire, United Kingdom. She was on a voyage from Philadelphia, Pennsylvania, United States to Montrose.
Carl	Sweden	The schooner was driven ashore and wrecked at Ottenby, Öland.
Carrick Castle	United Kingdom	The ship was driven ashore at Shanghai, China. She was on a voyage from London to Shanghai. She was refloated.
Freya	United Kingdom	The ship was driven ashore on Læsø. She was on a voyage from Aarhus to Honfleur, Manche, France. She was refloated and taken in to Fredrikshavn in a leaky condition.
Lamperts	United Kingdom	The steamship ran aground in the Øresund. She was on a voyage from Savannah, Georgia, United States to Reval, Russia.
Mabel Jane	(United Kingdom of Great Britain and Ireland) New Zealand	The schooner went aground and was wrecked north of the mouth of the Whanganui River during a gale. Her crew survived.
Norde	France	The ship departed from Dublin, United Kingdom for Havre de Grâce, Seine-Inférieure. No further trace, presumed foundered with the loss of all hands.
Norseman	United Kingdom	The steamship collided with the steamship State of Louisiana (United Kingdom) in the Larne Lough and was beached. Norseman was on a voyage from Glasgow, Renfrewshire to Larne, County Antrim.
Societé	France	The smack was driven ashore at Croyde, Devon, United Kingdom.

== 28 December ==
List of shipwrecks: 28 December 1878
Ship	State	Description
Conatto	United Kingdom	The steamship ran aground at Burntisland, Fife. She was on a voyage from Antwerp, Belgium to Burntisland. She was refloated the next day and taken in to Leith, Lothian for repairs.
Elisa	Denmark	The barque was driven ashore at Hallands Väderö, Sweden.
General Berge	France	The ship was driven ashore near Gravelines, Nord. She was on a voyage from Dunkirk, Nord to Saint Thomas, Virgin Islands. She was refloated and resumed her voyage.
Lord Howe	United Kingdom	The ship departed from Newport, Monmouthshire for Waterford. No further trace, presumed foundered with the loss of all seven crew.
Tunis	United Kingdom	The steamship was driven ashore at Cape Henry, Virginia, United States. She was on a voyage from Galveston, Texas, United States to Liverpool, Lancashire. She was refloated in January 1879.
William and Lucy	United Kingdom	The ship was holed by ice and sank at King's Lynn, Norfolk.

== 29 December ==
List of shipwrecks: 29 December 1878
Ship	State	Description
Estella	United States	The schooner capsized with the loss of all but two of her crew. Survivors were rescued on 19 January by the brig Dorotea (Spain). Estella was on a voyage from Yarmouth, Nova Scotia, Canada to Antigua.
Iris	United Kingdom	The steamship was driven ashore at Point Heraclitza, Ottoman Empire.
Marianne	United Kingdom	The schooner was wrecked on the Beacon Rocks, on the coast of County Durham. Her four crew were rescued by the Sunderland Lifeboat Florence Nightingale ( Royal National Lifeboat Institution). Marianne was on a voyage from London to the River Tyne.

== 30 December ==
List of shipwrecks: 30 December 1878
Ship	State	Description
King Arthur	United Kingdom	The barque was driven ashore in Bannow Bay.
Urbino	United Kingdom	The steamship struck the Galera Reef, off Cádiz, Spain and sank. She was on a voyage from Hamburg, Germany to Cádiz.

== 31 December ==
List of shipwrecks: 31 December 1878
Ship	State	Description
Cowan	United Kingdom	The brig was wrecked at Southwold, Suffolk.
La Plata	United Kingdom	The barque was abandoned in the Atlantic Ocean. Her crew were rescued by Empire (United States). La Plata was on a voyage from New York, United States to Bordeaux, Gironde, France.
Minerve	France	The schooner was wrecked on Morning Point Neck on the Garrison, St Mary's, Isles of Scilly, United Kingdom. Her crew were rescued by rocket apparatus.
Morgan Richards	United Kingdom	The steamship ran aground in the Danube. She was on a voyage from Galaţi, United Principalities to Malta. She was refloated on 2 January 1879 and resumed her voyage.
Rapid	United Kingdom	The schooner departed from Grimsby, Lincolnshire for Gravesend, Kent. No further trace, feared to have been run down and sunk with the loss of all four crew.
Xema	Canada	The barque ran aground at Tralee, County Kerry, United Kingdom. She was on a voyage from Baltimore, Maryland, United States to Tralee. She was refloated.

== Unknown date ==
List of shipwrecks: Unknown date in December 1878
Ship	State	Description
Andes	United Kingdom	The steamship was driven ashore at Barranquilla, United States of Colombia. She was on a voyage from New York, United States to Port-au-Prince, Haiti. She had been refloated by 20 December.
Athens	United Kingdom	The steamship caught fire at New York and was scuttled. She was on a voyage from Philadelphia, Pennsylvania, United States to Liverpool, Lancashire.
Ben Lomond	United Kingdom	The steamship collided with the steamship Ellen at Brăila, United Principalities and was beached. She was on a voyage from Brăila to Marseille, Bouches-du-Rhône, France.
British Enterprise	United Kingdom	The ship arrived at Bombay, India on fire. She was on a voyage from Dundee, Forfarshire to Dundee.
Brothers	United Kingdom	The ship was abandoned at sea before 5 December. She was on a voyage from Charleston, South Carolina to Liverpool.
Carmenita	United Kingdom	The ship was driven ashore in the Gut of Canso. She was on a voyage from an English port to Summerside, Prince Edward Island, Canada.
Cornwall	United Kingdom	The steamship ran into rocks at Land's End, Cornwall. The keel was replaced at Falmouth by Messrs. Harvey and Co.
Countess of Kellie	United Kingdom	The barquentine foundered before 7 December. Her crew were rescued. She was on a voyage from Dordrecht, South Holland, Netherlands to the Rio Grande do Sul.
Eliza Mary	United Kingdom	The barque ran aground on the Haisborough Sands, in the North Sea off the coast of Norfolk. She was on a voyage from North Shields, Northumberland to Villaricos, Spain. She was refloated and towed in to Dover, Kent, where she arrived on 27 December.
Ellen Myvanwy	United Kingdom	The schooner ran aground at Aberayon, Cardiganshire. She was refloated on 3 December.
Frank Queen	United States	The ship was wrecked between the Tonalá River and Santa Anna.
Hooghly	France	The steamship was wrecked on the Castillo Rocks, off Montevideo, Uruguay. She was on a voyage from Bordeaux, Gironde to Montevideo.
Iris	United Kingdom	The schooner was lost whilst on a voyage from Benin City, Lagos Colony to Falmouth, Cornwall. Her six crew were rescued by the barque Alert (Norway).
Kate	United Kingdom	The steamship ran aground off Bermuda and was wrecked. She was on a voyage from Galveston, Texas to Havre de Grâce, Seine-Inférieure, France.
Nimbus	United States	The schooner was wrecked on Cape Negro, Nova Scotia, Canada with the loss of two of her crew.
Northam	United Kingdom	The steamship was destroyed by fire at sea. All on board were rescued. She was on a voyage from London to Sydney, New South Wales.
Octacilius	United Kingdom	The ship was severely damaged by fire at Sackville, New Brunswick, Canada. She was on a voyage from Sackville to Demerara, British Guiana.
Piako	United Kingdom	The ship caught fire in the Atlantic Ocean. Her passengers were taken off. She was on a voyage from London to New Zealand.
Providencia	Spain	The barque was abandoned in the Atlantic Ocean before 10 December.
Scots Craig	United Kingdom	The ship was driven ashore in the Firth of Forth. She was on a voyage from Burntisland, Fife to Matanzas, Cuba. She was refloated with the assistance of a tug.
Servia	United Kingdom	The steamship ran aground. She was on a voyage from New York to London. She was refloated and put in to Newport, Maine in a leaky condition.
Sotir	France	The brig was driven ashore at "Tour St. Louis". She was refloated and towed in to Marseille.
Sprite of the Plym	United Kingdom	The barque departed from Curaçao for the English Channel on 5 December. No further trace, presumed foundered with the loss of all ten crew.
Venice	United Kingdom	The barque was driven ashore and severely damaged in Courtenay Bay, Canada. She was on a voyage from Ostend, West Flanders, Belgium to Saint John, New Brunswick.
Unnamed	Switzerland	A steamship sank under the weight of snow on Lake Zurich
Unnamed	Switzerland	A steamship sank under the weight of snow on the lake at Zug.
Unnamed	United Kingdom	The ship was driven ashore at Tierra del Fuego, Chile before 14 December. She was on a voyage from Australia to an English port. An attack on her crew by the local inhabitance was repulsed with assistance from the corvette Magallanes (Chilean Navy).
