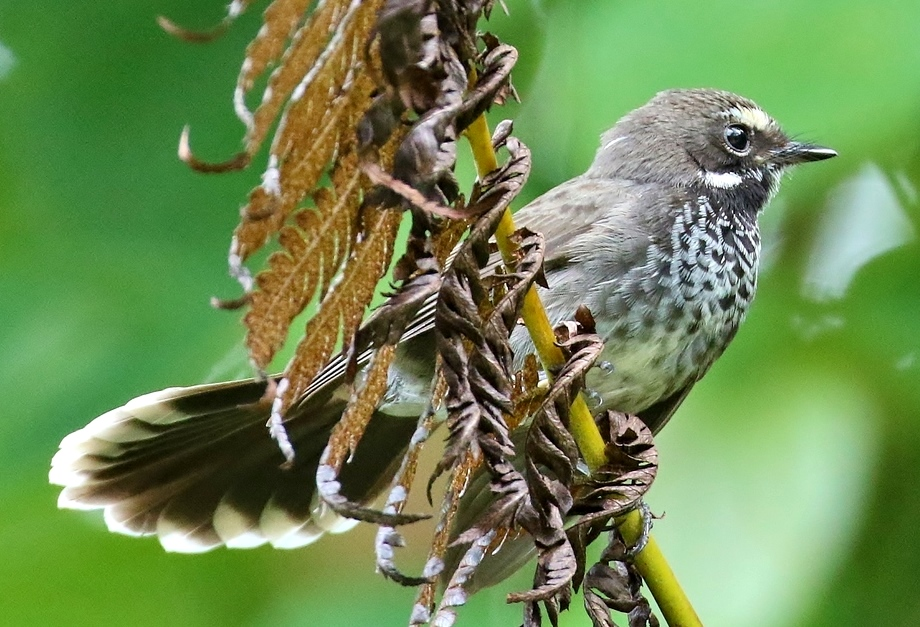

Conservation status
- Least Concern (IUCN 3.1)

Scientific classification
- Kingdom: Animalia
- Phylum: Chordata
- Class: Aves
- Order: Passeriformes
- Family: Rhipiduridae
- Genus: Rhipidura
- Species: R. kubaryi

Binomial name
- Rhipidura kubaryi Finsch, 1876

= Pohnpei fantail =

Species of bird

The Pohnpei fantail (Rhipidura kubaryi) is a fantail, known as the Likepsir in Pohnpeian, which is endemic to the Pacific island of Pohnpei in the Federated States of Micronesia. It is a bird commonly found in forests and at forest edges. It feeds on insects which it gathers by gleaning amongst foliage or by making short dashes while in the air.

It is a small bird (15 cm) with a long, fan-shaped tail which is often fanned or wagged. The plumage is mostly dark grey with a white eyebrow, moustache and tips to the tail feathers. The belly is white and the breast is blackish with white feather edges giving a scaly appearance.

The species is closely related to the rufous fantail (Rhipidura rufifrons) but it is darker and duller in appearance with a different song and feeding behaviour.

The scientific name commemorates the Polish naturalist Jan Kubary.
