= Museum Godeffroy =

Museum in Hamburg, Germany

Museum Godeffroy, Hamburg

The Museum Godeffroy was a museum in Hamburg, Germany, which existed from 1861 to 1885.

Papilio godeffroyi in Seitz The Macrolepidoptera of the World (bottom row) The species was named to honour Johann Cesar Godeffroy by Georg Semper

The collection was founded by Johann Cesar VI. Godeffroy, who became a wealthy shipping magnate a few years after the expansion of the trade towards Australia and the South Seas. His expert collectors and captains brought back to Hamburg zoological, botanical and ethnographic material. Captains of vessels, traders and missionaries received exact instructions and appropriate equipment so that they could collect soft bodied animals into alcohol, properly set butterflies or beetles, and prepare bird and mammal skins and skulls. Herbarium instructions and mineral collecting kits were also issued. Duplicate or unwanted parts were sold.

Throughout the museum's history it also sold human skulls from the Pacific regions (including Australia) where the company had a monopoly. This was very profitable. Anthropometry and "Missing Link" theories required especially Aborigine skulls and these were sold to scientific institutions and museums worldwide. The more important material was sold to Otto Finsch and Rudolf Virchow, then pre-eminent German physical anthropologists.

The museum opened in 1861 in parts of the Kontorhäuser (Counting House Building) of the company "J. C. Godeffroy & son". The exhibition on two floors covered the natural history, ethnography and anthropology of the South Seas. Mammals, birds, reptiles, fish, amphibians, butterflies, beetles and other insects, marine life (especially shells), masks, totems, costume, weapons, personal ornament and anthropological subjects, aboriginal skulls, photographs of native peoples and so on were displayed in small cases. Larger items, such as boats and reconstructed houses, stood free. Admission was weekdays from 11 to 14 o'clock for one Mark, and on the weekends from 10 to 14 o'clock for 50 Pfennig.

Experts in various fields ("Auftragssammler") were employed on expeditions and for scientific examination and other work on the collection. They included Eduard Heinrich Graeffe, Amalie Dietrich, Johann Stanislaus Kubary, Richard Parkinson, Andrew Garrett, Eduard Dämel, Franz Hübner, Alfred Tetens and Theodor Kleinschmidt, among others.

The overall curator was Johann Schmeltz (1839–1909). In addition, he provided 1865 and 1881 sales catalogs and edited the Journal des Museum Godeffroy. A number of binomial names were published for the first time in these publications giving them significance in classification. The Semper brothers, also from Hamburg, Otto (1830–1907), Karl (1832–1893) and Georg (1837–1909) played an important part in the assembly and conservation of the museum's holdings. Georg named the rare Samoa butterfly Papilio godeffroyi for Johann Godeffroy.

After the discontinuation of all payments in Dec. 1879 the museum existed further as it did not belong to the company J.C. Godeffroy & Son anymore. Dr. Wilhelm Godeffroy became the owner for a grant to the company. Since 1881 the museum had been threatened in its existence, as all buildings should be pulled down in the area. The abridgement began 1885. The same year in which Cesar Godeffroy died, Dr. Wilhelm Godeffroy finished the negotiations without reaching his wish, to keep the collection in its own rooms in Hamburg.

A large number of exhibits and specimens survive today in the Museum für Völkerkunde zu Leipzig (now merged with the Staatlichen Ethnographischen Sammlung Sachsens and containing 5000 objects comprehensive for Micronesia and Fiji and including objects from Melanesia and Polynesia); the Museum für Völkerkunde Hamburg; the Ethnological Museum of Berlin; the Pitt Rivers Museum in Oxford; and the D'Arcy Thompson Zoology Museum in Dundee. There is also zoological material in the Biozentrum Grindel und Zoologisches Museum, the Museum für Naturkunde, Berlin, the Museo Civico di Storia Naturale di Trieste and the Naturhistorisches Museum in Vienna.The Godeffroy Collection of Australian and South Pacific insects is in the Victoria Museum in Melbourne, Australia.The zoological material supports Faunistic of Oceania and Australasia

Johann Schmeltz, the former curator was already a co-worker of the Ethnographic Museum in Leiden (now the Rijksmuseum voor Volkenkunde), which had purchased parts of the ethnographic collection.

== Journal des Museum Godeffroy ==
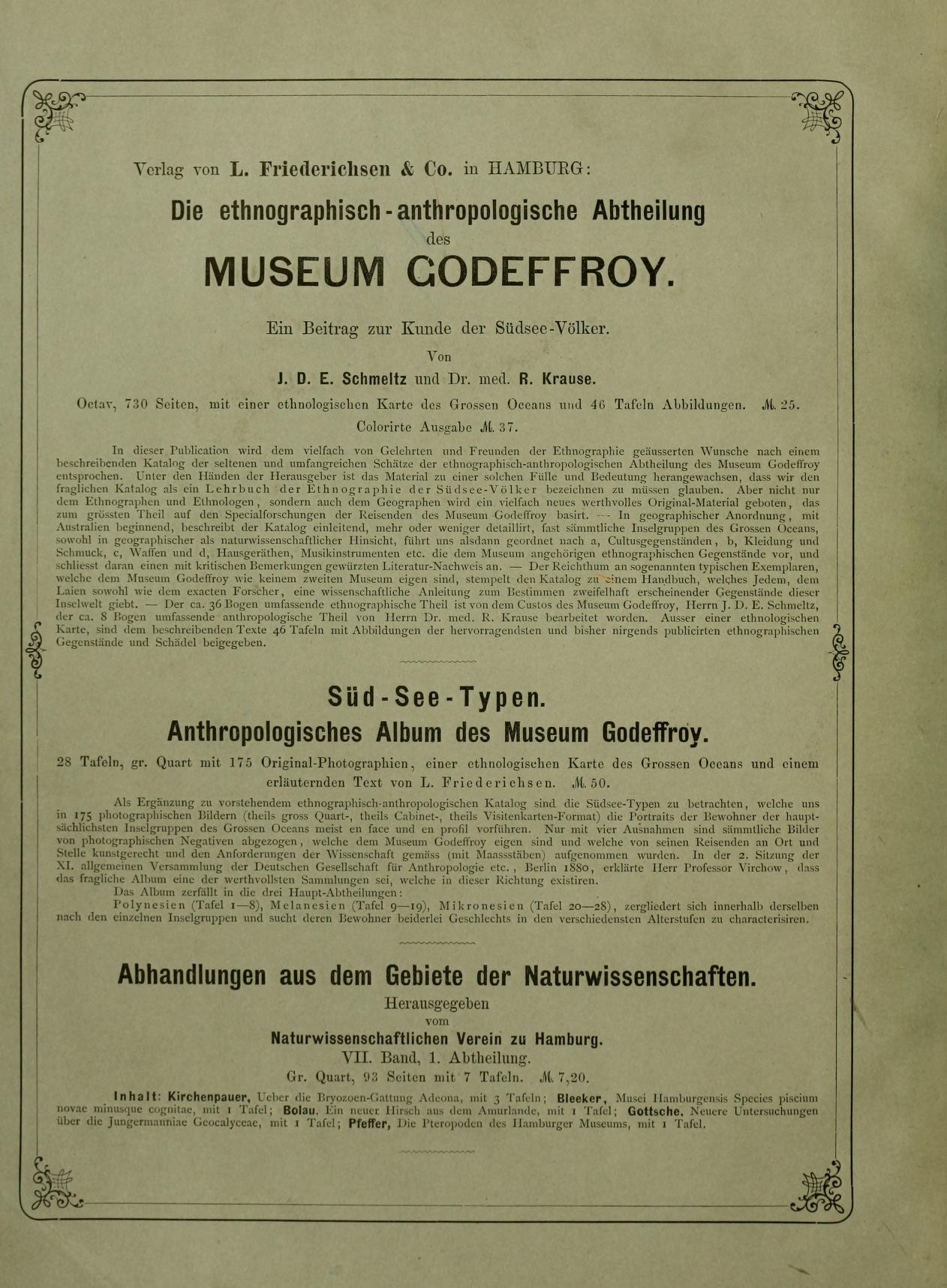
Journal Museum Godeffroy Advertisement

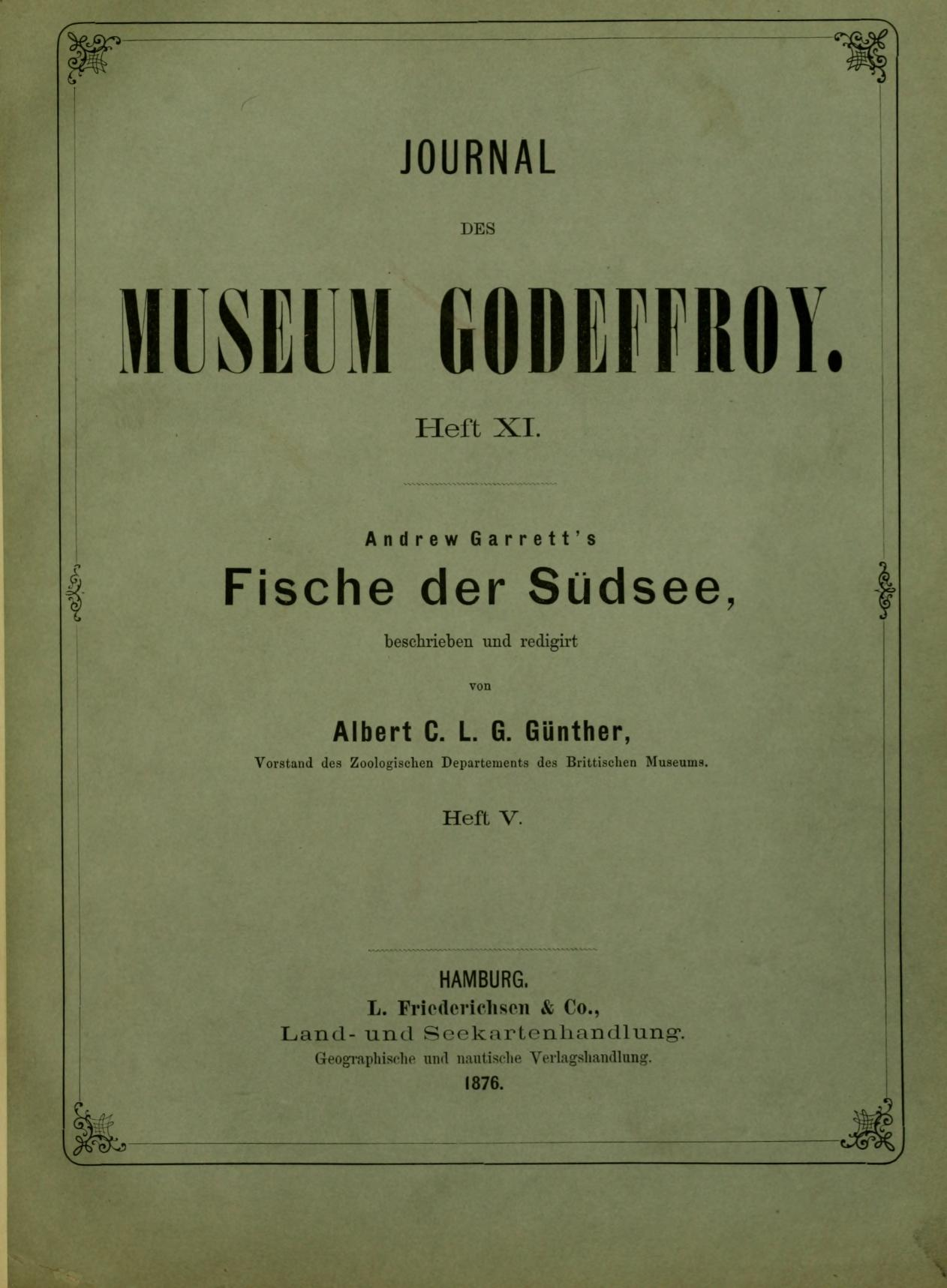
Title page

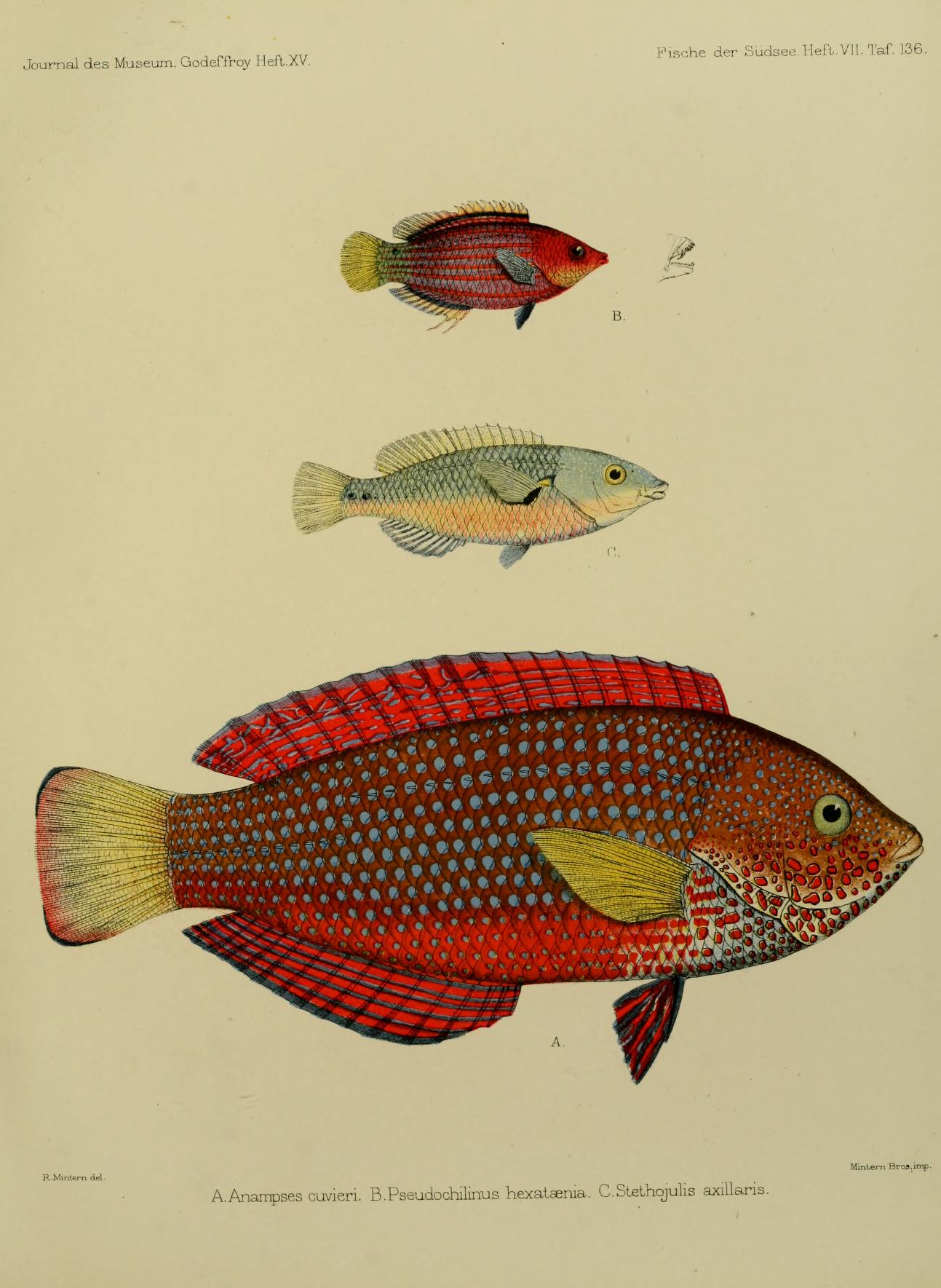
Fische der Sudsee

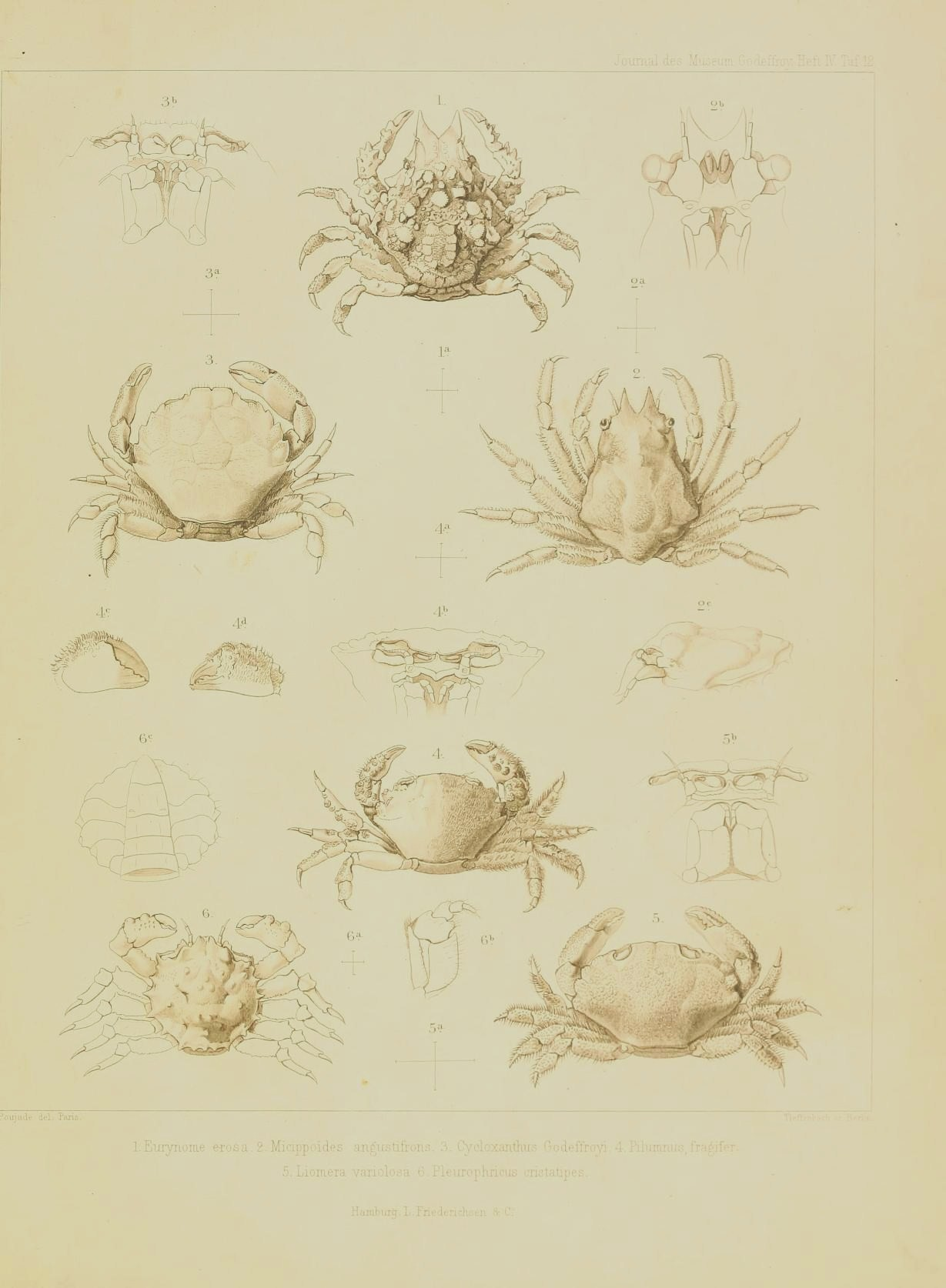
Description de quelques Crustaces nouveaux

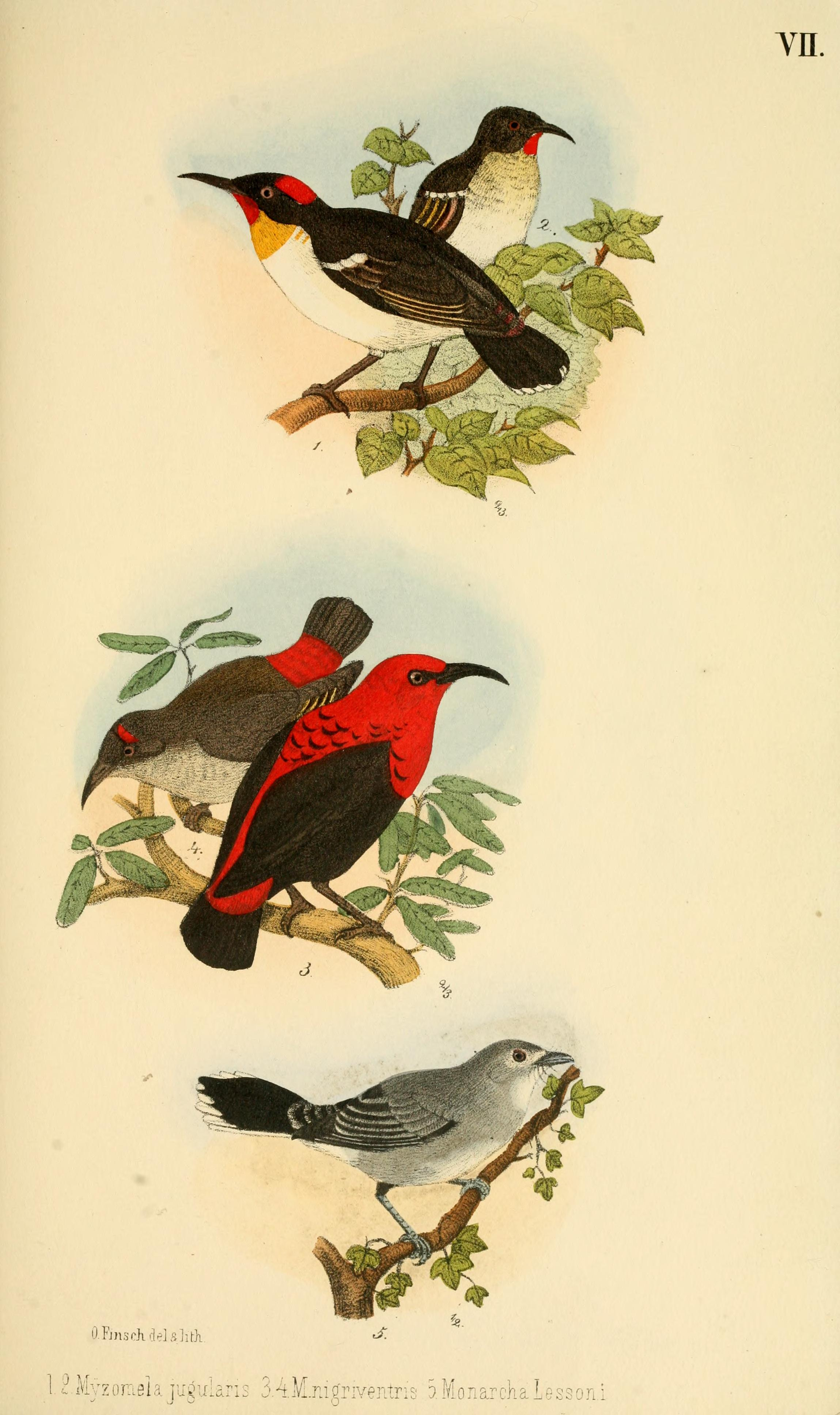
Beitrag zur fauna Centralpolynesiens Ornithologie der Viti-, Samoa- und Tonga-inseln

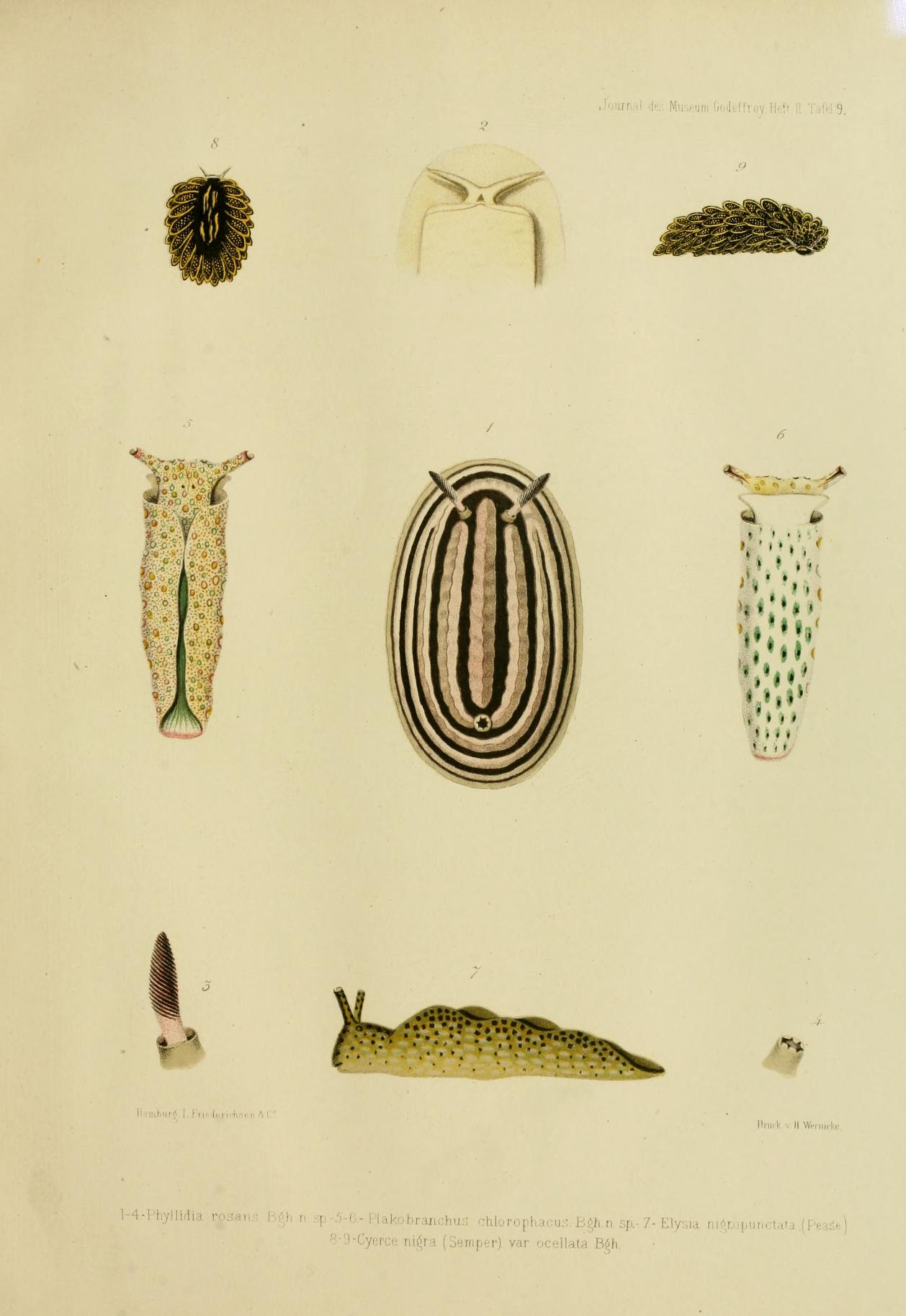
Neue Nacktschnecken der Südsee

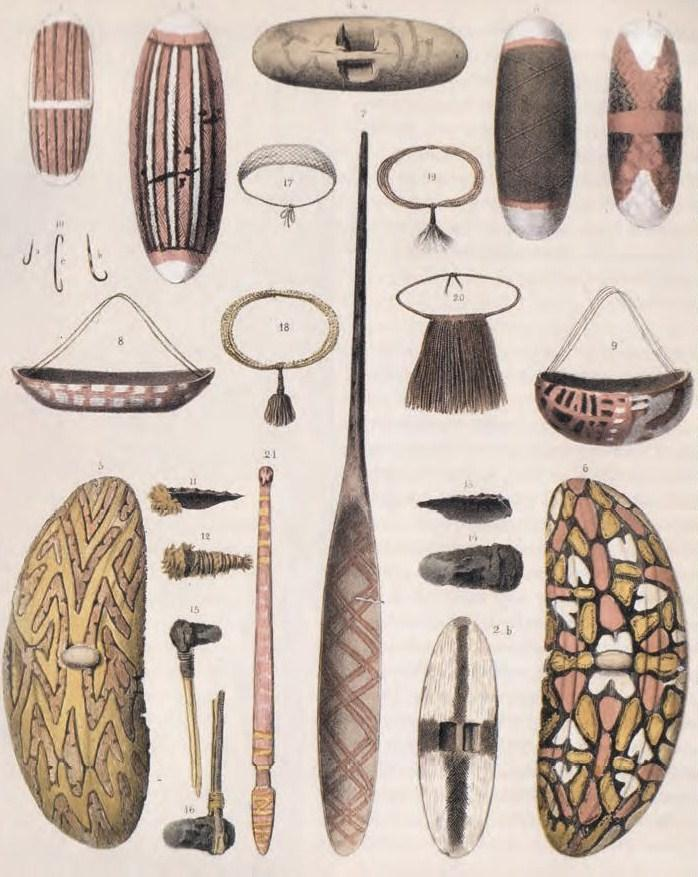
Australische Kunstgegenstände aus Queensland

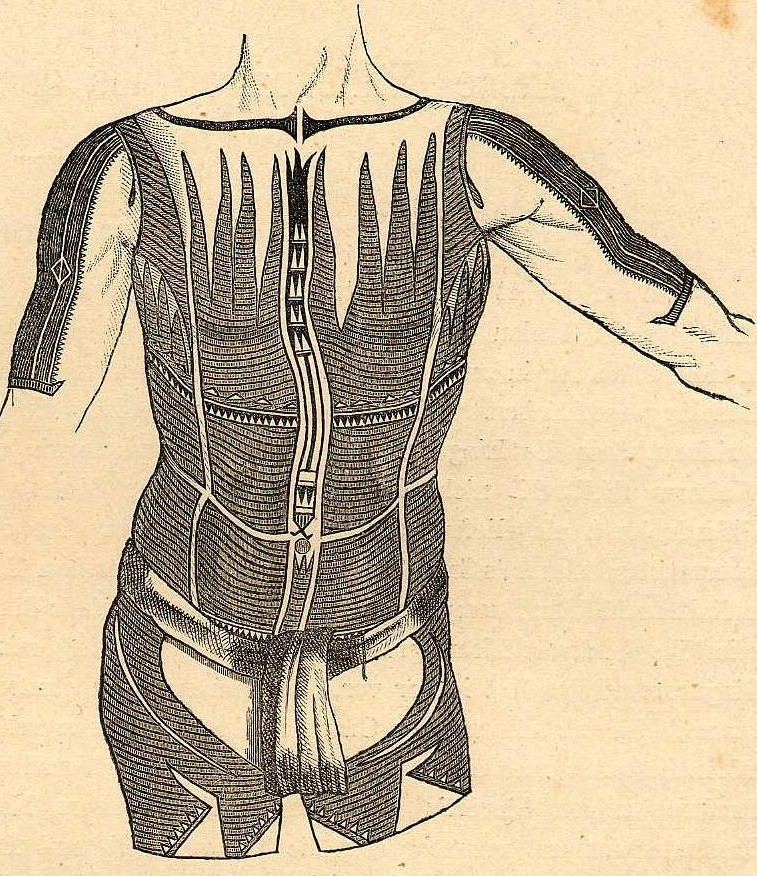
Männliche Tattoo e Karolinen Archipel

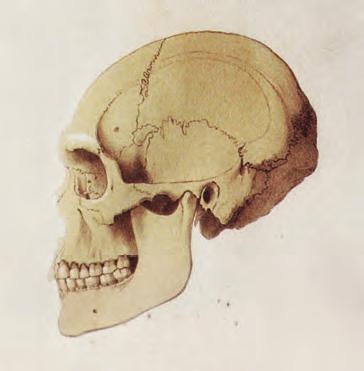
Schädel von Skelett No. 9800 aus Bowen, Queensland

== Literature ==
- Henry A. Ward: Museum Godeffroy. In: Popular Science Monthly, Volume 8, 1. April 1876, (englisch).
- Rüdiger Bieler, Richard E. Petit: Molluscan taxa in the publications of the Museum Godeffroy of Hamburg, with a discussion of the Godeffroy Sales Catalogs (1864–1884), the Journal des Museum Godeffroy (1873–1910), and a history of the museum, Zootaxa, Magnolia Press, 2012, ISSN 1175-5334, (PDF).
- Engelhard, Jutta Beate and Mesenhöller, Peter (Hrsg.) 1996 Bilder aus dem Paradies. Koloniale Fotografie aus Samoa 1875 - 1925. 176 Seiten, Jonas Verlag, Marburg ISBN 3-89445-184-X.
- Fülleborn, Susanne Die ethnographischen Unternehmungen des Hamburger Handelshauses Godeffroy, 202 S., Magisterarbeit, Univ. Hamburg, 1985.
- Glenn Penny, H. Objects of culture : ethnology and ethnographic museums in Imperial Germany, Chapel Hill/London: University of North Carolina Press 2002.
- Kranz, Helene 2005 Das Museum Godeffroy, 1861-1881 Naturkunde und Ethnographie der Südsee. Eine Publikation des Altonaer Museums. marebuchverlag ISBN 3-927637-47-5.
- Lederbogen, Jan 1992 Ethnographische Photographie: das Beispiel Museum Godeffroy, 278 S., Magisterarbeit, Univ. Hamburg, 1992
- Scheps, Birgit 2005 Das verkaufte Museum. Die Südsee-Unternehmungen des Handelshauses Joh. Ces. Godeffroy & Sohn, Hamburg, und die Sammlungen Museum Godeffroy. Goecke & Evers, Keltern-Weiler (Abhandlungen des Naturwissenschaftlichen Vereins in Hamburg; N.F., 40) ISBN 3-937783-11-3.
- Schmeltz, J. D. E. und Krause, R. 1881 Die Ethnographisch-Anthropologische Abtheilung des Museum Godeffroy in Hamburg : ein Beitrag zur Kunde der Südsee-Völker, 687 Seiten u. 46 Taf., Friederichsen, Hamburg.
