= Teten =

Teten is both a given name and a surname. Notable people with the name include:

== Given name ==
- Teten Masduki (born 1963), Indonesian social activist

== Surname ==
- Howard Teten (1932–2021), American former instructor at the FBI Academy

== See also ==
- Tetens
