= Alfred Tetens =

- Born: July 1, 1835
- Died: January 13, 1903 (aged 67); Hamburg, Prussia, German Empire
- Occupation: South Seas explorer

Alfred Tetens (1 July 1835, in Wilster – 13 January 1903, in Hamburg) was a German captain, South Seas explorer and Senator of Hamburg.

== Life ==
Tetens was the son of a Justizrat (senior counsel) and senator in Danish services. For many years he captained sailing boats on Hamburg's two lakes, the Binnenalster and the Außenalster, but in the middle of the 1860s he went to Micronesia on behalf of Hamburg shipping owner and merchant Johann Cesar VI. Godeffroy, then seeking material for Museum Godeffroy which exhibited (and sold) ethnographic and natural history material. In 1869 Tetens established the first permanent trading post of J. C. Godeffroy & Sohn. This was on Yap and the enterprise became particularly influential in economic regard. The most important commercial product was copra. Tetens later directed the office of the Wasserschout (which managed the central hiring of seamen) of the Hamburgische Admiralität and eventually became a Senator of the "Free and Hanseatic city of Hamburg". In 1891 he was also joint founder of the German Seaman's Mission in Hamburg.

== Works ==
- Among the savages of the South Seas; memoirs of Micronesia, 1862-1868. Reprinted. Stanford, Stanford University Press, 1958.
- with Johann Kubary and Eduard Gräffe The Carolines island of Yap or Guap according to the reports of Alfred Tetens and Johann Kubary "Die Carolineninsel Yap oder Guap nach den Mittheilungen von Alf. Tetens und Johann Kubary" Microform Reprint New Haven, Conn.
- with Semmy Steinberg Vom Schiffsjungen zum Wasserschout Erinnerungen aus d. Leben d. Capitäns Alfred Tetens; nach seinen Aufzeichnungen Hamburg Niemeyer 1889
