= Eduard Heinrich Graeffe =

Swiss zoologist and naturalist (1833–1916)

Eduard Heinrich Graeffe or Gräffe (27 December 1833, Zurich – 23 April 1916 Ljubljana) was a Swiss zoologist and naturalist. As an entomologist, he specialised in Hymenoptera, Diptera and Hemiptera.

From around 1860, Graeffe was in the employ of Johann Cesar VI. Godeffroy, a wealthy shipping magnate from Hamburg. Graeffe was hired in order to organize Godeffroy's natural history collection as a scientific museum, the "Museum Godeffroy". From 1862 to 1873, he was based in Samoa, conducting scientific research and collecting specimens from throughout the South Pacific. Among his writings of the expedition was: Reisen im Innern dei Insel Viti Levu (in: Neujahrsblatt der Naturforschende Gesellschaft in Zürich auf das Jahr 1868, Nr. 70).

From 1875 to 1898, he worked as an inspector at the Zoological Station in Trieste. The Fiji whistler (Pachycephala graeffii) is named in honor, as is Arthrocormus graeffii, a botanical species described by German bryologist Karl Müller.

== Selected works ==
- Beobachtungen über Radiaten und Würmer in Nizza, 1858 - Observations of Radiata and worms in Nice.
- Das Susswasser-Aquarium. (1861) - The freshwater aquarium.
- Reisen nach verschiedenen Inseln der Südsee 1867-68 - Journeys to different islands in the South Seas.
- Reise im Innern dei Insel Viti-Levu. Neuejahrblatt der Naturforschende Gesellschaft in Zurich 70: 1-48. (1868) - Journey in the interior of Viti Levu. Translated into English by Stefanie Vuikabe Waine and published as "Travels in the interior of Vitilevu" (1986).
- Ueber eine Sendung Vögel aus Huahine, 1873 - About an avian shipment from Huahine.
- Topographie von Samoa, 1873 - The topography of Samoa.
- Samoa oder die Schifferinseln. 1873 - Samoa or the Schiffer Islands.
- Algen der Fidschi-, Tonga- und Samoa-Inseln, gesammelt von Eduard Graeffe, 1874 (with Albert Grunow) - Algae from Fiji, Tonga and Samoa.
- Coelenteraten, 1882 - Coelenterata.
- Ueber die Sprache, Sitten und Gebräuche der Samoaner, 1888 - On the language, customs and other particulars of Samoans.
- Contributo alla Fauna dei Ditteri dei dintorni di Trieste. S.1-25. Trieste (1895), (with A. Funk).
- Übersicht der Grabwespen (Fossores) des Küstenlandes, (1912).
- Die Carolineninsel Yap oder Guap nach den Mittheilungen von Alf. Tetens und Johann Kubary, (Microform Reprint New Haven, Conn.) - The Carolines island of Yap or Guap according to the reports of Alfred Tetens and Johann Kubary.

== Collections ==
Initially Graeffe's insect collection was in Das Museum Godeffroy in Hamburg. This collection was sold and Graeffe's specimens (and the material he had worked on) were divided between Museo Civico di Storia Naturale di Trieste (Hymenoptera, Diptera, Orthoptera and Hemiptera) and the Naturhistorisches Museum (Hymenoptera, Orthoptera Diptera and Hemiptera). At least some material also ended up in the Museum für Naturkunde in Berlin.
