= Iserbrook (ship) =

Brig built in 1853

Coordinates: 33°51.490′S 151°13.367′E

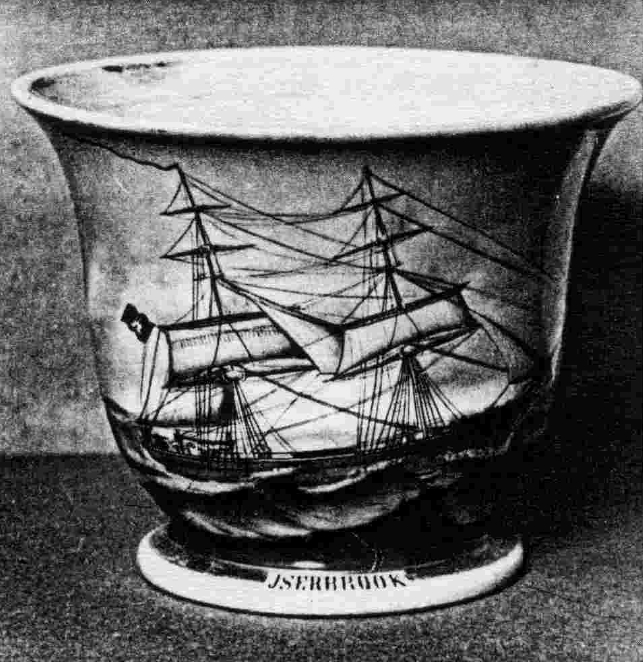
- A Sailor's Mug with the image of the Brig Iserbrook

History
- Name: Iserbrook
- Owner: Johan César VI. Godeffroy 1853–74 John Bell 1874–80
- Port of registry: Hamburg (1853–74); (United Kingdom) Sydney (1874–80) 20/1874
- Ship registration number: unknown later 20/1874
- Ship official number: 69750
- Builder: Reiherstieg Schiffswerfte & Maschinenfabrik Joachim Eduard von Somm Hamburg Germany
- Launched: 1853
- Completed: 15 June 1853
- Fate: Burned and scuttled 21 December 1878 Refloated 1879 Sank 30 January 1880 Wreck destroyed with explosives October 1880

General characteristics
- Type: Brig
- Tonnage: 207.75 GRT
- Length: 110.4 feet (33.65 m)
- Beam: 25 feet (7.62 m)
- Height: 10.8 metres (35.43 ft)
- Decks: One and a half

Iserbrook was a general cargo and passenger brig built in 1853 at Hamburg (Germany) for Joh. Ces. Godeffroy & Sohn. It spent over twenty years as an immigrant and general cargo vessel, transporting passengers from Hamburg to South Africa, Australia and Chile, as well as servicing its owner's business in the Pacific. Later on, the vessel came into Australian possession and continued sailing for the Pacific trade. In 1878 it caught fire and was sunk the same year. At last, it was re-floated and used as a transport barge and hulk in Sydney until it sank again and finally was blown up.

== Construction and description ==
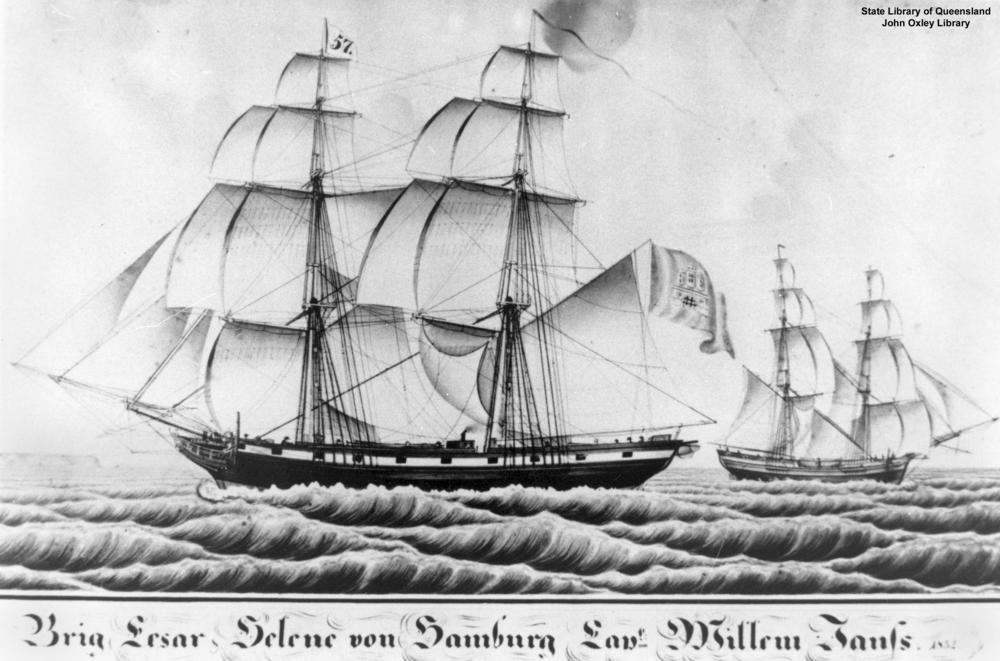
The 240 ton Brig Cesar & Helene was built in 1855/56 in the Godeffroy shipyard at the Reiherstieg wharf. This vessel was just 30 tones larger and built one year after the Iserbrook for the same owners

The vessel was built for the Hamburg trading company Joh. Ces. Godeffroy & Sohn. At the time, the enterprise was operated by Johan César VI. Godeffroy who had large trading interests in the Pacific, focussing mainly on Copra, Coconut oil and luxuries like pearlshell. In the 1850s and 60s, the company was also strongly associated with emigration from Germany to Australia, especially to Adelaide and Brisbane.

In its original Hamburg registration (Bielbrief), the Iserbrook was described as being a "Brigg". As base measurements were given:

- Ship length (at keel) = 105.00 Hamburgh ft (30.03 m)
- Ship beam = 22.11 Hamburgh ft (6.32 m)
- Ship height (abdominal plank to deck) = 13.70 Hamburgh ft (3.92 m)
- Ship tonnage = 90.00 Hamburgh Kommerzlasten (270 t)

According to its 1874 Australian registration the ship ran as a wooden framed carvel brig with two masts, one and a half decks and a square stern. Its base measurements according to this source were:

- Ship length = 110.4 feet (33.65 m)
- Ship beam = 25 feet (7.62 m)
- Ship height = 10.8 metres (35.43 ft)
- Ship tonnage = 207.75 gross register tons (GRT)

== 1853 to 1874 German service history ==
=== 1853–55 Captain J. J. Krüger ===
The vessel's first major journey was made under command of Captain J. J. Krüger as a migration voyage, departing from Hamburg on 23 November 1853, and arriving at Port Adelaide on 13 March 1854. At the latter date, approximately 79 immigrants were on board.

During its time in Port Adelaide, a John Bosh and a Mr. Christian where apprehended under a warrant and charged with being absent without leave from the Iserbrook. The pair denied the charge, and stated they had gone to town to obtain from Mr. Amsberg, German Consul, some papers they wanted to take home, and that they were willing to return on board. By request of Captain Krüger, both man were ordered to be detained at the police station till the vessel was ready to proceed to sea (which was the same afternoon). From Port Adelaide, the brig continued to Batavia (Dutch East Indies) via Melbourne.

Four months later, on 19 August 1854, the vessel had returned from Batavia to Melbourne with 200 tons of rice and 600 packages of coffee. It proceeded to Valparaiso (Chile), from there to China and finally back to Hamburg.

=== 1855–60 Captain F. Kock ===
After having departed from Hamburg on 3 May 1855, the vessel sailed to Australian waters another time and arrived in Melbourne in September the same year. Messrs. E. Visbeck and C. Wegener were recorded as passengers in the cabin and eighty-seven (unnamed) in the steerage. From Melbourne, the Iserbrook set sail for Valparaiso via Sir Charles Hardy Islands on 8 September. It carried part of its original cargo from Hamburg, and partly run in ballast.

The Iserbrook next made its way from Hamburg on 23 May 1856. This time, it reportedly brought 103 German immigrants to Moreton Bay (Australia), all of which were in good health and described as a respectable and industrious looking class of people. There was one birth on board during the voyage and no deaths. According to The Moreton Bay Courier the immigrants spoke in high terms of the captain's kind treatment during the passage. For its return to Hamburg, the Iserbrook sailed for Hong Kong in ballast, and afterwards visited several ports at the Eastern coast of South America, before setting off to its final destination. This was reached, as was the usual route, by circumsailing Cape Horn.

In 1858, the Iserbrook made a migration voyage to Valdivia, Talcahuano and Valparaiso, carrying about 150 passengers. After completion, the brig was renamed to 'Inca' in Hamburg and newly registered under Chilenian Flag. In 1859, another voyage to Valdivia and Valparaiso followed, after which the ship's name was switched back to Iserbrook in early 1860.

A subsequent voyage with 123 days at sea led again to Chile, aiming this time for Puerto Montt which was reached on 1 November. Ninety-three German settlers were landed, of whom seventy-eight travelled on Government's account (assisted immigration) and fifteen on their own. During the voyage one passenger, Mathilde Haltenhof von Sülzer, a seventeen-year-old, died a natural death.

=== 1861 Captain J. H. W. Steinholz ===
Servicing the South Australian Assisted Immigration Scheme, after another passage from Hamburg the Iserbrook arrived in Port Adelaide on 25 May 1861. The brig brought a next group of passengers, including twenty-nine whose friends had arranged for their immigration by Amsberg & Co in the colony. The vessel also carried twelve Saxony Merino rams, similar to such which were imported by Amsberg & Co at an earlier stage. On its return voyage, the vessel visited Auckland (New Zealand) and Valparaiso, before command was handed over to Captain P. Schinkel in Hamburg.

=== 1863 Captain P. Schinkel ===
Under Schinkel's command, the Iserbrook set sail for Adelaide once more; this time the destination was reached via Port Louis (Mauritius). Whilst in South Australia, Henry Meggers and Hans C. Hanson, seamen of the Iserbrook, were charged with being absent from board without leave. They were committed to one month of imprisonment each. Also prior to sailing, the Marine Board investigated into a damage of the brig, having proceeded to the anchorage at Snapper Point and further on to the Lightship. Here it was discovered the vessel had five feet of water in her hold and was making six inches more per an hour. Back in port and having taken her on a slip, a hole in the bottom was found, by appearance caused by the vessel itself settling on her anchor at low water.

After repair the Iserbrook arrived in Auckland in October 1864 where cabin boy John Luctzens stood trial and pleaded guilty of being absent without leave, resulting in four weeks of imprisonment. The brig finally continued to Guam (Mariana Islands) with a cargo of flour.

=== 1865–69 Captain F. M. Schultze ===
After returning to Hamburg and changing command, the vessel arrived in Port Adelaide again on 23 September 1865. This time warrants were issued against crew members Johann Moller and August Schweitzer, having deserted the brig without leave. From Port Adelaide, and with F. M. Schultze still in command, the Iserbrook now set sail for her first journey midst into the Pacific. After touching Apia (Samoan Islands), Captain Schultze returned to Hamburg via South America and set off for Apia again in early 1866. For the rest of the year and in 1867, the Iserbrook exclusively serviced Joh. Ces. Godeffroy & Sohn's South Sea trade in the Eastern Pacific by cruising between Samoa and the Caribbean. During 1868, some voyages to the Western part of the Pacific followed. Command was most likely handed over on a subsequent visit to America in early 1869.

=== 1869–70 Captain J. J. F. Meyer ===
The vessel under new command of J. J. F. Meyer arrived from the "South Sea Islands" in Sydney on 23 August 1869. Meyer continued to Auckland the following month and set sail back to the South Seas. The vessel arrived in Sydney for a second time in September 1870. From here, Captain Meyer continued to Petropaulovski in February the following year with a cargo of spirits, treacle, bags of rice, and cases of axes. In April 1871, the Iserbrook was reported to be at anchor in Koror, being the main harbour of Palau for foreign ships at the time. Some sources state Captain Meyer was still in command, other suggest a hand-over at an earlier stage.

=== 1872–74 Captain Georg Christoph Levison ===
Midst 1872, Captain G. C. Levison was in command of the Iserbrook, visiting the headquarters of Godeffroy & Sohn on Yap (Caroline Islands). Here, beachcomber Thomas Shaw was taken on board as a resident-trader to be on an island of the New Britain Archipelago. On Pohnpei (Caroline Islands) a similar agreement was made with William T. Wawn to be stationed at Ta, Satawan Atoll for the Godeffroy Company in early June. Only a few days afterwards the vessel visited Ebon in the Marshall Group, a stop-over on its way to Hermit Islands (Western Islands) where Thomas Shaw was landed on Manofe.

The vessel returned to Ta in 1873, arriving on 16 February to put ashore another trader. This was in replacement for William T. Wawn, who, together with former manager of Godeffroy's Yap station, John Nash, was to be landed on New Britain to extend the Company's trading network.

Captain Brodie, the late muster of schooner Lavinia, reported in late September that the Iserbrook had established two stations at New Britain, "one of the South Sea Islands". According to Brodie, the men landed were on the island for three months, when an attack was made by the natives, who destroyed the station by fire; and the men escaped with their lives, making for Duke of York Island, which they providentially reached in a boat, and, after remaining there for two months, were taken off by the schooner Lucy, belonging to Campbell and Co. of Sydney.

The author George Lewis Becke described the incident as:

The German firm opened that station at Mutávat two years ago, they asked me to take charge of it. I wouldn't. I knew what the natives down there are. Two of the firm's own men went down with a lot of New Ireland niggers as a sort of bodyguard. A month afterwards, when the Iserbrook brig went down to get their copra, they found that the two Dutchmen and every man Jack of the New Ireland niggers had been killed and eaten, and the station looted.

After having landed Wawn and Nash, the Iserbrook set sail for Palau, returning from there to the Mortlock Islands in July or August with naturalist John Kubary aboard. Kubary was landed on Pohnpei shortly afterwards, and after another visit to Yap the Iserbrook continued to Apia, arriving here on 15 December 1873. Christmas was spent at the Samoa Islands, and the brig left harbour for Sydney on 3 February 1874. According to other sources, a short-trip to the Line Islands was made in-between.

Port Jackson of Sydney was reached on 27 February 1874, having aboard as passengers a Mrs. Williams with 5 children and 2 servants, and a Mr. Williams Itabone. Next day, the brig was advertised for sale.

== 1874–1878 Australian service history ==
According to German sources, the Iserbrook was sold to a "Marsdin" in Sydney in early 1874. Possibly related to this, the brig was purchased by John Bell on 1 June the same year. John Bell was a shipwright located in Balmain who also built and operated the Shipwright's Arms Hotel.

As well as being a shipwright and publican, John Bell ran a pearling station utilising south sea divers at Jarvis Island (now Mabuiag Island) which had been established in 1871 and by the mid 1870s was running 4 foot pumped dive boats and 5 free swimming dive boats and employing about 100 men in the Torres Strait.

=== 1874 Captain Joseph Frazer ===
Joseph Frazer had been operating with John Bell for a number of years and on 11 April 1875, he was operating a pearling boat, for the John Bell, and based at Jervis Island (now Mabuiag Island) in the Torres Strait, he was anchored off Night Island (Queensland) and some men were sent ashore to find water. The landing party came across a group of Aborigines accompanied by a white man and reported the encounter to the captain. Joseph Frazer sent his men back with some things to barter in exchange for the white man. It was found that Narcisse Pelletier had been a castaway for 17 years.

In November 1877 he was in command of the Iserbrook from Melbourne when departing for the South Sea Islands with 41 native divers.

=== 1878 Captain Martin ===
In June 1879 Captain Alfred Martin aged 39 years leaving behind a wife and a son late of Auckland died of a cholera, and two men had died of fever and ague reported by the chief officer Mr. Fryar.

As the vessel had lost its master, leaving no certificated officer, on board it was escorted back to Sydney by HM Schooner Renard bringing back a numerous crew of South Sea Islanders, engaged for a pearling expedition these over one hundred natives where suffering from sickness aboard and the vessel was quarantined.

=== Fire and sinking ===
On 21 December 1878, Iserbrook was berthed at Roundtree's Dock in Darling Harbour at Sydney with three people aboard: her captain, Joseph Frazer; her first mate, Mr. Hampshire, and her sailmaker, Mr. Barron. At about 4;00 p.m., the three men went into the store room to procure grog. Captain Frazer pulled the plug from a cask, thinking it contained molasses, but it contained rum, which began to spill into the room. The men struck matches to find their way in the darkness, and one of the matches fell onto the spilled onto the spilled rum, which caught fire. The fire spread quickly; Hampshire and Barron escaped, but Frazer was trapped in the store room and died in the fire. Iserbrooke was scuttled in the harbor in an attempt to control the fire, but this was only partly successful, and the portion of the ship above water level continued to burn for some time until the local fire department could extinguish. Captain Frazer's remains eventually were recovered after the ship was pumped out and raised early in 1879. Iserbrook′s damaged hulk remained afloat in the harbor until 30 January 1880, when it sank again. Deemed not worth further salvage efforts in July 1880, the wreck was destroyed with explosives in October 1880.

=== Wreck site and wreckage ===
The wreck is located right in the heart of the city off Lady Macquarie's Chair and was found on 12 October 2013 after following up on some side scan information of the area in approximately 14 meters of water.

The only visible signs of wreckage were several pieces of iron about 300mm by 300mm by 1500mm and some pieces of mechanical equipment as well as several areas of what appeared to be almost shell "middens" which are associated with where the wood has had shells growing on it but as the wood rotted only leaving a pile of shells.
