= Johann Cesar VI. Godeffroy =

German trader, blackbirder and Hanseat (1813–1885)

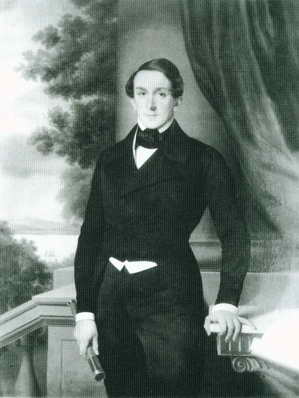
Johan Cesar VI. Godeffroy at the family estate on Elbchaussee (c. 1847), oil on canvas by Robert Schneider

Johann Cesar Godeffroy (7 July 1813 in Kiel – 9 February 1885 in Blankenese) was a German trader. He was the founder of Museum Godeffroy.

== Family history and the trading company J.C. Godeffroy & Sohn ==
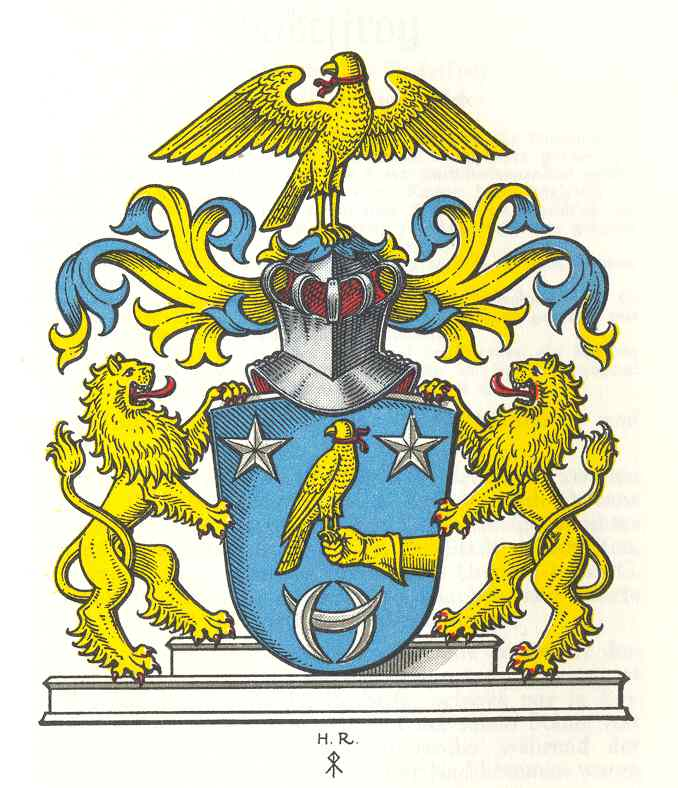
Family coat of arms

House flag of J.C. Godeffroy & Sohn

The Godeffroys were French Huguenots of La Rochelle. In 1737 they were forced to flee France to avoid religious persecution after events following the Edict of Fontainebleau in 1685. The family sought asylum in Prussia and finally settled in the port city of Hamburg, founding a trading empire known as J.C. Godeffroy & Sohn. At first the trade was in Western Europe and the West Indies with textiles as export item; the goods returning to Hamburg included copper, coffee, wine, figs, and sugar from Cuba. Under Johann Cesar VI Godeffroy outposts were established in Havana and in Valparaíso. He built a fleet of trading ships that, at its peak, numbered 29 deep water sailing vessels and some 100 smaller ships.

Among these ships were the barques Johann Caesar, Peter Godeffroy, La Rochelle, Wandram, Suzanne, Iserbrook, Victoria, and until the economic crisis of 1857, the renowned American-built clipper Sovereign of the Seas. In 1855, trade was expanded into the Pacific following negotiations by Godeffroy's agent in Valparaíso, August Unselm. He sailed out to the Navigator Islands, The Friendly Islands, Fiji, and finally Tahiti.

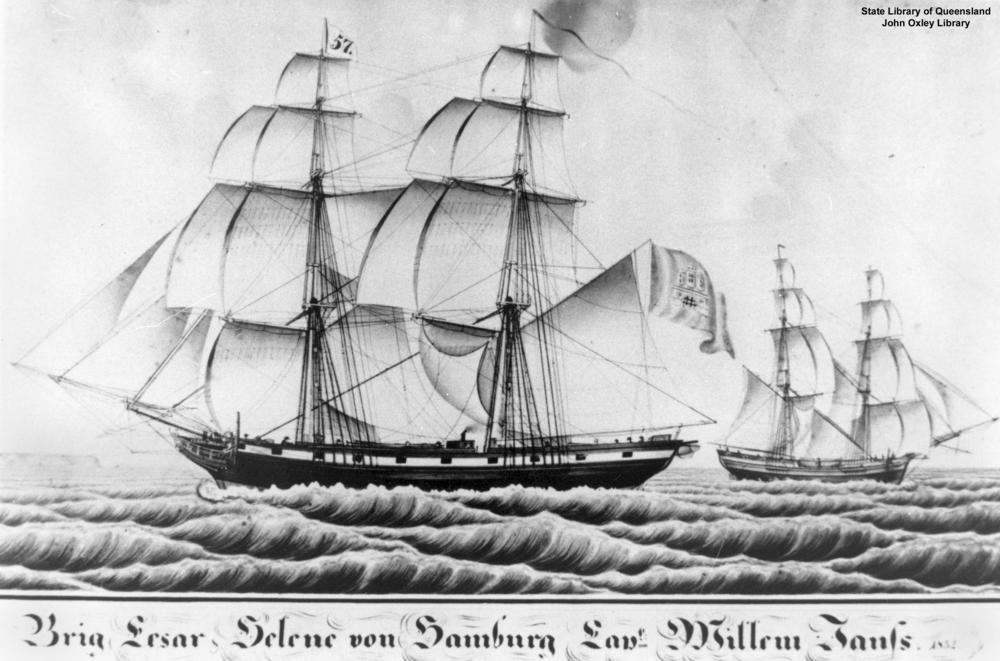
Cesar & Helene

The trading business in the Pacific was very profitable and new outposts and plantations were established on many Pacific Islands. The goods were copra, coconut oil and luxuries such as pearl, as well as slaves (see blackbirding). In 1857, a central outpost, directing Pacific operations was established at Apia. Johann Godeffroy was also able to take advantage of an immigration scheme to Southern Africa and between October 1859 and September 1883 no less than 36 ships sailed for southern Africa, bringing hundreds of German families to the Western Cape, the Eastern Cape, British Kaffraria and Natal.

After the financial crash of the late 1850, the firm supplemented its revenue by taking on passengers to the Australian gold rush and the California gold rush. The German imperial government utilized the Godeffroy company as part of its colonial policy in the Pacific Islands. Nevertheless, in 1878, the company went bankrupt due to speculations with German mining stocks and then emerged as Deutsche Handels- und Plantagen Gesellschaft der Südseeinseln zu Hamburg, or DHPG, with continuity and management by Godeffroy personnel.

== Johann Cesar Godeffroy ==
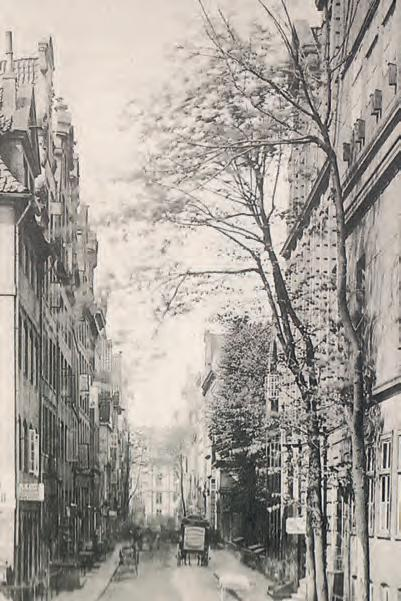
Old Wandrahm Strasse in 1880

Johann Godeffroy attended the town school of Katharineum of Lübeck from about 1821 to 1830, as did his younger brothers and his older brother Gustav Adolph. He then trained at Parish & Co., whose owner Richard Parish was married to Susanne Godeffroy, a daughter of Peter Godeffroy, brother of his grandfather. An internship in England followed. Towards the end of 1835, he joined his father's company, "J.C. Godeffroy & Sohn" and, on 1 January 1837, he became a shareholder.

After the death of his father Johann Cesar Godeffroy (1781–1845) on 3 July 1845 he took over the company. In this year he was elected to the Hamburg Chamber of Commerce. From 1846, the company negotiated partnerships and mergers with various companies notably "Elb-Kupferwerk" (copper ore processors) and "Reiherstieg Hermann V. Roos" (shipbuilders). In 1857 he took control of the newly established "L. R. Beit, Gold-und Silber-Affinerie" now Aurubis AG. Other business arrangements were made with "Tesdorf FJ & Son", "Elbhütte Affinir- und Handelsgesellschaft" and "Elb-Zuckersiederei" (sugar refiners). In these years also co-founded the North German Bank and the North German Insurance Company. Due to lack of liquidity the company J.C. Godeffroy & Sohn at the end of 1879 began legal process with its creditors. This took over 30 years but finally in 1913 the company name "J.C. Godeffroy & Sohn" was erased from the Register.

On 2 February 1837 Johann Cesar Godeffroy married Emily Hanbury (1815–1894) whose family had close trading ties with Livorno. The couple had five children, with Johann Cesar Godeffroy (1838–1912), the eldest son. His brother Gustav Godeffroy was a Senator for the city of Hamburg in the Frankfurt National Assembly and Chairman of the Supervisory Board of Norddeutsche Bank. His brother, Adolph Godeffroy in 1847 was co-founder of the passenger line "Hamburg-Amerikanischen Packetfahrt-AG“ (HAPAG)" (HAPAG) and until 1880 the presiding director.

During the winter months the family lived in the upper floors of a house in the Old Wandrahm inside Hamburg, office spaces occupied the lower floor. This house was built around 1760. The rest of the year they lived far outside the city Dockenhuden, today a part of Blankenese in a cottage built by the Danish architect Christian Frederik Hansen in 1789 Landhaus J. C. Godeffroy.

In June 1836, with his younger brother, Adolph, Carl Merck, Charles Parish, Dr. Edward Sieveking, Dr. Johann Gustav Heckscher and five other enthusiasts he founded the Hamburg Rowing Club. It is the oldest rowing club on the European continent and still exists today. From 1859 to 1864, he sat as a member of the Hamburg Parliament.

== Südseekönig, South Sea King ==
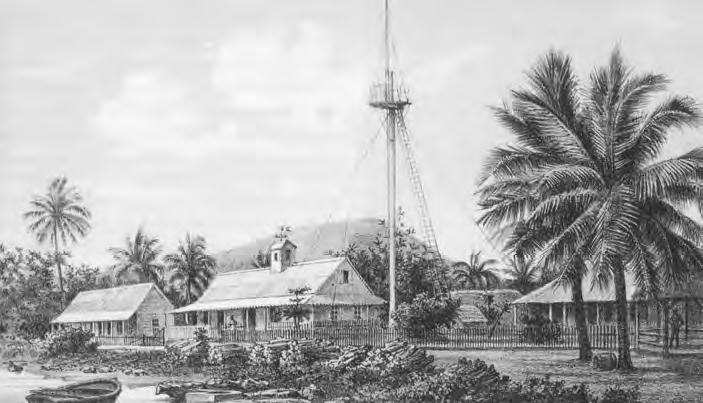
German Consulate Apia

Starting Pacific trading in Cochin-China and supported by merged, partner companies, share-holders (including Otto von Bismarck) and bankers in Hamburg and under the close direction of Johann Caesar Godeffroy the company was soon throughout the South Seas, with centres of operation at Apia and Valparaiso, and a fleet of trading barques, brigs and schooners, which traded through the islands from China to the Pacific coast flying the company colours – a white flag with a ribboned golden dove on a blue horizontal bar with golden stripes, below the bar is a blue inscription: J.C.G. & S.

In Apia, the company supplied arms and ammunition from an armaments subsidiary at Liege. These were supplied to the warring factions on Apia in exchange for 10,000 hectares (25,000 acres) of the finest alluvial soil soon transformed into plantations of, mainly, copra or coconut oil, pearl-shell or sea-island cotton. These were worked by over 1,000 labourers imported from Melanesia. Another plantation of 1,200 hectares (3,000 acres) was later started at Yap in the Pelew Group and, in 1873, trading posts were established in the Bismarck archipelago.

In 1865, in the Ellice Group (now Tuvalu), the company obtained a 25-year lease to the eastern islet of Niuoku of Nukulaelae Atoll. For many years the islanders and the company argued over the lease, including its terms and the importation of labourers, however the company remained until the lease expired in 1890.

At Apia they had a shipbuilding yard and repairing sheds. The ships never insured and their captains were paid commission of three per cent, on the net profit of each voyage. Ships always left Apia under sealed orders to disguise their intentions from competitors. More innovative was the introduction of debased South American currencies as the sole means of exchange so controlling the money.

== The Establishment of the Museum Godeffroy ==
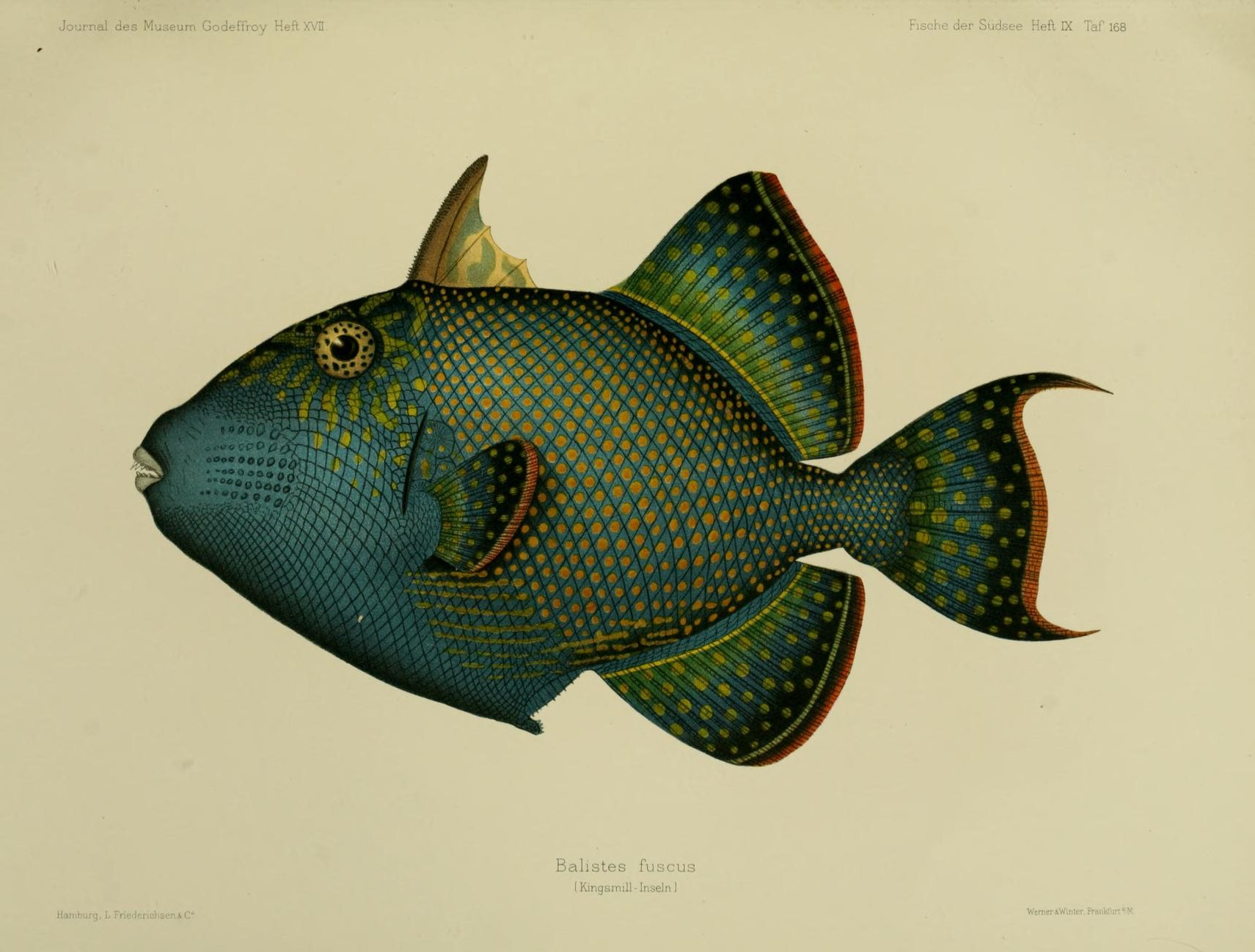
Fische der Südsee Journal Museum Godeffroy

Beginning as a personal collection of birds, shells, fish, and other animals, as well as cultural objects from all localities visited by the Godeffroy ships, Godeffroy's natural history cabinet grew in size until it occupied a cluttered warehouse. It was time to find a proper place to house, list, organize, and finally display them to a fascinated public, and in 1860 Godeffroy wrote to Dr. Eduard Heinrich Graeffe (1833–1919) in Switzerland to request his services in founding a museum. The 28-year-old Swiss zoologist accepted and boarded a train for Hamburg in 1861.

After a short time the Museum Godeffroy was founded, and Graeffe was sent to the Pacific in October 1861 to supervise the acquisition of more material. Graeffe settled in Apia and directed the Godeffroy operations there for the next decade while also collecting in Tahiti, Fiji, Tonga, Australia, Samoa, and other South Pacific Islands. Other scientific collectors were hired by the company who, working in different areas of the Pacific Ocean, helped increase the holdings of the Museum with their successful collecting of birds, mammals, fishes, shells, butterflies, beetles and other insects, plants, and ethnographic objects. The museum also functioned as a natural history dealership. On the establishment of the museum, Godeffroy was made an honorary member of the Berliner Gesellschaft für Anthropologie, Ethnologie und Urgeschichte.

== Legacy ==
Johann Cesar VI. Godeffroy is commemorated in the scientific name of a species of lizard, Hypsilurus godeffroyi.

== Bibliography ==
- Cooper, H. Stonehewer (1882). "Chapter XXVII. Godeffroy and Co., the South Sea Kings". pp. 231-239. In: Cooper, H. Stonehewer (1882). The Islands of the Pacific their Peoples and their Products. A New and Revised Edition of 'Coral Lands' for Circulation in Australia. London: R. Bentley.
- Bollard AE (1981). "The financial adventures of J.C. Godeffroy and Son in the Pacific". Journal of Pacific History 16 (1): 3–19.
- Penny, H. Glenn (2002). Objects of Culture: Ethnology and Ethnographic Museums in Imperial Germany. Chapel Hill and London: University of North Carolina Press.
- Spoehr, Florence Mann (1963). White Falcon, the House of Godeffroy and Its Commercial and Scientific Role in the Pacific. Palo Alto, California: Pacific Books.
- Kennedy, Paul M. (1974). The Samoan tangle. A study in Anglo-German-American relations, 1878–1900. New York: Barnes & Noble.
- See also the German bibliography.
