= John Stanislaw Kubary =

Polish naturalist and ethnographer

- Jan Stanisław Kubary
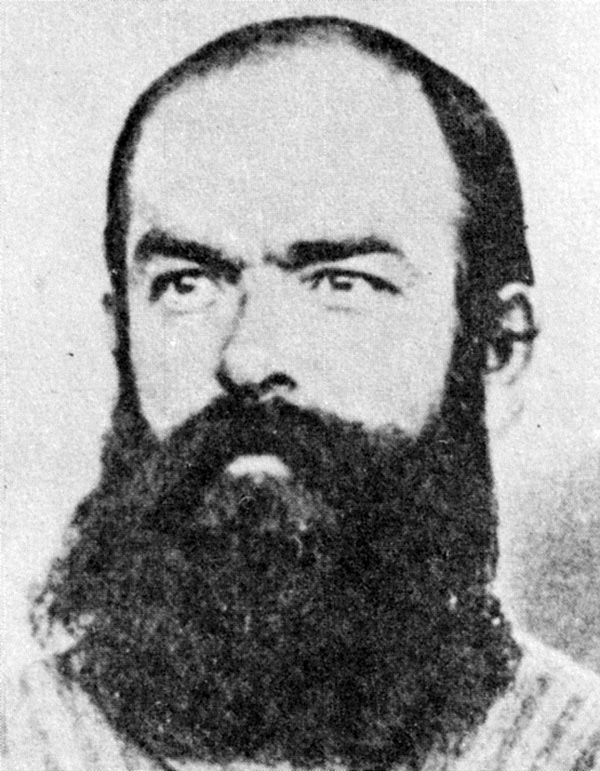
- Born: 13 November 1846; Warsaw, Congress Poland
- Died: 9 October 1896 (aged 49); Pohnpei or Manila
- Spouse: Anna Yelliott
- Children: 2

John Stanislaw Kubary (13 November 1846 in Warsaw, Congress Poland – 9 October 1896 in Pohnpei or Manila, Philippines) also stated as Jan Stanisław Kubary, Jan Kubary, or Johann Stanislaus Kubary, was a Polish naturalist and ethnographer.

== Biography ==
Kubary was born in Warsaw on 13 November 1846, where he was raised by his stepfather and studied at the University of Warsaw. A participant in the January Uprising of Poles against Russian rule, Kubary ultimately fled to Germany after it failed, and in 1869 he signed a five-year contract to collect for the Museum Godeffroy in Hamburg.

He first spent six months living in Apia, Samoa and making trips to Fiji and Tonga while also learning Samoan and sending items back to the museum. In 1870 he traveled to the Ellice Islands (today Tuvalu), Gilbert Islands, and Marshall Islands, where he compiled a dictionary of the dialect spoken in the Ebon Islands. He led a successful response to an influenza epidemic in Palau, which created good relations between himself and the Palauans and assisted his ethnographic research.

In 1873 he arrived in the Marshall Islands and Caroline Islands and wrote a description of the Nan Madol archaeological site. He collected a hundred crates of material, but most of it was lost in a shipwreck on Jaluit. A small amount was salvaged, and after more collecting on Jaluit and Samoa he sent 23 crates of material back to the museum.

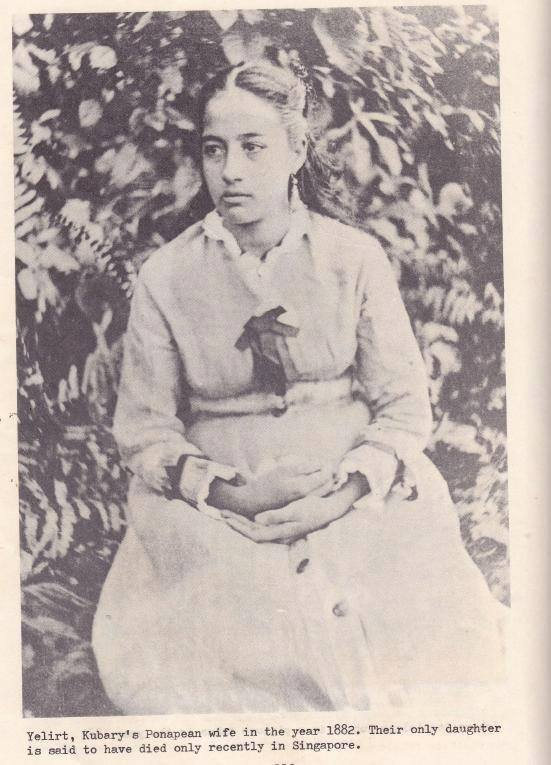
Anna Yelliot, Kubary's wife

He arrived in Australia in 1875, and quickly became a naturalized citizen. He returned to Hamburg, lectured in Lwów (Lviv), and renewed his contract for another five years. He made a home on the island of Pohnpei, and used it as a base for his collecting. While collecting in Truk, he was informed that the Museum Godeffroy had released him from his contract due to a shortage of funds. He then returned to his plantation home and married Anna Yelliot. After a hurricane destroyed his home in 1882, he moved to Japan and worked for museums in Tokyo and Yokohama, along with collecting for museums in Leiden and Berlin. In 1885 he found work as an interpreter on the German warship Albatros and took over management of a plantation on Matupit.

He traveled to Europe in 1892 and again lectured in Lwów but returned to Polynesia after he failed to find work. He died in 1896, either on his plantation in Pohnpei, or in Manila, Philippines.

== Legacy ==
Kubary documented at least four bird species: the Samoan wood rail (Gallinula pacifica), the Mariana crow (Corvus kubaryi), the Caroline Islands ground dove (Gallicolumba kubaryi), and the Pohnpei fantail (Rhipidura kubaryi), as well as numerous insects, among them the paradise birdwing butterfly (Ornithoptera paradisea).

The peak Mount Kubari on New Guinea is named after him.

== Works ==
- with Alfred Tetens and Eduard Gräffe The Carolines island of Yap or Guap according to the reports of Alfred Tetens and Johann Kubary "Die Carolineninsel Yap oder Guap nach den Mittheilungen von Alf. Tetens und Johann Kubary" Microform Reprint New Haven, Conn.
- Die Palau-Inseln in der Suedsee: Das Palau Geld, 49–53. Journal des Museum Godeffroy, I, 4. Hamburg (1873)
- Weitere Nachrichten von der Insel Ponape (Carolinen-Archipel) Journal des Museum Godeffroy Heft VII. Hamburg, L. Friedrichsen & Co. pp. 129–135 (1875)
- Ethnographische Beitraege zur Kenntnis des Karolinen Archipels, Heft 1: Ueber das Einheimische Geld auf der Insel Yap und auf den Palau-Inseln Leiden (1889)
