= Thrupp =

Thrupp, a variant of the Middle English word thorp, meaning hamlet or small village, and may refer to:

== People ==
- Arthur Thomas Thrupp (1828–1889), English Royal Navy officer
- Darren Thrupp (born 1966), Australian Paralympic athlete
- Dorothy Ann Thrupp (1779–1847), English writer
- Frederick Thrupp (1812–1895), English sculptor
- George Athelstane Thrupp (1822–1905), English coachbuilder
- John Thrupp (1817–1870), English historian
- Joseph Francis Thrupp (1827–1867), an English churchman and academic
- Sylvia L. Thrupp (1903–1997), English-born, Canadian-American historian

== Places in the United Kingdom ==
- Thrupp, Gloucestershire, a village and civil parish in Stroud District
- Thrupp, Oxfordshire, a hamlet near Kidlington in Cherwell District
