= Thorp (disambiguation) =

A thorp is a hamlet or village.

Thorp or THORP may also refer to:

== Places ==
=== United Kingdom ===
- Thorp, former hamlet, now within Royton, Greater Manchester
- Thorp Arch, West Yorkshire, a small village and civil parish near Wetherby
- Thorp Perrow Arboretum, North Yorkshire
- Thorp Academy

=== United States ===
- Thorp, Michigan, ghost town
- Thorp, Washington
- Thorp, Wisconsin, a city
- Thorp, Clark County, Wisconsin, a town
- Thorp Branch

=== Antarctica ===
- Thorp Ridges

== People ==
- Thorp (surname)
- Gil Thorp, fictional protagonist of eponymous American sports-oriented comic strip

== Other uses ==
- Thermal Oxide Reprocessing Plant, THORP, a nuclear fuel reprocessing plant
- Thorp Records
- Thorp T-18 and other aircraft designed by John Thorp

== See also ==
- Francis-Jones Morehen Thorp
- Peddle Thorp
- Thorpe (disambiguation)
- Dorf (disambiguation)
- Dorp (disambiguation)
