= Thorpe =

Thorpe is a variant of the Middle English word thorp, meaning hamlet or small village.

Thorpe may refer to:

== People ==
- Thorpe (surname), including a list of people with the name

== Places ==
=== England ===
- Thorpe, Cumbria
- Thorpe, Derbyshire
- Thorpe, East Lindsey, Lincolnshire
- Thorpe, East Riding of Yorkshire
- Thorpe, North Yorkshire
- Thorpe, Nottinghamshire
- Thorpe, Surrey
- Thorpe Arnold, Leicestershire
- Thorpe Bay, a suburb in Essex
- Thorpe by Trusthorpe, Lincolnshire
- Thorpe by Water, Rutland, East Midlands
- Thorpe Constantine, Staffordshire
- Thorpe Culvert, a hamlet in Lincolnshire
- Thorpe Hamlet, Norwich, Norfolk
- Thorpe Hesley, South Yorkshire
- Thorpe in Balne, South Yorkshire
- Thorpe in the Fallows, Lincolnshire
- Thorpe Latimer, Lincolnshire
- Thorpe-le-Soken, Essex
- Thorpe le Street, East Riding of Yorkshire
- Thorpe Mandeville, Northamptonshire
- Thorpe Market, Norfolk
- Thorpe-next-Haddiscoe, Norfolk
- Thorpe on the Hill, Lincolnshire
- Thorpe on the Hill, West Yorkshire
- Thorpe St Andrew, Norfolk
- Thorpe St Peter, Lincolnshire
- Thorpe Satchville, Leicestershire
- Thorpe Thewles, County Durham
- Thorpe Tilney, Lincolnshire
- Thorpe Waterville, Northamptonshire
- Thorpe Willoughby, North Yorkshire

=== Elsewhere ===
- Thorpe, Missouri, a community in the United States

== See also ==
- Burnham Thorpe, Norfolk
- Crownthorpe, Norfolk, England
- Crownthorpe, Queensland, Australia
- Kilton Thorpe, Redcar and Cleveland, England
- Littlethorpe, Leicestershire, England
- Littlethorpe, North Yorkshire, England
- Little Thorpe, County Durham, England
- Little Thorpe, West Yorkshire, a location in England
- Lower Thorpe, Northamptonshire
- Shiptonthorpe or Shipton Thorpe, East Riding of Yorkshire
- Thorpeness, Suffolk, England
- Thorpe Park (disambiguation)
- Dorf (disambiguation)
- Dorp (disambiguation)
- Number sign on a telephone dial, also known as octothorp or octothorpe
