= Thorpe (surname) =

Thorpe is a surname derived from the Middle English word thorp, meaning hamlet or small village. Thorpe is found as the name of many places in England.

Notable people with the surname include:

- Adam Thorpe (born 1956), British author
- Adelbert Delos Thorp (1844–1919), American politician in Wisconsin
- Aidey Thorpe (born 1963), English footballer
- Amy Elizabeth Thorpe (1910–1963), American BSC, MI6, and OSS agent during WWII
- Alma Thorpe (born 1935), Aboriginal Australian activist and elder
- Ashley Thorpe (born 1975), Australian cricketer
- Benjamin Thorpe (1782–1870), English scholar of Anglo-Saxon
- Billy Thorpe (1946–2007), Australian rock and roll musician
- Chris Thorpe (born 1970), U.S. Olympic luge athlete
- Clarence Thorpe (baseball) (1909–1985), American Negro league pitcher
- David Thorpe (artist) (born 1972), English artist
- David Thorpe (footballer) (born 1948), Australian rules footballer
- David Thorpe (motorcyclist), British motorcycle racer, 500cc Motocross World Champion in 1985, 1986 and 1989
- D. R. Thorpe (1943–2023), British historian and biographer
- Drew Thorpe (born 2000), American baseball player
- Ethel L. M. Thorpe (1908–2001), British-Canadian nurse
- Frank Thorpe (public servant) (1885–1967), Australian senior public servant
- George Thorpe (disambiguation), several people
- Graham Thorpe (1969–2024), English cricketer
- Harriet Thorpe (born 1957), English actress
- Heath Thorpe (born 2000), Australian artistic gymnast
- Hugh Thorpe, English MP
- Ian Thorpe (born 1982), Australian swimmer
- Jeremy Thorpe (1929–2014), British politician, MP and leader of the Liberal Party
- Jerry Thorpe (1926–2018), American TV and film director
- Jim Thorpe (1888–1953), U.S. athlete
- Jim Thorpe (Canadian football) (1944–2020), Canadian football player
- Jim Thorpe (golfer) (born 1949), American professional golfer
- Jimmy Thorpe (1913–1936), English professional footballer
- Jimmy Thorpe (footballer, born 1879) (1879–1956), English professional footballer
- Jocelyn Field Thorpe (1872–1939), British chemist
- John Thorpe (1565–1655), English architect
- John Wells-Thorpe (1928–2019), English architect
- Kay Thorpe (born 1935), British romantic novelist
- Laura Thorpe (born 1987), French tennis player
- Lee Thorpe (born 1975), English footballer
- Lewis Thorpe (1913–1977), British academic
- Lewis Thorpe (baseball) (born 1995), Australian baseball player
- Lidia Thorpe (born 1973), Australian politician
- Marjorie Thorpe, Trinidadian academic, lecturer and former diplomat
- Marjorie Thorpe (Aboriginal Australian), daughter of Alma Thorpe and mother of Lidia Thorpe
- Mathew Thorpe (born 1938), senior judge in the Court of Appeal of England and Wales
- Matilda Thorpe (born 1960), English actress
- Otis Thorpe (born 1962), American professional basketball player
- Percy Thorpe (1899–?), English footballer
- Richard Thorpe (1896–1991), American film director
- Richard Thorpe (rugby union) (born 1984), English rugby union player
- Robert Thorpe (disambiguation), several people
- Rose Hartwick Thorpe (1850–1939), American writer
- Samuel Thorp or Thorpe (1765–1838), English clockmaker
- Thomas Thorpe (c. 1569 or 1570 – 1635?), Elizabethan publisher of Shakespeare's sonnets
- Thomas Edward Thorpe (1845–1925), British chemist
- Tom Thorpe (born 1993), English footballer
- Tommy Thorpe (1881–1953), English footballer and cricketer (where he is known as Thomas Thorpe)
- Tony Thorpe (born 1974), English footballer and manager
- William de Thorpe, 14th-century English Chief Justice
- William Thorpe, putative author of 1407 Lollard text The Testimony of William Thorpe
- William Homan Thorpe (1902–1986), British ethologist

== Pop culture ==
- Xavier Thorpe from Wednesday.

== See also ==
- Thorpe (disambiguation)
