= Joseph Thrupp =

Joseph Thrupp may refer to:

- Joseph Thrupp (died 1821), coachbuilder with Thrupp & Maberly
- Joseph Francis Thrupp (1827–1867), English churchman and academic
