= Mies Bouwman =

Dutch television presenter (1929–2018)

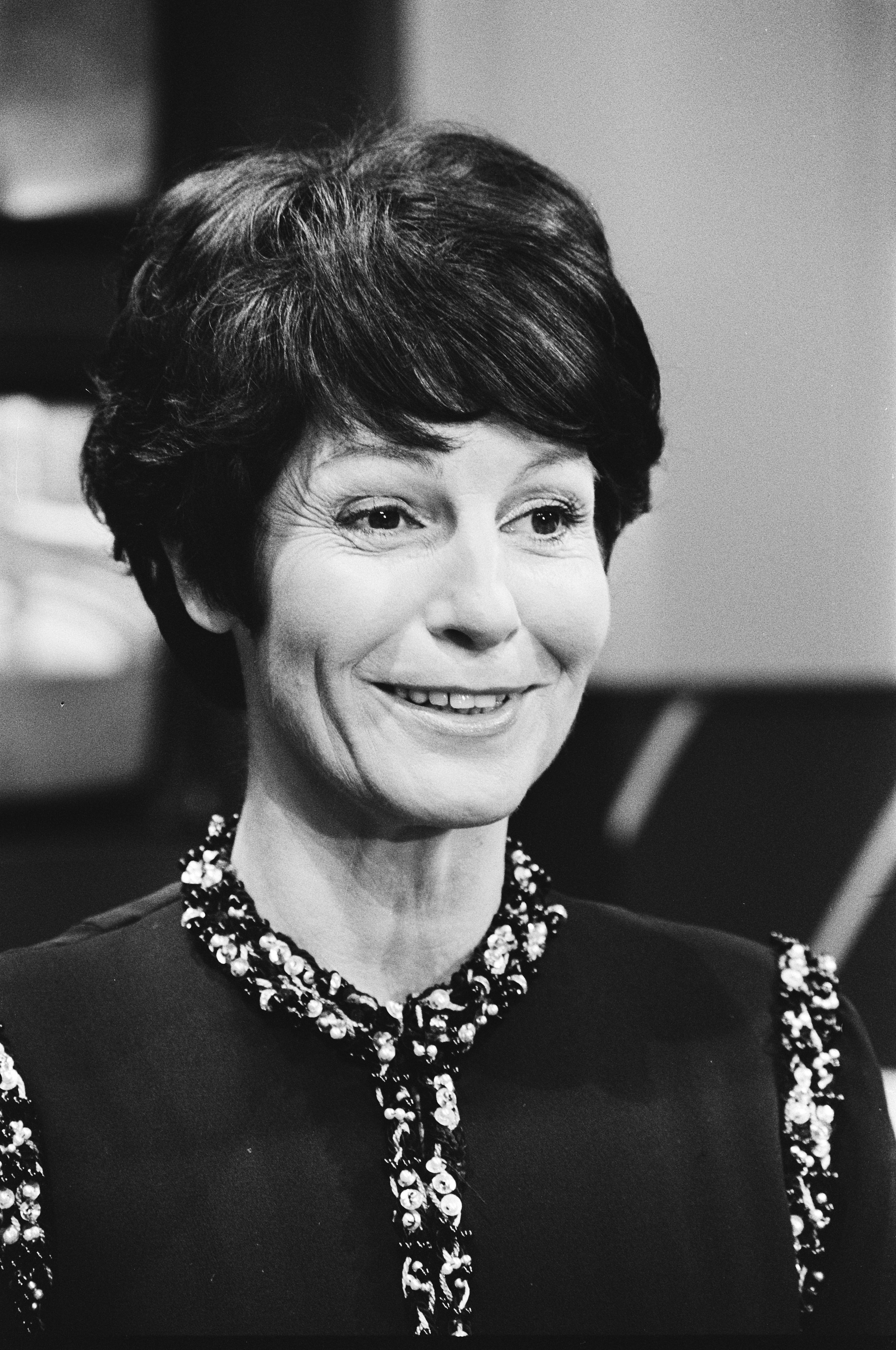
- Mies Bouwman in 1979
- Born: Maria Antoinette Bouwman; 31 December 1929; Amsterdam, Netherlands
- Died: 26 February 2018 (aged 88); Elst, Netherlands
- Occupation: Television presenter
- Known for: Television shows

Maria Antoinette "Mies" Bouwman (31 December 1929 – 26 February 2018) was a Dutch television presenter.

== Career ==
Born in Amsterdam, she started her career on the very first television broadcasting evening of the Dutch broadcasting association KRO (Catholic Radio Broadcaster) on 16 October 1951.

Bouwman made her name as the host of the first large fund-raising programme on Dutch TV, Open Het Dorp. In this show viewers were asked to donate money for charity, in order to open a special village for people with a handicap. This show was broadcast live on 26 and 27 November 1962 and lasted 23 hours. Bouwman presented the entire show. Bouwman developed and hosted Eén van de acht, known in the UK as The Generation Game. She hosted numerous talk shows, as well as the Dutch version of This Is Your Life known as In de hoofdrol.

Mies Bouwman stopped her regular work after falling sick, but has occasionally returned for special programs. She definitively ended her career in 1993 due to health restrictions. Later she appeared on TV for interviews, but never as host, only as a guest.

She was married to Leen Timp, a Dutch TV producer and director. Together they had four children. Bouwman was invested as a Knight of the Order of Orange-Nassau in 1977.

== Death ==
Bouwman died on 26 February 2018 in Elst, Netherlands at the age of 88.

== See also ==
- Netherlands Public Broadcasting
