= Dorf (surname) =

Dorf is a surname. Notable people with the surname include:

- Barbara Dorf (1933–2016), British artist
- Erling Dorf (1905–1984), American geologist and paleobotanist
- Michael Dorf (disambiguation)
- Richard C. Dorf (1933–2020), professor emeritus of Management and Electrical and Computer Engineering at the University of California, Davis
- Shel Dorf (1933–2009), American comic-book letterer
