= John Trapp =

John Trapp may refer to:

- John Trapp (writer) (1601–1669), English writer and theologian
- John Q. Trapp (born 1945), American retired professional basketball player

== See also ==
- John Thrupp (1817–1870), English lawyer and historical writer
