= Michael Dorf =

Michael Dorf may refer to:

- Michael C. Dorf, American law professor

== See also ==
- Michael Dorff, mathematician
- Dorf (disambiguation)
