= Dorf =

Dorf may refer to:

- Dorf (surname)
- Dorf (character), portrayed by Tim Conway
- Dorf, German term for 'village', see Town#Germany
- Dorf, Germany (disambiguation), various settlements
- Dorf, Switzerland, a small town
- DORF (film festival), Croatia

== See also ==
- Dorff
- Dorp (disambiguation)
- Thorp (disambiguation)
