= Thorp =

Middle English word for small village

Thorp is a Middle English word for a hamlet or small village.

== Etymology ==
The name can either come from Old Norse þorp (also thorp), or from Old English (Anglo-Saxon) þrop. There are many place names in England with the suffix "-thorp" or "-thorpe". Those of Old Norse origin are to be found in Northumberland, County Durham, Yorkshire, Lincolnshire, Cambridgeshire, Norfolk, and Suffolk. Those of Anglo-Saxon origin are to be found in southern England from Worcestershire to Surrey. Care must be taken to distinguish the two forms. Variations of the Anglo-Saxon suffix are "-throp", "-thrope", "-trop" and "-trip" (e.g. Adlestrop and Southrope).

Old English (Anglo-Saxon) þrop is cognate with Low-Saxon trup/trop/drup/drop as in Handrup or Waltrop, Frisian terp, German torp or dorf as in Düsseldorf, the 'Village of the river Düssel', and Dutch dorp.

It also appears in Lorraine place-names as -troff such as Grosbliederstroff (France) in front of Kleinblittersdorf (Germany). It sometimes occurs in Normandy as Torp(s) / Tourp(s) / -tourp or even -tour, for instance in: le Torp-Mesnil, le Tourp, Clitourps or Saussetour (Manche, Sauxetorp end 12th century, like Saustrup, Schleswig-Holstein, Germany, former Saxtorppe and Saxtorf, former Saxtorpe 1538 idem, and Saxthorpe in Norfolk, England), all from Old Norse or Old English.

== Use ==
"Thorp" as a word appears in some role-playing games, where it is used to denote the smallest form of permanent collective habitation in the game world. Thorps in Dungeons and Dragons are defined as having between 20–80 inhabitants, while Pathfinder defines them as having 20 or fewer. Hamlets are the next most populous, housing 81–400 or 21–60 people in the respective games.

== See also ==
- Dorf (disambiguation)
- Dorp (disambiguation)
- Thorpe (disambiguation)
- Thrupp (disambiguation)
- Thwaite (placename element), a similarly archaic placename element
