= Thorpe Park (disambiguation) =

Thorpe Park is a theme park to the south of London.

Thorpe Park may also refer to:

- Thorpe Park (The Inbetweeners), an episode of a British sitcom called The Inbetweeners
- Thorpe Park Leeds, a business park in Leeds

== See also ==
- Thorpe Camp, former Royal Air Force barracks for RAF Woodhall Spa
- Thorpe (disambiguation)
