= Open Het Dorp =

1962 Dutch television special

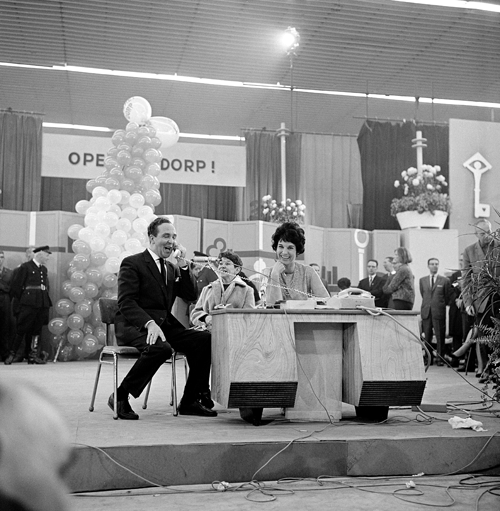
Wim Kan, Corry Vonk and Mies Bouwman during Open Het Dorp

Open het Dorp ("Open the Village") is the first big fundraising television show in the Netherlands. It aired on Dutch television on 26 and 27 November 1962.

Het Dorp is a special village or community for disabled people. To raise the required funds to build and open the community, a TV show was organized.

The program was at that moment the first nationwide fundraising television show, and it was done in the format of a telethon, lasting for twenty-three hours. Mies Bouwman entirely presented it. Most local corner-shops cooperated: viewers could donate by putting cash in a small box (matchbox) and bring it to the local shop: most shops opened their doors on the evening of 26 November; the show was aired on television and radio simultaneously as large numbers of people did not own a television at that time.

The director of the TV show was Theo Orderman. During the show, over 400 artists and other celebrities appeared in the show.

After twenty-three hours of fundraising, a total amount of twenty-one million guilders was collected, which was used to open Het Dorp near the city of Arnhem.

In the archives, only short fragments are available regarding this event.
