= Savior, Like a Shepherd Lead us =

Christian hymm

"Savior, Like a Shepherd Lead Us"
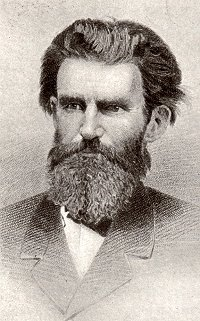
- William Bradbury
- Genre: Hymn
- Written: 1836
- Text: Dorothy Ann Thrupp
- Based on: Isaiah 40:11
- Meter: 8.7.8.7 D
- Melody: "Bradbury" by William B. Bradbury

"Savior, Like a Shepherd Lead us" is a Christian hymn written by Dorothy Ann Thrupp from London. The hymn first appeared unsigned in her collection Hymns for the Young, in 1836. The music is by William B. Bradbury.

== History ==
The composer Dorothy Ann Thrupp was born June 20, 1779, in London, and died in the same city in 1847. She compiled several hymnbooks for children. Savior Like a Shepherd Lead Us appeared unsigned in her Hymns for the Young, published in 1836, but is commonly attributed to her.

There are other histories about this hymn. Ira Sankey sang this hymn in 1875

== Lyrics ==
Savior, like a shepherd lead us,
much we need Thy tender care;
in Thy pleasant pastures feed us,
for our use Thy folds prepare:

|| Blessed Jesus, Blessed Jesus
Thou hast bought us, Thine we are; ||

We are Thine - do Thou befriend us,
be the Guardian of our way;
keep Thy flock, from sin defend us,
seek us when we go astray:

|| Blessed Jesus, Blessed Jesus,
hear, O hear us when we pray; ||

Thou hast promised to receive us,
Poor and sinful though we be;
Thou hast mercy to relieve us,
Grace to cleanse and pow'r to free:

|| Blessed Jesus, Blessed Jesus,
early let us turn to Thee ||

Early let us seek Thy favor,
Early let us do Thy will
Blessed Lord and only Savior,
with Thy love our bosoms fill

|| Blessed Jesus, Blessed Jesus,
Thou hast loved us, love us still ||
