= Frederick Thrupp =

English sculptor (1812–1895)

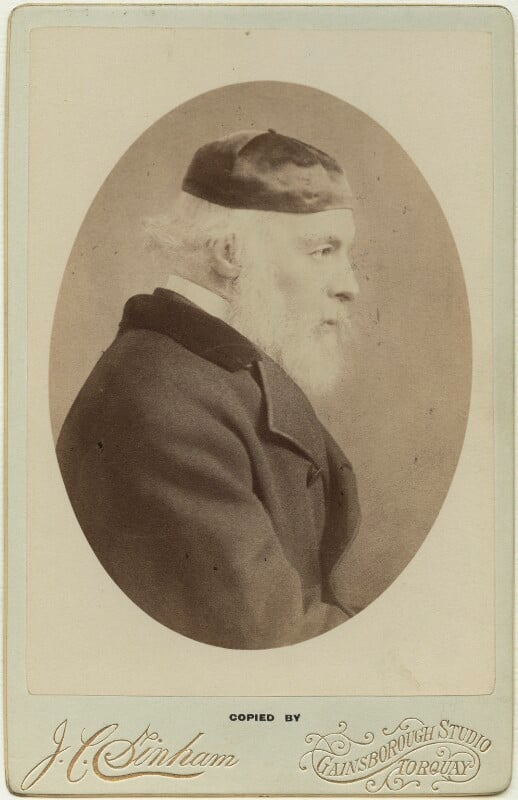
Thrupp, c. 1893

Frederick Thrupp (20 June 1812–21 March 1895) was an English sculptor.

== Life ==
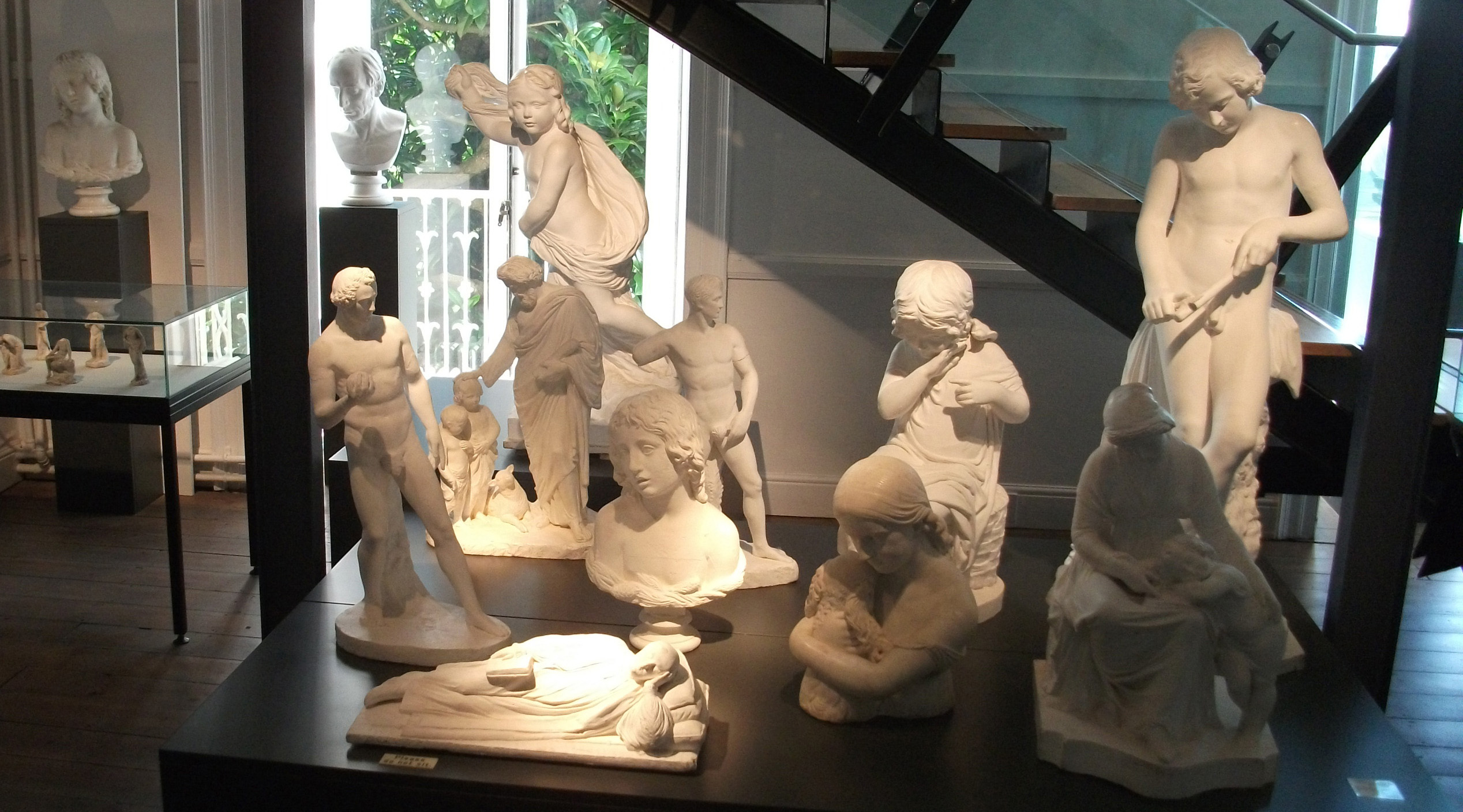
Sculptures by Thrupp at Torre Abbey

Frederick was born on 20 June 1812, the youngest son of Joseph Thrupp of Paddington Green, London, by Mary Pillow (d. 1845), his second wife. Joseph Thrupp from 1774 ran Thrupp & Maberly, a coach factory in George Street, Grosvenor Square. By his first wife, Mary Burgon, Joseph was father of Dorothy Ann Thrupp the hymn-writer, and of John Augustus Thrupp (1785–1814), the father of John Thrupp the historian; also of Charles Joseph Thrupp, the father of Admiral Arthur Thomas Thrupp.

Frederick Thrupp went to the Rev. William Greenlaw's school at Blackheath, where he remained till about 1828. He then joined the academy of Henry Sass in Bloomsbury, where he was a contemporary of John Callcott Horsley, a close friend. In 1829 he won a silver medal from the Society of Arts for a chalk drawing from a bust, and he was admitted to the antique school of the Royal Academy on 15 June 1830.

On 15 February 1837 Thrupp started for Rome, accompanied by James Uwins, nephew of Thomas Uwins, and arrived there on 17 March. While at Rome he had the support of John Gibson, who admired his Ferdinand, modelled soon after his arrival in 1837, and found several private commissions for him. Gibson induced him to abandon a taste for caricature. Thrupp also made the acquaintance of Bertel Thorvaldsen, and formed friendships among the English colony of artists at Rome. He finally returned to London in October 1842, when he took a house at No. 232 Marylebone Road (then called the New Road), where he built a large gallery and studio. He let most of the house and lived at 15 Paddington Green (the house where he was born) till, on his mother's death in 1845, his two unmarried sisters joined him in the Marylebone Road. Here he lived for forty years.

Thrupp spent the winter of 1885–6 in Algiers, the following winter at Sanremo, and he visited the Pyrenees in the spring. In 1887 he left the Marylebone Road and bought a house at Torquay. In 1889 he visited Antwerp, Brussels, and Cologne.

Failing eyesight, followed by paralysis agitans in 1893, compelled Thrupp to abandon active work. He died at Thurlow, Torquay, of influenza and pneumonia, on 21 March 1895, and was buried on 26 March in Torquay cemetery.

== Works ==
Thrupp's first exhibit at the Royal Academy was a piece of sculpture, The Prodigal Returned, 1832. This was followed by a bust of J. H. Pope, 1833, a bust of B. E. Hall, and Mother bending over her Sleeping Infant, 1835, and Contemplation, 1836. The Young Hunter and Mother and Children were exhibited at the Royal Academy in 1837, but he did not exhibit again till 1841. He then sent a small Magdalen in marble, finished in December 1840, after working on his technique for modelling drapery. While in Rome he finished Arethusa, a life-sized recumbent nymph, exhibited in 1843, which went to John Coleridge, 1st Baron Coleridge; Hebe with the Eagle, and Boys with a Basket of Fruit, both exhibited in 1844, and several other works in marble.

Thrupp's major public commissions were: the statue of Sir Thomas Fowell Buxton, 1846, exhibited at the Royal Academy in 1848, and placed near the monument to William Wilberforce in the north transept of Westminster Abbey; two statues for the House of Lords, 1847; "Timon of Athens" for the Mansion House, 1853; and the statue of William Wordsworth for the baptistery of Westminster Abbey. At the Great Exhibition 1851 he gained two medals for The Maid and Mischievous Boy, a life-sized plaster group, first exhibited in 1847; and The Boy and the Butterfly in marble, exhibited in 1850, and sold in 1885 to a private owner at York. He continued to exhibit statues, bas-reliefs, or busts at the Royal Academy almost every year till 1880.

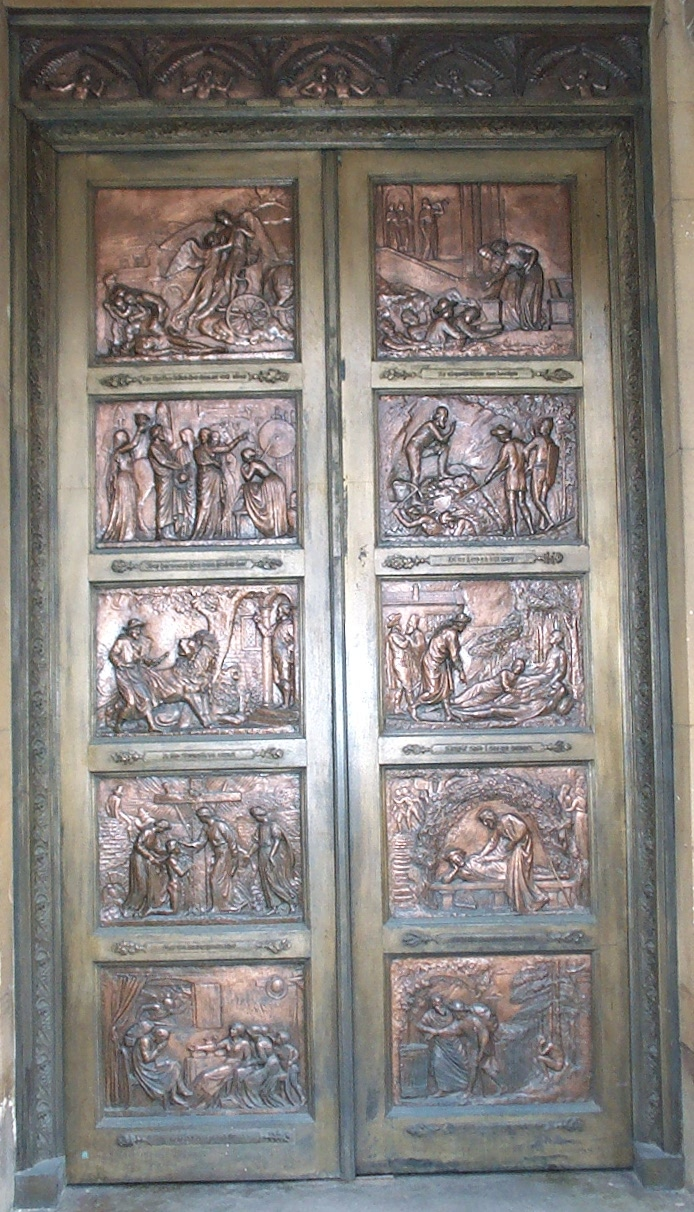
Bunyan Chapel Door by Frederick Thrupp

The subjects Thrupp chose were often religious. He modelled subjects from John Bunyan's Pilgrim's Progress, as well as a series of ten bas-reliefs. He exhibited in 1860 a statue of Bunyan, and in 1868 a pair of bronze doors with ten subjects from the book, which were purchased by the Duke of Bedford and presented to the Bunyan Chapel, Bedford. The plaster models for these doors were presented by the sculptor to the Baptist College, Regent's Park, in 1880. Another pair of doors, with bronze panels illustrating George Herbert's poems, were exhibited with other works by Thrupp, including sixty terra-cotta statuettes, a marble bust of Wordsworth, and some bas-reliefs, at the Fitzwilliam Museum, and then accepted by Brooke Foss Westcott as a gift to the divinity school at Cambridge.

Thrupp executed the monument to Lady Coleridge at Ottery St. Mary in Devon; the reredos representing the Last Supper in St. Clement's, York; and the monument to Hugh Nicholas Pearson in Sonning Church, Berkshire, in 1883. His last work was a plaster bust of E. Vivian, which he presented to the Torquay School of Art in 1888.

In addition to his work as a sculptor, Thrupp designed and engraved in outline illustrations to Paradise Lost. He also illustrated with lithographs the works The Ancient Mariner and The Prisoner of Chillon; and drew a series of views of Ilfracombe on the stone. He rarely painted in colour, most of his work is in monochrome.

== Legacy ==
Thrupp spent time in 1892–4 on negotiations for the ultimate disposal of his works. There were a large number in marble and plaster, with about 150 small studies in terra-cotta, and numerous drawings, which remained on his hands. By the intervention of the dowager countess of Northesk, it was ultimately arranged with the mayor and corporation of Winchester that his works should find a home there. In 1894 he sent on loan, as a first instalment, four marble statues—Eve, The Prodigal Son, Hebe, and Boys with Fruit—and twenty works in plaster. The Thrupp gallery, in the ancient abbey buildings in the public garden adjoining the Guildhall, was inaugurated on 8 November 1894. Thrupp bequeathed all his property, including his remaining works, to his wife, but in accordance with his wishes they were to be presented to the city of Winchester. In 1911, however, the city of Winchester returned the gift. The works came back to Torquayand found a permanent home, at Torre Abbey there, in 1930–2.

== Family ==
Late in life, on 11 July 1885, Thrupp married Sarah Harriet Ann Frances, eldest daughter of John Thurgar of Norwich and Algiers, who survived him. Joseph Francis Thrupp was his nephew.
