= Barbara Dorf =

British artist

- Born: 1933; London, England
- Died: 2016 (aged 82–83)
- Education: Central School of Art and Crafts; Slade School of Fine Art
- Known for: Painting

Barbara Dorf (1933–2016) was a British artist known for her paintings of architectural subjects.

== Biography ==
Dorf was born and grew up in London and studied at the Central School of Art and Crafts in London and then at the Slade School of Fine Art until 1962. She painted architectural subjects in oil and watercolour and in charcoal drawings. During her career she taught at the Ruskin School of Drawing and at Oxford Brookes University. She was a regular exhibitor at the Royal Academy in London and with the New English Art Club. Starting in 1978, Dorf had a series of solo shows at the Michael Parkin Gallery and also had solo shows at the Montpelier Sandelson Gallery in 1981 and a number of shows at the Mass Gallery from 1986. In 1993 she was part of a three artist show at the Jerram Gallery in Salisbury. Works by Dorf are in the British Museum collection and also held by both Lady Margaret Hall and St Edmund Hall in Oxford. Kingston University holds an archive of Dorf's long-term correspondence with her friend, the author Iris Murdoch.
