= Dorf, Germany =

Dorf in German translates to "village", and -dorf is a common suffix in place names in Germany, Austria, and Switzerland.

Dorf, Germany may refer to:

- Dorf (Bayrischzell), part of the municipality of Bayrischzell, Miesbach, Bayern
- Dorf (Bernau im Schwarzwald), part of the municipality of Bernau im Schwarzwald, Waldshut, Baden-Württemberg
- Dorf (Biederbach), part of the municipality of Biederbach, Emmendingen, Baden-Württemberg
- Dorf (Engelsberg), part of the municipality of Engelsberg, Traunstein, Bayern
- Dorf (Ering), part of the municipality of Ering, Rottal-Inn, Bayern
- Dorf (Fürstenzell), part of the town of Fürstenzell, Passau, Bayern
- Dorf (Künzing), part of the municipality of Künzing, Deggendorf, Bayern
- Dorf (Oberstdorf), part of the town of Oberstdorf, Oberallgäu, Bayern
- Dorf (Pfronten), part of the municipality of Pfronten, Ostallgäu, Bayern
- Dorf (Schmelz), part of the municipality of Schmelz, Saarlouis, Saarland
- Dorf (Seeon-Seebruck), part of the municipality of Seeon-Seebruck, Traunstein, Bayern
- Dorf (Vilshofen), part of the municipality of Vilshofen, Passau, Bayern
- Dorf (Wittlich), part of the town of Wittlich, Bernkastel-Wittlich, Rheinland-Pfalz
