= Thorp Ridges =

Bluff in Antarctica

Highest point
- Coordinates: 66°34′S 52°51′E

Geography
- Location: Enderby Land, East Antarctica

Geology
- Mountain type: Ridge

Thorp Ridges are three almost parallel ridges standing 18 nmi (33 km; 21 mi) west of Stor Hanakken Mountain in Enderby Land. Plotted from air photos taken from ANARE (Australian National Antarctic Research Expeditions) aircraft in 1956. Named by Antarctic Names Committee of Australia (ANCA) for A. Thorp, electrical fitter at Wilkes Station in 1961.
