= Thrupp & Maberly =

British coachbuilding company

Thrupp & Maberly was a British coachbuilder based in the West End of London, England. Coach-maker to Queen Victoria, it operated for more than two centuries until closed under Rootes Group ownership in 1967.

== History ==
=== Thrupp ===
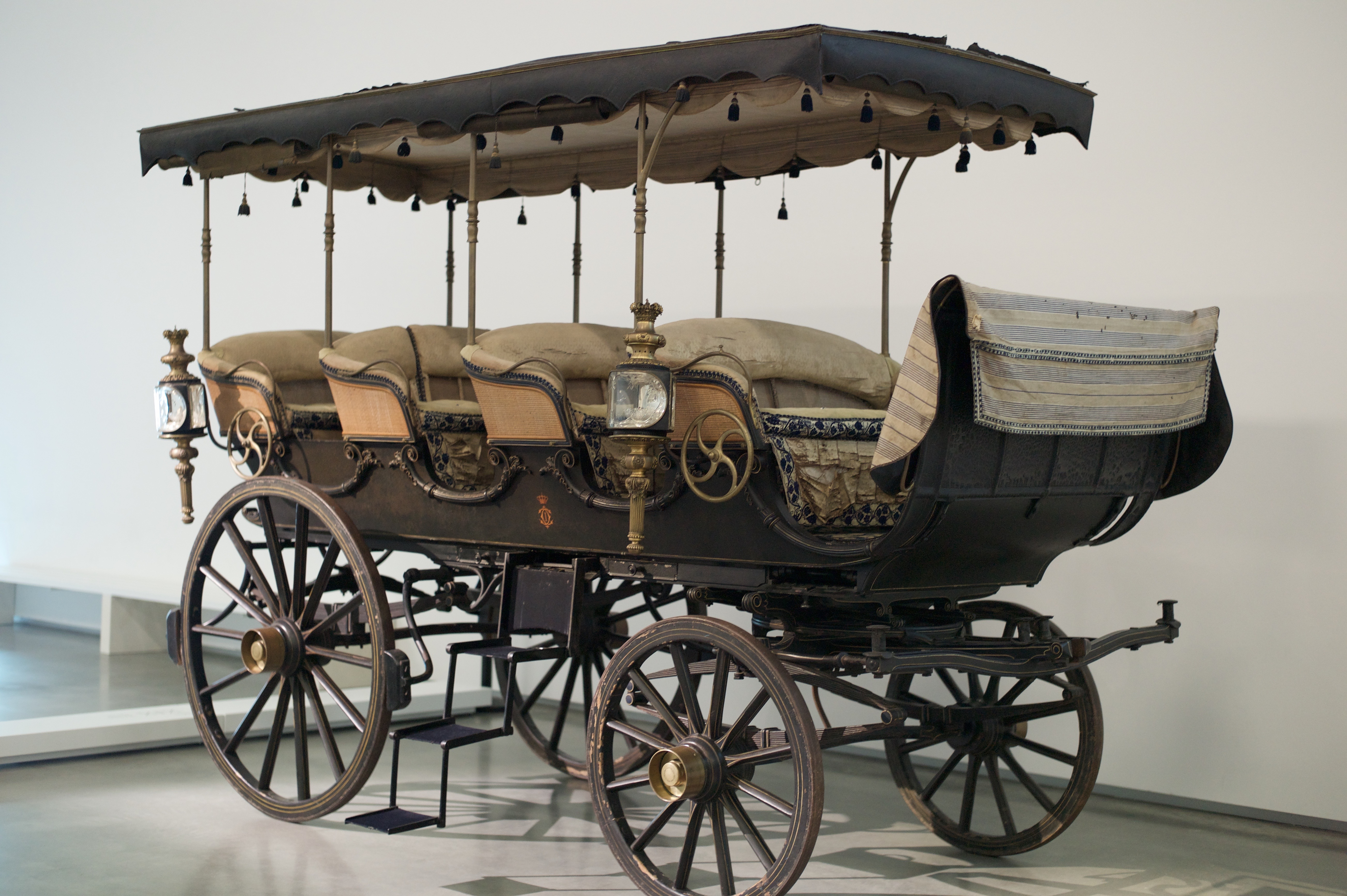
A Thrupp & co. charabanc, built for Queen Maria II of Portugal

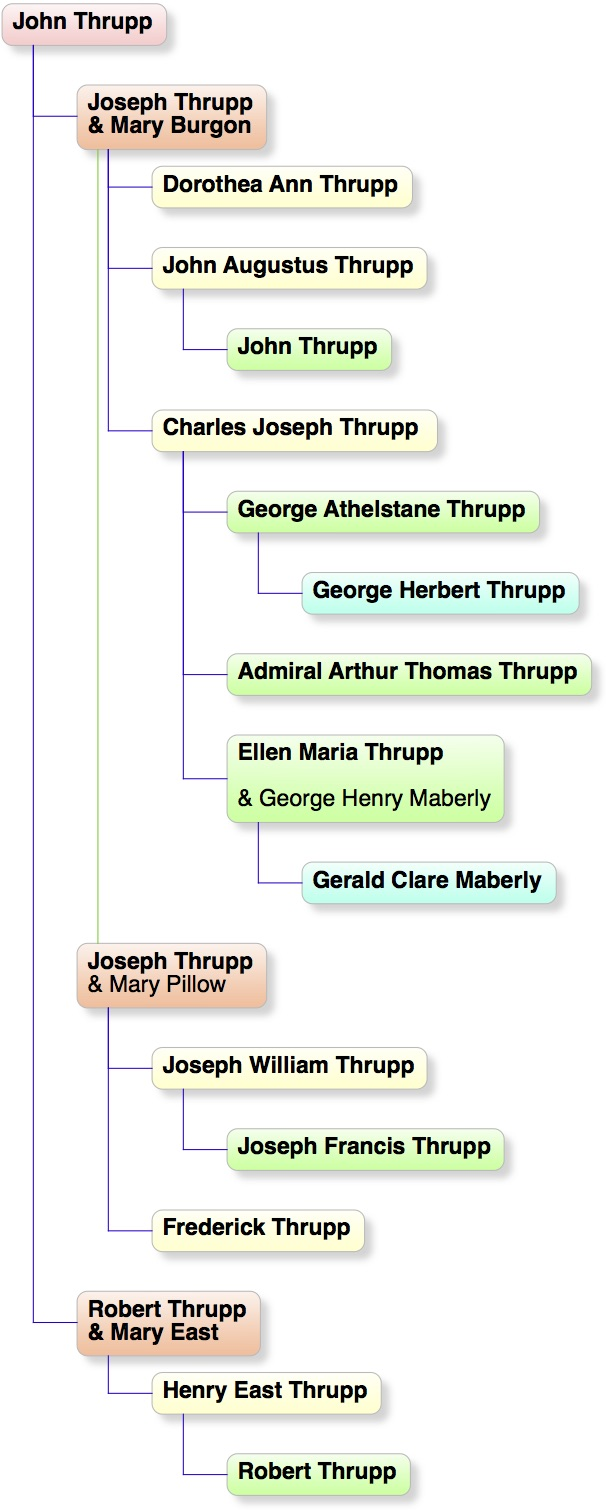
This family coachbuilding firm was started near Worcester about 1740. The founder's son, Joseph Thrupp (died London 1821), came to London about 1765 and ran a coach making business in George Street, Grosvenor Square. (Note: Though his best known coachbuilder descendant was George Athelstane Thrupp (1822-1905) Joseph left a number of notable descendants , churchman and academic who were not coach, carriage or harness makers: Arthur Thomas Thrupp (1828-1889), Royal Navy officer; Dorothea Ann Thrupp (1777-1847), writer; Frederick Thrupp (1812-1895), sculptor; John Thrupp (1817-1870), historian; Joseph Francis Thrupp (1827–1867); Notable family members)

There was access to the workshops through an arch in Oxford Street, and in the early 19th century this was developed into a showroom.

Joseph's London business was continued by his nephew Henry East Thrupp (1774-1852), (Note: Thrupp, Henry East, son of Robert, St James. Apprenticed smith to Henry East, 8 January 1789 - Blacksmith's Company apprenticeship abstracts (possibly his grandfather)) father of coach builder Robert (1813-1871), together with Joseph's much younger fourth son Charles Joseph Thrupp (1791-1872), (Note: ODNB shows an incorrect death date) who left his nine surviving children £30,000. Those nine children included George Athelstane Thrupp (1822-1905), who later carried on the business.

=== Maberly ===
At the beginning of 1858 coachbuilder George Maberly (1797-1883) merged his 70 Welbeck Street business with Thrupps, moving to Oxford Street and becoming their partner. The firm's name was immediately changed to Thrupp & Maberly. In 1863 they advertised they were Coach Builders & Harness-Makers by Appointment to the Queen. Later his son George Henry Maberly (1836-1901) was taken into George Athelstane Thrupp's partnership.

=== George Athelstane Thrupp ===
George Athelstane Thrupp (1822–1905) (Note: Son of Charles Joseph Thrupp (1791-1872)) became company head and a leader of his craft known internationally within it. He was a founder of the Coach-makers' Benevolent Institution and helped form the Institute of British Carriage Manufacturers and the technical schools for coach artisans which were taken over by the Regent Street Polytechnic. He served as Master of the Coachmakers' and Coach Harness Makers' Company in 1883

Thrupp's publications included:

- The History of Coaches published in 1877, originally a series of lectures delivered in 1876 to the Society for the Encouragement of Arts, Manufactures and Commerce;
- Coach Trimming with William Farr in 1888;
- Hand Book for Coach Painters, William Simpson, 1888 (as editor)

G A Thrupp's sister, Ellen (1829-1914) married business partner George Henry Maberly (1836-1901) in 1869.

G A Thrupp’s son George Herbert Thrupp (1859–1925) joined Thrupp & Maberly.

== Motor vehicles ==
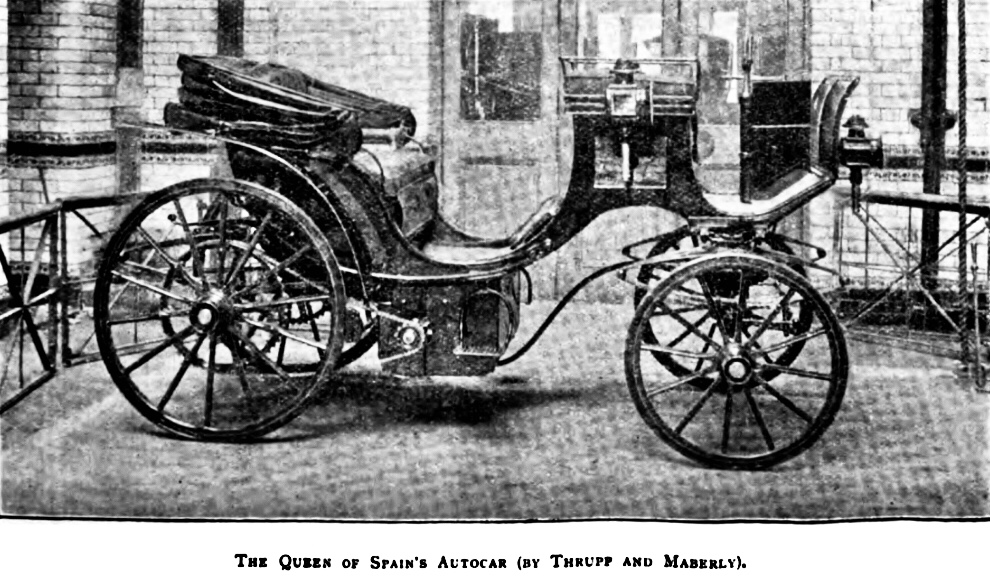
Thrupp & Maberly (1896) electric car for the Queen of Spain

As far back as the 1880s Thrupp & Maberly began its move from making horse-drawn carriages to making car bodies watching developments in electric cars, fitting Immisch motors in carriages to order and in 1896 supplying an electric car to the Queen of Spain. By the spring of 1897 Thrupp & Maberley held the British licence for the Duryea Motor Wagon. More commissions followed and the business grew leading to large numbers of bodies being made for staff cars during World War I.

After the 1914-1918 war Thrupp & Maberly produced a range of bespoke bodies for up-market British and European marques. In 1924, the works were moved to new premises at 108 Cricklewood Lane, Cricklewood, London, with a showroom at 20 North Audley Street in the West End of London, which in 1925 was bought by the remarkable salesmen the Rootes brothers. The Rootes brothers interests were then in distribution and repair and not manufacture. Thrupp & Maberly remained a prestige coachbuilder, concentrating on luxury bodies for Rolls-Royce, Daimler and Bentley automobiles. In 1929, they built the body for Sir Henry Segrave's land speed record car, the Golden Arrow. The Rootes brothers bought Humber, and with it Hillman in 1928, and from 1932 bodies were made for the top of the range Humbers. Additional premises were obtained in 1936 in the old Darracq works in Warple Way, Acton, London, adjacent to a company called British Light Steel Pressings, with whom they merged in 1939. During the Second World War they again built staff cars on Humber chassis.

When peacetime production resumed after the end of the Second World War the Acton works was disposed of, and as the market for luxury coach-built vehicles was in decline, they concentrated on special bodies for Rootes Group vehicles, including making all the catalogued open-top Humbers. By the mid-1960s, this work was also in decline, and the Cricklewood factory closed in 1967 when employee numbers had fallen to 1,000.

At the time of its sale in January 1968 the Cricklewood factory on Edgware Road by the North Circular Road contained 120,000 square feet on a site of six acres.

== Gallery ==
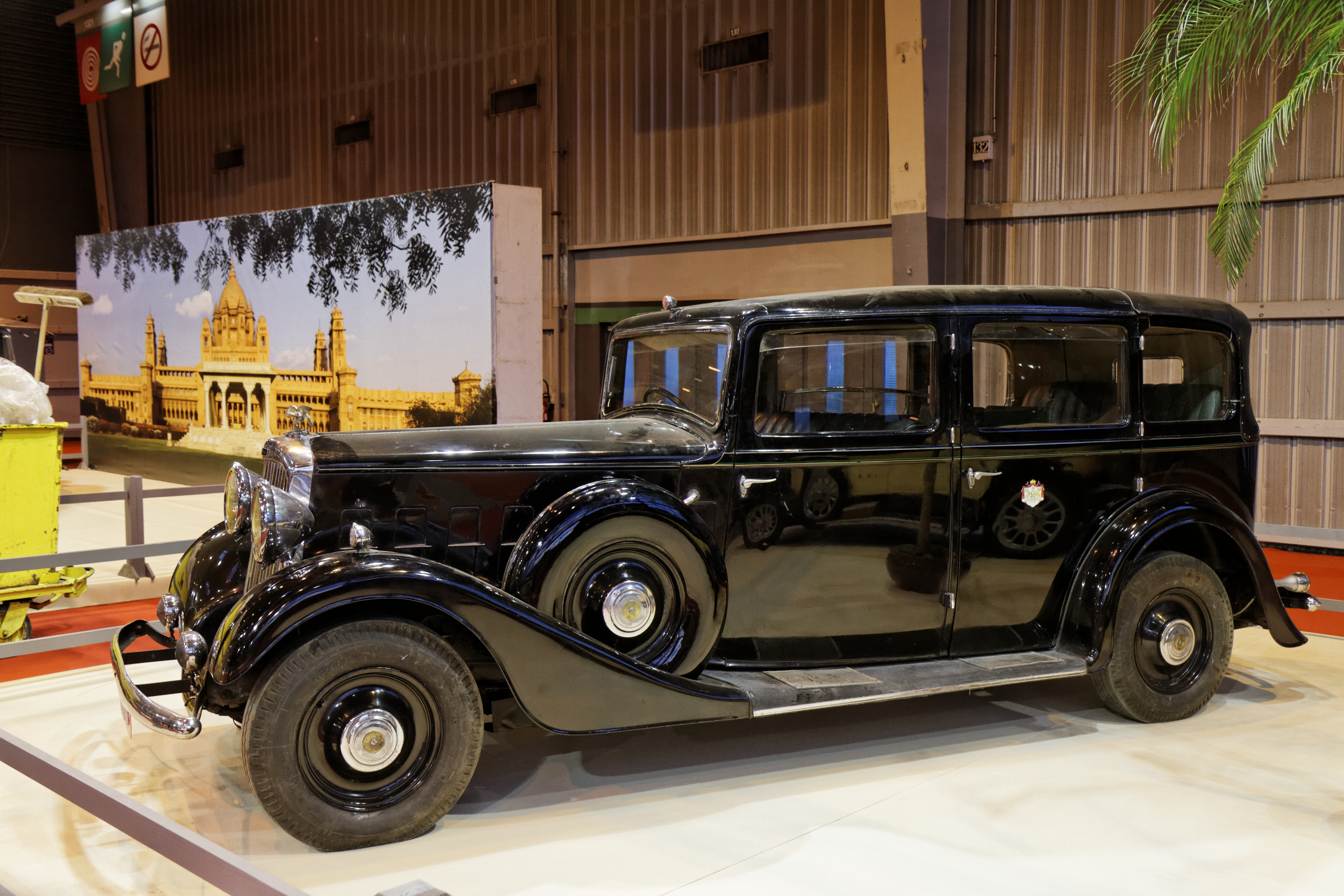
Landaulette on a Humber Snipe 80 chassis 1934

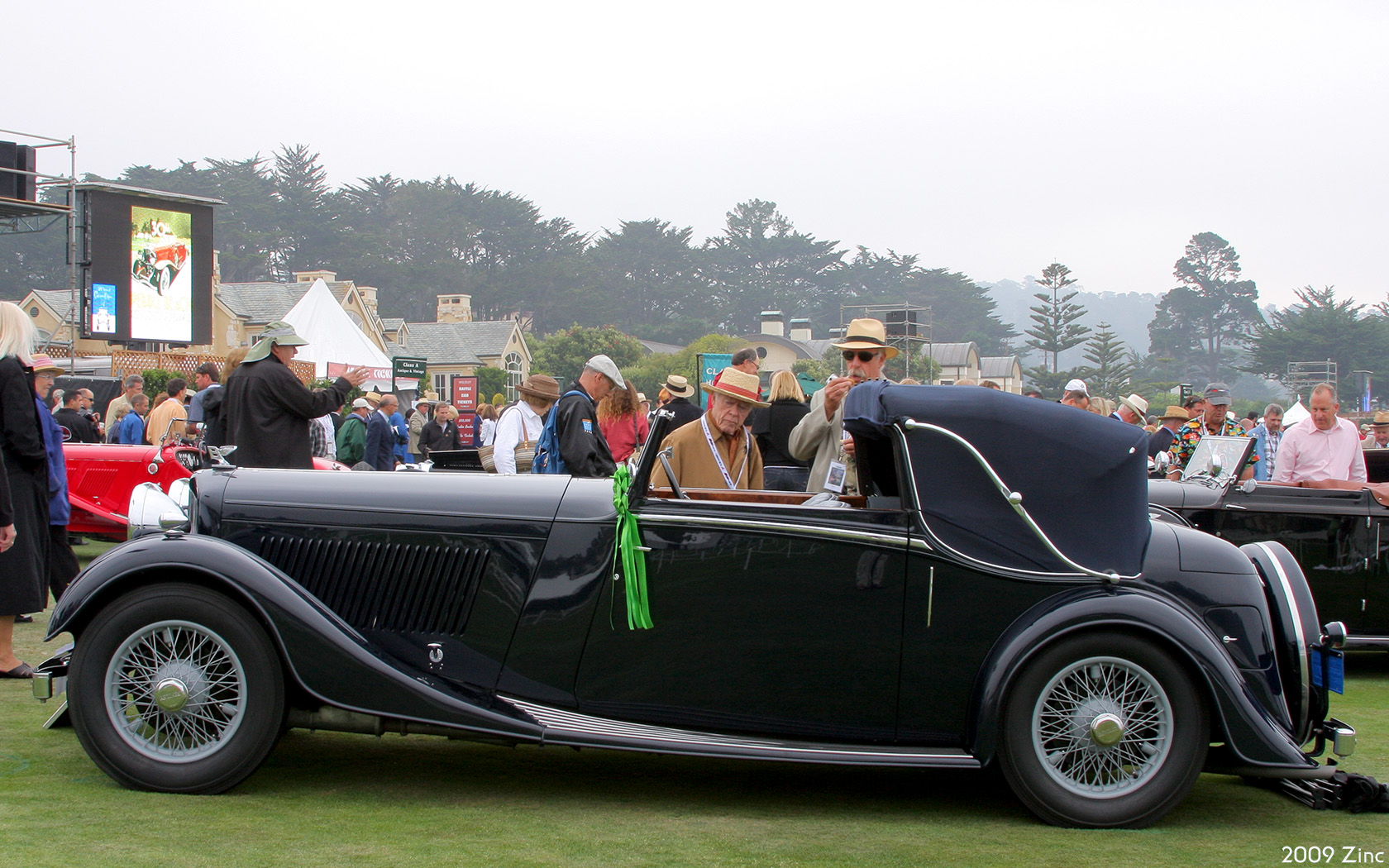
Drophead coupé on a Derby Bentley chassis 1934

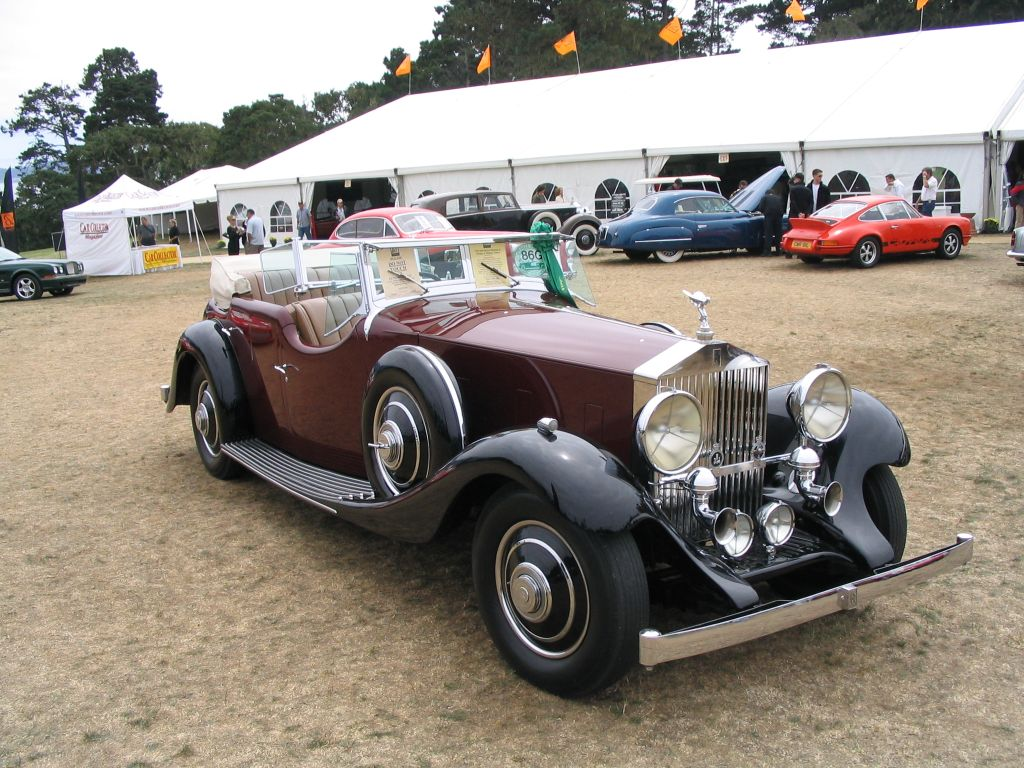
2-door toureron a Rolls-Royce chassis 1935

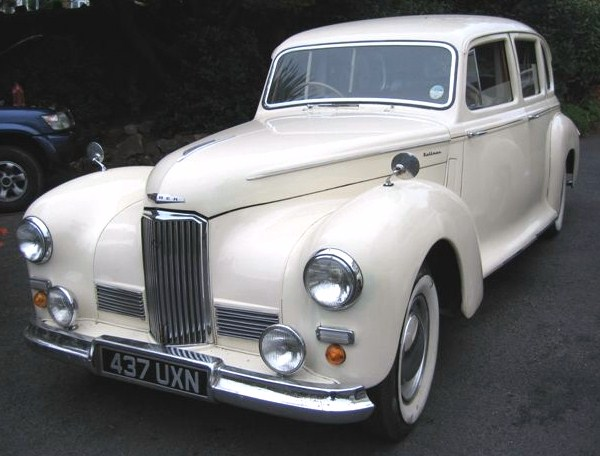
Pullman limousine on a Humber chassis 1949

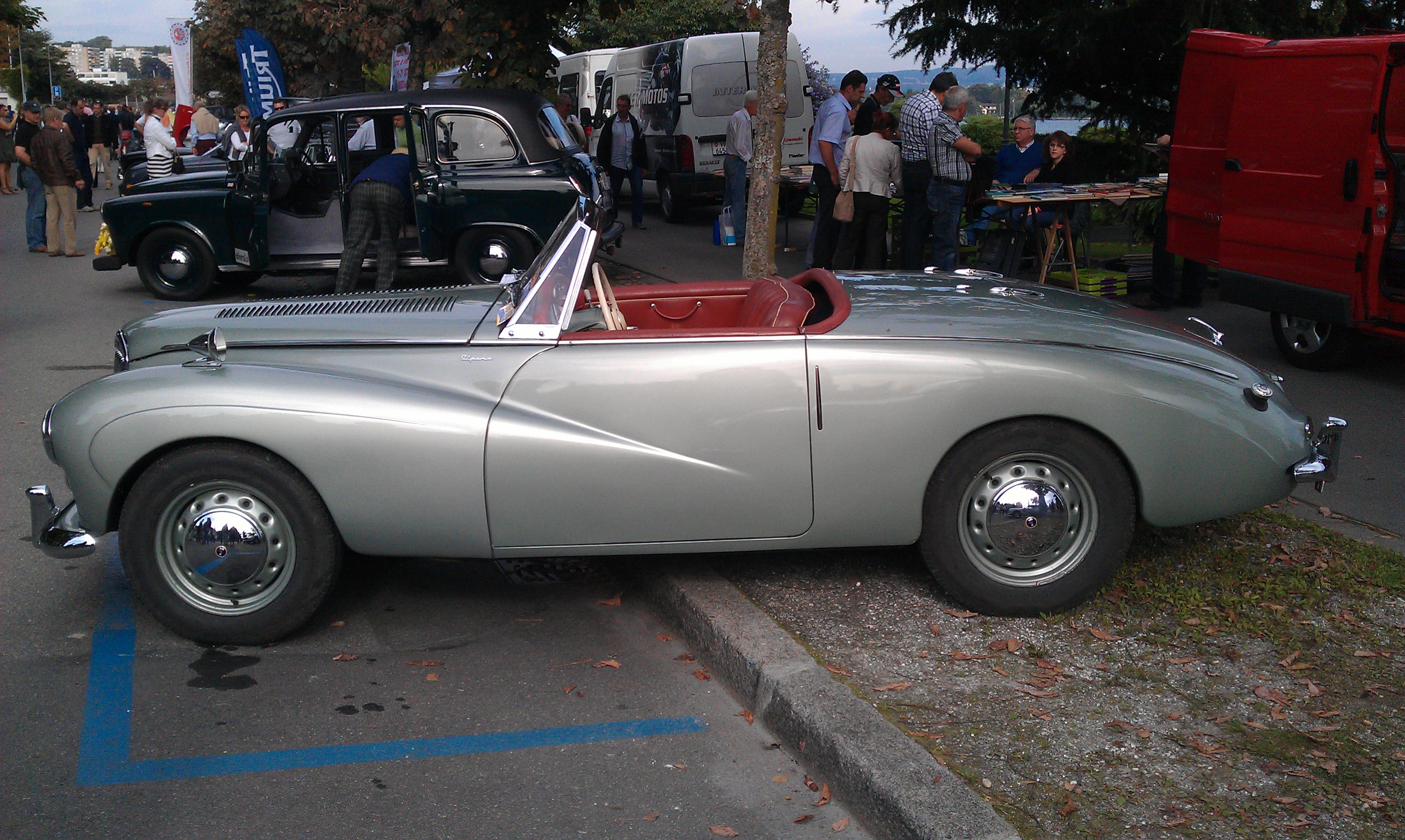
Open two-seater 1953 Sunbeam Alpine

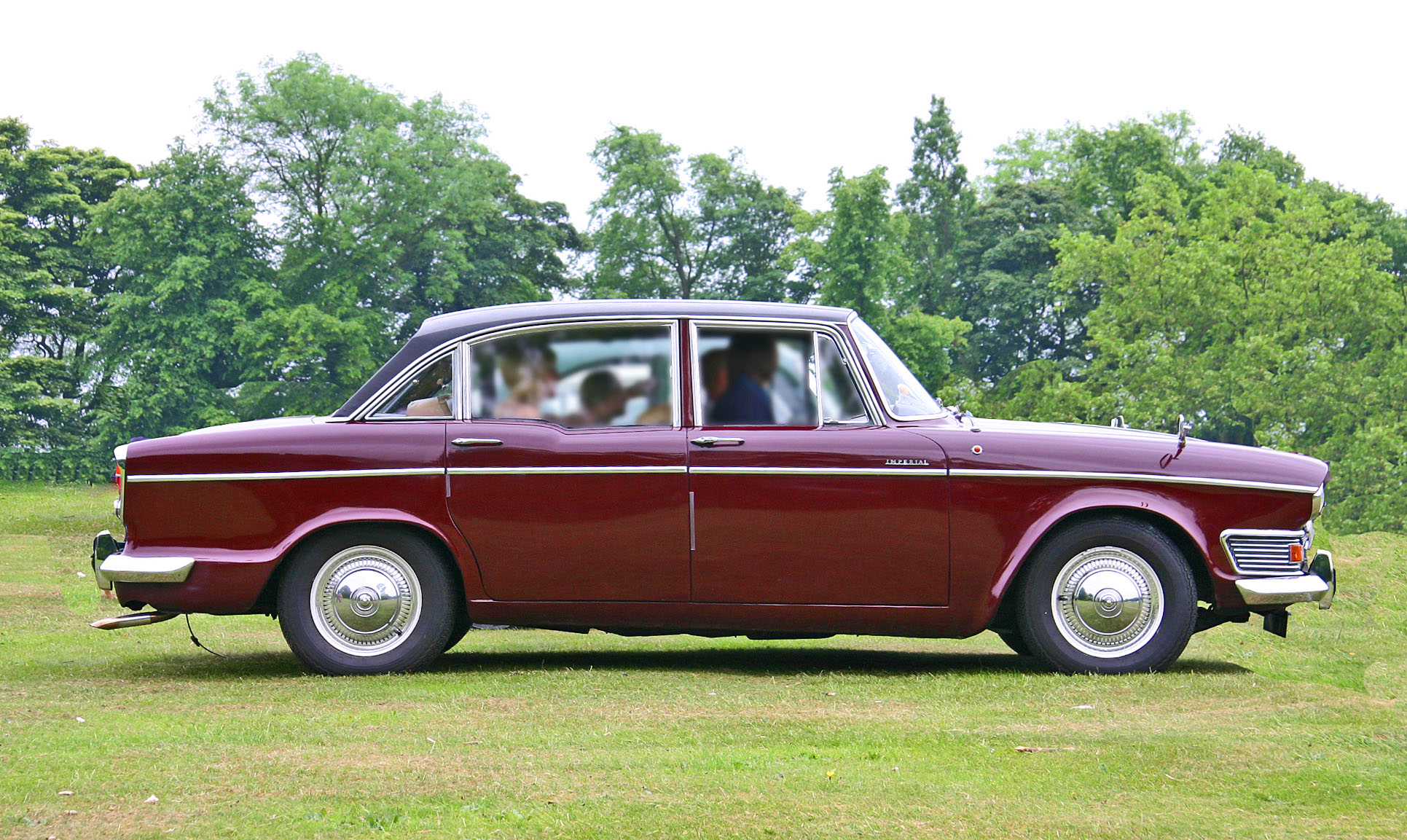
Humber Imperial 1964 a Humber Super Snipe with luxury finishes

== Locations ==
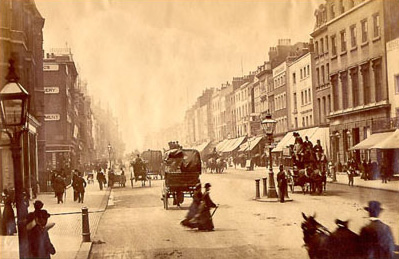
Thrupp & Maberley at the very left of this picture, Oxford Street 1875

For many years this business operated from 269 (renumbered 425) Oxford Street, London, with access from the side street, George Street (now Balderton Street). In 1914 their premises which had included their workshops were purchased by the store on the opposite side of Oxford Street, Selfridge & Co, to open Selfridge's household department though war seems to have disrupted Selfridge's plans and Thrupp & Maberly's showroom remained at that address until 1916. That year they moved the showroom along to 475 Oxford Street then moved again in late 1921 to 20 North Audley Street, all in the same locality. When the Rootes brothers took control Thrupp & Maberly was moved a mile further south and set up in Rootes' new premises in the new Devonshire House, Piccadilly, opening there 22 September 1926. There again they advertised they were by appointment to H.M. the King official retailers of Rolls-Royce cars and special coach builders to the Daimler Company. In 1928 ownership passed to Humber Limited, a new member of the Rootes Group.

West End addresses

1. 33 George Street (now Balderton Street), Grosvenor Square, .

a.k.a. 269 Oxford Street
a.k.a. 425 Oxford Street following re-numbering of Oxford Street

Both showrooms and workshops were on the corner of Oxford and George (Lumley) Streets until 1916 (following its sale to Selfridges in 1914)
The multi-storey premises included their workshops which were accessed from George Street. The workshops were demolished in 1937.

2. 475 Oxford Street until 1922

3. 20 North Audley Street until 1926

4. Devonshire House, Piccadilly (Rootes Group)

Thrupp & Sons were listed separately in 1842 as coach spring and patent axle tree manufacturers at 5, 6, 11 & 12 George Street (now Lumley Street) Grosvenor Square and Thrupp & Sons, tyre smiths, George Street Grosvenor Square.
