= Dorp =

Dorp means "village" in Dutch and Afrikaans. It may refer to:

== Places ==
- Dorp, Netherlands, a neighbourhood or other area within the city of Zoetermeer
- Het Dorp, literally "the village", a neighbourhood or other area near Arnhem, Netherlands
- New Dorp, a district of Staten Island, New York, United States
- Oude Dorp, the old name for what is now Old Town, Staten Island
- Reeuwijk-Dorp, near Gouda, Netherlands
- Ons Dorp, a neighbourhood of Menen, Belgium

== Other uses ==
- Dorp (band), a South African musical group based in London

== See also ==
- Dorf (disambiguation)
- Thorp (disambiguation)
