= Thorpe, Missouri =

Unincorporated community in Missouri

Coordinates: 37°29′16″N 92°59′52″W

Thorpe is an unincorporated community in Dallas County, in the U.S. state of Missouri. The community lies just north of the Dallas-Webster county line, with Missouri Route W and the Niangua River passing about one mile to the east. The community lies approximately midway between Buffalo, eleven miles to the northwest and Marshfield, eleven miles to the southeast.

== History ==
A post office called Thorpe was established in 1880, and remained in operation until 1907. The community has the name of J. G. T. Thorpe, a pioneer citizen.
