= Het Dorp =

Village in Gelderland, Netherlands

Coordinates: 51°59′25″N 5°52′44″E

Het Dorp is a neighborhood or village in the Netherlands near Arnhem. The phrase "het dorp" literally means "the village".

Open Het Dorp was a TV telethon in November 1962, which raised funds to construct the village for independent living for people with disabilities.
