= Jimmy Thorpe (footballer, born 1879) =

English footballer

Jimmy Thorp
Personal information
- Full name: James Thorp
- Date of birth: 22 June 1879
- Place of birth: Bury, England
- Date of death: 1956 (aged 76–77)
- Position: Wing half

Senior career*
| Years | Team | Apps | (Gls) |
| 1902–1903 | Black Lane Temperance | | |
| 1903–1906 | Ramsbottom | | |
| 1906–1907 | Bolton Wanderers | 2 | (0) |
| 1907–1908 | Leeds City | 9 | (0) |
| 1908–1909 | Crystal Palace | | |
| 1909 | Darwen | | |
| 1909 | Rochdale | | |
| Total | | 11 | (0) |
- * Club domestic league appearances and goals

James Thorp (22 June 1879 – 1956) was an English footballer who played in the Football League for Bolton Wanderers and Leeds City.
