= DORF (film festival) =

- Location: Vinkovci, Croatia
- Founded: 2007
- Language: International
- Website: www.filmfestivaldorf.com

DORF is a film festival featuring music documentary films. The festival was started in 2007 and was organized by Association of movie fans "RARE" in Vinkovci. The festival is held annually - usually in the first half of March. Movies of all formats are selected in three categories—regional, international and out of competition (Secret history of Rock). DORF largely concentrates on covering regional documentary production, and after several years of activity, it opened to international works, and became a member of the Association of music film festivals and Music Film Festival Network. Last festival edition was held in 2024. Finally, DORF monography was published in 2024.

DORF was hosted several years simultaneously in Vinkovci and Rijeka/Cres/Ozalj/Primošten/Pula, in a variety of venues. Previous guests of the festival include Don Letts, who attended in 2008 and presented his movie on The Clash, Donald McGlynn, Vincent Moon, David Kleijwegt, Peter Braatz... In addition to screenings, its OFF DORF programme comprises photography and painting art exhibitions, workshops, concerts, book promotions and round tables.

Each year after the festival, DORF goes touring to other countries and cities in this region—in 18 years, highlights of the festival were presented in 84 cities throughout Croatia, Serbia, Slovenia, Macedonia and Bosnia and Herzegovina. In 2013 DORF was presented in Vienna, Austria.

From 2010. - 2023. editions of the festival included 2 awards - 1 for "lifetime achievement" and 1 for "underground contribution".

DORF awards
Year	Title	Author(s)	Country
2007	Dolgcajt	Igor Zupe	Slovenia
2008	Sevdah O Rodama	Silvio Mirosnicenko	Croatia
2009	Kike Turmix	Roger Sommerseth	Norway
2010	Prvi Pravi Ženski Zvuk	Brankica Draskovic	Serbia
2011	We Don't Care About Music Anyway	Cedric Dupire / G. Kuentz	France
2011	Ako Nikoj Ne Sviri	Gjorgji Janevski	Macedonia
2012	V Letu Hip Hopa	Boris Petkovič	Slovenia
2013	Kako Smo Ušli U Europu - Slučaj SexA	Ines Pletikos	Croatia
2014	Pravi Človek Za Kapitalizem	Dušan Moravec	Slovenia
2015	Izgubljeno Dugme	R. Bubalo / R. Tonković / M. Vukadin	Croatia
2016	Ne grem na koleno	D.Moravec / M.Šalehar	Slovenia
2017	LP film Buldožer - Pljuni istini u oči	Varja Močnik	Slovenia
2018	Glasnije od oružja	Miroslav Sikavica	Croatia
2019	Putnici	Tina Šimurina	Croatia
2020	Tusta	Andrej Korovljev	Croatia
2021	Indexi	Z. Kubura / B. Hadžiabdić	BiH
2022	Bite of paradise	Magda Mas	Croatia
2023	Uspon i pad SFT-a	Rela Petric	Croatia
2024	Sanjalice	Vladimir Petrović	Serbia

DORF special awards
Year	Winner	Category	Country	Winner	Category	Country
2010	Peter Braatz	Lifetime achievement	Germany			
2012	VIS Uragani	Lifetime achievement	Croatia	Velid Đekić	Underground	Croatia
2014				Marko Brecelj		Slovenia
2015	Zdenko Franjić	Lifetime achievement	Croatia			
2016	Don Letts	Lifetime achievement	UK			
2017	Dubravko Mataković	Lifetime achievement	Croatia	Damir Bartol Indoš	Underground	Croatia
2018	Vojo Šindolić	Lifetime achievement	Croatia	Šareni dućan i Krunoslav Jajetić	Underground	Croatia
2019	Slobodan Šijan	Lifetime achievement	Serbia	Rambo Amadeus	Underground	Serbia
2020	Želimir Babogredac	Lifetime achievement	Croatia	Igor Hofbauer	Underground	Croatia
2021	Radislav Jovanov	Lifetime achievement	Croatia	Mate Škugor	Underground	Croatia
2022	Stjepan Jimmy Stanić	Lifetime achievement	Croatia	Damir Avdić	Underground	BiH
2023	Saša Anočić	Lifetime achievement	Croatia	Mario Kovač	Underground	Croatia
