= Elst, Utrecht =

Elst
- Village
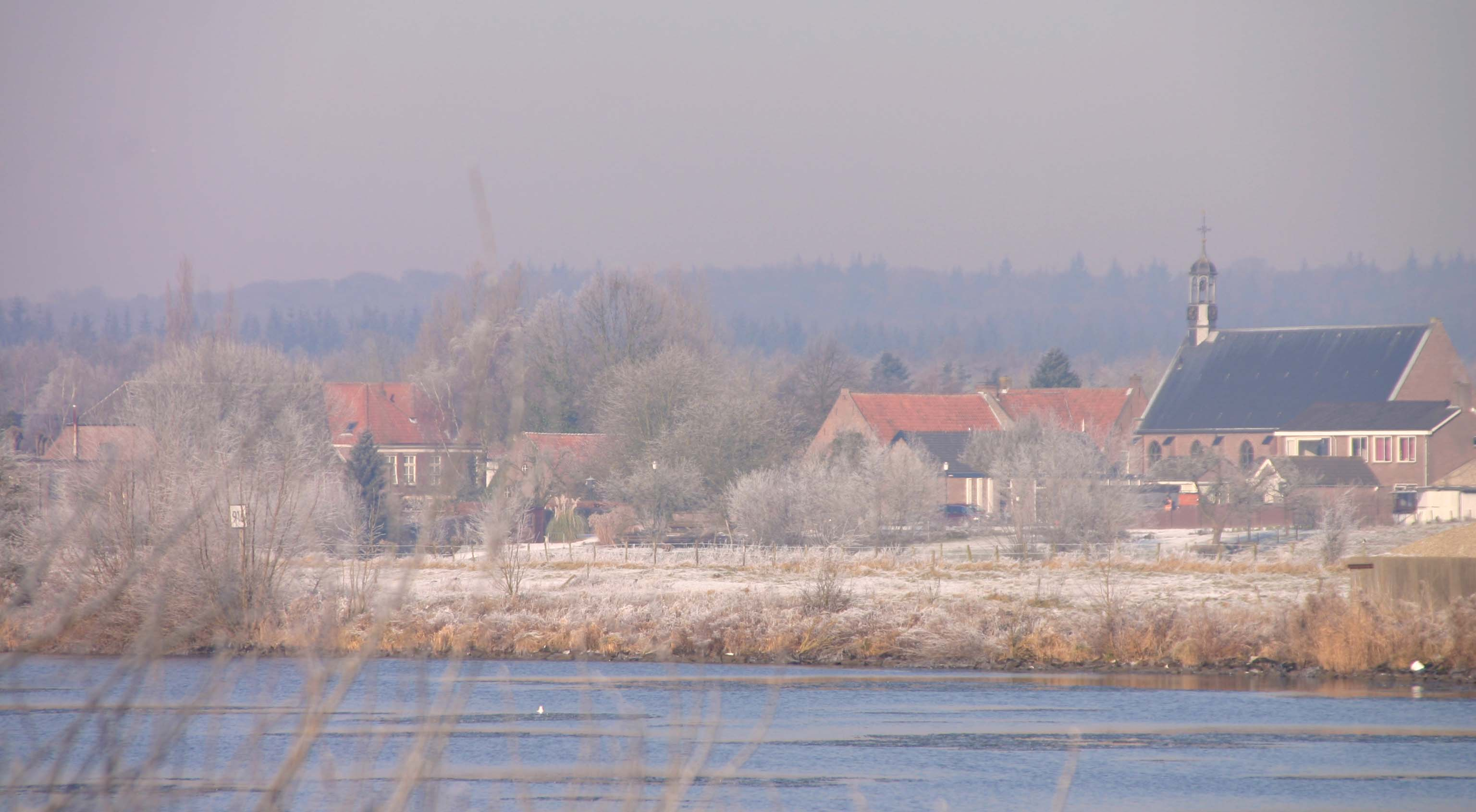
- View of Elst from the other side of the Lower Rhine.

- Location in the Netherlands Elst (Netherlands)
- Coordinates: 51°59′8″N 5°29′55″E
- Country: Netherlands
- Province: Utrecht
- Municipality: Rhenen

Area
  - Total: 10.13 km^{2} (3.91 sq mi)
- Elevation: 10 m (33 ft)

Population (2021)
  - Total: 4,650
  - Density: 459/km^{2} (1,190/sq mi)
- Time zone: UTC+1 (CET)
  - Summer (DST): UTC+2 (CEST)
- Postal code: 3921
- Dialing code: 0318

Elst is a village in the central Netherlands. It is located in the municipality of Rhenen, Utrecht, about 5 km southwest of Veenendaal.

Until 1 January 2006, the western tip of the village was in the municipality of Amerongen.

The village was first mentioned in 1448 as "op Elscher maelstat", and means "place where alder trees grow". Elst developed into a settlement on the southern flank of a hill and became a linear settlement along the Utrecht-Arnhem road. In 1819, a little church was built. The economy during the 19th century was mainly based on the growth of tobacco plants. In 1840, Elst was home to 631 people.

The grist mill 't Wissel was built in 1855. The wind mill was in operation until 1930. Between 1980 and 1981, it was restored and functioned for several bakeries, but ran into technical difficulties. In 2005, it was repaired and occasionally produces fodder.

== Gallery ==
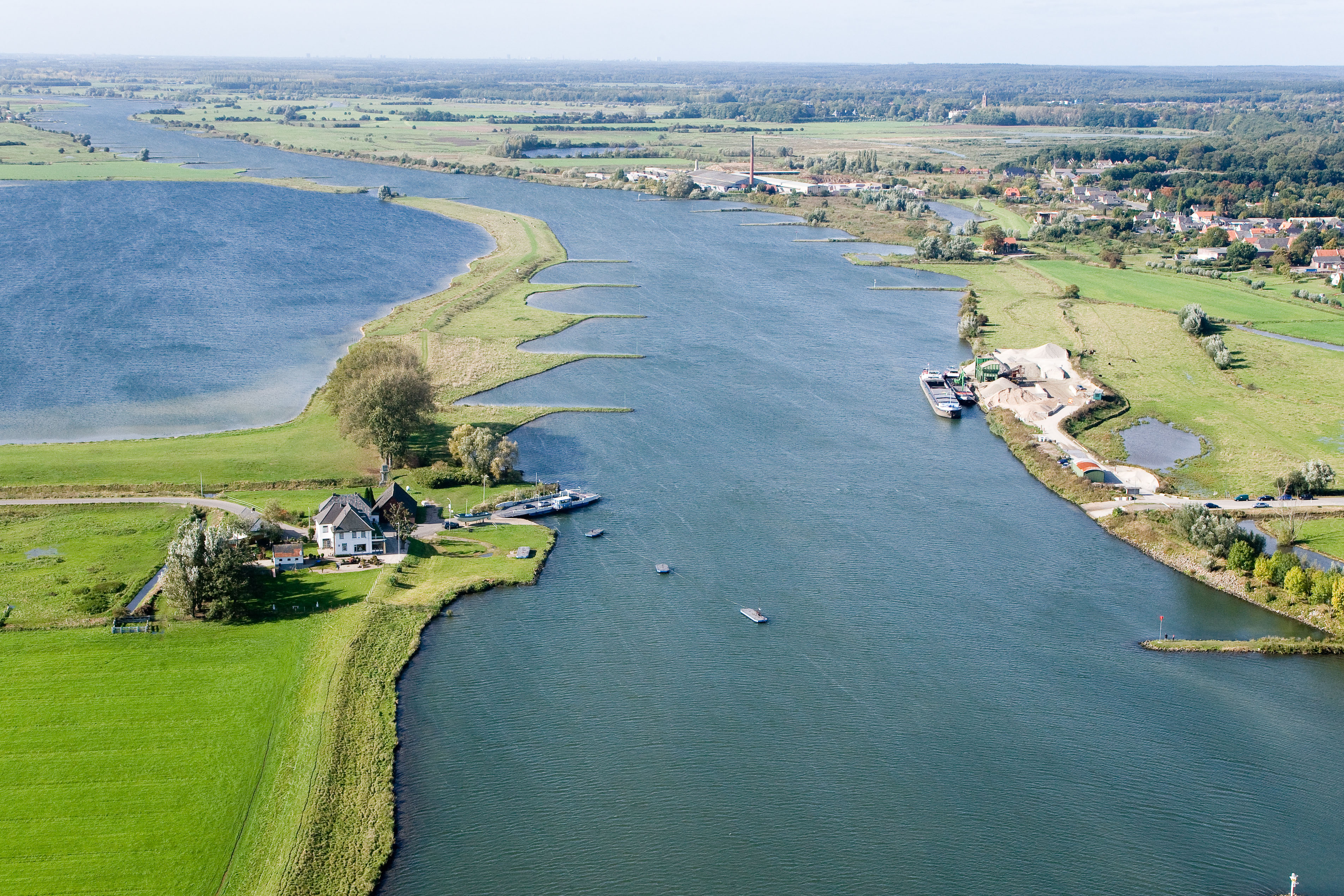
Ferry on Rhine, near Elst

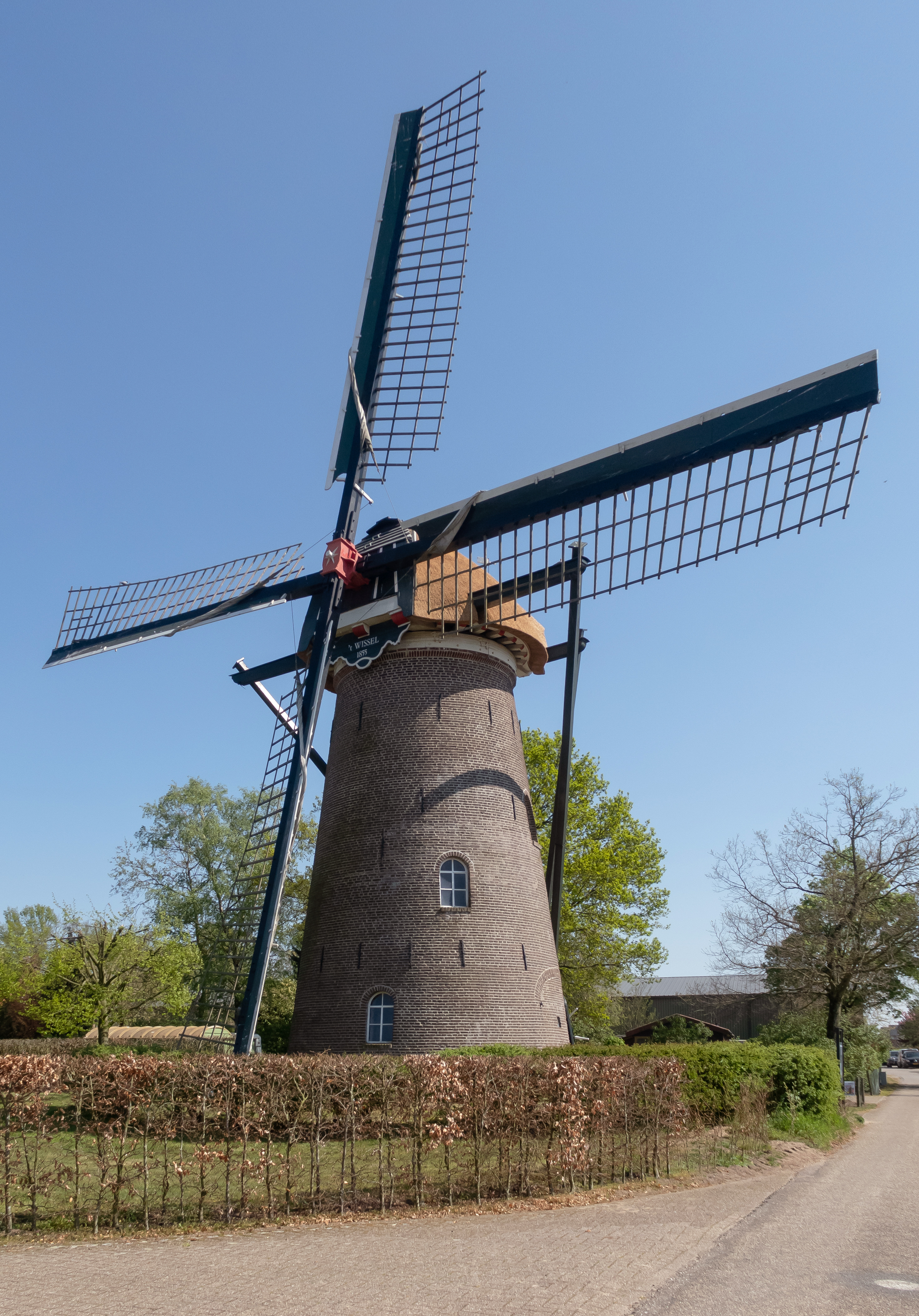
Windmill: korenmolen 't Wissel

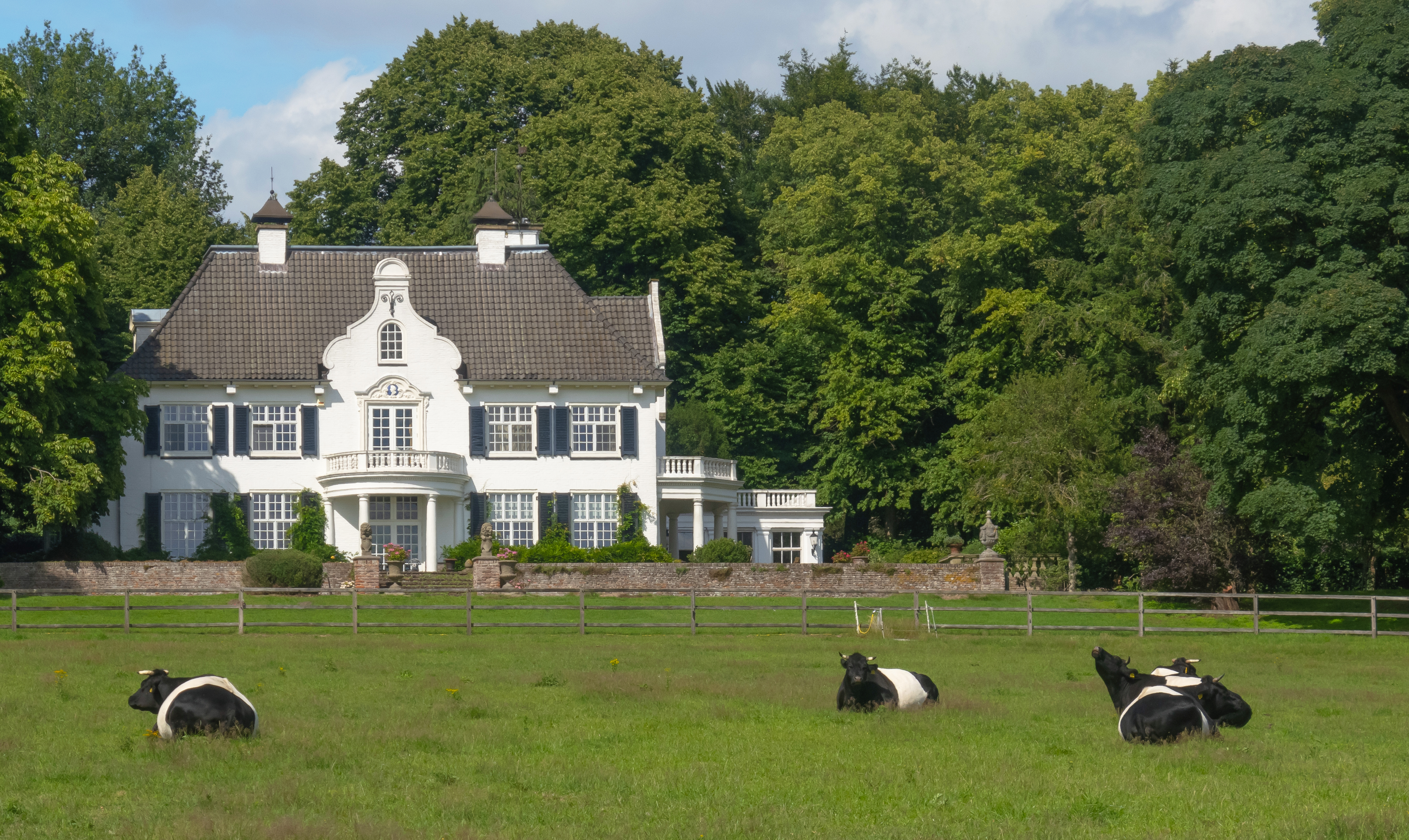
Country house De Tangh
