= Dorothy Ann Thrupp =

British psalmist, hymnwriter and translator

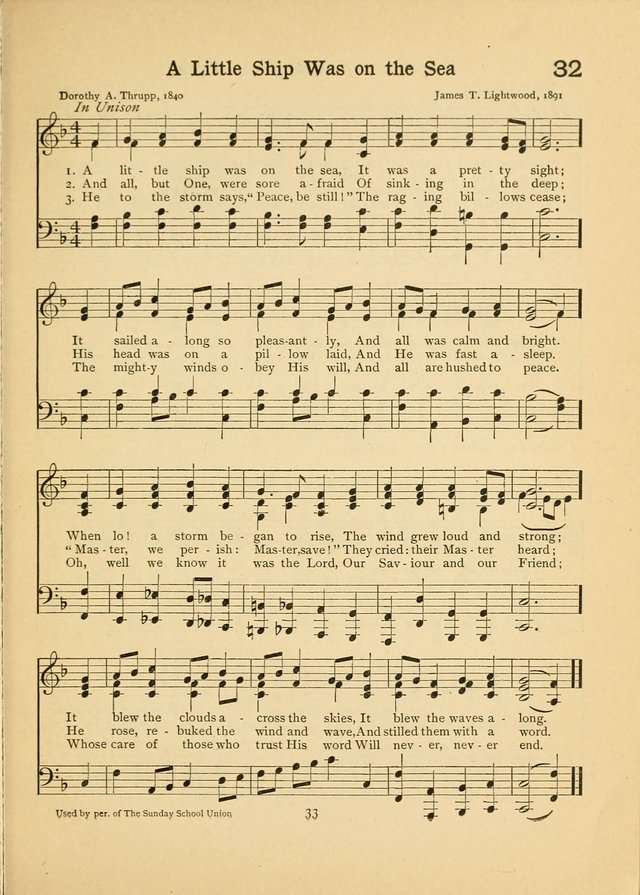
- "A little ship on the sea, It was a pretty sight..."
- Born: 20 June 1779; Paddington Green, London, Middlesex, England
- Died: 14 December 1847 (aged 68); London
- Occupations: Psalmist, hymnwriter, translator
- Relatives: Frederick Thrupp (half-brother); Joseph Francis Thrupp (nephew)
- Writing career
- Pen name: Iota; D. A. T.
- Language: English
- Genre: Hymns
- Subject: Christianity
- Notable work: "Savior, Like a Shepherd Lead us"

Dorothy Ann Thrupp (pseudonyms Iota and D.A.T.; 20 June 1779 – 14 December 1847) was a British psalmist, hymnwriter, and translator. Many of her psalms and hymns, which were published under various pseudonyms, were included in: Friendly Visitor (Rev. William Carus Wilson); Children's Friend (also edited by Carus Wilson); Selection of Hymns and Poetry for the Use of Infant Schools and Nurseries (1838; edited by Mrs. Herbert Mayo); Hymns for the Young (1836; own publisher); and Thoughts for the Day (1836–37; own publication with partly previously published material). Thrupp was the author of Thoughts for the Day that was published in 1837, and Songs by the Way. In addition to these, her hymns were published in magazines edited by Caroline Fry. Thrupp is particularly remembered as a writer of hymns for children. "Savior, Like a Shepherd Lead us" first appeared unsigned in her collection Hymns for the Young, in 1836, with music by William B. Bradbury. Her most popular hymn was for children and it was titled A Little Ship on the Sea. Thrupp died in 1847.

== Early life ==
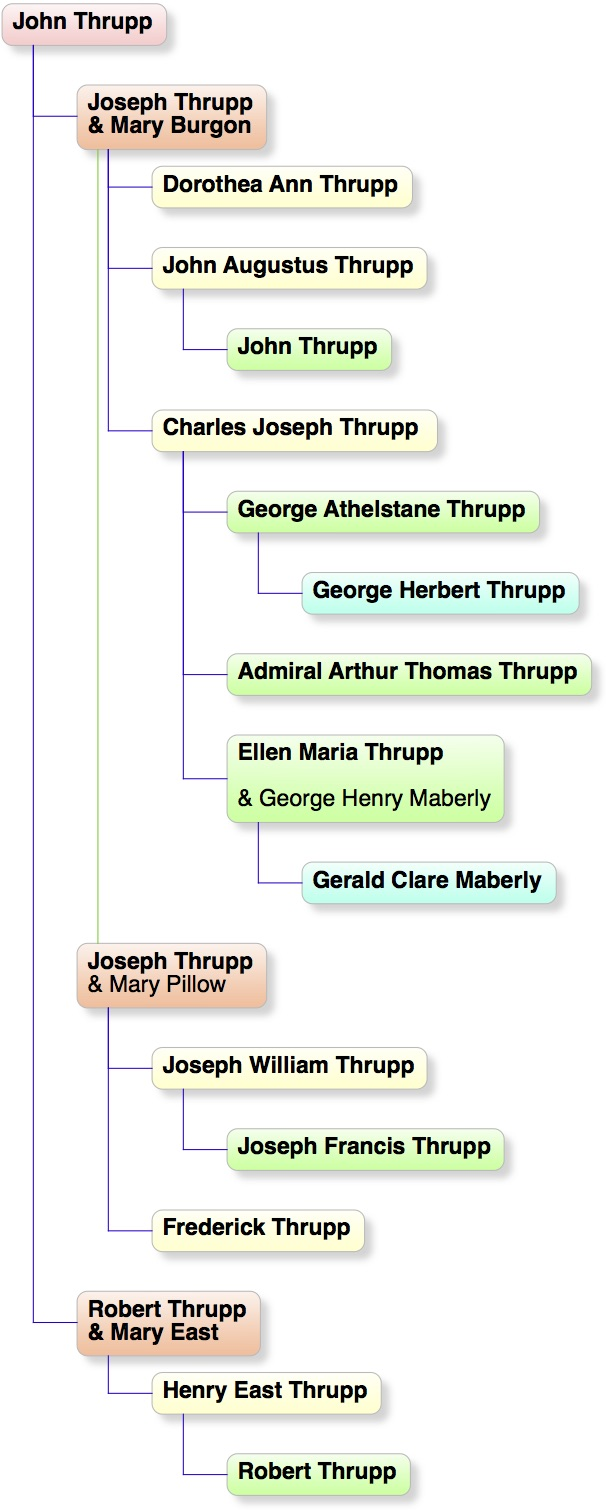
Notable Thrupps

Dorothy (or "Dorothea") Ann Thrupp was born 20 June 1779, in Paddington Green, Middlesex, England. She was a daughter of John Augustus Thrupp (1785–1844) of Spanish Place, Manchester Square, London, and his first wife, Mary Burgon (d. 1795). Her father was a coach builder and his business would, in time, become Thrupp & Maberly. She had two brothers, John and Charles. After her mother's death, her father married Mary Pillow. By this union, Dorothy had two half-brothers: Joseph and Frederick. Joseph Francis Thrupp, churchman, academic, and a writer on the Psalms, was her nephew.

== Career ==
Thrupp spent her entire life in London, where she wrote in children's magazines. Modest in character, avoiding personal publicity, using pen names, Thrupp was not fully credited for her works.

She contributed under the signature "Iota" to some of the juvenile magazines edited by Caroline Fry, and wrote several hymns: one, "A little ship was on the sea", was a great favourite with children. She also published translations from Pascal and Fenelon. Her hymns, a few of which have come into extensive use, were contributed to the Rev. W. C. Wilson's Friendly Visitor and his Children's Friend, under the pen name of "Iota"; to Mrs. Mayo's Selection of Hymns and Poetry for the use of Infant Schools and Nurseries, 1838 (third edition, 1846, which her signature is "D. A. T."; and also to the Hymns for the Young, which she herself edited for the Religious Tract Society (R.T.S.) circa 1830, fourth edition, 1836. In 1836 and 1837, she also published Thoughts for the Day (second series), in which she embodied many hymns which previously appeared in the Friendly Visitor. Another one of her manuals was Songs by the Way.

She died at London, 14 December 1847. (Note: According to Julian (1892), she died on 14 December 1847, in St. Marylebone.) (Note: According to the Dictionary of National Biographies (1892), she died at Hamilton Place, St. John's Wood, in November 1847.)

== Selected works ==
In addition to her hymns, which are annotated under their respective first lines, there are also several works in collections. Several additional hymns to those named above have also been attributed to Thrupp on insufficient authority. This has probably arisen out of the fact that all the hymns in the Hymns for the Young, including her own, were given anonymously.

- "Come, Holy Spirit, come. 0 hear an infant's prayer" was written as a child's prayer. It appeared in Mayo's Selection of Hymns and Poetry, 1838, No. 14, and was signed "D. A. T."
- "God loves the little child that prays" had the theme of God's love for children. It was given in Thrupp's Hymns for the Young, fourth edition, 1836; and again in Mayo's Selection for Children. It was also given in Thrupp's Hymns for the Young, fourth edition, 1836; and again in Mayo's Selection of Hymns and second edition, 1840, and signed "D. A. T." It is sometimes given as "God loves the child that humbly prays."
- "Have you read the wondrous story!" was a hymn about the life and death of Jesus. This appeared anonymously in Thrupp's Hymns for the Young, R. T. S., 1830, Number 12, in six stanzas of 4 1. In Thrupp's later publications, this hymn is omitted, a fact which suggests that it was not her composition, but possibly that of a friend. The hymn is in the Leed's S. S. Union Hymn Book, 1833–78, and several others.
- "Let us sing with one accord" was a hymn praising Jesus. It is usually associated with Thrupp's name, but on insufficient evidence. It is found in the fourth edition of her Hymns for the Young, 1836, and again in the third edition of Mayo's Selection of Hymns and Poetry for the Use of Infant and Juvenile Schools, 1846, and in both instances without signature. There is no evidence which justifies in ascribing the authorship with certainty to Thrupp. The hymn is in the Leed's S. S. Union Hymn Book, 1833–78, and several others.
- "Poor and needy though I be" was a hymn regarding Divine Providence. It appeared in Thrupp's Hymns for the Young, fourth edition, 1836, Number 22; and again in Mayo's Selection of Hymns, second edition, 1840, and signed "D. A. T.".
- "See, my child, the mighty ocean" was a hymn regarding love of God compared to the sea. It was given in the R.T.S.'s Hymns for the Young, fourth edition, 1836, Number 26, and in Mayo's Selection of Hymns, first edition, 1838, and signed "D. A. T." In Kennedy, 1863, it begins "Have you seen the mighty ocean."
- "Thou Guardian of my earliest days" was a hymn about Jesus, the children's friend. It was traced to Thrupp's Hymns for the Young, fourth edition, 1836. It is sometimes given as "Thou Guardian of our earliest days."
- "What a strange and wondrous story" was a hymn about the life and death of Jesus. It was found without signature in her Hymns for the Young, fourth edition, 1836, and again in Mayo's Selections, 1838, Number 17.1, in four stanzas of 4 1. There is no authority for ascribing it to Thrupp. In the Ch. S, S. Hymn Book, (no date), eight lines have been added as a concluding stanza by an unknown author.
- "What led the Son of God!" was a hymn relating to the lore of God in Christ. This appeared anonymously in her Hymns for the Young, 1830, and again in the Leeds S. S. Union Hymn Book, 1833. In more modern collections, it was attributed to Thrupp on the ground that it was found in the Hymns for the Young, which she edited.
- "Who are they in heaven who stand!" was a hymn about All Saints. It was published in Mayo's Selections, third edition, 1846, Number 64, in five stanzas of 4 1., and signed "A. D. T." It is in the Methodist Sunday School Hymnbook, 1879, and others.
