= John Thrupp =

John Thrupp (1817–1870) was an English lawyer and historical writer.

== Life ==
Born on 5 February 1817, he was the eldest son of John Augustus Thrupp (1785–1844) of Spanish Place, Manchester Square, London, son of Grosvenor Square coach maker Joseph Thrupp of Paddington Green, by his first wife, Mary Burgon. Frederick Thrupp was his father's half-brother. His sister, Dorothy Ann Thrupp, was a writer. After education at Dr. Laing's school at Clapham he was articled in 1834 and admitted a solicitor in 1838; he practised at Bell Yard, Doctors' Commons.

After his father died and left him money, Thrupp spent time on archæology and chess, through which he knew Henry Thomas Buckle. He was elected a Fellow of the Royal Geographical Society in November 1861; and of the Ethnological Society of London in the same month.

Thrupp died at Sunnyside, Dorking, on 20 January 1870. He was three times married, but left no issue; one of his wives was Sarah Crowley, aunt of Aleister Crowley.

== Works ==
In 1843 Thrupp published Historical Law Tracts, and in 1862 The Anglo-Saxon Home: a History of the Domestic Institutions and Customs of England from the Fifth to the Eleventh Century

== Notes ==
Attribution

This article incorporates text from a publication now in the public domain: Lee, Sidney, ed. (1898). "Thrupp, John". Dictionary of National Biography. Vol. 56. London: Smith, Elder & Co.
