= Joseph Francis Thrupp =

Joseph Francis Thrupp (1827–1867) was an English churchman and academic, known as a writer on the Psalms, and composer of a setting of the hymn Brightest and Best.

== Life ==
He was the only son of Joseph William Thrupp, a solicitor, of 50 Upper Brook Street, and Merrow House, Guildford, and was born on 20 May 1827. Dorothy Ann Thrupp was his aunt. Frederick Thrupp was his uncle, they were all members of a notable Grosvenor Square coachbuilding family. He was educated at Winchester College under George Moberly from 1840 to 1845, becoming head prefect, and at Trinity College, Cambridge. He graduated B.A. in 1849 as seventh wrangler and eleventh classic, and proceeded M.A. in 1852. He was elected to a fellowship at Trinity, and then travelled in Palestine.

Thrupp was ordained in 1852, and in the same year accepted the college living of Barrington, Cambridgeshire. Thrupp was a member of the board of theological studies at Cambridge, and in 1865 was select preacher. He died at Surbiton on 23 September 1867, and is buried at Merrow. He is commemorated by a window in Trinity College chapel and another in Barrington church, both presented by his widow.

== Works ==
Thrupp published:

- Ancient Jerusalem (1855).
- Introduction to the Psalms, 2 vols. 1860.
- A Translation of the Song of Songs, 1862.

He contributed to the Speaker's Commentary and to William Smith's Dictionary of the Bible.

== Family ==
In 1853 Thrupp married Elizabeth Bligh, fourth daughter of the Rev. John David Glennie of St. Mary's, Park Street.

== Notes ==
Attribution

This article incorporates text from a publication now in the public domain: Lee, Sidney, ed. (1898). "Thrupp, Joseph Francis". Dictionary of National Biography. Vol. 56. London: Smith, Elder & Co.
