= Arthur Thomas Thrupp =

Vice-Admiral Arthur Thomas Thrupp
- Born: 8 June 1828; Paddington
- Died: 4 May 1889 (aged 60); Bideford, Devon
- Military career
- Allegiance: United Kingdom
- Branch: Royal Navy
- Service years: 1843–1888
- Rank: Vice-Admiral
- Conflicts: Crimean War; Second Opium War

Vice-Admiral Arthur Thomas Thrupp (8 June 1828 – 4 May 1889) was an officer of the British Royal Navy during the Crimean War and the Second Opium War, who held several sea commands, including Megaera, which he deliberately beached at the isolated Île Saint-Paul when she became unseaworthy.

== Early life ==
Born in 1828 at Paddington to prosperous Grosvenor Square coachbuilder Charles Joseph Thrupp and Harriet Thrupp née Styan, and the younger brother of George Athelstane Thrupp, Thrupp entered the Royal Navy in 1843.

== Marriage ==
Married Annie Elizabeth Pyke on the 10th April 1861 in Bideford, Devon, England 07 DEC 1832-19 MAY 1925

== Military career ==
Thrupp became a lieutenant on 25 February 1852 and served as lieutenant of HMS Cruiser, which saw service in the Baltic from 1854 to 1855 during the Crimean War. As lieutenant of HMS Nimrod, he saw service in the Far East during the Second Opium War (1856–1860), and was mentioned in dispatches for services at the capture of the Taku (Peiho) Forts on 20 May 1858.

Thrupp was promoted to commander on 17 September 1858, and served as commander aboard HMS Desperate in the North American Station and the West Indies, from 30 July 1862 to 7 November 1863.

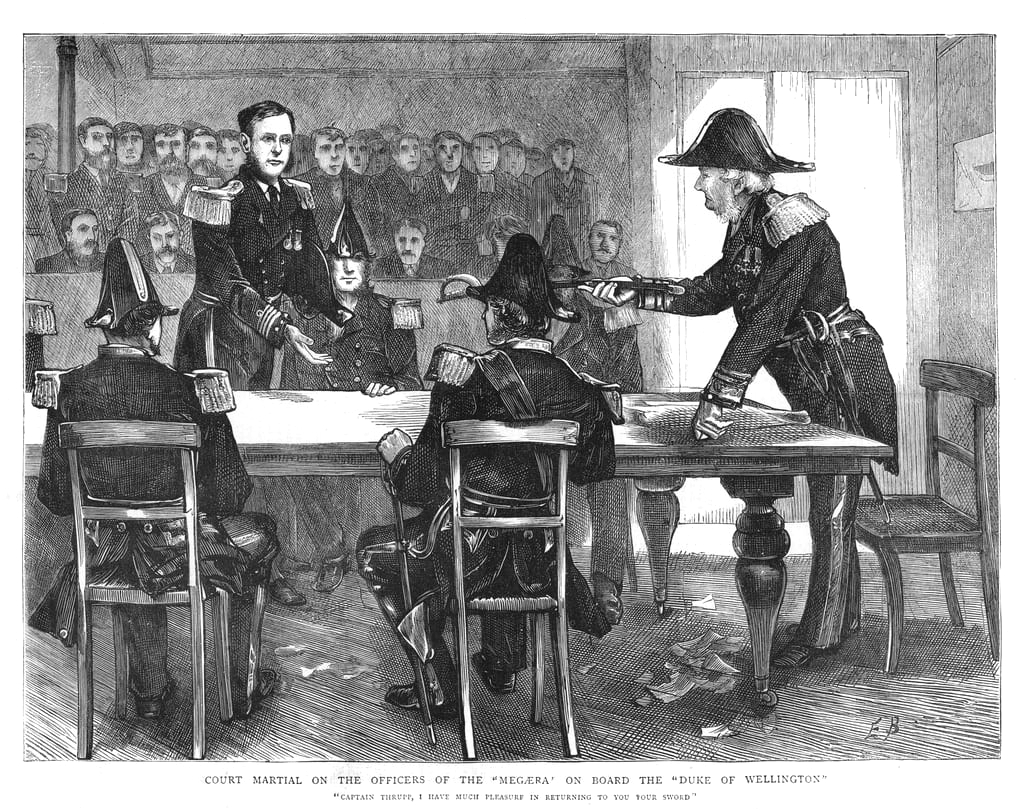
Court Martial on the Officers of the Megaera on board the Duke of Wellington, Captain Thrupp, I have much Pleasure in returning to you your sword. The Graphic 1871

Promoted to captain on 16 December 1865, Thrupp was in command of HMS Megaera when she was wrecked on St. Paul Island in the Antarctic in 1871. He was completely exonerated by the ensuing court martial and subsequently served as captain of HMS Topaze from 21 July 1874 to 22 May 1877.

On 1 April 1878, Thrupp became captain of HMS Resistance as part of the Coast Guard in Liverpool. From 1879 to 1881 he served as naval aide-de-camp to Queen Victoria. On 31 December 1881, he was promoted to rear-admiral, and on 7 July 1885 to retired rear-admiral. His final promotion was on 19 June 1888 when he was promoted to vice-admiral on the retired list.

== Later life ==
Thrupp died at Bideford, Devon on 4 May 1889 at the age of 60.
