= HMS Iris (1840) =

Frigate of the Royal Navy

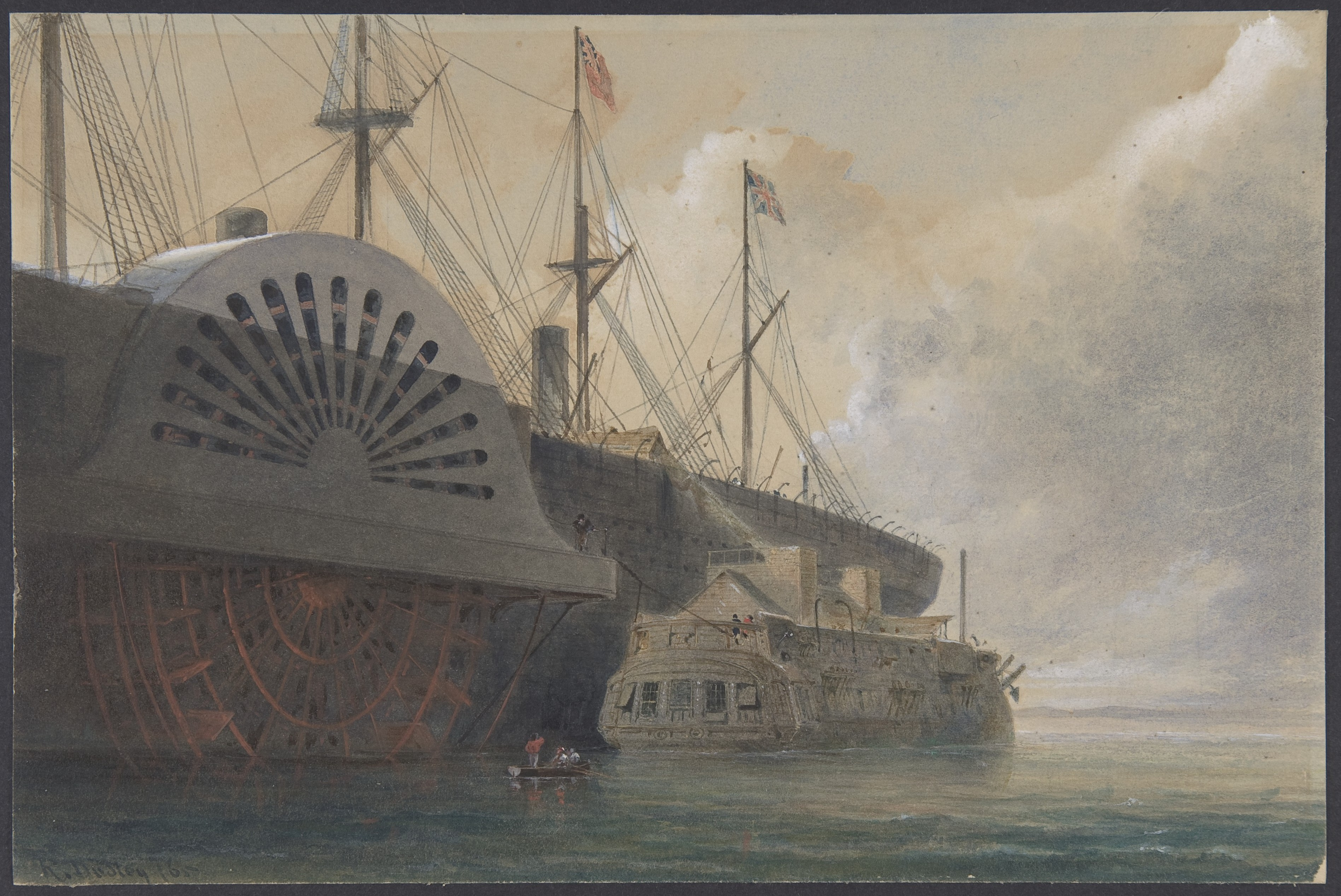
- The old Frigate Iris with her freight of Cable alongside Great Eastern at Sheerness in 1865. The cable passing from the hulk to Great Eastern.

History

United Kingdom
- Name: HMS Iris
- Namesake: Iris (mythology)
- Ordered: 20 February 1837
- Builder: Devonport Dockyard
- Cost: £17,233
- Laid down: September 1838
- Launched: 14 July 1840
- Decommissioned: 16 October 1869
- Fate: Sold as a cable vessel

General characteristics
- Class & type: Spartan-class sixth-rate frigate (later "corvette")
- Displacement: 911 33/94 (bm)
- Length: 131 ft (40 m) (overall); 106 ft 1 in (32.33 m) (keel)
- Beam: 40 ft 6 1/4 in (12.351 m)
- Depth of hold: 10 ft 9 in (3.28 m)
- Sail plan: Full-rigged ship
- Complement: 240
- Armament: Upperdeck: 18 × 24-pounder guns; QD: 6 × 32-pounder guns; Fc: 2 × 32-pounder gunnades

HMS Iris was a 26-gun sixth-rate frigate launched on 14 July 1840 from Devonport Dockyard. She spent some time with the West Africa Squadron suppressing the slave trade and later with the East Indies Station was involved in operations in Borneo. Iris was the first flagship of the Australia Station between 1859 and 1861 during which time she participated in the First Taranaki War. In 1864 she was extensively modified to allow her to ferry transatlantic telegraph cable to the cable-laying ship Great Eastern. She was decommissioned and sold off in 1869.

== Service ==
=== 1840–1861 ===
Between 1840 and 15 August 1843, she served with the West Africa Squadron. On 28 April 1841, her ship's boats were involved in burning the warehouses and other property of Niara Bely in Farenya, on the Pongo River.

Iris was subsequently assigned to the East Indies Station. In 1844 she raced the French ships Sirène, Sabine and Victorieuse at Singapore and beat them. In July 1846 Iris was part of an expedition along the Brune River in Borneo under Rear-Admiral Thomas John Cochrane to destroy forts and batteries there. Her captain G. Rodney Mundy led a returning force of 476 men from six Royal Navy vessels along the Borneo River later that month.

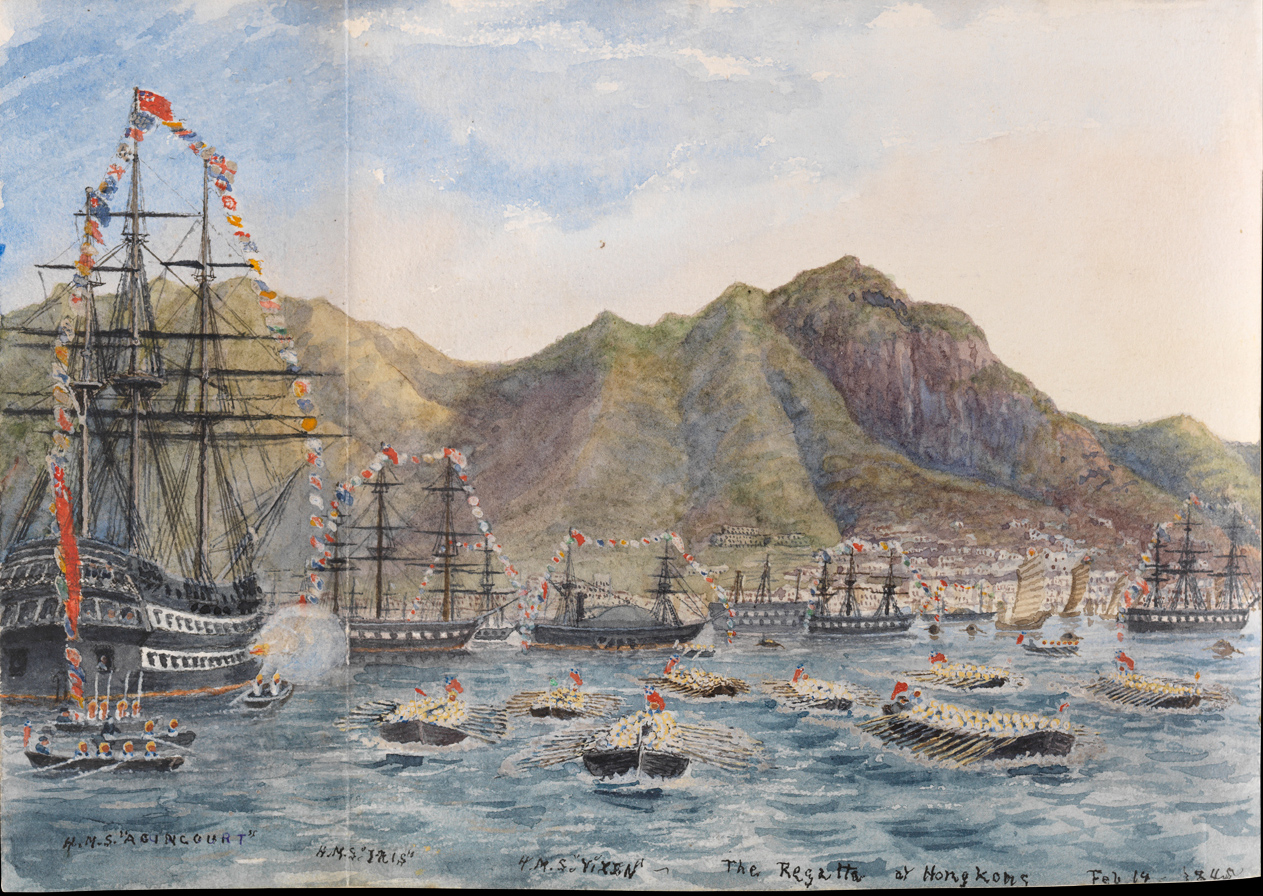
HMS Iris 1845- Regatta Hong Kong

She was the flagship of the Australian Squadron between 1859 and 1860 under the command of Captain William Loring. She participated in the attack on Puketakauere pā, during the First Taranaki War and left the Australia Station in 1861.

=== 1862–1869 ===
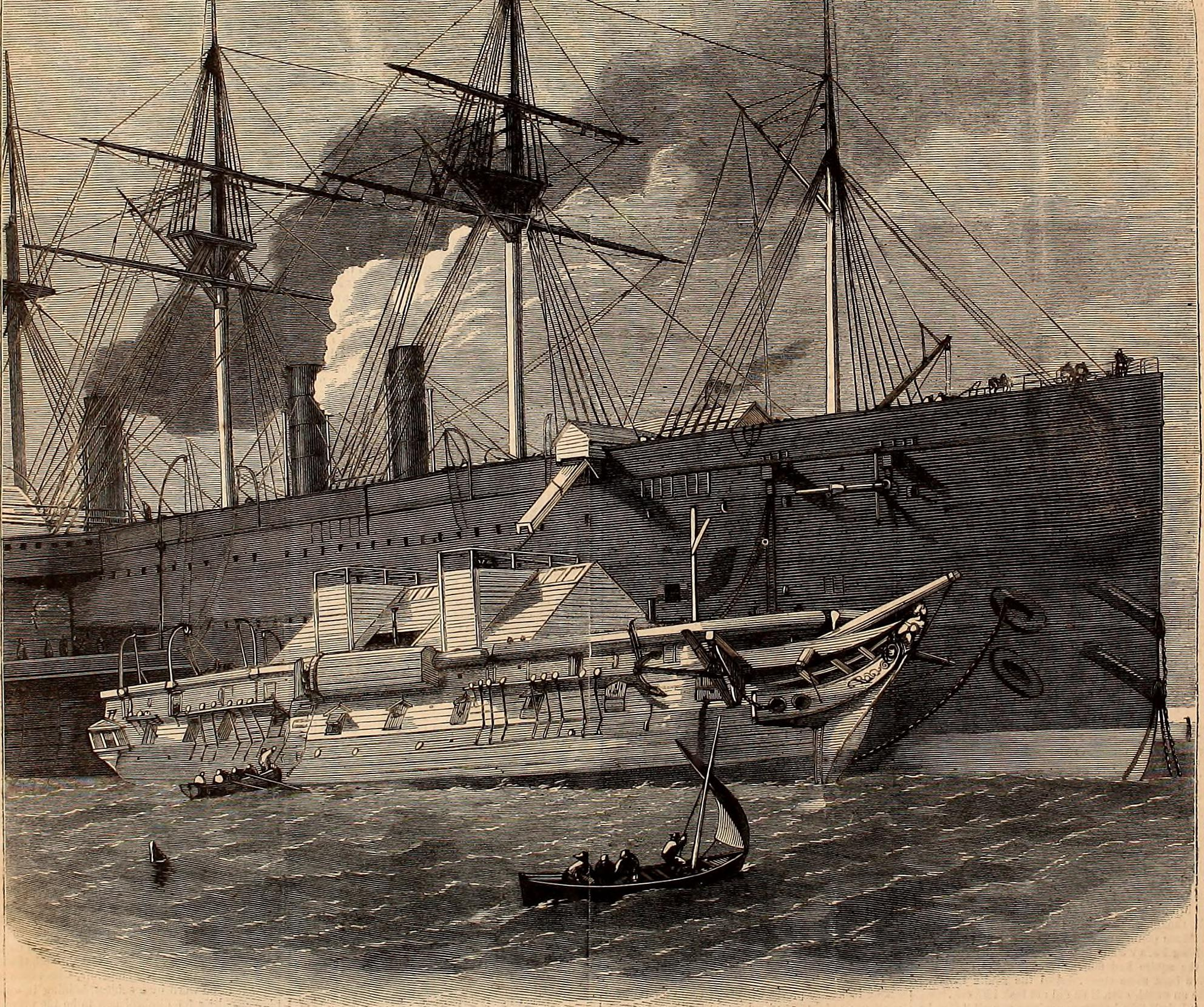
Alongside the "Great Eastern"

Together with HMS Amethyst, she was loaned by the Admiralty to the Atlantic Telegraph Company in 1864 and both ships were then extensively modified in 1865 for ferrying the Atlantic cable from the manufacturer's works at Enderby's Wharf, in East Greenwich, London, to the Great Eastern at her Sheerness mooring. The cable was coiled down into great cylindrical tanks at the wharf before being fed into the Great Eastern. Amethyst and Iris transferred 2,500 miles (4,000 km) of cable to Great Eastern, in an operation that took over three months, beginning in February 1865.

Both ships were used again for the same purpose in 1866 and 1869 by the Telegraph Construction & Maintenance Company (Telcon). As obsolete sailing vessels which had to be towed while ferrying cable, neither ship was capable of independent operation, and both were described as "hulks" in contemporary reports. Also in 1866 HMS Iris was loaned to help in the recovery of the steamer Foyle, which had sunk in collision with the steamer Collingwood off Barking in the Thames on 12 September. The Sail and Steam Navy List notes that according to Admiralty records, HMS Iris and HMS Amethyst were sold to the Telegraph Construction and Maintenance Company (Telcon) after being decommissioned on 16 October 1869.
