= James Bower =

James Bower may refer to:

- Jamie Campbell Bower (born 1988), English actor, singer and former model
- James Bower (agrarian leader) (1860–1921), farmer and farm leader in western Canada
- James M. Bower (born 1954), American neuroscientist
- James Paterson Bower (1806–1889), Scottish Royal Navy admiral
