= HMS Sandfly (1872) =

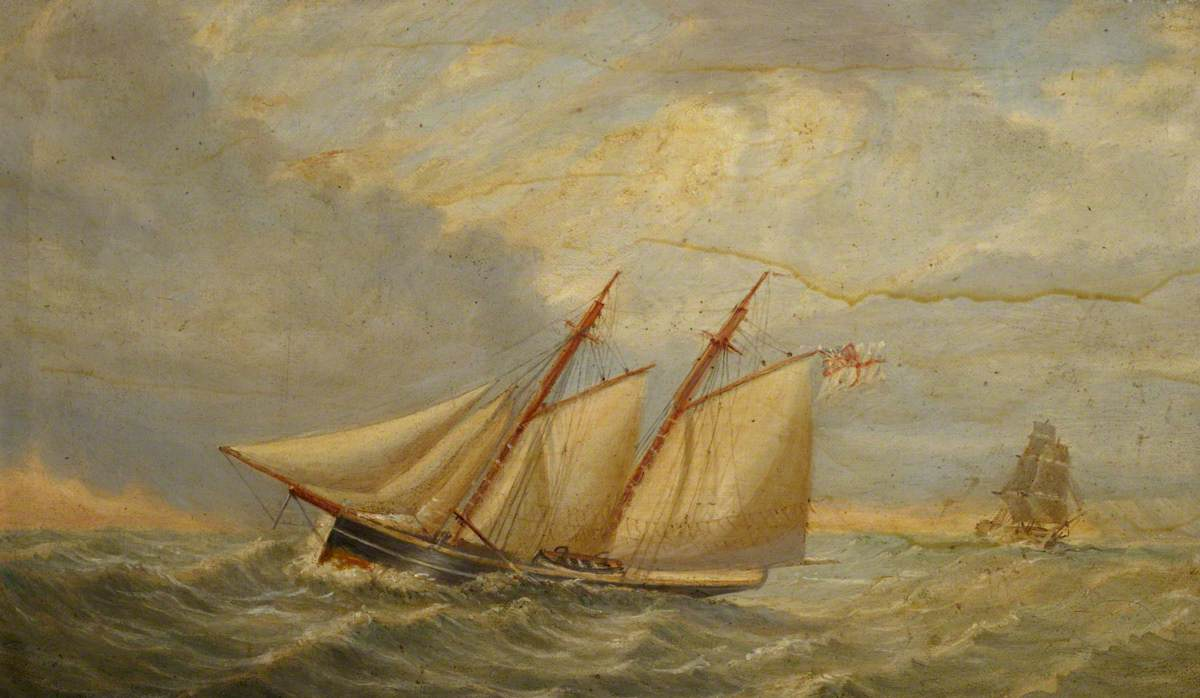

History

United Kingdom
- Name: HMS Sandfly
- Builder: John Cuthbert, Millers Point, New South Wales
- Launched: 5 December 1872
- Decommissioned: 1883
- Fate: Sold in 1883 to Tonga; wrecked 1892

General characteristics
- Type: Beagle-class schooner
- Tons burthen: 120 bm
- Length: 77 ft 0 in (23.5 m)
- Beam: 18 ft 6 in (5.6 m)
- Depth of hold: 8 ft 6 in (2.59 m)
- Sail plan: Schooner
- Complement: 27
- Armament: 1 × 12-pounder gun

HMS Sandfly was a schooner of the Royal Navy, built by John Cuthbert, Millers Point, New South Wales and launched on 5 December 1872. She commenced service on the Australia Station at Sydney in 1873 for anti-blackbirding operations in the South Pacific. She was paid off in 1883 and purchased for the Tongan Government by the Reverend S W Baker retaining the name Sandfly.

== Voyages ==
The Sandfly was assigned to Australia Station at Sydney till June 1873. Her maiden voyage was short tour to the South Seas islands. In October, under Lieutenant W H Nowell, she seized the brig Aurora for breaching the Imperial Labour Act, which banned the practice of blackbirding. Her second voyage in 1874 was to New Guinea to assist with surveying, but she was caught in a storm and had her rudder damaged. After receiving assistance from HMS Basilisk she returned to Sydney. Her next voyage took her to the Santa Cruz Islands where on 17 September she came under attack by a large group of islanders in canoes. After a brief but fierce skirmish a breeze came up and she was able to make good her escape. Santa Cruz islanders had attacked and massacred the crew of the Lapwing several months earlier.

== The Sandfly Incident ==
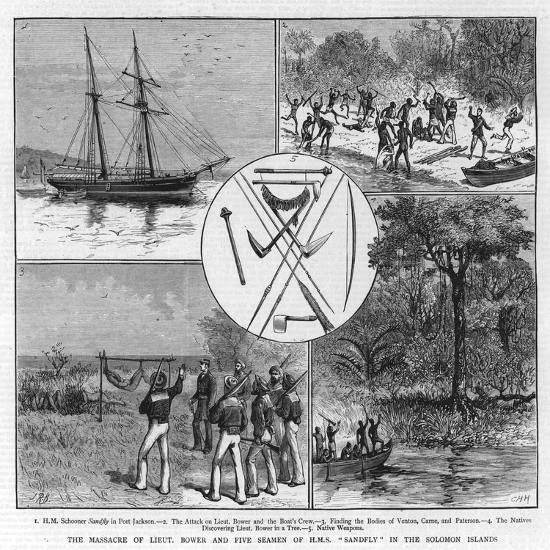
The Massacre of Lieutenant Bower and Five Seamen of HMS Sandfly in the Solomon Islands. The Graphic 1881

In 1880 the Sandfly was tasked with undertaking hydrographic surveys work in the Solomon Islands and New Guinea under the command of Lieutenant James Bower, the 27-year-old son of Admiral James Paterson Bower. On 13 October 1880 the Sandfly anchored at Guadalcanal. Lieutenant Bower then took the ship's whaleboat to the Nggela Islands with five sailors from the Sandfly to survey the east coast of Nggela Pile. They camped on Mandoliana Island, a small island opposite Nggela Pile. A group of four islanders from Gaeta led by Vuria who was the son of Kalekona, a big man, saw them and attacked Bower and his party.

Four of the sailors were killed in the initial attack. Bower managed to escape and hid, but was later found and killed by the islanders. The surviving sailor managed to elude the attackers and swim 16 kilometres to Honggo on Nggela Pile where he was rescued and taken to safety by another islander. When the party did not return as expected on 20 October the Sandfly began a search. On 22 October it located the surviving sailor and hearing of the attack sailed into Rita Bay, opposite Mandoliana Island, to exact reprisals on the islanders. None were found so the crew burnt several canoes that were on the beach. When they were leaving a group of islanders came out of the surrounding bush and opened fire on the sailors, killing one and wounding another. The Sandfly then returned to Sydney and reported the incident.

HMS Emerald under Captain William Maxwell was dispatched to the Nggela Islands in December to locate the attackers. Being unable to do so the crew of the Emerald set fire to numerous islanders' houses, cut down fruit trees and destroyed canoes in reprisal for this and other incidents. Approximately 33 villages were destroyed. The English Government was not satisfied with the outcome and sent Commander James Bruce on HMS Cormorant, along with HMS Alert. The ships were joined in the Solomons by HMS Renard. Bruce blockaded the islands and declared war on them unless they handed over the attackers within 14 days. With this turn of events Bishop John Selwyn, who was visiting the islands intervened and persuaded Kalekona to give up the perpetrators, including his son. The four natives who accompanied Vuria were executed, but Vuria managed to escape and went into hiding. Vuria continued to be unsuccessfully hunted by the British for some years after his escape.

== Merchant career ==
After the ship's acquisition by the Tongan government in 1883 she sailed as a 76-ton schooner principally between Tonga and New Zealand.

In late September or early October 1886 the French steamer Decres notified authorities in Fiji that it had witnessed a volcanic eruption on Niuatoputapu, Tonga. Once Tongan authorities had visited the island the Sandfly among other ships was used to supply provisions to the islanders.

In December 1887 she was transferred into the ownership of Tongans and chartered by Messrs Donald and Edenborough for use in the island trade.

In 1889 she was sold to Captain W T Fitzpatrick of Sydney. In January 1891 the Sandfly''s Chief Officer Sam Craig was shot and killed by Solomon Islands natives on Makira while he and three crew members were landing to collect copra from the island. The reason for the shooting was unknown but the man who shot Craig had recently been returned to the island by the Sandfly. HMS Royalist and the gunboat HMS Ringdove of the Australian Squadron were sent to the Solomons to avenge the murder of Craig and a later unrelated murder of an English trader, Fred Howard. The Sandfly, which was in the Solomons when the Royalist arrived, accompanied it to the location of Craig's murder.

On 3 December 1892, while loading copra at Makira under Captain Fitzgerald, the Sandfly was swept onto rocks by the tide and wrecked. The crew had tried to tow the schooner away from the rocks before it founded but were unable to do so. They had also found that the water was to deep for the ship's anchors to purchase. All 5 crew on board the Sandfly were able to leave the boat as the weather was calm at the time and make their way to the settlement on Ugi Island. The Marine Board of Inquiry found the crew had done all they reasonably could be expected to do under the circumstances.

A February 1893 report stated that Captain Fitzpatrick had been murdered by natives in the Solomon Islands a few months earlier.

== See also ==
- List of massacres in the Solomon Islands
