= Cyprian Bridge =

Royal Navy Admiral (1839–1924)

Admiral Sir Cyprian Bridge GCB
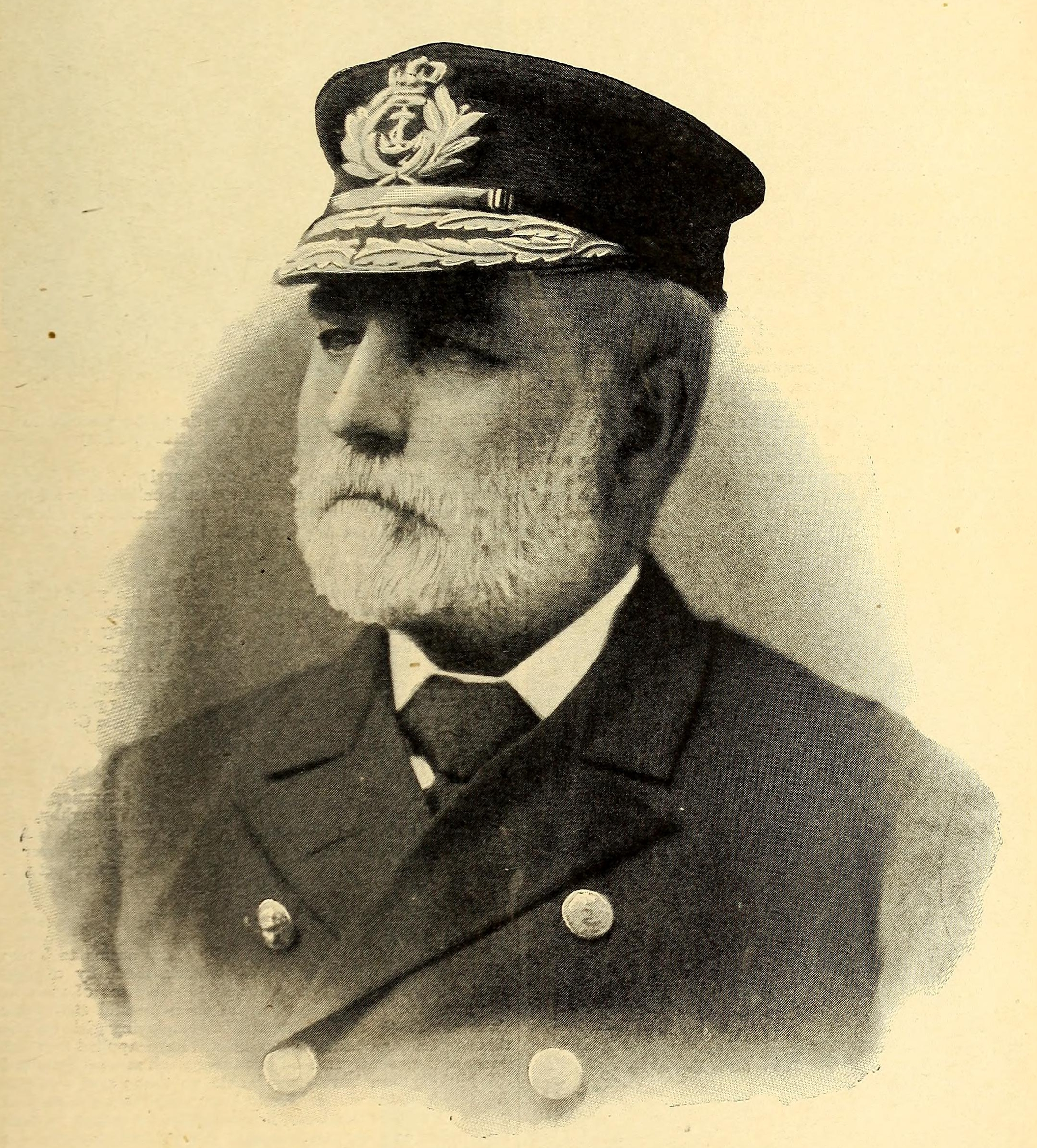
- Born: 13 March 1839; St. John's, Newfoundland
- Died: 16 August 1924 (aged 85); Kingston Hill, Surrey
- Relatives: Cyprian Bridge (uncle)
- Military career
- Allegiance: United Kingdom
- Branch: Royal Navy
- Rank: Admiral
- Commands: HMS Colossus
- Conflicts: Crimean War; World War I
- Awards: Knight Grand Cross of the Order of the Bath

Admiral Sir Cyprian Arthur George Bridge GCB (13 March 1839 – 16 August 1924) was a British Royal Navy officer towards the end of the era of Pax Britannica. He was Commander-in-chief of both the Australian Squadron and the China Squadron.

== Early life ==
Bridge's father was Thomas Hobday Bridge, later Archdeacon of St. John's. His maternal grandfather was John Dunscombe, an aide-de-camp to the governor of Newfoundland. From 1851 Bridge attended school at Walthamstow House in England.

== Naval career ==
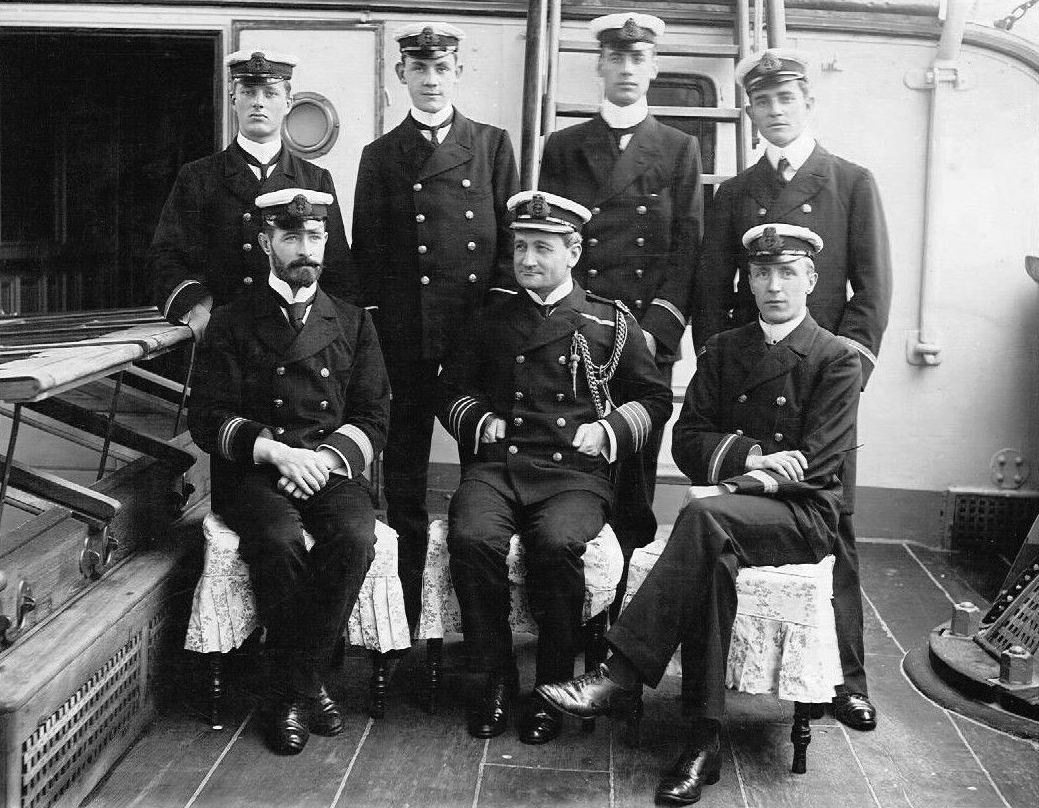
Admiral Sir Cyprian Bridge, Commander-in-Chief, China Station, with staff in 1902

Bridge was nominated for the navy by Admiral Cochrane, to whom his father had been chaplain. He passed the navy entrance examination in 1853, and was appointed to the paddle sloop HMS Medea and later to the third-rate ship of the line HMS Cumberland, flagship of the North American Station.

During the Crimean War, Bridge served as a naval cadet in the White Sea. In Autumn 1854, a squadron of three warships led by the sloop HMS Miranda shelled and destroyed Kola. An attempt to storm Arkhangelsk proved abortive, as was the siege of Petropavlovsk in Kamchatka. While the Anglo-French naval squadron successfully shelled the town, a landing of 800 sailors and marines was repulsed.

After he passed for midshipman, Bridge was appointed to the corvette HMS Pelorus in the East Indies. Prior to that ship's engagements in the First Taranaki War, he had been promoted in 1859, joining H MS Algiers in the Mediterranean as lieutenant. He subsequently served on board HMS Hawke on the Irish station, and HMS Fawn in the West Indies from 1864 to 1867.

Bridge transferred to HMS Excellent to qualify in gunnery. Admiral Sir Alfred Ryder then invited him to act as his flag lieutenant in the Channel Fleet. In 1869 he was promoted to commander, serving two years with the broadside ironclad HMS Caledonia in the Mediterranean. He served for one year each on the gunnery ship HMS Cambridge and then HMS Implacable, followed by Ryder's flagship in the China Station, the battleship HMS Audacious.

In 1877 Bridge was promoted to captain. He took half pay and spent time writing on the German Navy, publishing in the Journal of the Royal United Services Institution. During 1878 and 1879 he served on Admiralty and War Office committees on heavy guns, armour plate and projectiles.

Bridge was appointed deputy commissioner for the Western Pacific, with command of the Osprey class sloop HMS Espiegle in Australia. Subsequently, he was appointed to command the modern battleship HMS Colossus. He was Director of Naval Intelligence at the Admiralty from 1889 to 1894 and helped found the Navy Records Society in 1893 with naval historian Sir John Knox Laughton.

In November 1894 Bridge was promoted to rear-admiral and became Commander-in-Chief of the Australian squadron aboard the cruiser HMS Orlando. In 1898 he was promoted vice-admiral. He was appointed Knight Commander of the Order of the Bath (KCB) in the 1899 Birthday Honours. He was appointed Commander-in-Chief of the China Station in 1901, arriving in Yokohama in early June where he hoisted his flag in the battleship HMS Glory. In 1903 he was promoted admiral. He retired from the Navy in March 1904.

== Post naval career ==
Bridge was an assessor on the North Sea Enquiry Commission investigation into the 1904 Dogger Bank incident. He was Admiralty Representative on the Royal Patriotic Fund Corporation from 1906 to 1912. In 1916 he was part of the Mesopotamia Commission of Inquiry.

== Family ==
Bridge's grandfather and great uncles had all served in the Navy. His father did not due to poor eyesight. Bridge married but had no children.

Cyprian Bridge Island is named after his uncle, Major Cyprian Bridge (c1807-1883) of the British Army.

He built Coombe Pines in Kingston Hill, Surrey, where he died in 1924.

Military offices
Preceded by William Hall	Director of Naval Intelligence; 1889–1894	Succeeded by Lewis Beaumont
Preceded by Nathaniel Bowden-Smith	Commander-in-Chief, Australia Station; 1894–1897	Succeeded by Hugo Pearson
Preceded by Sir Edward Seymour	Commander-in-Chief, China Station; 1901–1904	Succeeded by Sir Gerard Noel
