= Henry Fairfax (Royal Navy officer) =

Royal Navy Admiral (1837–1900)

Admiral Sir Henry Fairfax KCB FRGS
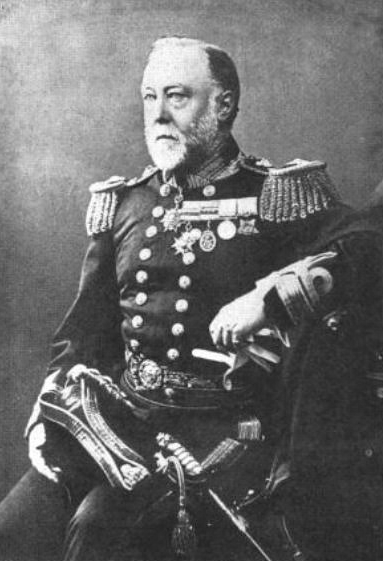
- Born: 21 January 1837; Edinburgh, Scotland
- Died: 20 March 1900 (aged 63); Naples, Italy
- Military career
- Allegiance: United Kingdom
- Branch: Royal Navy
- Service years: 1850–1900
- Rank: Admiral
- Commands: HMS Forte; HMS Volage; HMS Monarch; Australia Station; Channel Fleet; Plymouth Command
- Conflicts: Anglo-Egyptian War
- Awards: Knight Commander of the Order of the Bath

Admiral Sir Henry Fairfax KCB FRGS (21 January 1837 – 20 March 1900) was a Royal Navy officer who went on to serve as Commander-in-Chief, Plymouth.

== Naval career ==
Fairfax was born in 1837, the third son of Sir Henry Fairfax, 1st Baronet. He joined the Royal Navy in December 1850, and during early years was posted to HMS Amphitrite, which took him on two trips to the Behring Strait and the Arctic Sea. Promoted to lieutenant on 25 August 1858, he served on board the sloop HMS Ariel and on 4 November 1862 was promoted to commander for "distinguished valour in the capture of a pirate slaver". He was promoted to captain on 3 April 1868, and served as naval attaché on a special mission to the Sultan of Zanzibar in 1872–73. On his return he served for nearly 12 months as private secretary to George Goschen, First Lord of the Admiralty. In 1874, as commander of HMS Volage, he led an astronomical expedition to Kerguelen Islands in the southern Indian Ocean, and remained with her as Senior Officer South East Coast of America Station until 1877. He was captain of Britannia, the Royal Navy Officer training establishment between 1877 and 1882, during which years the Princes Albert Victor and George stayed there for preparatory naval training. He was appointed Naval Aide-de-camp to Queen Victoria in 1882, a Companion of the Order of the Bath (CB), and a Fellow of the Royal Geographical Society (FRGS).

After thirty years in the navy, Fairfax saw his first active war service when he was in command of HMS Monarch at the bombardment of Alexandria during the Anglo-Egyptian War of 1882, and he was subsequently in command of the naval and marine forces which seized and occupied Port Said. He was promoted to flag rank as rear admiral on 1 July 1885. In February 1887 he received appointment as commander-in-chief of Australia Station, the description given to the naval command of British colonial possessions in Australia and South Pacific and, on his return to the United Kingdom he became Second Naval Lord on 24 October 1889. He was promoted to vice-admiral on 20 July 1891, and served from 1892 to 1895 as commander of the Channel Fleet, which was historically charged with defending the waters of the English Channel.

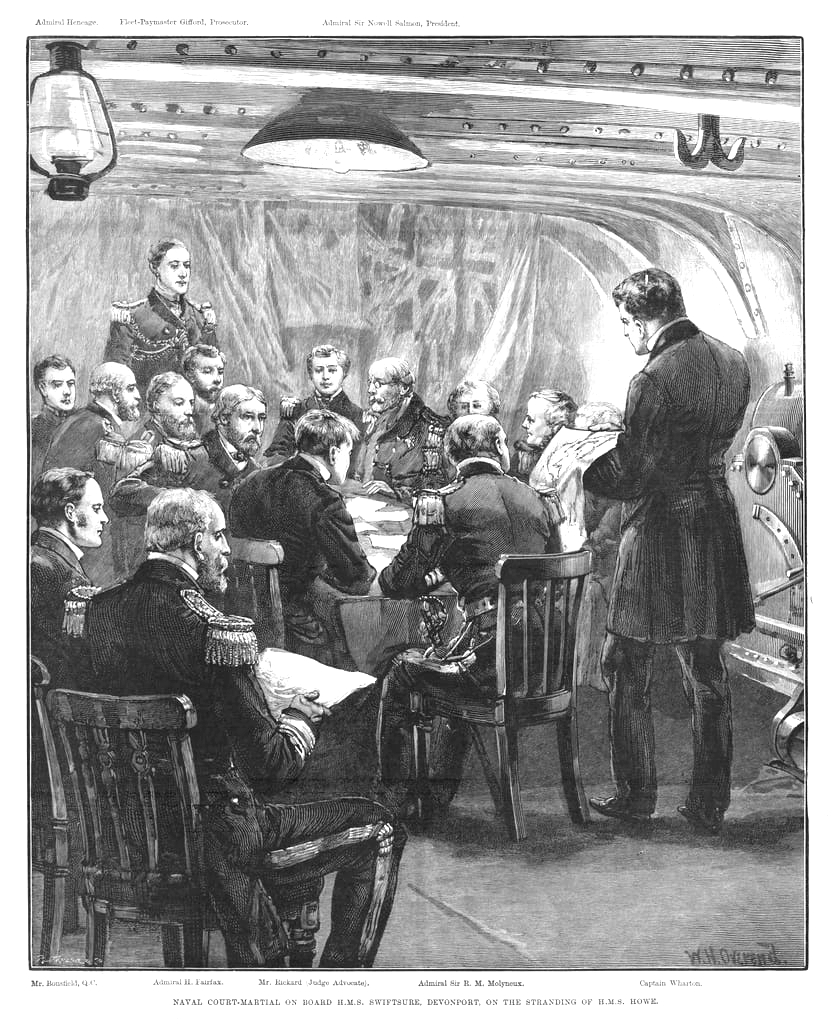
The Trial by Court-Martial at Devonport on HMS Swiftsure of Vice-Admiral Henry Fairfax, CB, in Connection with the stranding of HMS Howe at Ferrol on 2 November 1892. Illustrated London News 1893

In November 1892, HMS Howe stranded on rocks at the entrance to Ferrol Harbour; Fairfax as officer commanding the squadron was court-martialled but was acquitted on the grounds that the chart in use was unreliable. He was promoted to Knight Commander of the Order of the Bath (KCB) in the May 1896 Birthday Honours.

Promoted to admiral on 10 May 1897, he was in 1899 appointed Commander-in-Chief, Plymouth, serving as such until he died.

He was a deputy lieutenant and a justice of the peace for Roxburghshire, in which county he owned property.

Fairfax died in Naples in March 1900, while staying there for health reasons on leave of absence from his command. His widow received personal telegraphs of condolences from Queen Victoria and the Duke of York (future King George V) after his death.

== Family ==
In 1872 he married Harriet Kinloch, daughter of Sir David Kinloch.

Military offices
Preceded by George Tryon	Commander-in-Chief, Australia Station; 1887–1889	Succeeded by Lord Charles Montagu Douglas Scott
Preceded by Sir Richard Hamilton	Second Naval Lord; 1889–1892	Succeeded by Sir Frederick Richards
Preceded by Sir Michael Culme-Seymour	Commander-in-Chief, Channel Fleet; 1892–1894	Succeeded by Sir Robert FitzRoy
Preceded by Sir Edmund Fremantle	Commander-in-Chief, Plymouth; 1899–1900	Succeeded by Lord Charles Montagu Douglas Scott
