= Bakia, Guinea =

Bakia
- populated settlement
- Location in Guinea
- Coordinates: 10°06′N 13°57′W
- Country: Guinea
- Region: Boké Region
- Prefecture: Boffa Prefecture
- Elevation: 180 ft (55 m)
- Time zone: UTC+0 (GMT)

Bakia is a populated settlement in the Boffa Prefecture, Boké Region, Guinea.

== History ==
Emmanuel Gomez, senior, a Portuguese slave trader gained control of Bakia in the eighteenth century. His son, Emmanuel Gomez, junior succeeded him and his daughter Niara Bely married and became ruler of nearby Farenya.
