= William Henry Maxwell (Royal Navy officer) =

Royal Navy Admiral (1840-1920)

Admiral William Henry Maxwell
- Born: 13 June 1840
- Died: 1 July 1920 (aged 80)
- Military career
- Rank: Admiral
- Commands: HMS Emerald; HMS Neptune; Commodore in Charge at Hong Kong

William Henry Maxwell was an officer of the Royal Navy who rose to the rank of Admiral. He served on the Cape of Good Hope Station, Australia Station, and as the Commodore in Charge at Hong Kong.

Maxwell entered the Royal Navy as a Cadet in 1854. He served in the frigate HMS Euryalus in the Baltic Campaign in 1854–1856 and was appointed midshipman in 1856.

He was promoted to mate, then to the rank of lieutenant, in January 1860, when he was serving in HMS Boscawen on the Cape of Good Hope Station from May 1856 to March 1860. He was transferred to HMS Lyra, and from March 1860 to January 1862, the ship was engaged on the east coast of Africa suppressing the slave trade, seizing a Spanish slaving barque and 18–20 Arab slave dhows, and freeing and landing 200 slaves on the Seychelles. From May 1863 to September 1866 he served on HMS Sutlej in the Pacific Ocean. He was made commander on 6 July 1866. During 1868 and 1869, he served on HMS Octavia and HMS Dryad in the Indian Ocean, voyaging to the East Indies. An Arab slave dhow was taken as prize off the coast of Madagascar, and 200 slaves were freed and landed on the Seychelles. Maxwell served at the School of Gunnery, Portsmouth, from November 1869 to November 1872. He was promoted to the rank of captain on 29 November 1872.

He took command of HMS Emerald on 2 July 1878 on the Pacific Station. In December 1880, the Emerald was sent to investigate the death of Lieutenant Bower and four crew of the schooner HMS Sandfly who were killed in the Nggela Islands in October 1880. The Emerald spend two months attempting to locate the attackers. Being unable to do so the Emerald destroyed approximately 33 villages as well as cutting down fruit trees and destroying canoes in reprisal for the Sandfly incident.

The Emerald, under Captain Maxwell, visited the Ellice Islands in 1881. His command of Emerald ceased on 2 September 1882. He took command of HMS Neptune on 28 March 1883 for service with the Channel Fleet. His command of Neptune ceased on 1 April 1885.

Maxwell was appointed as the Commodore in Charge at Hong Kong from February 1887 to December 1888. He returned to England and was promoted to the rank of rear-admiral in 1889 and vice-admiral in 1894. He was placed on the Retired List in 1895, and he was advanced to the rank of admiral on the Retired List in 1900.
