= HMS Pelorus (1857) =

History

United Kingdom
- Name: HMS Pelorus
- Builder: Devonport Dockyard
- Launched: 5 February 1857
- Decommissioned: 1868
- Fate: Broken up, 1869

General characteristics
- Class & type: Pearl-class corvette
- Displacement: 2,290 long tons (2,327 t)
- Tons burthen: 1464 bm
- Length: 225 ft 3 in (68.66 m) oa; 200 ft (61 m) (gundeck)
- Beam: 40 ft 4 in (12.29 m)
- Draught: 17 ft 3 in (5.26 m) (forward); 20 ft 6 in (6.25 m) (aft)
- Depth of hold: 23 ft 11 in (7.29 m)
- Installed power: 400 nominal horsepower; 1,408 ihp (1,050 kW)
- Propulsion: 2-cyl. horizontal single expansion; Single screw
- Sail plan: Full-rigged ship
- Speed: 10.9 knots (20.2 km/h) (under steam)
- Armament: 20 × 8-inch (42cwt) muzzle-loading smoothbore cannons on broadside trucks; 1 × 10-inch/68pdr (95cwt) muzzle-loading smoothbore cannons pivot-mounted at bow

HMS Pelorus was a 2,330 ton displacement, 21 gun corvette launched on 5 February 1857 from the Devonport dockyard. It was captained at first by Frederick Beauchamp Paget Seymour, then by Henry Boys, and later William Henry Haswell.

She participated as part of a squadron after the Indian Rebellion of 1857. Then she was sent to the China Station during the Second Opium War until May 1859 when she sailed for Australian Station.

In June 1860, as flagship of the Australian Squadron under Captain Frederick Seymour, she participated in the attack on Puketakauere pā during the First Taranaki War. Later that year, the crew landed at Kairau to support British troops under attack from Maori and in January 1861 a gun crew from the ship helped defend the British redoubt at Huirangi against the Maori. She left the Australia Station in July 1862 for Plymouth.

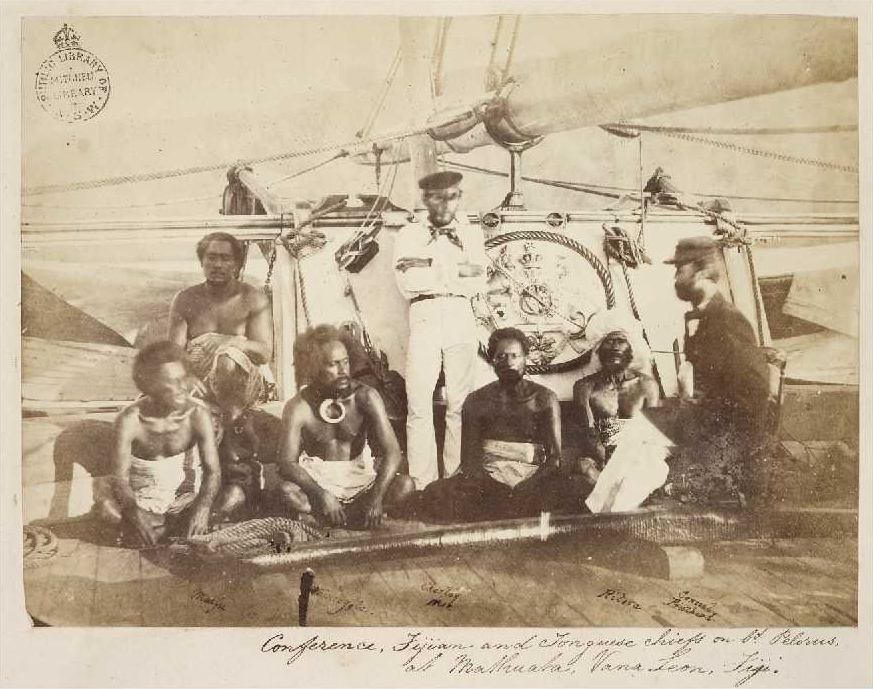
HMS Pelorus, in Macuata waters, during a conference including Enele Maʻafu and William Pritchard, 20 July 1861

The future admiral, Cyprian Bridge served on Pelorus in the East Indies as a midshipman.

She was decommissioned in 1868 and was broken up for scrap in 1869.

Pelorus Island, a tiny island of the Palm Islands group off North Queensland, is said to be named after the ship.
