= William Farquharson Burnett =

Commodore William Farquharson Burnett CB
- Born: 1815; Aberdeen, Scotland
- Died: 7 February 1863 Auckland, New Zealand
- Allegiance: United Kingdom
- Branch: Royal Navy
- Rank: Commodore
- Commands: Australia Station (1862–1863)
- Awards: Companion of the Order of the Bath

Commodore William Farquharson Burnett, CB (1815 – 7 February 1863) was a senior officer in the Royal Navy.

== Naval career ==
Burnett was appointed a lieutenant in the Royal Navy in 1838. Promoted to captain in 1854, he commanded Tortoise at Ascension. He served as Governor of Ascension from 1858 until 1861. He was then the Commander-in-Chief, Australia Station, between 21 July 1862 until 7 February 1863. He drowned when HMS Orpheus was wrecked and sank off the west coast of Auckland, New Zealand, on 7 February 1863.

== See also ==
- O'Byrne, William Richard (1849). "William Farquharson Burnett" . A Naval Biographical Dictionary . John Murray – via Wikisource.

Military offices
| Preceded by Sir Beauchamp Seymour | Commander-in-Chief, Australia Station; 1862–1863 | Succeeded by Sir William Wiseman |
