= Emmanuel Gomez, senior =

Emmanuel Gomez was a Luso-African from Bissau who founded a Luso-African dynasty in Bakia, Guinea in the eighteenth century. He was the father of Emmanuel Gomez, junior and Niara Bely.
