= HMS Amethyst (1844) =

Historic British Navy boat

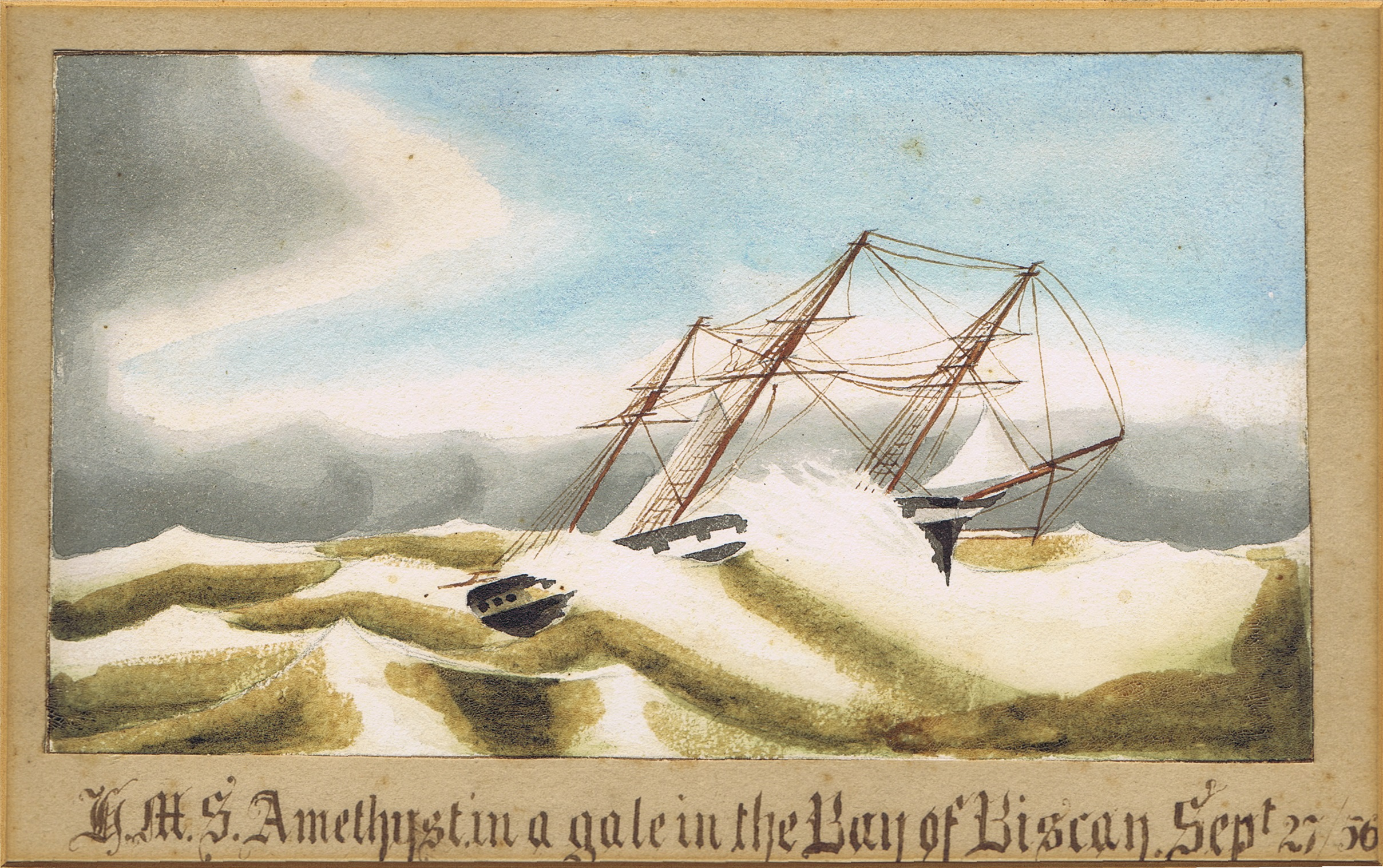
HMS Amethyst, in a gale in the Bay of Biscay, 27 September 1856

HMS Amethyst was a gaff rigged three mast sailing boat. She was a Spartan-class 26-gun sixth rate launched in 1844 and sold in 1869 for use as a cable vessel.

She served in the China War 1856-60 (in the Canton River) and intervened in the Mexican Civil War in 1859 by blockading Mazatlán. This was during a voyage which took her around the world.

Together with HMS Iris she was loaned by the Admiralty to the Atlantic Telegraph Company in 1864, both ships being extensively modified in 1865 for ferrying the Atlantic cable from the manufacturer's works at Enderby's wharf, in East Greenwich, London, to the Great Eastern at her Sheerness mooring.

The cable was coiled down into great cylindrical tanks at the Wharf before being fed into the 'Great Eastern'. The 'Amethyst' and 'Iris' transferred the 2500 miles (4022 km) of cable to the 'Great Eastern', beginning in February 1865, an operation that took over three months.

Both ships were used for the same purpose again in 1866 and again in 1869 by the Telegraph Construction & Maintenance Company (Telcon). As obsolete sailing vessels which had to be towed while ferrying cable, neither ship was capable of independent operation, and both were described as "hulks" in contemporary reports.

The Sail and Steam Navy List notes that according to Admiralty records, HMS Amethyst and HMS Iris were subsequently sold to Telcon when decommissioned on 16 October 1869.

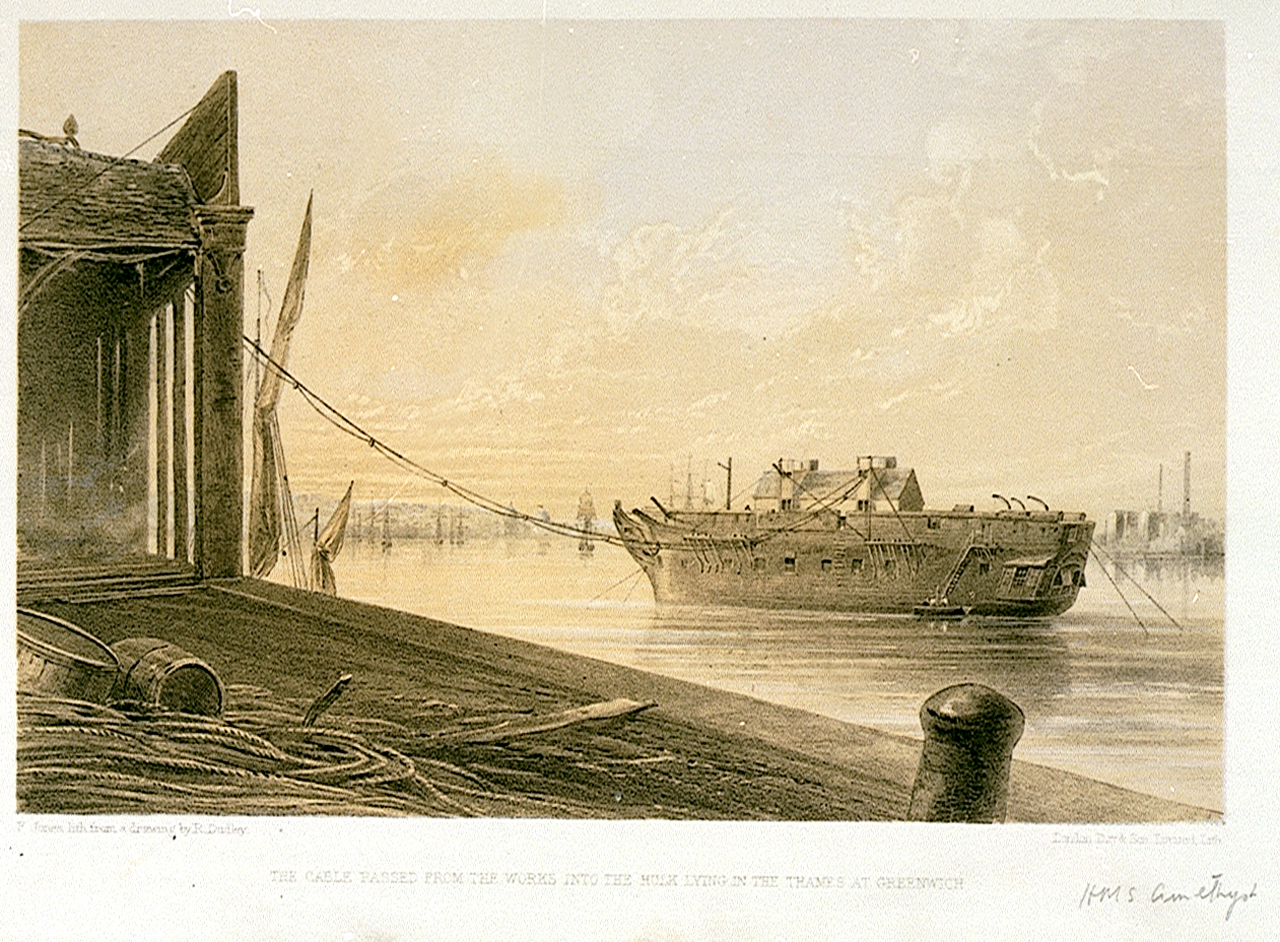
The cable passed from the works into the Amethyst's hulk lying in the Thames at Greenwich
