= HMS Beagle (1872) =

Royal Navy Beagle-class schooner (1872–1883)

History

United Kingdom
- Name: HMS Beagle
- Builder: John Cuthbert, Millers Point, New South Wales
- Launched: December 1872
- Fate: Sold in 1883.

General characteristics
- Type: Beagle-class schooner
- Tons burthen: 120 bm
- Length: 77 ft 0 in (23.5 m)
- Beam: 18 ft 6 in (5.6 m)
- Depth of hold: 8 ft 6 in (2.59 m)
- Sail plan: Schooner
- Complement: 27
- Armament: 1 × 12-pounder gun

HMS Beagle was a schooner of the Royal Navy, built by John Cuthbert, Millers Point, New South Wales and launched in December 1872.

She commenced service on the Australia Station at Sydney in 1873 for anti-blackbirding operations in the South Pacific. In April 1875, she ran aground on a reef in the Spanish East Indies. Her crew were rescued. She was paid off in 1883 and sold for £1,000.

== Fate ==
Beagle was then sold to Messers Bell & Davis, who sailed to Peru after defrauding the Australian Mercantile Loan and Guarantee Company. She was then sold at Callao to Silvino Cavalie.
