= HMS Undine (1881) =

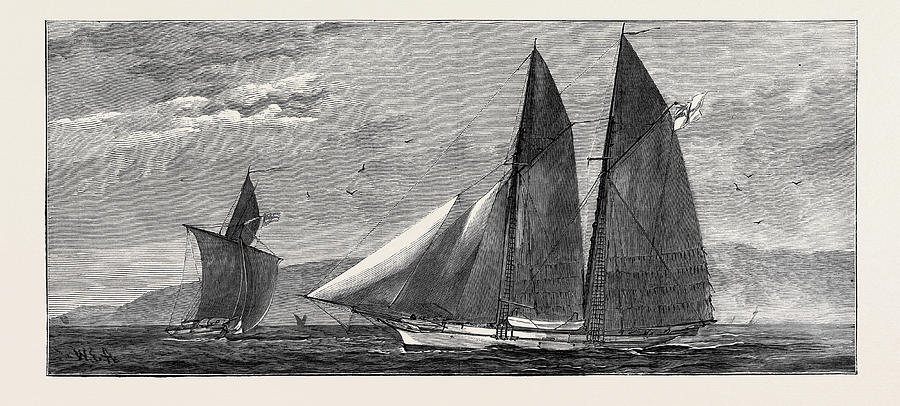
- Undine, was ordered on special service to the coast of Zanzibar, against slavers in 1881

History

United Kingdom
- Name: Morna (1869–1881); Ruby (1889–1890)
- Builder: Camper and Nicholsons, Gosport
- Launched: 1869
- Fate: Lost in King George Sound, Western Australia

United Kingdom
- Name: HMS Undine
- Namesake: Undine
- Fate: Sold 1888

General characteristics
- Type: schooner
- Tonnage: 297 gross register tons

HMS Undine was a schooner gunboat of the Royal Navy. Built as the private yacht Morna by Camper and Nicholsons, Gosport and launched in 1869. The schooner was purchased by the Royal Navy on 15 March 1881 and was renamed Undine.

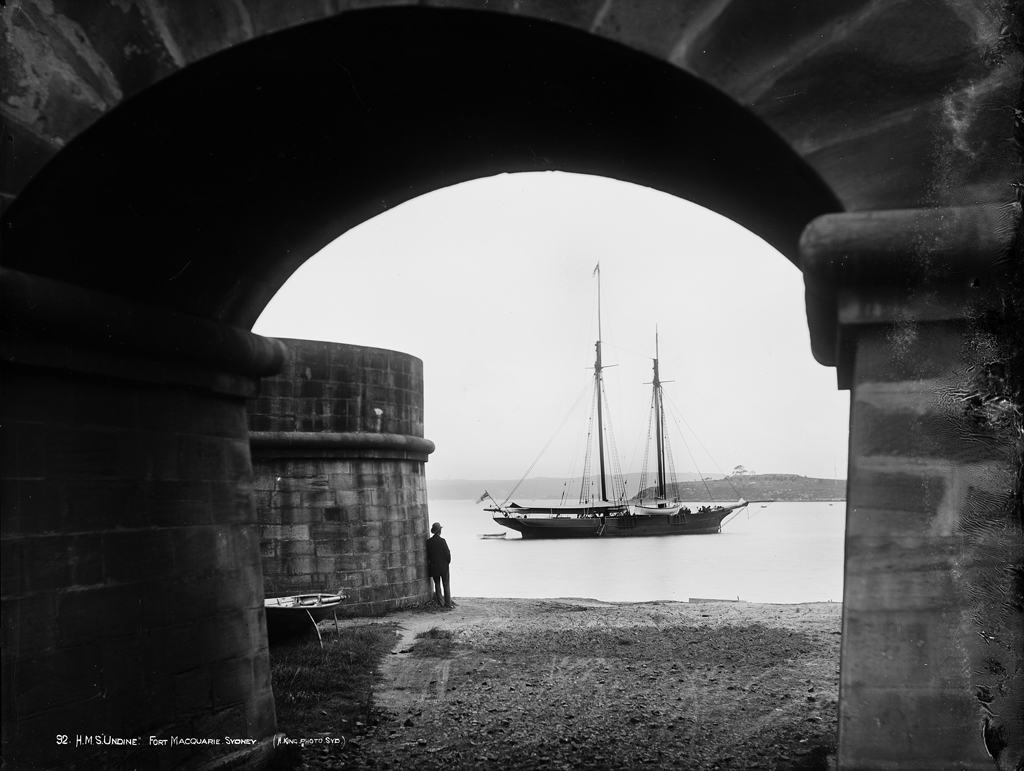
HMS Undine anchored near Fort Macquarie, Sydney

Commenced service on the Australia Station from September 1883 and carried out patrol work and worked as a tender to the flagship HMS Nelson. She was sold in Sydney in April 1888 and was renamed Ruby by her new owners. Ruby was wrecked at Escape Pass in the King George Sound, Western Australia on 25 March 1890.
