= Beauchamp Seymour, 1st Baron Alcester =

Royal Navy Admiral (1821–1895)

Admiral The Right Honourable The Lord Alcester GCB
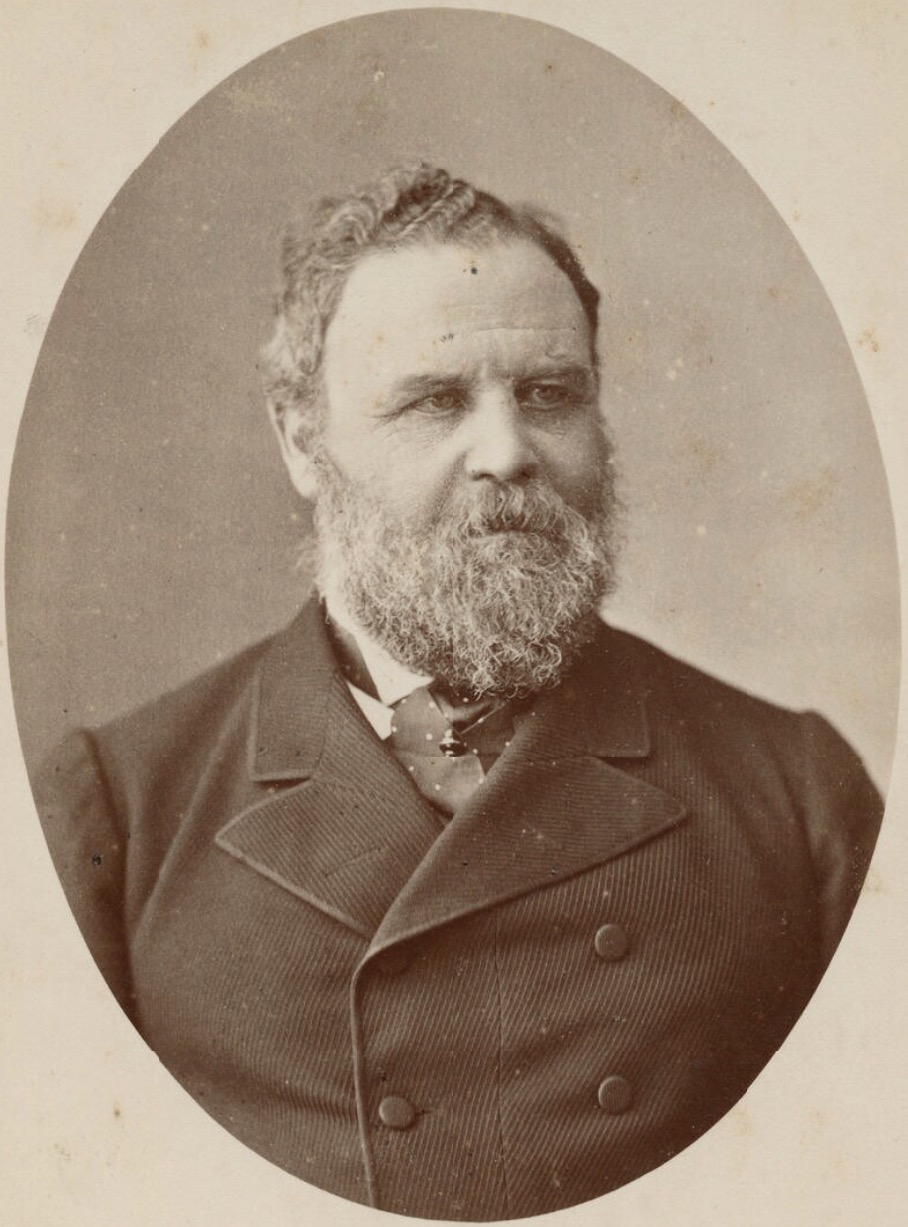
- Lord Alcester in the 1880s
- Born: 12 April 1821; London, England
- Died: 30 March 1895 (aged 73); London, England
- Relatives: Horace Seymour (father)
- Military career
- Allegiance: United Kingdom
- Branch: Royal Navy
- Service years: 1834–1885
- Rank: Admiral
- Nickname: The Ocean Swell
- Commands: HMS Brisk (1853); HMS Meteor (1855–56); Naval Brigade, New Zealand (1860–61); Junior Naval Lord (1872–74); Channel Squadron (1874–77); Mediterranean Fleet (1880–83); Second Naval Lord (1883–85)
- Conflicts: Crimean War (1856); New Zealand Wars (1860–1861); Anglo-Egyptian War (1882)
- Awards: Knight Grand Cross of the Order of the Bath

Admiral Frederick Beauchamp Paget Seymour, 1st Baron Alcester, GCB (12 April 1821 – 30 March 1895) was a Royal Navy officer. He was commander of the Channel Squadron between 1874 and 1877 and Commander-in-Chief of the Mediterranean Fleet between 1880 and 1883.

== Background ==
Seymour was the son of Colonel Sir Horace Seymour and a cousin of the 5th Marquess of Hertford. He was a great-grandson of the 1st Marquess of Hertford.

== Naval career ==
Seymour entered the Royal Navy in 1834, and served in the Mediterranean and the Pacific, and was for three years aide-de-camp to his uncle Sir George Seymour, and was promoted to commander in 1847. He also served in Burma. He was the Commander-in-Chief of the Australia Station from 10 March 1860 and 21 July 1862 as Commodore second class with his pennant aboard Pelorus. He commanded the Naval Brigade in New Zealand during the New Zealand Wars of 1860–61, and was made a Companion of the Order of the Bath (CB) for this.

From 1868 to 1870 Seymour served as private secretary to the First Lord of the Admiralty, Hugh Childers, and was promoted to Rear-Admiral. From 1870 to 1872 he commanded the flying squadron. In 1872, he became Fourth Naval Lord for two years, and then commander of the Channel Squadron. He became a vice-admiral on 31 December 1876, and was appointed KCB in June 1877, and was promoted to GCB on 24 May 1881.

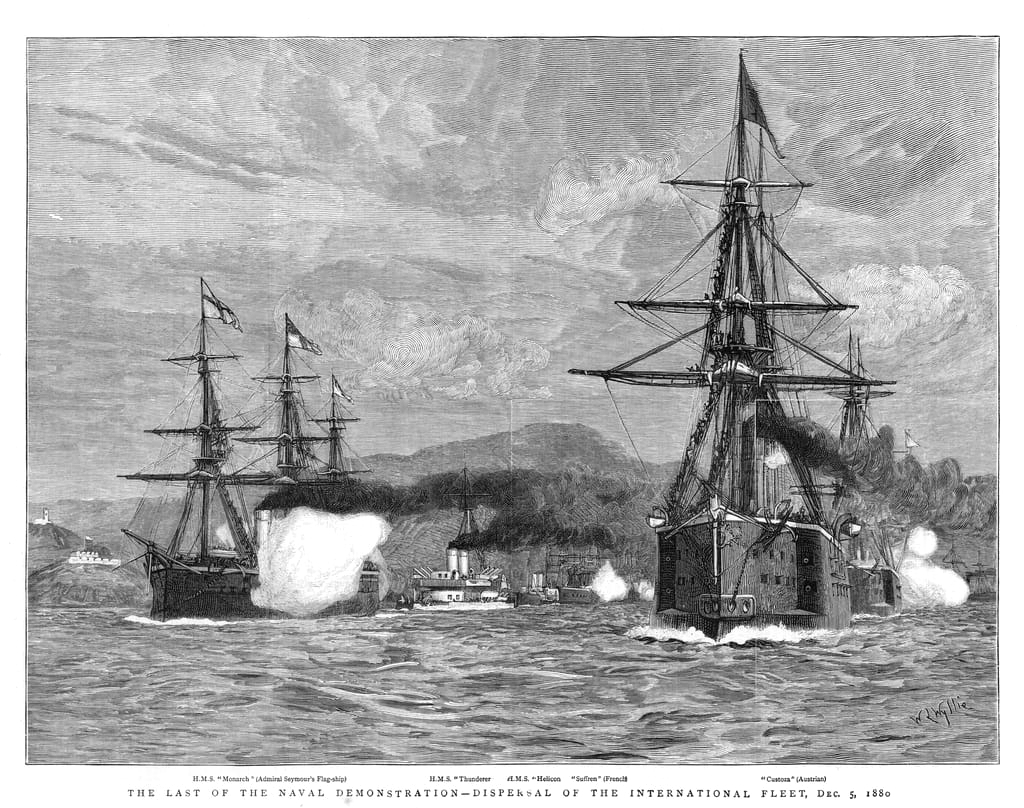
The dispersal of the International Fleet on 5 December 1880 convened for enforcing the Treaty of Berlin. The Graphic 1880

From 1880 to 1883 he was Commander-in-Chief, Mediterranean Fleet, and from 1883 to 1885 he was Second Naval Lord. He became an admiral in May 1882.

He was created Baron Alcester (pronounced "Allster"), of Alcester in the County of Warwick, on 24 November 1882 for his command of the bombardment of Alexandria and in the subsequent operations on the coast of Egypt. He was also honoured with a parliamentary grant of £25,000, the Freedom of the City of London and a Sword of Honour.

== Personal life ==
Lord Alcester never married. He died 30 March 1895, aged 73, when his peerage became extinct.

In his will he left the balance of his estate to Agnes Sinclair for her lifetime. On her death, two fifths were left to Frederick Charles Horace Sinclair and one fifth each to Hugh Francis Paget Sinclair, Claude Sinclair and Evelyn Sinclair.

Coat of arms of Beauchamp Seymour, 1st Baron Alcester

Crest
Out of a ducal coronet Or a phoenix in flames Proper.
Escutcheon
Quarterly, 1st & 4th Or on a pile Gules between six fleur-de-lis Azure three lions passant guardant in pale Or, 2nd & 3rd Gules two wings conjoined in lure Or.
Supporters
Dexter a sailor, sinister a private of the Royal Marines, both habited each holding in the exterior hand a musket and each standing on an Armstrong gun all Proper.
Motto
Foy Pour Devoir

== See also ==
- O'Byrne, William Richard (1849). "Seymour, Frederick Beauchamp Paget" . A Naval Biographical Dictionary . John Murray – via Wikisource.

Military offices
Preceded by William Loring	Commander-in-Chief, Australia Station; 1860–1862	Succeeded by William Burnett
Preceded by Sir John Tarleton	Junior Naval Lord; 1872–1874	Succeeded by Lord Gillford
Preceded by Sir Geoffrey Hornby	Senior Officer in Command of the Channel Squadron; 1874–1877	Succeeded by Lord John Hay
Preceded by Sir Geoffrey Hornby	Commander-in-Chief, Mediterranean Fleet; 1880–1883	Succeeded by Lord John Hay
Preceded by Lord John Hay	Second Naval Lord; 1883–1885	Succeeded by Sir Anthony Hoskins
Peerage of the United Kingdom
New creation	Baron Alcester; 1882–1895	Extinct
