= Sir William Wiseman, 8th Baronet =

British naval officer

Rear-Admiral Sir William Wiseman Bt KCB
- Born: 4 August 1814
- Died: 14 July 1874 (aged 59)
- Allegiance: United Kingdom
- Branch: Royal Navy
- Rank: Rear-Admiral
- Commands: HMS Penelope; Australia Station (1863–1866)
- Conflicts: Waikato Campaign
- Awards: Knight Commander of the Order of the Bath

Rear-Admiral Sir William Saltonstall Wiseman, 8th Baronet, KCB (4 August 1814 – 14 July 1874) was a British naval officer.

== Naval career ==
Born the son of Captain Sir William Saltonstall Wiseman, 7th Baronet, and his wife Catherine Mackintosh, daughter of Sir James Mackintosh, Wiseman entered the Royal Naval College in Portsmouth in 1827. He was made a lieutenant in 1838. In 1854, he was asked to convey Sir Hamilton Seymour, British Ambassador to Russia, to Saint Petersburg. Promoted to captain in 1854, he was given command of HMS Penelope in 1855. He was appointed Commander-in-Chief, Australia Station in 1863 and fought in the Waikato Campaign.

On 14 July 1874, he was found dead in his lodgings in Saint Joseph, Missouri.

== Family ==
On 25 October 1838, he married Charlotte Jane Paterson, daughter of Admiral Charles William Paterson. They had a son and a daughter:

- Rear-Admiral Sir William Wiseman, 9th Baronet (1845–1893), naval officer, whose son was Sir William Wiseman, 10th Baronet, head of Secret Intelligence Service in Washington, DC, during the First World War.
- Eliza who married Admiral H. M. Alexander.

== See also ==
- O'Byrne, William Richard (1849). "Wiseman, William Saltonstall (b)" . A Naval Biographical Dictionary . John Murray – via Wikisource.
- European and American voyages of scientific exploration

Military offices
Preceded by William Burnett	Commander-in-Chief, Australia Station; 1863–1866	Succeeded by Rochfort Maguire
Baronetage of England
Preceded by William Saltonstall Wiseman	Baronet (of Canfield Hall); 1845–1874	Succeeded by William Wiseman
