= Mary Faber de Sanger =

African slave trader (c. 1798–after 1857)

Mary Faber, also called Mary Faber de Sanger (c. 1798 – after 1857), was an African slave-trader. From the 1830s until 1852, she was a dominant figure of the Atlantic slave trade from Guinea, and known for her conflict with the British Royal Navy Anti-Slave Squadron.

== Life ==
Mary Faber was born in Freetown, the daughter of Nova Scotian Settlers. In 1816, she married an American shipowner, Paul Faber (d. 1851), who in 1809 had established himself as a slave trader in the Conakry region.

Her husband established a business base in Sangha at the Rio Pongo River, where the couple had a "slave factory" (slave fortress). This was a slave fortress, in a balance of power with a number of other slave merchants who had slaves in the same region.

Her husband was responsible for the slave ship that transported slaves to Cuba, while Mary Faber was responsible for the operations at the Rio Pongo. As her husband was likely almost constantly absent, she had virtually all the power in the fort, and her husband is not noted to have been involved in business there after the middle of the 1830s.

There were reportedly 6,000 slaves on the Faber property in 1827.

=== Slave trade ===
To avoid the actions of the Royal Navy Anti-Slave Squadron, which made raids and destroyed slave forts after the abolition of the British slave trade, she, like other slave traders, transformed her fort into a plantation, to camouflage the slaves as domestic workers not intended for export.

Through her responsibility for the company's base, Mary Faber was also responsible for the complicated policy of alliances and balance of power with local tribes and other merchant families, as the region was dominated by slave-based free slave traders who were operating in various alliances with local tribes and sometimes involved in conflict and warfare with each other. Mary Faber had her own private army, which she commanded during conflicts. In the years 1838–40, she waged war against her trading rival William Ormond in Bangalan.

Ormond was allied with certain actors in Freetown, which meant that Faber could portray him as a Mulattoo ally and made it possible for her to ally with the Fula tribe, whose chief pulled back his protection from Ormond, which gave Faber the victory and made her the region's premier trader.

In 1842, Mary Faber and her colleague, Bailey Gomez Lightburn, joined their armies to help their allies, the Fula, to plunder the Susu capital, Thia, when weakened by throne fighting, and installing their own candidate there, which benefited Fula, Faber, and Lightburn.

The 1840s are described as a great flowering period for the region's trade. At the same time, like other slave traders, Faber began gradually transferring its interests to peanut and coffee cultivation, although the slave trade continued in parallel.

=== Decline ===
On 17 January 1852, the British and Sierra Leone, in agreement with the domestic ruler, imposed a ban on the slave trade of the region, a ban which the lower river region had already adopted. Mary Faber, who perceived the treaty as a hostile act from the lower river trader in alliance with Freetown's "mulatto" and also as a way of releasing the lower river's Susa tribe from her allied Fula tribe power, which would hurt her business, closed alliance with her colleagues Lightburn and Charles Wilkinson and ravaged the Susu region by the lower river. The war ended with a defeat for Faber and her allies (1855), and her slave fort was burned down. The Faber family rebuilt their fort and continued business.

In 1852, Mary Faber handed over the company to her son William Faber, who continued the slave trade until at least 1860. Mary Faber was last mentioned by missionaries in 1857, then only in the role of family matriarch and mother of William Faber.

== See also ==
- Signares, female slave traders in colonial West Africa

== Bibliography ==
- Mouser, Bruce L. Women Traders and Big-Men of Guinea-Conakry 17 October 1980
- Sarah Shaver Hughes, Brady Hughes, Women in World History: v. 2: Readings from 1500 to the Present, Volym 2
- Boubacar Barry, Senegambia and the Atlantic Slave Trade
- Christine Fauré, Political and Historical Encyclopedia of Women
