= HMS Emerald (1876) =

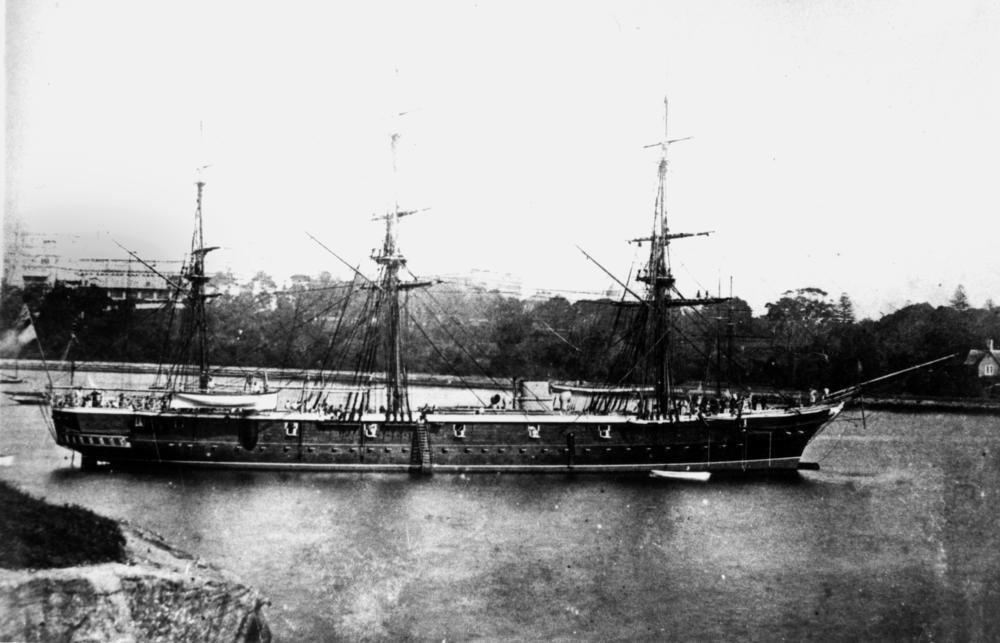

History

United Kingdom
- Name: HMS Emerald
- Builder: Pembroke Dockyard
- Launched: 18 August 1876
- Fate: Sold on 10 July 1906 to Cox, Falmouth.

General characteristics
- Class & type: Emerald-class corvette
- Displacement: 2,120 long tons (2,150 t)
- Tons burthen: 1,864 bm
- Length: 220 ft (67.1 m) (p/p)
- Beam: 40 ft (12.2 m)
- Draught: 18 ft (5.5 m)
- Installed power: 2,031–2,364 ihp (1,515–1,763 kW)
- Propulsion: 1 shaft; 1 × 2-cylinder compound-expansion steam engine; 6 cylindrical boilers
- Sail plan: Full-rigged ship
- Speed: 12–13 knots (22–24 km/h; 14–15 mph)
- Range: 2,000–2,280 nmi (3,700–4,220 km; 2,300–2,620 mi) at 10 knots (19 km/h; 12 mph)
- Complement: 230
- Armament: 10 × 64-pounder 71-cwt rifled muzzle-loading (RML) guns; 2 × 64-pounder 64-cwt RML guns

HMS Emerald was an Emerald-class corvette, of the Royal Navy, built at the Pembroke Dockyard and launched on 18 August 1876.

== Service history ==
She commenced service on the Australia Station in September 1878. She escorted Sir Hercules Robinson, the Governor of New Zealand from Sydney to Auckland in May 1879. Emerald was sent on a punitive mission in the Solomon Islands in 1879 after the captain and three crew of HMS Sandfly were killed by natives.

Emerald, under Captain William Maxwell, visited the Ellice Islands in 1881. She left the Australia Station in October 1881 and returned to England.

Emerald was refitted and rearmed in 1882 in England and placed into reserve. She commissioned for the North America and West Indies Station in 1886, before returning to England in 1892 and again being placed into reserve. She was converted into a powder hulk in 1895 at Portsmouth.

=== Fate ===
She was sold on 10 July 1906 to Cox, Falmouth.
