= Rochfort Maguire =

Irish Royal Navy commodore

Captain Rochfort Maguire
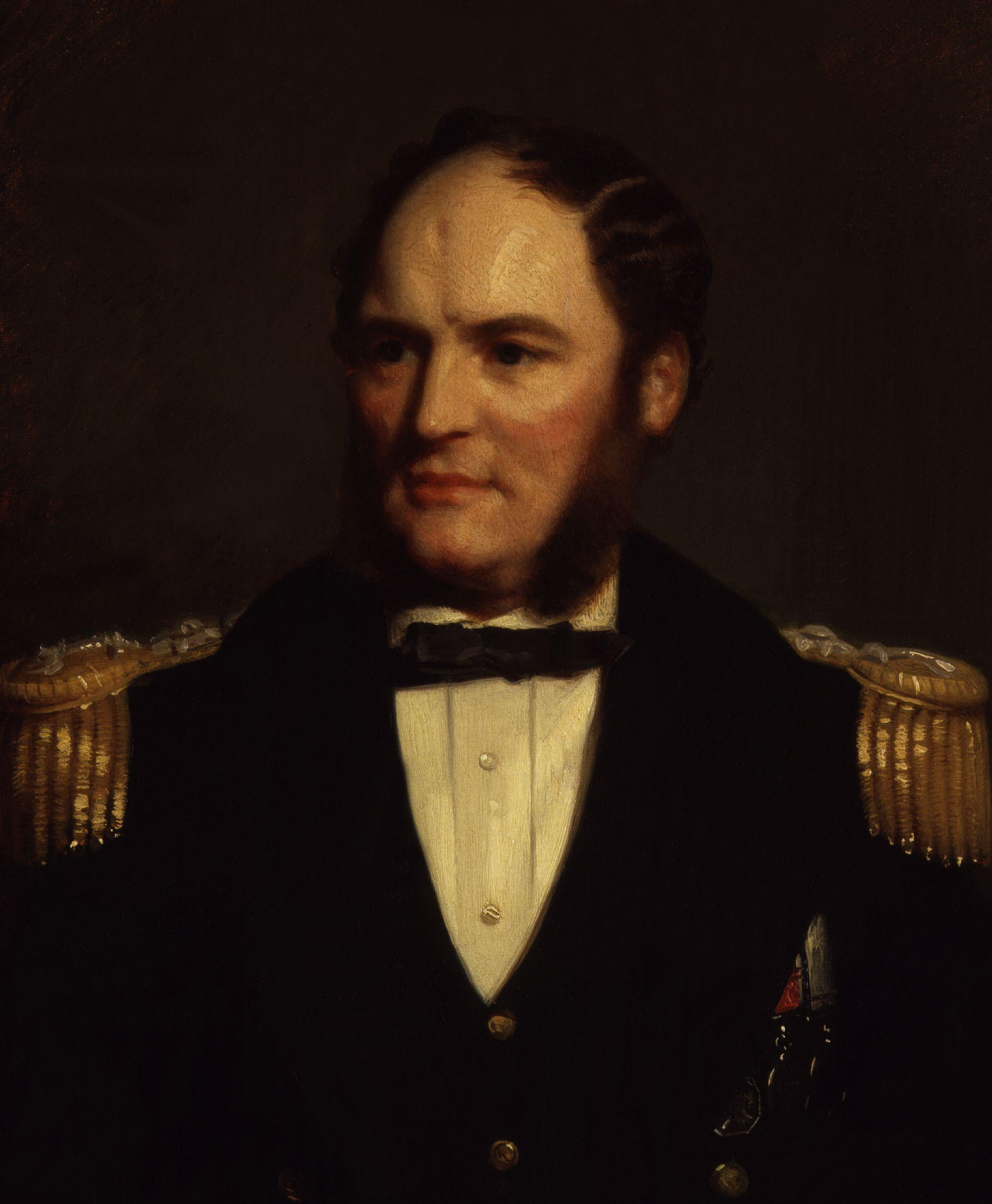
- Portrait by Stephen Pearce

Commander-in-Chief, Australia Station
- In office 23 May 1866 – 28 May 1867
- Preceded by: Sir William Wiseman
- Succeeded by: Rowley Lambert

Personal details
- Born: 18 June 1815 County Westmeath, Ireland
- Died: 29 June 1867 (aged 52) Gosport, Hampshire, England
- Awards: Arctic Medal, 1818–55

Military service
- Branch: Royal Navy
- Service years: 1830–1867
- Rank: Commodore
- Conflict: Oriental Crisis of 1840

Rochfort Maguire (18 June 1815 – 29 June 1867) was an Irish Royal Navy officer who served as captain of HMS Plover from 1852 to 1853 during the Franklin search expedition.

== Career ==
=== Royal Navy ===
Maguire joined the Royal Navy in 1830. He came to notice when he was wounded in action in 1840 at Sidon whilst serving on HMS Wasp under Sir Charles Napier. He was mentioned in despatches and as a result he was promoted to lieutenant on HMS Vernon in the Mediterranean.

=== Search for Franklin ===
Maguire was assigned to the Franklin search expedition in 1848. They sailed out of Plymouth on a mission to find the lost remains of John Franklin's ill-fated Northwest Passage expedition of 1845. Maguire was made captain of HMS Plover from 1852 to 1854.

== Later life ==
Promoted to captain in 1855, he was given command of HMS Sans Pareil, HMS Imperieuse, HMS Chesapeake, and then HMS Galatea.

He became commander-in-chief of Australian Station on 23 May 1866, before he was invalidated out on 28 May 1867. He died a month later, on 29 June, at Royal Hospital Haslar.
