= Lord Charles Montagu-Douglas-Scott =

Royal Navy Admiral (1839–1911)

Admiral Lord Charles Montagu Douglas Scott GCB
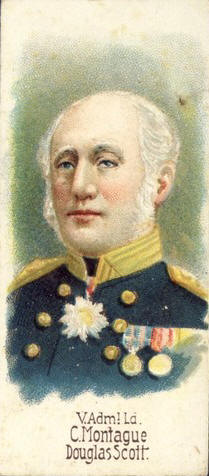
- Born: 20 October 1839
- Died: 21 August 1911 (aged 71)
- Military career
- Allegiance: United Kingdom
- Branch: Royal Navy
- Service years: 1853–1904
- Rank: Admiral
- Commands: HMS Narcissus; HMS Bacchante; HMS Agincourt; Australia Station; Plymouth Command
- Conflicts: Crimean War; Second Opium War
- Awards: Knight Grand Cross of the Order of the Bath

Admiral Lord Charles Thomas Montagu-Douglas-Scott, GCB (20 October 1839 – 21 August 1911) was a Royal Navy officer who served as Commander-in-Chief, Plymouth.

== Naval career ==
Born the fourth son of Walter Montagu-Douglas-Scott, 5th Duke of Buccleuch, Charles Montagu-Douglas-Scott was educated at Radley College and joined the Royal Navy in 1853. He saw service in the Black Sea in 1855 during the Crimean War. He also took part in the Battle of Fatshan Creek in 1857 during the Second Opium War and served with the Naval Brigade during the Indian Mutiny of 1857.

He was given command of HMS Narcissus in 1875, HMS Bacchante in 1879 and HMS Agincourt in 1885. In 1887 became he became Captain of Chatham Dockyard and then from 1889 to 1892 he was Commander of the Australia Station. His last appointment was as Commander-in-Chief, Plymouth, where his flag was hoisted on the port guard ship HMS Nile on 28 March 1900, and he himself took up position the following month. He left Plymouth in 1902, and retired from the navy in 1904.

He was advanced to a Knight Grand Cross of the Order of the Bath (GCB) in the November 1902 Birthday Honours list, and invested with the insignia by King Edward VII at Buckingham Palace on 18 December 1902.

He lived at Boughton House near Kettering in Northamptonshire.

== Family ==
In 1883 he married Ada Mary Ryan, the sister of Australian artist Ellis Rowan and military surgeon Charles Ryan; they went on to have two sons.

Military offices
Preceded by Henry Fairfax	Commander-in-Chief, Australia Station; 1889–1892	Succeeded by Nathaniel Bowden-Smith
Preceded by Sir Henry Fairfax	Commander-in-Chief, Plymouth; 1900–1902	Succeeded by Sir Lewis Beaumont
