= William Loring (Royal Navy officer) =

Royal Navy Admiral (1811–1895)

Admiral Sir William Loring KCB
- Born: 31 October 1811
- Died: 4 January 1895 (aged 83) Ryde, Isle of Wight
- Allegiance: United Kingdom
- Branch: Royal Navy
- Rank: Admiral
- Commands: Australia Station (1860–1862)
- Awards: Knight Commander of the Order of the Bath

Admiral Sir William Loring KCB (31 October 1811 – 4 January 1895) was a senior officer in the Royal Navy. He was the first Commander-in-Chief of the Australia Station from 26 March 1859 until 10 March 1860. He was also the Rear-Admiral Superintendent of Portsmouth Dockyard between 1870 and 1871.

== Naval career ==
Born on 31 October 1811, the son of Admiral Sir John Wentworth Loring. He attended school at Twyford School, Hampshire, before joining the Royal Navy in July 1826.

He was promoted to Lieutenant on 26 February 1836, and Commander on 27 August 1841. He served as Commander on HMS Scout on the East Indies Station in 1846. Promoted to Captain on 31 January 1848, he later received command of HMS Furious in 1852 on the Mediterranean Station and in 1854 participated in the Black Sea during the Crimean War. Later serving aboard HMS Iris on the East Indies Station from 24 December 1856, he was later appointed the first Commander-in-Chief of the Australia Station from 26 March 1859 until 10 March 1860, as a Commodore second class, with his pennant aboard Iris. He participated in the attack on Puketakauere pā during the First Taranaki War in New Zealand.

Between 1862 and 1866 he commanded HMS Saturn, before being appointed Rear Admiral on 7 March 1866. He was the Rear-Admiral Superintendent of Portsmouth Dockyard between 1870 and 1871. He was later appointed Vice Admiral on 2 November 1871 and then Admiral on 1 August 1877. He retired on 23 November 1881.

== Personal life ==
29 Aug 1865 at Pembroke St Mary, William Loring of full age a bach and Captain Royal Navy superintendent at the Royal Dockyard Pembroke Dock the son of Admiral Sir John Wentworth Loring KCB KCH married Frances Louisa Adams of full age a spinster of Holyland Pembroke St Michael the daughter of John Adams Esquire Gentleman by licence in front of J.H. Philips Vicar of Haverfordwest St Mary. Both signed their names in the presence of Agnes Adams and John Adams

His eldest son Frederick George Loring (1869–1951) F. G. Loring was an English naval officer and writer, and an early expert in wireless telegraphy.

== Death ==
Admiral Loring died on 4 January 1895 at Ryde on the Isle of Wight, England.

== See also ==
- O'Byrne, William Richard (1849). "Loring, William" . A Naval Biographical Dictionary . John Murray – via Wikisource.
- Bastock, John (1988), Ships on the Australia Station, Child & Associates Publishing Pty Ltd; Frenchs Forest, Australia. ISBN 0-86777-348-0

Military offices
| Preceded by New Creation | Commander-in-Chief, Australia Station; 1859–1860 | Succeeded by Frederick Seymour |
