= HMS Harrier (1881) =

Royal Navy ship

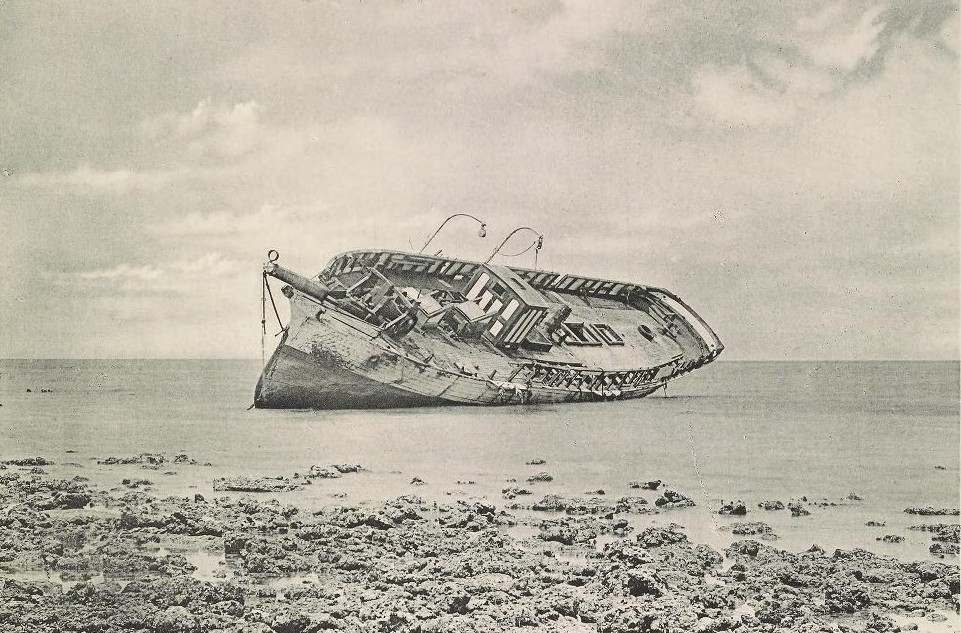
- Wreck of Harrier

History

United Kingdom
- Name: Harrier
- Builder: Cowes, Isle of Wight
- Launched: 1872
- Fate: Wrecked July 1891

United Kingdom
- Name: HMS Harrier
- Acquired: 15 March 1881
- Fate: Sold April 1888

General characteristics
- Type: schooner

HMS Harrier was a schooner of the Royal Navy. Built at Cowes, Isle of Wight and launched in 1872. She was bought by the Royal Navy for £2874 and named HMS Harrier.

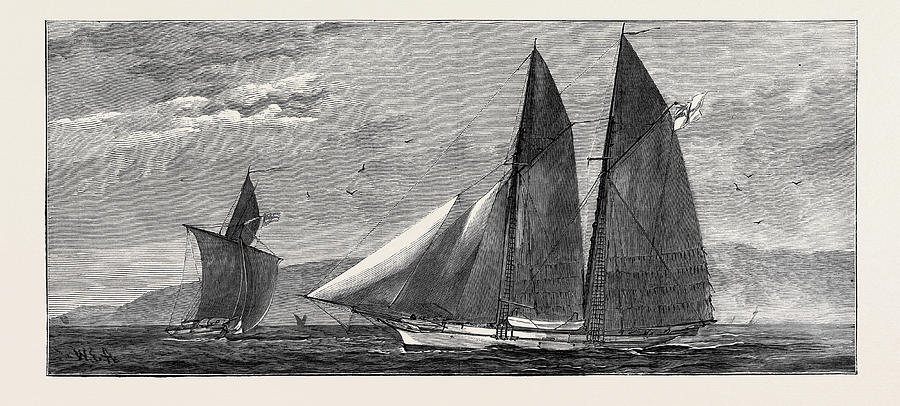
Harrier far left, was ordered on special service to the coast of Zanzibar, against slavers in 1881

Initially in use for policing the East Africa slave trade, she commenced service on the Australia Station in September 1883. Undertaking some survey work, she was paid off in 1888 and she was sold in Sydney to the London Missionary Society for £1200.

Harrier was wrecked upon F Reef, Great Barrier Reef, near Cooktown in July 1891.
