= HMS Gloucester (1812) =

Vengeur-class ship of the line

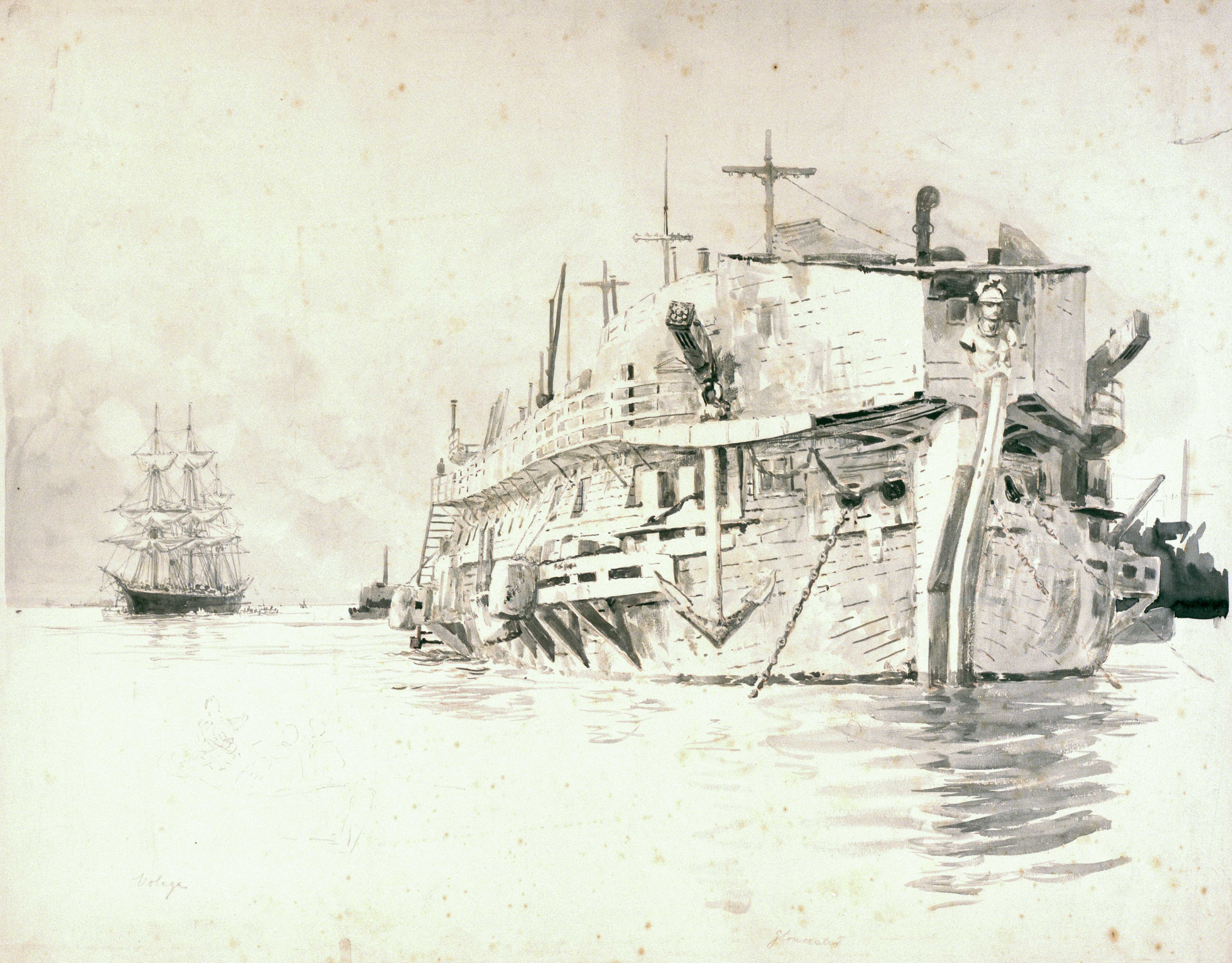
- The hulk Gloucester and HMS Volage at Chatham, sometime from 1861 to 1884

History

United Kingdom
- Name: HMS Gloucester
- Ordered: 11 June 1808
- Builder: Pitcher, Northfleet
- Launched: 27 February 1812
- Fate: Sold, 1884

General characteristics
- Class & type: Vengeur-class ship of the line
- Tons burthen: 1770 6/94 bm
- Length: 176 ft 3.5 in (53.7 m) (Gundeck)
- Beam: 47 ft 10.5 in (14.6 m)
- Draught: 17 feet 5.5 inches (5.3 m) (deep load)
- Depth of hold: 21 ft (6.4 m)
- Sail plan: Full-rigged ship
- Armament: 74 guns: Gundeck: 28 × 32-pdr cannon; Upper gundeck: 28 × 18-pdr cannon; Quarterdeck: 4 × 12-pdr cannon, 10 × 32-pdr carronades; Forecastle: 2 × 12-pdr cannon, 2 × 32-pdr carronades; Poop deck: 6 × 18-pdr carronades

HMS Gloucester was a 74-gun, third rate Vengeur-class ship of the line built for the Royal Navy in the 1810s. She played a minor role in the Napoleonic Wars and was cut down into a 50-gun fourth rate frigate in 1831–1832. The ship was converted into a receiving ship and broken up in 1884.

== Description ==
Gloucester had a length at the gundeck of 176 feet 3.5 inches (53.7 m) and 145 feet 2 inches (44.2 m) at the keel. She had a beam of 47 feet 10.5 inches (14.6 m), a draught of 17 feet 5.5 inches (5.3 m) at deep load, and a depth of hold of 21 feet (6.4 m). The ship's tonnage was 1770 6/94 tons burthen. Gloucester was armed with twenty-eight 32-pounder cannon on her main gundeck, twenty-eight 18-pounder cannon on her upper gundeck, four 12-pounder cannon and ten 32-pounder carronades the quarterdeck, two more pairs of 12-pounder guns and 32-pounder carronades on the forecastle, and six 18-pounder carronades on the poop deck. The ship had a crew of 590 officers and ratings.

== Construction and career ==
Gloucester, named after the eponymous port, was the eighth ship of her name to serve in the Royal Navy. She was ordered on 11 June 1808 from Thomas Pitcher and was laid down at his Northfleet dockyard in March 1808, launched on 27 February 1812 and was towed to Sheerness where the ship was completed on 11 June. Gloucester cost £62,519 to build and an additional £25,343 to outfit. The ship was commissioned in April 1813 under the command of Captain Robert Williams for duty in the North Sea and then the Baltic Sea.

She was reduced to a 50-gun ship in 1831–32, and was sold for scrap in May 1884.
