= Farenya =

Farenya Faringhia, Faringuia, Farringhia, Farénya, Foringuia
- populated settlement
- Location in Guinea
- Coordinates: 10°16′N 13°58′W
- Country: Guinea
- Region: Boké Region
- Prefecture: Boffa Prefecture
- Farenya: 1809
- Elevation: 177 ft (54 m)
- Time zone: UTC+0 (GMT)

Farenya is a settlement in Boffa Prefecture, Boké Region, Guinea. It is situated 69 miles (or 111 km) north of Conakry. It is located on the Pongo River.

== History ==
Farenya was founded by Stiles Edward Lightbourn, a slave trader from South Carolina and his Luso-African wife Niara Bely. They had originally lived in nearby Bangalan and established Farenya in 1809.

=== British raid in 1841 ===
The location was used to warehouse a variety of goods. In 1841 some boats of war from the corvette HMS Iris part of the British West Africa Squadron, raided Farenya burning the warehouses and the goods located inside them.
