= HMS Volage (1869) =

- Circa 1892 photograph of HMS Volage, lead ship of the class

History

United Kingdom
- Name: HMS Volage
- Builder: Thames Ironworks and Shipbuilding Company, Blackwall, London
- Cost: £126,156
- Laid down: September 1867
- Launched: 27 February 1869
- Commissioned: March 1870
- Decommissioned: 1899
- Nickname(s): Vollidge
- Fate: Sold for scrap, 17 May 1904

General characteristics (as built)
- Class & type: Volage-class iron screw corvette
- Displacement: 3,078 long tons (3,127 t)
- Tons burthen: 2,322 bm
- Length: 270 ft (82.3 m) (p/p)
- Beam: 42 ft 1 in (12.8 m)
- Draught: 21 ft 5 in (6.5 m)
- Installed power: 4,130 ihp (3,080 kW)
- Propulsion: 1 × shaft; 1 × 2-cylinder horizontal return connecting rod-steam engine; 5 × rectangular boilers
- Sail plan: Ship rig
- Speed: 15 knots (28 km/h; 17 mph)
- Range: 2,000 nmi (3,700 km; 2,300 mi) at 10 knots (19 km/h; 12 mph)
- Complement: 340
- Armament: 6 × 7-inch rifled muzzle-loading guns; 4 × 6.3-inch 64-pounder rifled muzzle-loading guns

HMS Volage was a Volage-class corvette built for the Royal Navy in the late 1860s. She spent most of her first commission assigned to the Flying Squadron circumnavigating the world, and later carried a party of astronomers to the Kerguelen Islands to observe the transit of Venus in 1874. The ship was then assigned as the senior officer's ship in South American waters until she was transferred to the Training Squadron during the 1880s. Volage was paid off in 1899 and sold for scrap in 1904.

== Description ==
Volage was 270 feet (82.3 m) long between perpendiculars and had a beam of 42 feet 1 inch (12.8 m). Forward the ship had a draught of 16 feet 5 inches (5.0 m), but aft she drew 21 ft 5 in (6.5 m). Volage displaced 3,078 long tons (3,127 t) and had a burthen of 2,322 tons. Her iron hull was covered by a 3-inch (76 mm) layer of oak that was sheathed with copper from the waterline down to prevent biofouling. Watertight transverse bulkheads subdivided the hull. Her crew consisted of 340 officers and ratings. The ship was nicknamed Vollidge by her crew.

The ship had one 2-cylinder trunk engine made by John Penn & Sons driving a single 19-foot (5.8 m) propeller. Five rectangular boilers provided steam to the engine at a working pressure of 30 psi (207 kPa; 2 kgf/cm^{2}). The engine produced a total of 4,530 indicated horsepower (3,380 kW) which gave Volage a maximum speed of 15.3 knots (28.3 km/h; 17.6 mph). The ship carried 420 long tons (430 t) of coal, enough to steam 1,850 nautical miles (3,430 km; 2,130 mi) at 10 knots (19 km/h; 12 mph). Volage was ship rigged and had a sail area of 16,593 square feet (1,542 m^{2}). The lower masts were made of iron, but the other masts were wood. The ship's best speed under sail alone was 13 knots (24 km/h; 15 mph). Her funnel was semi-retractable to reduce wind resistance and her propeller could be hoisted up into the stern of the ship to reduce drag while under sail.

The ship was initially armed with a mix of 7-inch and 64-pounder 64 cwt (Note: "cwt" is the abbreviation for hundredweight, 64 cwt referring to the weight of the gun.) rifled muzzle-loading guns. The six 7-inch (178 mm) guns and two of the four 64-pounders were mounted on the broadside while the other two were mounted on the forecastle and poop deck as chase guns. The 7-inch guns were replaced in 1873 and the ship was rearmed with a total of eighteen 64-pounders. In 1880, ten BL 6-inch 80-pounder breech-loading guns replaced all the broadside weapons. Two carriages for 14-inch (356 mm) torpedoes were added as well.

== Service ==
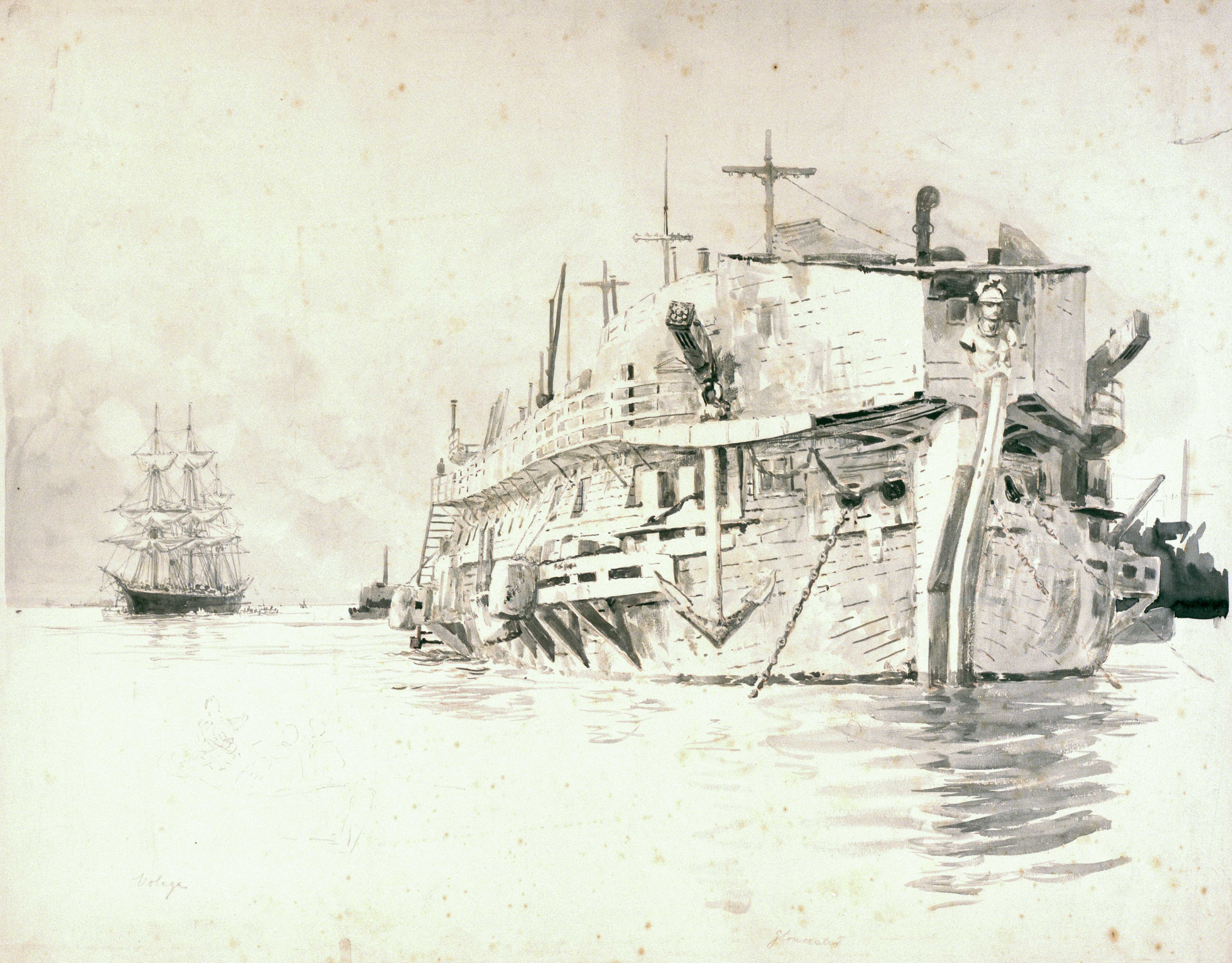
The hulk 'Gloucester' and HMS 'Volage' at Chatham, sometime from 1871 to 1884

HMS Volage was laid down in September 1867 and launched on 27 February 1869. The ship was completed in March 1870 at a total cost of £132,817. Of this, £91,817 was spent on her hull and £41,000 on her machinery. Volage was initially assigned to the Channel Fleet under the command of Captain Sir Michael Culme-Seymour, Bt. However, by the end of 1870, she was transferred to the Flying Squadron which circumnavigated the world. The ship returned to England at the end of 1872 and was given a lengthy refit. Volage recommissioned in 1874 to ferry an expedition of astronomers to the Kerguelen Islands to observe the transit of Venus. She grounded on an uncharted shoal there without damage. The following year, the ship was assigned as the senior officer's ship for the South American side of the South Atlantic. Volage was ordered home in 1879 where she was refitted, rearmed and her boilers were replaced. The ship was assigned to the Training Squadron in the 1880s until it was disbanded in 1899. Volage was then paid off and sold for scrap on 17 May 1904.

== Bibliography ==
- Ballard, G. A. (1937). "British Corvettes of 1875: The Volage, Active and Rover". Mariner's Mirror. 23 (January). Cambridge, UK: Society for Nautical Research: 53–67.
- Lyon, David & Winfield, Rif (2004). The Sail and Steam Navy List: All the Ships of the Royal Navy 1815–1889. Chatham Publishing. ISBN 978-1-86176-032-6. OCLC 52620555.
- "Journal of the Volage" Ms. Acland d.196, Special Collections, Weston Library, University of Oxford
