= James Paterson Bower =

Royal Navy officer

- Born: February 16, 1806; Inverarity
- Died: August 7, 1889 (aged 83)
- Burial place: Dean Cemetery
- Spouse: Barbara Hickson
- Children: 2
- Relatives: Graham Bower
- Military career
- Allegiance: British
- Branch: Royal Navy
- Rank: Admiral
- Commands: HMS Hecate
- Conflicts: First Opium War

Admiral James Paterson Bower (1806–1889) was a Royal Navy officer in the mid-19th century.

== Life ==
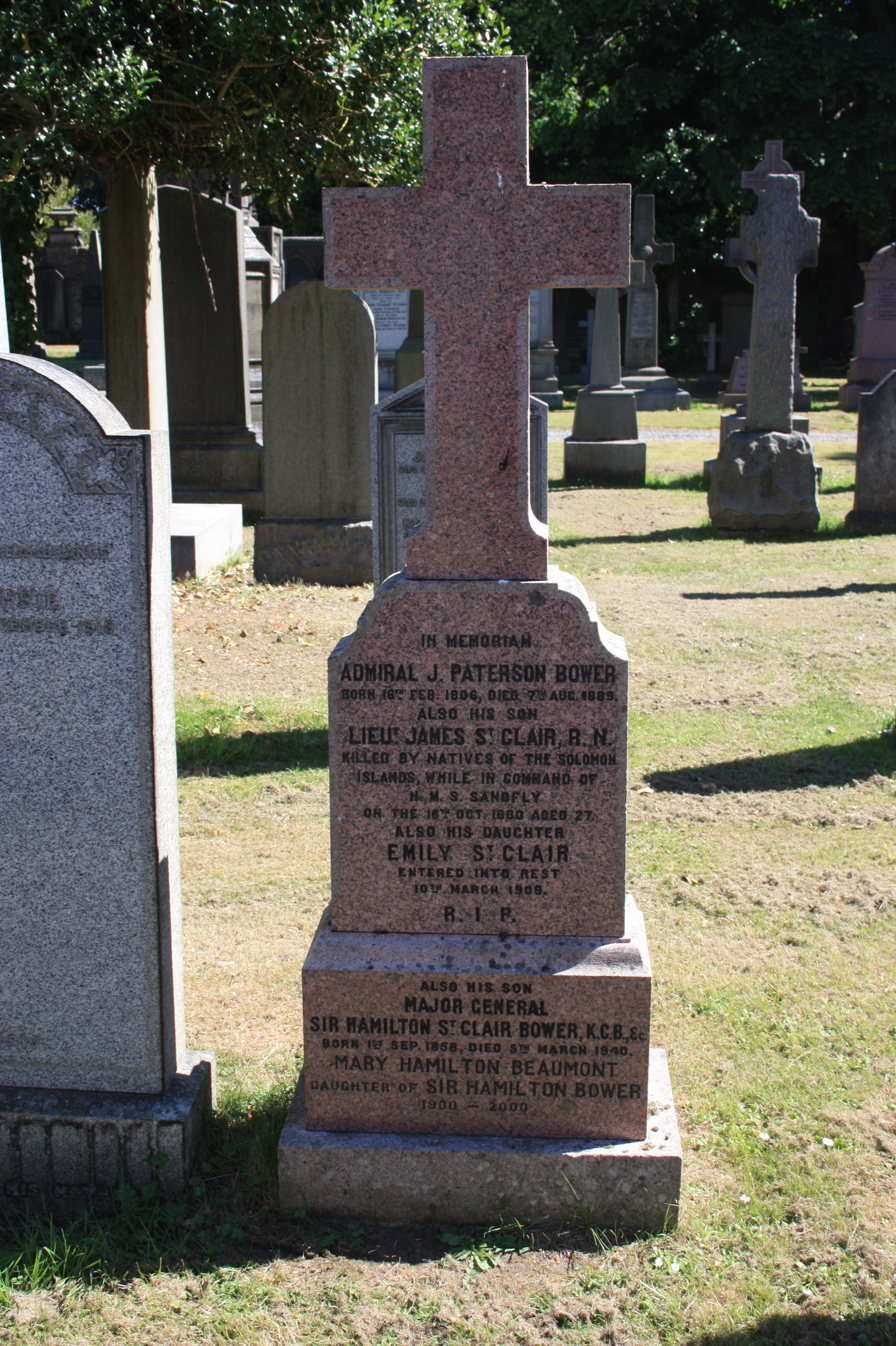
The grave of Major General Hamilton Bower, Dean Cemetery

He was born on 16 February 1806 at Inverarity in Forfarshire. He was the son of Graham Bower (d.1844) of Meathie, Kinnettles and Kincaldrum. They were descended from Margaret St Clair of Roslin. His father was forced to sell most of the family estates in 1817 to settle family debts. Following this the family moved to Woodburn House near Ceres in Fife, previously the home of Dalgleish of Scotscraig.

James entered the Royal Navy aged 14 on 6 May 1820. He passed the exam as a lieutenant in 1826.

His first commission was in 1837 as a lieutenant on first HMS Dublin then HMS President, both off the coast of South America, under Rear Admiral Graham Eden Hamond and Charles Bayne Hodgson Ross.

In July 1838 he was appointed to HMS Samarang under Captain William Broughton and saw action in China in the First Opium War. This included the capture of the fort on the island of Tycocktow in January 1841. He fought bravely in this action but received a deep sabre cut on his knee. Not long after, he captured a battery of 20 cannon at Anunghoy. In March 1841 he distinguished himself at the battle of Feeshukok, capturing seven cannon. In these actions the Samarang was accompanied by HMS Nemesis in the movement from Macao to Whampoa, known as the Pearl River delta. In this action they captured or destroyed five forts, one battery, two military stations and nine Chinese men-of-war, the latter totalling 115 guns. His actions were critical to the later Treaty of Whampoa.

He was promoted to captain on 6 May 1843 and in December 1843 was given command of HMS Hecate.

His most unusual duty in later life was the escorting of the body of Admiral Philip Durham from Malta to Britain in April 1845. He was promoted to admiral later in 1845. However, he was placed on half pay soon after. He formally retired in 1863.

He appears in Edinburgh prior to 1875 living at "Merleton": a villa on Boswell Road in the Granton district. He left Edinburgh for a few years around 1880.

He returned to Edinburgh prior to 1875, living at 4 Moredun Crescent from then until death.

He died on 7 August 1889 and is buried in Dean Cemetery. The grave lies in the northern extension attaching the original cemetery and faces the main east–west path.

== Family ==
He married Barbara Hickson (1828–1922) of Ireland, daughter of John Richard Hickson, sometime prior to 1851.

In 1858 his family was at Portsea Island, Hampshire, when his son Hamilton Bower was born.

His eldest son James St Clair Bower was killed (with five others) on the Solomon Islands whilst ashore from HMS Sandfly in October 1880, aged 27. His daughter Barbara St Clair Bower was one of the first students of Somerville College, Oxford and lived until 1957.

His older brother Alexander Bower was declared legal descendant of William St Clair of Roslin and awarded a coat of arms in recognition.

== Trivia ==
Merleton was briefly a children's home after Bower left, but it closed in 1886.
