= Niara Bely =

Luso-African queen

- Born: c. 1790
- Died: 14 April 1879
- Other name: Elizabeth Bailey Gomez
- Citizenship: Luso-African
- Occupations: Queen, businesswoman and slave trader
- Known for: Prominent businesswoman in 19th-century Guinea
- Notable work: Trading settlement in Farenya, Guinea
- Spouse: Stiles Edward Lightbourn

Niara Bely (c. 1790 – 1879), also known as Elizabeth Bailey Gomez, was a Luso-African queen who became a prominent businesswoman in nineteenth century Guinea. She was active in the slave trade in Farenya, Guinea.

== Biography ==
Niara Bely was the daughter of Emmanuel Gomez, the Luso-African ruler of Bakia, Guinea. She studied in Liverpool. At some point, she also adopted the westernised name of Elizabeth Bailey Gomez.

=== Slave trader ===
In 1809, she married the slave trader Stiles Edward Lightbourn who spent much of his time on voyages across the Atlantic. The couple originally lived in Bangalan. Bely subsequently maintained a trading settlement located in Farenya, Guinea. While there, she became a prominent businesswoman involved in the slave trade. She resided in the fortified settlement, in a two-storey building she described as a "palace". Archaeological evidence suggests that the area became a village only after Bely set up her trading outpost. It was the destination for trading routes from the Fouta Djallon highlands.

=== Chief ===
Lightbourn was lost at sea in 1833. Two years later both Bely and her son Stiles Jr were made chiefs. Over the course of the following 30 years, the family would fight for control of the local area. The children of Bely and Lightbourn did not reside in Farenya, but instead at Gnanya, which at the time was the port for the region.

In 1841, when Benjamin Campbell was investigated for involvement in the slave trade, he freely admitted that he had done business with "Mrs Lightbourn", but said that he had only bought legitimate goods such as ivory, hides, wax, gold and coffee.

In 1842, Niara Bely and her colleague Mary Faber united their armies to help their allies, the Fula, to plunder the Susu capital, Thia, when weakened by throne fighting, and installing their own candidate there, which benefited Fula, Faber, and Lightburn. The 1840s are described as a great flowering period for the region's trade.

On January 17, 1852, the British and Sierra Leone, in agreement with the domestic ruler, imposed a ban on the slave trade of the region, a ban which the lower river region had already adopted. Mary Faber de Sanger, who perceived the treaty as a hostile act from the lower river trader in alliance with Freetown's "mulatto" and also as a way of releasing the lower river's Susa tribe from her allied Fula tribe power, which would hurt her business, closed alliance with Niara Bely and Charles Wilkinson, and together they pillaged the Susu region by the lower river. However, the war ended with a defeat for Faber, Bely and Wilkinson (1855). Around this time, the Atlantic slave trade experienced its final declined, however, and the slave traders of the region gradually started to invest in other business.

== Death ==
In 1878, she was baptised as an Anglican, later archaeological investigations discovered the remains of the original Anglican church at Farenya. She died on 14 April 1879, with the news commemorated by the firing of the settlement's cannon the morning after. A mission who was present at the time wrote "The infirmities of age had pressed heavily upon her ever since her baptism, and at last she died somewhat suddenly". She was initially buried in a hole under a cheese tree in the middle of the village. In 1966, a graveyard was built around the location and her remains were re-interred in a cement grave. Additional, empty, graves were built for her husband and her son.
