= James Bower (agrarian leader) =

Canadian agrarian leader

James Bower (26 January 1860 – 16 May 1921) was born to Irish immigrants in Canada West.

Bower became a successful farmer and farm leader in western Canada. He served for a time as president of the Canadian Council of Agriculture.
