= Australia Station =

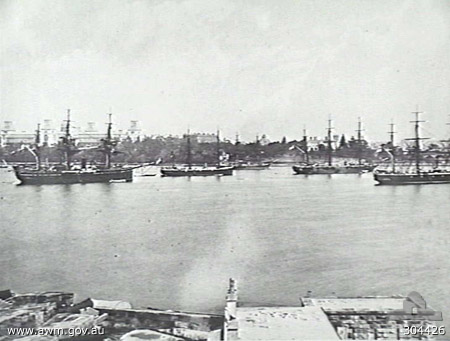
- Royal Navy squadron on the Australia Station moored in Sydney in 1880
- Active: Created in 1859
- Disbanded: 1913
- Country: United Kingdom, subsequently Australia
- Branch: Royal Navy 1848–1911; (United Kingdom) Commonwealth Naval Forces 1911–1913; Royal Australian Navy 1913
- Type: Fleet

The Australia Station was the British, and later Australian, naval command responsible for the waters around the Australian continent. Australia Station was under the command of the Commander-in-Chief, Australia Station, whose rank varied over time.

== History ==
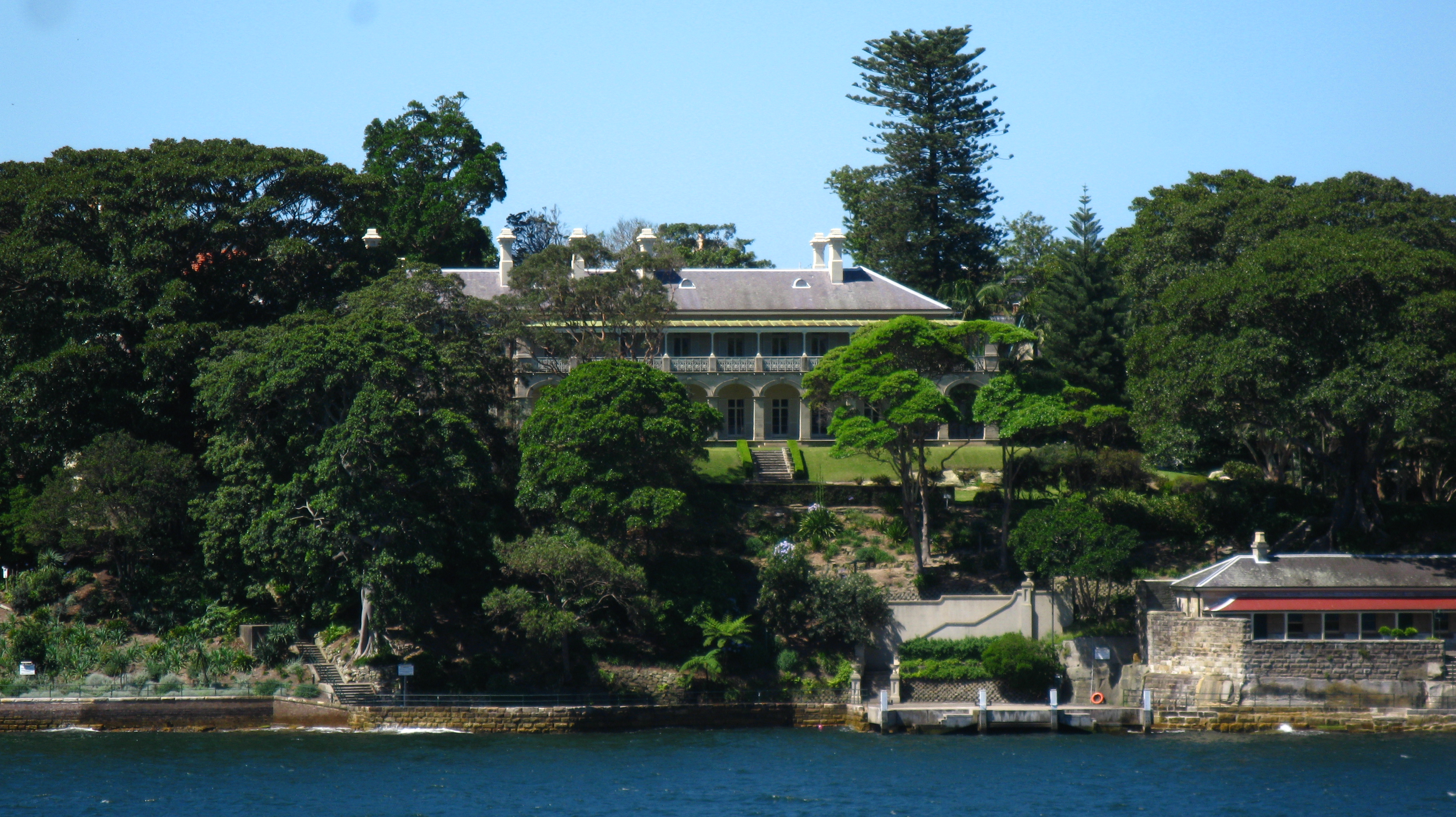
Admiralty House, Sydney, the residence for the Commander-in-Chief of the Royal Navy's Australia Squadron from 1885 to 1913

In the years following the establishment of the British colony of New South Wales in 1788, Royal Navy ships stationed in Australian waters formed part of the East Indies Squadron and came under the command of the East Indies Station. From the 1820s, a ship was sent annually to New South Wales, and occasionally to New Zealand.

In 1848, an Australian Division of the East Indies Station was established, and in 1859 the British Admiralty established an independent command, the Australia Station, under the command of a commodore who was assigned as Commander-in-Chief, Australia Station. The Australian Squadron was created to which British naval ships serving on the Australia Station were assigned. The changes were partially in recognition of the fact that a large part of the East Indies Station had been detached to Australian waters, and also reflecting growing concern for the strategic situation in the western Pacific in general, and in Tahiti and New Zealand in particular. In 1884, the commander of the Australia Station was upgraded to the rank of rear admiral.

At its establishment, the Australia Station encompassed Australia and New Zealand, with its eastern boundary including Samoa and Tonga, its western edge in the Indian Ocean, south of India and its southern edge defined by the Antarctic Circle. The boundaries were modified in 1864, 1872 and 1893. At its largest, the Australia Station reached from the Equator to the Antarctic in its greatest north–south axis, and covered a quarter of the Southern Hemisphere in its extreme east–west dimension, including Papua New Guinea, New Zealand, Melanesia and Polynesia.

On 1 January 1901, Australia became a federation of six States, as the Commonwealth of Australia, which took over the defence forces from all the States. In March 1901, the Commonwealth took over the colonial navies to form the Commonwealth Naval Forces. The Australian and New Zealand governments agreed with the Imperial government to help fund the Royal Navy's Australian Squadron, while the Admiralty committed itself to maintain the Squadron at a constant strength. In 1902, the commander of the Australia Station was upgraded to the rank of vice admiral. The boundaries were again modified in 1908. On 10 July 1911, King George V granted the title of "Royal Australian Navy" to the CNF.

The Australian Squadron was disbanded in 1911 and the Australia Station passed to the Commonwealth Naval Forces. The Station was reduced to cover Australia and its island dependencies to the north and east, excluding New Zealand and its surrounds, which became part of the China Station and called the New Zealand Naval Forces. In 1913, the Royal Australian Navy came under Australian command, and responsibility for the reduced Australia Station passed to the new RAN. The Royal Navy's Australia Station ceased in 1913 and responsibility handed over to the Royal Australian Navy and its Sydney based depots, dockyards and structures were gifted to the Commonwealth of Australia. The Royal Navy continued to support the RAN and provided additional blue-water defence capability in the Pacific up to the early years of World War II.

In 1921, a separate New Zealand Station was established, and the New Zealand Naval Forces renamed the New Zealand Division of the Royal Navy. In 1958, the Australia Station was redrawn again, now to include Papua New Guinea.

== Commanders-in-Chief, Australia Station ==
The following is a list of the Royal Navy officers who occupied the post of Commander-in-Chief, Australia Station:

Rank	Name	Term began	Term ended
Commander-in-Chief, Australia Station
Commodore	William Loring	26 March 1859	10 March 1860
Commodore	Beauchamp Seymour, CB	10 March 1860	21 July 1862
Commodore	William Burnett, CB	21 July 1862	7 February 1863
Commodore	Sir William Wiseman, Bt. CB	20 April 1863	23 May 1866
Commodore	Rochfort Maguire	23 May 1866	28 May 1867
Commodore	Rowley Lambert, CB	28 May 1867	8 April 1870
Commodore	Frederick Stirling	8 April 1870	22 May 1873
Commodore	James Goodenough, CB, CMG	22 May 1873	20 August 1875
Commodore	Anthony Hoskins, CB	7 September 1875	12 September 1878
Commodore	John Wilson	12 September 1878	21 January 1882
Commodore	James Erskine	21 January 1882	12 November 1884
Rear Admiral	Sir George Tryon, KCB	12 November 1884	1 February 1887
Rear Admiral	Henry Fairfax	1 February 1887	10 September 1889
Rear Admiral	The Hon. Lord Charles Scott, CB	10 September 1889	12 September 1892
Rear Admiral	Nathaniel Bowden-Smith	12 September 1892	1 November 1894
Rear Admiral	Cyprian Bridge	1 November 1894	1 November 1897
Rear Admiral	Hugo Pearson	1 November 1898	1 October 1900
Rear Admiral	Lewis Beaumont	1 October 1900	16 January 1903
Vice Admiral	Sir Arthur Fanshawe, KCMG	16 January 1903	10 September 1905
Vice Admiral	Sir Wilmot Fawkes, KCB, KCVO	10 September 1905	31 December 1907
Vice Admiral	Sir Richard Poore, Bt. KCB, CVO	31 December 1907	31 December 1910
Vice Admiral	Sir George King-Hall, KCB, CVO	31 December 1910	23 June 1913

== List of ships assigned to the Station ==
This is a list of ships that were assigned to the station between 1859 until 1913. The Australian Squadron was replaced by the Royal Australian Navy Fleet when it sailed into Sydney Harbour on 4 October 1913.

Ship	Date joined	Date left	Notes
Iris	25 March 1859	1861	Flagship between 25 March 1859 until 10 March 1860. Undertook operations during First Taranaki War in New Zealand.
Niger	25 March 1859	1860	Undertook operations during First Taranaki War.
Pelorus	May 1859	July 1862	Flagship between 10 March 1859 until July 1862. Undertook operations during First Taranaki War.
Fawn	30 October 1859	11 April 1863	
Bramble	1859	May 1859	Tender to Squadron.
Cordelia (1856)	1859	December 1860	Undertook operations during First Taranaki War.
Elk	1859	1860	Undertook operations during First Taranaki War.
Harrier (1854)	December 1860	September 1864	Participated in rescue operation when HMS Orpheus was wrecked in Manukau Harbour, New Zealand, and was also grounded but was refloated. Undertook operations during Invasion of Waikato and also the Tauranga Campaign in New Zealand.
Miranda	December 1860	September 1864	Undertook operations during Invasion of Waikato and also the Tauranga Campaign in New Zealand.
Pioneer (1856)	March 1862	1863	
Orpheus	July 1862	7 February 1863	Flagship between July 1862 until 7 February 1863. Was wrecked in Manukau Harbour with the loss of 189 seaman including Commander-in-chief, Australia Station Commodore William Farquharson Burnett. 70 crewmen survived.
Beatrice	September 1862	1880	Jointly owned by Royal Navy and Colony of South Australia until purchased outright by South Australia in 1880. Conducted survey operations around Northern Australia.
Eclipse	November 1862	1866	Undertook operations during Invasion of Waikato and also the Tauranga Campaign.
Curacoa (1854)	20 April 1863	1866	Flagship from 20 April 1863 until May 1866. Undertook operations during Invasion of Waikato and also the Tauranga Campaign.
Hecate	June 1863	1864	Conducted survey operations of Botany Bay, Moreton Bay and Brisbane River.
Esk	July 1863	2 July 1867	Undertook operations during Invasion of Waikato and also the Tauranga Campaign.
Falcon	December 1863	November 1867	Undertook operations during Invasion of Waikato and also the Tauranga Campaign.
Salamander	February 1864	4 July 1867	Conducted survey operations along Great Barrier Reef and between Wilsons Promontory and Port Phillip Bay.
Brisk	October 1864	1868	Provided escort for operations during Second Taranaki War, New Zealand.
Challenger (1858)	May 1866	1870	Flagship between May 1866 and 3 September 1870. Conducted a punitive operation in 1866 against some Fijian natives.
Virago	30 November 1866	28 June 1871	Conducted survey operations along Great Barrier Reef, Queensland, Norfolk Island and New Zealand.
Charybdis	March 1867	November 1868	
Rosario	November 1867	1875	Undertook anti-blackbirding operations in the South Pacific.
Blanche	January 1868	1875	Undertook a punitive operation in 1869 against some Solomon Islands natives. Conducted survey operations of Rabaul Harbour.
Clio (1858)	17 April 1870	16 October 1873	Flagship between 3 September 1870 and 17 September 1873. Ran into a reef and holed in Bligh Sound, New Zealand, in 1871 and repaired.
Basilisk	March 1871	1874	Undertook survey operations around Eastern New Guinea, under the command of Captain John Moresby. Undertook anti-blackbirding operations in the South Pacific.
Cossack	September 1871	October 1873	
Dido	1871	1875	Ran aground at Hobart, Tasmania in 1875 but was refloated.
Pearl	22 May 1873	1875	Flagship from 17 September 1873 until 7 September 1875. Commander-in-chief Commodore James Graham Goodenough and two sailors died from poisonous arrows fired by natives from Santa Cruz Islands in 1875.
Conflict	August 1873	1882	Built by John Cuthbert, Sydney. Undertook anti-blackbirding operations in the South Pacific. In 1879 undertook punitive operation in against some Solomon Islands natives.
Alacrity	1873	1882	Built in Sydney as Ethel. Undertook survey operations around Fiji and Solomon Islands. Sold to Colony of New South Wales and served as a powder hulk.
Beagle	1873	March 1883	Built by John Cuthbert, Darling Harbour, Sydney. Undertook anti-blackbirding operations in the South Pacific. In 1879 undertook punitive operation against some Solomon Islands natives.
Renard	1873	March 1883	Built by John Cuthbert, Sydney. Undertook anti-blackbirding operations in the South Pacific. Undertook survey operations around Fiji and Russell Islands.
Sandfly	1873	1883	Built by John Cuthbert, Sydney. Undertook anti-blackbirding operations in the South Pacific. Undertook survey operations around Solomon Islands and New Guinea. Commanding officer, Lieutenant Bower, and three sailors were killed by natives on Mandolina Island, near Guadalcanal.
Barracouta	August 1874	July 1876	Participated in Samoan Operations in 1876.
Sappho	December 1874	August 1878	
Nymphe	March 1875	November 1878	
Sapphire	March 1875	July 1879	
Wolverine	7 September 1875	January 1882	Flagship from 7 September 1875 until 21 January 1882. Sold to Colony of New South Wales and served as a training ship.
Emerald	September 1878	October 1881	Took punitive action against natives who killed commander of HMS Sandfly.
Cormorant	1878	1882	Took punitive action against natives who killed commander of HMS Sandfly.
Danae	1878	August 1880	
Miranda	September 1880	May 1886	
Alert	1880	1882	
Meda	1880	1886	Undertook survey work along North West Australia. She was sold in 1887 to the Colony of Western Australia.
Diamond	October 1881	August 1888	
Espiegle	November 1881	March 1885	
Nelson	21 January 1882	3 September 1888	Flagship from 21 January 1882 until 1888.
Lark	1882	1886	
Raven	25 April 1883	October 1890	
Harrier (1881)	September 1883	1888	
Undine	September 1883	1888	
Swinger	2 October 1883	August 1891	
Dart	1883	1904	
Paluma	1884	1895	Built for Colony of Queensland, she was commissioned in Royal Navy on loan. She was returned to Queensland in 1895 and renamed HMQS Paluma.
Myrmidon	14 March 1885	1888	Undertook surveys along the North of Australia, Darwin and Bass Strait.
Opal	March 1885	11 May 1890	
Rapid	July 1886	1 December 1897	
Flying Fish	1886	1886	
Calliope	September 1887	October 1889	Participated in the 1889 Samoan conflict.
Egeria	1887	1894	She undertook survey work around Western Pacific islands and Hobart.
Royalist	May 1888	June 1899	Sent to the Gilbert Islands and on 27 May 1892 the islands were proclaimed to be a British protectorate. Participated in the 1899 Samoan civil war.
Orlando	1 September 1888	1898	Flagship from 1 September 1888 until November 1897.
Lizard	January 1889	1904	Participated during the Boxer Rebellion in 1900.
Rambler	October 1889	1890	She undertook survey work along North Western coast of Australia.
Penguin	14 January 1890	1888	She undertook survey work around Western Pacific islands, New Zealand and Great Barrier Reef. She was transferred for harbour service at Sydney before being commissioned into the RAN as HMAS Penguin a depot ship.
Mildura	18 March 1890	1905	Part of the auxiliary squadron.
Goldfinch	March 1890	August 1899	
Cordelia (1881)	1890	1891	During practice firing one of her guns burst killing five sailors on 28 June 1891.
Curacoa (1878)	1890	December 1894	Sent to the Ellice Islands and between 9 and 16 October 1892 made a formal declaration on each island that it was to be a British protectorate.
Tauranga	27 January 1891	1904	Part of the auxiliary squadron. Participated in the 1899 Samoan civil war.
Ringarooma	3 February 1891	1904	Grounded on a reef at Malekula Island, New Hebrides on 31 August 1894 and was towed off by a French warship. Part of the auxiliary squadron.
Katoomba	24 March 1891	January 1906	Part of the auxiliary squadron.
Wallaroo	31 March 1891	January 1906	Part of the auxiliary squadron. Participated during the Boxer Rebellion in 1900. One of her boilers exploded on 7 January 1904 killing 4 sailors.
Boomerang	1891	1904	
Karrakatta	1891	1903	
Ringdove	1891	February 1901	
Pylades	November 1894	29 January 1905	
Waterwitch	1895	1900	
Torch	February 1897	1913	
Royal Arthur	4 November 1897	6 April 1904	Flagship from 4 November 1897 until April 1904.
Mohawk	December 1897	1900	Escorted New South Wales Naval Brigade to China during the Boxer Rebellion in 1900.
Porpoise	December 1897	June 1901	Participated in the 1899 Samoan civil war.
Archer	1900	December 1901(?)	
Phoebe	19 February 1901	23 December 1905	
Sparrow	February 1901	1904	Later commissioned in New Zealand Marine Department as training ship NZS Amokura in 1905
Psyche	22 September 1903	1913	Was later commissioned in RAN in 1915 as HMAS Psyche.
Mutine	December 1903	February 1905	
Clio (1903)	19 January 1904	14 April 1905	
Cadmus	13 April 1904	May 1905	
Euryalus	July 1904	1905	Flagship between 26 March 1904 and February 1905.
Challenger (1902)	1904	1912	
Powerful	February 1905	December 1911	Flagship from 1905 to 1911.
Pegasus	March 1905	March 1913	
Pyramus	16 September 1905	1913	She grounded on a reef near Cooktown on 22 June 1907 and was refloated.
Pioneer (1899)	September 1905	1 March 1913	Commissioned as HMAS Pioneer in 1913.
Encounter	December 1905	21 June 1912	Commissioned as HMAS Encounter on 1 July 1912.
Cambrian	1905	1913	Flagship between January and October 1913, the last flagship of Australia Station
Prometheus	1905	1913	
Fantome	1906	1913	Undertook survey work along the North and Eastern coasts of Australia and New Guinea.
Sealark	1910	1913	Undertook survey work in the Torres Strait and Solomon Islands.
Drake	30 November 1911	1 January 1913	Flagship between 1911 and 1 January 1913.

== See also ==
- Vice admiral (Australia)
