= HMS Fawn =

Six ships of the Royal Navy have borne the name HMS Fawn:

- HMS Fawn (1805), a 16-gun brig-corvette, originally the French ship Faune, that Goliath captured in the English Channel in 1805 and that disappears from the records in 1806.
- HMS Fawn (1807), an 18-gun sloop-of-war launched in 1807, sold in 1818; she then made seven whaling voyages from 1820 until she was broken up in 1844.
- HMS Fawn (1840), a 6-gun brigantine, originally the Portuguese slaver Caroline, captured by HMS Electra on 25 March 1839 near Rio de Janeiro. She was purchased there on 27 May 1840, converted in 1842 to a tank (water) vessel at the Cape of Good Hope Station, and sold in May 1847 to the Natal Colonial Government.
- HMS Fawn (1856), a 17-gun wood screw sloop-of-war launched in 1856, used as a survey ship from 1876 and sold in 1884
- HMS Fawn (1897) was a Fawn-class destroyer launched in 1897 and sold in 1919
- HMS Fawn (A325) was a Bulldog-class survey ship launched in 1968 and sold in 1991

== Battle honours ==
Ships named Fawn have earned the following battle honours: (Note: In the Royal Navy, and other Commonwealth navies that follow the traditions of the RN, battle honours awarded to a ship are inherited by subsequent ships to bear the same name, and are displayed on the ship's honours board.)

- Gabbard, 1653
- Martinique, 1809
- Guadeloupe, 1810
- Belgian Coast, 1914−18
