= Australian Squadron =

Imperial Defence Act 1888 (Note: Section 12.)
- Act of Parliament
- Parliament of the United Kingdom
- Long title: An Act for defraying the Expenses of carrying into effect an Agreement for Naval Defence with the Australasian Colonies, and providing for the Defence of certain Ports and Coaling Stations, and for making further provision for Imperial Defence.
- Citation: 51 & 52 Vict. c. 32
- Territorial extent: United Kingdom

Dates
- Royal assent: 13 August 1888
- Commencement: 13 August 1888 (Note: The Acts of Parliament (Commencement) Act 1793.)
- Repealed: 23 May 1950

Other legislation
- Repealed by: Finance Act 1894; Statute Law Revision Act 1908; Statute Law Revision Act 1950

Status: Repealed

Text of statute as originally enacted

The Australian Squadron was the name given to the British naval force assigned to the Australia Station from 1859 to 1911.

The Squadron was initially a small force of Royal Navy warships based in Sydney, and although intended to protect the colonies of Australia and New Zealand, the ships were primarily used for surveying and police work. The isolation of Australia from the rest of the British Empire meant the force was easily neglected, and by the 1870s, was perceived to be useless for its intended role.

Following the passing of the Australasian Naval Defence Act 1887 (51 Vict. No. 39 (NZ)), the Australasian Naval Force Act 1887 (51 Vict. No. 22 (NSW)), the Australasian Naval Force Act 1887 (No. 829 (Vic.)), the Australasian Naval Force Act 1887 (51 Vict No. 18 (Tas.)) and the Imperial Defence Act 1888 (51 & 52 Vict. c. 32 (Imp.)) an additional 'Auxiliary Squadron' was assigned to the station by the British Admiralty with the responsibility for protecting trade in the region. During the early 1900s, the Australian and New Zealand governments agreed to help fund the squadron, while the Admiralty committed itself to keeping the squadron at a constant strength.

As a British force, the Australian Squadron ceased on 4 October 1913, when the ships of the Royal Australian Navy (RAN) entered Sydney Harbour for the first time. However, the term was subsequently used between 1926 and 1949 to refer to the ships of the RAN: after the decommissioning and scuttling of the battlecruiser HMAS Australia and other cutbacks, the term 'Australian Fleet' was thought to be inappropriate to describe the navy's strength. HMAS Melbourne served as squadron flagship between 1922 and 1928.

== See also ==
- List of ships assigned to the Australian Squadron
- Australia Station

== Bibliography ==
- Dennis, Peter; Grey, Jeffrey; Morris, Ewan; Prior, Robin (2008). The Oxford Companion to Australian Military History (2nd ed.). South Melbourne, VIC: Oxford University Press. ISBN 978-0-19-551784-2. OCLC 271822831.
