= List of ship launches in 1872 =

The list of ship launches in 1872 includes a chronological list of some ships launched in 1872.

Date	Ship	Class	Builder	Location	Country	Notes
1 January	Chrystal	Barque	Messrs. J. Humphrey & Co.	Aberdeen	United Kingdom	For private owner.
8 January	Cornelia	Steamship	Denton, Gray & Co.	West Hartlepool	United Kingdom	For private owner.
10 January	Gazelle	Steam yacht	Messrs. Harvey	Wivenhoe	United Kingdom	For Colonel Tomline.
11 January	Lucretia	Sailing barge	W. Curtis	Ipswich	United Kingdom	For W. Curling.
11 January	Miramare	Royal yacht	Messrs. Samuda Bros.	Cubitt Town	United Kingdom	For Franz Joseph I.
13 January	Courrières	Steamship	Messrs. Thomas Wingate & Co.	Whiteinch	United Kingdom	For Messrs. Tilloy, Delaune & Co.
13 January	Isabella	Schooner	Messrs. Rawstorn & Allanston	Freckleton	United Kingdom	For private owners.
13 January	Talisman	Steamship	Blackwood & Gordon	Glasgow	United Kingdom	For Messrs. George Gibson & Co.
15 January	Principe Amedeo	Principe Amedeo-class ironclad	Regio Cantiere di Castellammare di Stabia	Castellammare di Stabia	Italy	For Regia Marina.
16 January	Lady Josyan	Steamship	M. Pearse & Co.	Stockton-on-Tees	United Kingdom	For private owner.
21 January	Omara	Sloop	John Barter & Son	Brixham	United Kingdom	For Thomas Callard & John. S. Paddon.
24 January	Selica	Steamship	Messrs. Alexander Stephen & Sons	Linthouse	United Kingdom	For F. J. G. Servais.
24 January	Parthenon	Steamship	Messrs. William Hamilton & Co.	Port Glasgow	United Kingdom	For Messrs. Lambert Brothers & Scott.
25 January	Dover Castle	Steamship	Messrs. Barclay, Curle & Co.	Whiteinch	United Kingdom	For Castle Line.
25 January	Segesta	Steamship	William Watson	Sunderland	United Kingdom	For La Trinacria Societa di Navigazione a Vapeur.
27 January	Acacia	Steamship	Denton, Gray & Co.	West Hartlepool	United Kingdom	For private owner.
27 January	Campanil	Steamship	Messrs. Robert Duncan & Co.	Port Glasgow	United Kingdom	For Mr. Wilson and others.
29 January	Othello	Steamship	Earle's Shipbuilding Company	Hull	United Kingdom	For Messrs. Thomas Wilson, Sons, & Co.
30 January	Chih-li	Steamship	Messrs. A. & J. Inglis	Pointhouse	United Kingdom	For Shanghai Steam Navigation Company.
January	Cynthia	Steamship	Messrs. W. Hamilton & Co.	Port Glasgow	United Kingdom	For William Watkins.
Unknown date	Sing Tai	Barque	James Beeching	Great Yarmouth	United Kingdom	For Robert Love.
January	Woodburn	East Indiaman	Messrs. Barclay, Curle & Co.	Whiteinch	United Kingdom	For Robert Shankland & Co.
7 February	Swinger	Ariel-class gunboat	Pembroke Dockyard	Pembroke	United Kingdom	For Royal Navy.
7 February	Wastdale	Steamship	Denton, Gray & Co.	West Hartlepool	United Kingdom	For private owner.
8 February	Cyphrenes	Steamship	Messrs. Alexander Stephen & Sons	Dundee	United Kingdom	For Messrs. Alexander Stephen & Sons.
8 February	Ormesby	Steamship	Richardson, Duck & Co.	South Stockton	United Kingdom	For private owner.
10 February	Albatross	Steamship	M. Pearse & Co.	Stockton-on-Tees	United Kingdom	For private owner.
10 February	Bahia	Paddle steamer	Messrs. Stephen & Sons	Whiteinch	United Kingdom	For W. R. Garrison.
10 February	Birkenhead	Steamship	Messrs. R. J. Evans & Co.	Liverpool	United Kingdom	For Birkenhead Commissioners.
10 February	name	Steamship	Withy, Alexander & Co.	Middleton	United Kingdom	For private owner.
10 February	Inchkeith	Steamship	Messrs. Wingate	Whiteinch	United Kingdom	For G. G. Mackay.
10 February	Jane Williams	Steamship	Sparrow and Thomas	Queenstown	(United Kingdom of Great Britain and Ireland) New Zealand	For private owner.
10 February	Onda	Steamship	Messrs. John Fullarton & Co.	Paisley	United Kingdom	For Charles Henderson.
10 February	The Alloa	Merchantman	Adamson	Allos	United Kingdom	For private owner.
12 February	Corinth	Steamship	William Watson	Sunderland	United Kingdom	For Corinthian Steamship Company.
12 February	Osprey	Steamship	Messrs. Thomas B. Seath & Co.	Rutherglen	United Kingdom	For Steel & M'Caskill.
12 February	Polynesian	Steamship	Messrs. Robert Steele & Co.	Greenock	United Kingdom	For Montreal Ocean Steamship Company.
12 February	Truxillo	Paddle steamer	Messrs. John Elder & Co.	Govan	United Kingdom	For Pacific Steam Navigation Company.
13 February	Benachie	Steamship	Messrs. Hall, Russell & Co.	Aberdeen	United Kingdom	For Messrs. J. B. Adam & Co.
13 February	Surprise	Steamship	Messrs. Henderson, Coulborn & Co.	Renfrew	United Kingdom	For E. de Bursche.
24 February	Batavier II	Paddle steamer	Fijenoord	Rotterdam	Netherlands	For Stoomvaart Maatschappij Nederland.
24 February	Mercury	Steamship	Bowdler, Chaffer & Co.	Seacombe	United Kingdom	For Ocean Steam Ship Co.
24 February	Riachuelo	Dredger	Messrs. J. & G. Rennie	Greenwich	United Kingdom	For Argentine Government.
24 February	Vire	Indre-class transport	Arsenal de Lorient	Lorient	France	For French Navy
26 February	Amity	Fishing smack	Robertson	Ipswich	United Kingdom	For Mr. Blake.
27 February	Ettrickdale	Merchantman	Messrs. Barclay, Curle & Co.	Stobcross	United Kingdom	For Messrs. J. & A. Roxburgh.
28 February	America	Merchantman	Messrs. Charles Connell & Co.	Whiteinch	United Kingdom	For John H. Watt.
29 February	Frolic	Frolic-class gunvessel		Chatham Dockyard	United Kingdom	For Royal Navy.
29 February	Kestrel	Frolic-class gunvessel		Chatham Dockyard	United Kingdom	For Royal Navy.
February	Circassian	Steamship	Robert Thompson	Sunderland	United Kingdom	For John Lacy.
February	Kaffir	Steamship	Messrs. A. M'Millan & Son	Dumbarton	United Kingdom	For Cape and Natal Steam Navigation Company.
7 March	Atalanta	Steamship	Denton, Gray & Co.	West Hartlepool	United Kingdom	For private owner.
8 March	J. H. Lorentzen	Steamship	G. Short	Sunderland	United Kingdom	For John Storey Barwick.
9 March	Harrier	Yacht	Messrs. Hansen & Sons	Cowes	United Kingdom	For G. Pollock.
11 March	Daphne	Schooner	Messrs. Camper & Nicholson	Gosport	United Kingdom	For private owner.
11 March	Ilo	Steamship	Messrs. John Elder & Co.	Govan	United Kingdom	For Pacific Steam Navigation Company.
11 March	Maitland	Steamship	Messrs. R. Duncan & Co.	Port Glasgow	United Kingdom	For Messrs. Malcolms & Co.
11 March	Sir Arthur Kennedy	Paddle steamer	Messrs. William Hamilton & Co.	Port Glasgow	United Kingdom	For Messrs. Child, Mills & Co.
11 March	Star of Germany	Sailing ship	Harland & Wolff	Belfast	United Kingdom	For J. P. Corry & Co.
11 March	Wilia	Yacht	Messrs. Camper & Nicholson	Gosport	United Kingdom	For private owner. Collided with HMS Victory on being launched.
12 March	California	steamship	Messrs. Alexander Stephen & Sons	Linthouse	United Kingdom	For Anchor Line.
12 March	Fidget	Ant-class gunboat		Chatham Dockyard	United Kingdom	For Royal Navy.
12 March	Kyles	Steamship	Messrs. John Fullarton & Co.	Paisley	United Kingdom	For private owner.
12 March	Rupert	Battleship		Chatham Dockyard	United Kingdom	For Royal Navy.
13 March	Badger	Ant-class gunboat		Chatham Dockyard	United Kingdom	For Royal Navy.
13 March	Calder	Steamship	Messrs. J. & R. Swan	Dumbarton	United Kingdom	For Messrs. Burrell & M'Laren.
13 March	Puerto de Buenos Ayres	Paddle tug	Messrs. Thomas Wingate & Co.	Whiteinch	United Kingdom	For Government of Argentina.
23 March	Alpha	Steamship	Messrs. Archibald M'Millan & Son	Dumbarton	United Kingdom	For private owner.
23 March	Arncott	Steamship	Withy, Alexander & Co.	Middleton	United Kingdom	For private owner.
25 March	Thunderer	Devastation-class battleship	Pembroke Dockyard	Pembroke	United Kingdom	For Royal Navy.
26 March	Louisa	Steamship	Messrs. R. E. Smellie & Co.	Pyrmont	New South Wales	For E. Mellor. First iron steamship built in New South Wales.
26 March	Susan	Steamship	William Watson	Sunderland	United Kingdom	For Henry Collings & others.
27 March	Douglas	Steamship	Denton, Gray & Co.	West Hartlepool	United Kingdom	For private owner.
28 March	Gareloch	Paddle steamer	Messrs. Henry Murray & Co.	Port Glasgow	United Kingdom	For North British Steam Packet Company.
28 March	Vicksburg	Steamship	Messrs. Archibald M'Milland & Son	Dumbarton	United Kingdom	For Liverpool and Mississippi Steamship Company.
30 March	Frisia	Steamship	Messrs. Caird & Co.	Greenock	United Kingdom	For Hamburg-Amerikanische Packetfahrt-Actien-Gesellschaft.
March	Ben Nevis	Steamship	James Laing	Sunderland	United Kingdom	For J. Morrison.
March	Edinburgh Castle	Steamship	Messrs. R. Napier & Sons	Govan	United Kingdom	For Castle Line.
March	Gogo	Steamship	Messrs. Scott & Co.	Greenock	United Kingdom	For Messrs. Scott & Co.
March	Horseguards	Steamship	Messrs. Aitken & Mansel	Whiteinch	United Kingdom	For private owners.
March	Lady Lycett	Steamship	London and Glasgow Engineering and Iron Shipbuilding Co.	Glasgow	United Kingdom	For J. A. Dunkerley & Co.
March	Scrabster	Steamship	Messrs. C. W. Dodger & Co.	North Shields	United Kingdom	For Messrs. James Gerry & Partners.
4 April	Benmore	Steamship	Messrs. Blackwodd & Gordon	Port Glasgow	United Kingdom	For Messrs. Weatherly, Mead & Husay.
9 April	Esperance	Yacht	D. Robinson	Gosport	United Kingdom	For private owner.
9 April	Helen	steam yacht	Messrs. T. B. Seath & Co.	Rutherglen	United Kingdom	For Marquess of Conyngham.
9 April	Josefa	Barque	Messrs. Alexander Stephens & Sons	Linthouse	United Kingdom	For Messrs. D. H. Wätjen & Co.
9 April	Ospray	Smack	Messrs. J. & R. Swan	Maryhill	United Kingdom	For Daniel Sutherland.
9 April	Stamford	Steamship	M. Pearse & Co.	Stockton-on-Tees	United Kingdom	For private owner.
9 April	Trinidad	Steamship	Messrs. James & George Thomson	Govan	United Kingdom	For Messrs. Burns.
10 April	Japan	Barque	John Watts	Dysart	United Kingdom	For J. W. Robertson.
10 April	Senegal	Steamship	Messrs. Cunliffe & Dunlop	Port Glasgow	United Kingdom	For British and African Steam Navigation Co.
11 April	Serf	Schooner	Messrs. Camper & Nicholson	Gosport	United Kingdom	For J. Tempest.
13 April	Jarl	Steamship	Messrs. Hall, Russell & Co	Footdee	United Kingdom	For Messrs. Mudie.
17 April	Manicougan	Lightship	Richardson, Duck & Co.	South Stockton	United Kingdom	For private owner.
23 April	Ida	Steamship	Messrs. Blackwood & Gordon	Port Glasgow	United Kingdom	For H. L. Seligmann.
23 April	Yangwu	corvette	Foochow Arsenal	Foochow	China	For Imperial Chinese Navy.
24 April	Erzherzog Albrecht	Ironclad	Stabilimento Tecnico Triestino	Trieste	Austria-Hungary	For Austro-Hungarian Navy.
24 April	Belgrano	Ocean liner		Le Havre	France	For Compagnie des Chargeurs Réunis.
24 April	Dracæna	Schooner	John White	Cowes	United Kingdom	For J. D. Lee.
25 April	Cathay	Steamship	Messrs. William Denny & Bros.	Dumbarton	United Kingdom	For Peninsular and Oriental Steam Navigation Company.
25 April	Gwendoline	Schooner	Messrs. Camper & Nicholson	Gosport	United Kingdom	For Major Ewing.
25 April	Kronos	Steamship	Denton, Gray & Co.	West Hartlepool	United Kingdom	For private owner.
25 April	Pernambuco	Steamship	Withy, Alexander & Co.	Middleton	United Kingdom	For private owner.
25 April	Walmer Castle	steamship	Messrs. Barclay, Curle & Co'	Whiteinch	United Kingdom	For Castle Line.
25 April	Windsor Castle	Steamship	Messrs. R. Napier & Sons	Govan	United Kingdom	For Castle Line.
27 April	Emma Grace	Schooner	Messrs. P. Barclay & Sons	Ardrossan	United Kingdom	For private owner.
27 April	Puerto Rico	Steamship	Messrs. Henry Murray & Co.	Port Glasgow	United Kingdom	For Messrs. William White & Co.
27 April	Vale of Lorton	Steamship	Messrs. Thomas Roydon & Sons	Liverpool	United Kingdom	For Vale Line.
April	Ant	Steamship	Messrs. John Reid & Co.	Port Glasgow	United Kingdom	For Messrs. Horsfall & Sons.
April	Bastia	Steamship	Messrs. Scott & Co.	Greenock	United Kingdom	For private owner.
April	Beaver	Steamship	Messrs. Dobie & Co.	Govan	United Kingdom	For private owner.
April	Bessie	Steamship	Messrs. John Reid & Co.	Port Glasgow	United Kingdom	For George Robertson.
April	Heron	Steamship	London and Glasgow Engineering and Iron Shipbuilding Co.	Govan	United Kingdom	For Messrs. Steel & M'Gaskill.
April	Juliet	Yacht	Messrs. Hansen	Cowes	United Kingdom	For Mr. Sterling.
April	Manuela	Steamship	Messrs. Henderson, Coulborn & Co.	Renfrew	United Kingdom	For private owner.
7 May	La Galissonnière	La Galissonnière-class ironclad		Brest	France	For French Navy.
7 May	Princess Louise	Paddle steamer	Messrs. Tod & MacGregor	Glasgow	United Kingdom	For private owner.
8 May	Dream	Smack	Robert Westaway	Lowestoft	United Kingdom	For private owner.
8 May	Eva Mary	Steam launch		Portsmouth	United Kingdom	For Floating Bridge Company.
9 May	Cartvale	East Indiaman	Messrs. John Reid & Co.	Port Glasgow	United Kingdom	For Messrs. Carswell & Davie.
9 May	Thorwaldsen	Steamship	T. R. Oswald	Sunderland	United Kingdom	For Baltischer Lloyd.
9 May	Victoria	Steamship	Messrs. R. Duncan & Co.	Port Glasgow	United Kingdom	For Anchor Line.
10 May	Pétrel	Pétrel-class wheeled aviso	Chantiers et Ateliers Augustin Normand	Le Havre	France	For French Navy
11 May	Alert	Steamship	Messrs. John Humphrey & Co.	Aberdeen	United Kingdom	For private owners.
18 May	Bessemer	Steamship	Richardson, Duck & Co.	South Stockton	United Kingdom	For private owner.
23 May	Calcutta	Steamship	Messrs. A. & J. Inglis	Pointhouse	United Kingdom	For British India Steam Navigation Company.
23 May	Caledonian	Steamship	Richardson, Duck & Co.	South Stockton	United Kingdom	For private owner.
23 May	Corisande	Yacht	Michael Ratsey	Cowes	United Kingdom	For John Richardson.
23 May	SS Elizabeth Martin (2)	Steamship	Messrs. Robert Napier & Sons	Govan	United Kingdom	For Alexander Currie.
23 May	Enmore	Steamship	M. Pearse & Co.	Stockton-on-Tees	United Kingdom	For private owner.
23 May	Mermerus	Steamship	Messrs. Barclay, Curle & Co.	Whiteinch	United Kingdom	For Messrs. A. & J. H. Carmichael & Co.
23 May	Tacora	Steamship	Messrs. John Elder & Co.	Fairfield	United Kingdom	For Pacific Steam Navigation Company.
24 May	Hai'an	Frigate	Kiangnan Arsenal	Shanghai	China	For Imperial Chinese Navy.
24 May	Strassburg	Steamship	Messrs. Caird & Co.	Greenock	United Kingdom	For Norddeutscher Lloyd.
25 May	Alethea	Steamship	Withy, Alexander & Co.	Middleton	United Kingdom	For private owner.
25 May	Assyria	Steamship	Messrs. William Simons & Co.	Renfrew	United Kingdom	For British India Steam Navigation Company.
25 May	Gladys	Steamship	Denton, Gray & Co.	West Hartlepool	United Kingdom	For private owner.
25 May	James Mason	Steamship	Messrs. Backhouse & Dixon	Middlesbrough	United Kingdom	For private owner.
Unknown date	Mino	Steamship	Bowdler, Chaffer & Co.	Seacombe	United Kingdom	For Strong, Reid & Page.
29 May	Joseph	Steamship	Denton, Gray & Co.	West Hartlepool	United Kingdom	For private owner.
May	Ark of Safety	Steamship		River Clyde	United Kingdom	For private owner.
May	Asia	Steamship	Messrs. J. & R. Swan	Dumbarton	United Kingdom	For Messrs. Mories, Munro & Co.
May	Bedah	Steam launch	Messrs. J. & R. Swan	Dumbarton	United Kingdom	For Alexander Miller, Brother, & Co.
May	Belle of the Niger	Barque	Messrs. Alexander Stephen & Sons	Linthouse	United Kingdom	For George Eastee.
May	Ben-tan	Steamship	Messrs. J. & G. Thomson	Govan	United Kingdom	For Messrs. Guthrie & Co.
May	Björn	Steamship	William Watson	Sunderland	United Kingdom	For Angfartygs Aktie-Bolaget Thule.
May	Ella Nichol	Barque	John Batchelor, or Batchelor Bros.	Cardiff	United Kingdom	For William Nichol.
May	Eureka	Steamship	Messrs. Blackwood & Dixon	Middlesbrough	United Kingdom	For private owner.
May	Firefly	Steam yacht	C. M'Bride	Port Glasgow	United Kingdom	For A. H. Heywood.
May	Gladys	Steamship	Messrs. Denton, Gray & Co.	West Hartlepool	United Kingdom	For private owner.
May	Malaren	Steamship	Messrs. Dobie & Co.	Govan	United Kingdom	For private owner.
May	Potomac	Steamship	London and Glasgow Engineering and Iron Shipbuilding Co.	Govan	United Kingdom	For private owner.
May	Southampton	Steamboat			United Kingdom	For Isle of Wight Steam Packet Company.
May	Stella	Schooner	Ayr Shipbuilding Co.	Ayr	United Kingdom	For J. & W. Stewart.
May	Wyffern	Steam yacht	Messrs. Seath & Co.	Glasgow / Windermere	United Kingdom	For William Inman. Built at Glasgow, transported in sections to Windermere, reassembled and launched there.
6 June	Aconcagua	Steamship	Messrs. John Elder & Co.	Govan	United Kingdom	For Pacific Steam Navigation Company.
6 June	Circassian	Steamship	Messrs. Robert Steele & Co.	Greenock	United Kingdom	For Messrs. Allan.
6 June	J. J.	Steamship	M. Pearse & Co.	Stockton-on-Tees	United Kingdom	For private owner.
Unknown date	Modwena	Schooner	Bowdler, Chaffer & Co.	Seacombe	United Kingdom	For J. & F. Gretton.
6 June	Rotterdam	Passenger ship	Messrs. Henderson, Coulborn & Co.	Renfrew	United Kingdom	For Nederlandsch-Amerikaanische Stoomvaart Maatschappij.
8 June	Celtic	Oceanic-class ocean liner	Harland and Wolff	Belfast	United Kingdom	For White Star Line.
8 June	R. M. Hunton	Steamship	Messrs. Turnbull & Son	Whitby	United Kingdom	For private owner.
9 June	Lochnagar	Steamship	Messrs. John Duthie & Sons	Footdee	United Kingdom	For private owner.
11 June	Lady Gertrude	Paddle steamer	Messrs. Blackwood & Gordon	Port Glasgow	United Kingdom	For Wemyss Bay Line.
12 June	Sud America	Ocean liner	Wigham Richardson	Newcastle upon Tyne	United Kingdom	For Lavarello Fratelli Fu G.B.
13 June	Coconada	Steamship	Messrs. A. & J. Inglis	Pointhouse	United Kingdom	For British India Steam Navigation Company.
15 June	Peerless	Steamship	Ira Lafrinnier	Cleveland, Ohio	United States	For Lake Superior Line.
21 June	Collingwood	Merchantman	Messrs. Hood & Co.	Aberdeen	United Kingdom	For Messrs. Devitt & Moore.
22 June	Dhoolia	Steamship	T. R. Oswald	Sunderland	United Kingdom	For C. M. Norwood & Co.
22 June	Lady Bute	Schooner	M'Lea	Rothesay	United Kingdom	For Daniel Duncan.
22 June	Monaltrie	Clipper	Messrs. John Humphrey & Co.	Aberdeen	United Kingdom	For Messrs. Richard Common & Co.
22 June	Shamrock	Schooner	Messrs. Walker & Co.	Deptford Green	United Kingdom	For Sir Edward Sullivan.
22 June	St. Hilda	Steamship	Withy, Alexander & Co.	Middleton	United Kingdom	For private owner.
24 June	Nina	Yacht	Ratsey	Cowes	United Kingdom	For Mr. Jessop.
25 June	Courland	Steamship	Messrs. R. Napier & Sons	Govan	United Kingdom	For Messrs. James Currie & Co.
25 June	Otway	Steamship	Messrs. Blackwood & Gordon	Port Glasgow	United Kingdom	For Warrambool Steam Navigation Company.
26 June	Devon	Steamship	Messrs. William Hamilton & Co.	Port Glasgow	United Kingdom	For Commercial Steamship Co.
27 June	Ferry No. 1	Ferry	Harland & Wolff	Belfast	United Kingdom	For Belfast Harbour Commissioners.
June	Nancy	Schooner	Philip Bellot	Gorey	(United Kingdom of Great Britain and Ireland) Jersey	For private owner.
June	Thornton	Schooner	William Cook	Stornoway	United Kingdom	For James Matheson.
2 July	Muriel	Steamship	Messrs. Alexander Stephen & Sons	Linthouse	United Kingdom	For Messrs. Blythe Brothers.
3 July	Lufra	Steamship	Denton, Gray & Co.	West Hartlepool	United Kingdom	For private owner.
6 July	Ada	Fishing boat	E. Robertson	Ipswich	United Kingdom	For Mr. Freshwater.
8 July	Chaldea	Steamship	Messrs. Charles Connell & Co.	Whiteinch	United Kingdom	For British India Steam Navigation Co. (Limited).
8 July	M. Moxham	Steamship	M. Pearse & Co.	Stockton-on-Tees	United Kingdom	For private owner.
9 July	Activ	Steamship	Messra Aitken & Mansel	Whiteinch	United Kingdom	For Dampskibsskelskabet Activ.
9 July	Neapel	Steamship	Messrs. Alexander Stephen & Sons	Linthouse	United Kingdom	For Robert Miles Sloman.
9 July	Antilope	Pétrel-class wheeled aviso	Chantiers et Ateliers Augustin Normand	Le Havre	France	For French Navy
10 July	Marquis of Lorne	Steam launch	Messrs, Camper & Nicholson	Gosport	United Kingdom	For private owner.
13 July	Thornaby	Steamship	Richardson, Duck & Co.	South Stockton	United Kingdom	For private owner.
16 July	Loch Doon	Merchantman	Messrs. William Hamilton & Co.	Port Glasgow	United Kingdom	For Messrs. D. & J. Sproat.
20 July	Seudre	Indre-class transport	Arsenal de Rochefort	Rochefort	France	For French Navy
22 July	Karnak	Steamship	Withy, Alexander & Co.	Middleton	United Kingdom	For private owner.
22 July	William Manson	Brig	Messrs. J. Duthie & Sons	Footdee	United Kingdom	For Messrs. John Fraser & Co.
23 July	Bellona	Steamship	Denton, Gray & Co.	West Hartlepool	United Kingdom	For private owner.
23 July	Bloomhill	Steamship	Messrs. Henry Murray & Co.	Port Glasgow	United Kingdom	For Messrs. H. Andrew & Co.
24 July	Italia	Ocean liner	Messrs. Robert Duncan & Co.	Port Glasgow	United Kingdom	For Anchor Line.
24 July	Vaïco	Steamship	Messrs. John Fullarton & Co	Merksworth	United Kingdom	For George Clark.
25 July	Fidela	Steamship	William Watson	Sunderland	United Kingdom	For Francis C. Fulton.
31 July	Jeddah	Steamship	Messrs. William Denny & Bros.	Dumbarton	United Kingdom	For Messrs. Guthrie & Co.
July	G. A. Pyke	Brigantine		Tatamagouche	Canada	For private owner.
July	Moratin	Steamship	Bowdler, Chaffer & Co.	Seacombe	United Kingdom	For Serapio Acebel y Compagnia.
1 August	Lapland	Steamship	Messrs. Barclay, Curle & Co.	Whiteinch	United Kingdom	For Leith, Hull and Hamburg Shipping Co.
2 August	Bloodhound	Sealer	Alexander Stephen & Sons	Dundee	United Kingdom	For Walter B. Grieve.
5 August	Softwing	Schooner	Messrs. J. Harvey & Co.	Wivenhoe	United Kingdom	For J. M. Courtald.
7 August	Olaveaga	Steamship	Bartram & Haswell	Sunderland	United Kingdom	For Burgess & Co.
7 August	Messina	Steamship	Denton, Gray & Co.	West Hartlepool	United Kingdom	For private owner.
10 August	Abbey Tower	Steamship	Messrs. Dobie & Co.	Govan	United Kingdom	For M. J. Wilson.
15 August	Pennsylvania	Passenger ship	William Cramp & Sons	Philadelphia, Pennsylvania	United States	For American Line.
17 August	Celerity	Steamship	W. Pile & Co.	Sunderland	United Kingdom	For Banks & Mitchell.
19 August	Louisiana	Steamship	Messrs. Thomas Wingate & Co.	Whiteinch	United Kingdom	For Messrs. Lewis T. Merrow & Co Ltd.
19 August	Maas	Steamship	Messrs. Henderson, Coulborn & Co	Renfrew	United Kingdom	For Messsrs. Plate, Reuchline & Co.
20 August	Cid	Steamship	Messrs. Bowdler, Chaffer & Co.	Seacombe	United Kingdom	For Messrs. MacAndrew & Co., of J. Roca y Compagnia.
20 August	Custoza	Ironclad	Stabilimento Tecnico Triestino	Trieste	Austria-Hungary	For Austro-Hungarian Navy.
20 August	Emmy	Steamship	M. Pearse & Co.	Stockton-on-Tees	United Kingdom	For private owner.
20 August	Kenilworth	Steamship	Messrs. Gourlay, Bros., & Co	Renfrew	United Kingdom	For Messrs. Williamson, Milligan & Co.
20 August	Moselle	Steamship	Messrs. Caird & Co.	Greenock	United Kingdom	For Norddeutscher Lloyd.
20 August	Prague	Steamship	Messrs. Barclay, Curle & Co.	Greenock	United Kingdom	For Leith, Hull and Hamburg Steam Packet Company.
20 August	Russia	Lake freighter	King Iron Works	Buffalo, New York	United Kingdom	For Charles Ensign.
20 August	Solunto	Steamship	William Watson	Sunderland	United Kingdom	For La Trinacria Societa di Navigazione a Vapeur.
21 August	John Dixon	Steamship	Messrs. Schlesinger, Davis & Co.	Wallsend	United Kingdom	For Messrs. Kirby & Gillies.
21 August	Texas	Steamship	Messrs. A. M'Millan & Son	Dumbarton	United Kingdom	For Liverpool & Mississippi Steamship Co.
23 August	Prince Edward	Steamship	Messrs. Aitken & Mansel	Whiteinch	United Kingdom	For Messrs. John Pitcairn & Co.
27 August	Petr Veliky	Ironclad	Admiralty Yard	Saint Petersburg	Russia	For Imperial Russian Navy.
28 August	Capron	Steamship		New York City	United States	For Imperial Japanese Government.
August	F. T. Barry	Steamship	Messrs. Backhouse & Dixon	Middlesbrough	United Kingdom	For private owner.
August	Hilda	Steamship	Messrs. Backhouse & Dixon	Middlesbrough	United Kingdom	For private owner.
August	Perseverance	Sloop	T. Tate	Sunderland	United Kingdom	For private owner.
August	Santorin	Steamship	Robert Thompson	Sunderland	United Kingdom	For Robert Todd Nicholson.
3 September	Cecile	Steam yacht	Earle's Shipbuilding & Engineering Co. Ltd.	Hull	United Kingdom	For Lord Paget.
4 September	Glamorgan	Steamship	Messrs. Simon & Co.	Renfrew	United Kingdom	For private owner.
4 September	Hilda	Steamship	Backhouse & Dixon.	Middlesbrough	United Kingdom	For private owner.
5 September	Koning der Nederlanden	Passenger ship	John Elder & Company	Glasgow	United Kingdom	For Stoomvaart Maatschappij Nederland.
5 September	Lady Belhaven	Merchantman	Messrs. John Reid & Co.	Port Glasgow	United Kingdom	For Messrs. Hamilton, Adam & Co.
5 September	Theban	Steamship	Denton, Gray & Co.	West Hartlepool	United Kingdom	For private owner.
7 September	Bylgia	Steamship	William Watson	Sunderland	United Kingdom	For Lastangare A/B Aegir.
7 September	Miguel Saenz	Steamship	Bowdler, Chaffer & Co.	Seacombe	United Kingdom	For Serapio Acebal y Compagnia.
7 September	Mitidjah	Steamship	Robert Thompson	Sunderland	United Kingdom	For Compagnie de Navigation Mixte.
9 September	Economy	Fishing trawler	James Banks	Selby	United Kingdom	For The North Sea Fishing Co. Ltd.
17 September	Queen Elizabeth	Steamship	Messrs. Aitken & Mansel	Whiteinch	United Kingdom	For Queen Steamship Company (Limited).
18 September	Gomos	Steamship	Richardson, Duck & Co.	South Stockton	United Kingdom	For private owner.
18 September	Loch Fleet	Merchantman	Messrs. Dobie & Co.	Govan	United Kingdom	For Messrs. D. & J. Sproat.
18 September	Saxon	Steamship	Messrs. J. & R. Swan	Dumbarton	United Kingdom	For Messrs. John Macfarlane & Co.
18 September	Strauss	Steamship	M. Pearse & Co.	Stockton-on-Tees	United Kingdom	For private owner.
21 September	Gaelic	Passenger and cargo ship	Harland and Wolff	Belfast	United Kingdom	For White Star Line.
21 September	Marguerite	Steamship	Messrs. Murray & Co.	Port Glasgow	United Kingdom	For Messrs. Marquer Frères.
21 September	Penedo	Steamship	Withy, Alexander & Co.	Middleton	United Kingdom	For private owner.
21 September	Quarta	Steamship	Denton, Gray & Co.	West Hartlepool	United Kingdom	For private owner.
22 September	Traffic	Tender	Harland and Wolff	Belfast	United Kingdom	For White Star Line.
23 September	Huddersfield	steamship	John Elder & Co.	Govan	United Kingdom	For Manchester, Sheffield and Lincolnshire Railway.
24 September	Ready	Frolic-class gunvessel		Chatham Dockyard	United Kingdom	For Royal Navy.
30 September	Mary Varwell	Schooner	John Barter & Son	Brixham	United Kingdom	For William Varwell and others.
September	Asiatic	Steamship	Whitehaven Shipbuilding Co.	Whitehaven	United Kingdom	For Union Royal Mail Co.
September	Corcovado	Steamship	Messrs. Laird Bros.	Birkenhead	United Kingdom	For Pacific Steam Navigation Company.
September	Kishon	Barque	J. Gardner	Hylton	United Kingdom	For Richardson & Co.
2 October	Furness Abbey	Steamship	Messrs. M'Fayden & Co.	Port Glasgow	United Kingdom	For North Lonsdale Steamship Company, or Messrs. Mories, Munro & Co.
2 October	Sorata	Steamship	Messrs. John Elder & Co.	Govan	United Kingdom	For Pacific Steam Navigation Company.
3 October	Georgette	Collier	Messrs. M'Kellar, M'Millan & Co.	Dumbarton	United Kingdom	For M. Lowden Jr.
3 October	Java	Steamship	Messrs. A. & J. Inglis	Glasgow	United Kingdom	For British India Steam Navigation Company.
5 October	Norden	Steamship	Messrs. Dobie & Co.	Govan	United Kingdom	For private owner.
7 October	San Jacinto	Steamship	Messrs. Archibald M'Millan & Son	Dumbarton	United Kingdom	For Liverpool and Texas Steamship Co.
8 October	Svend	Steamship	Messrs. Henderson, Coulbourn & Co.	Renfrew	United Kingdom	For Mr. Carl.
13 October	Leitha	Leitha-class river monitor	Újpesti Shipyard	Budapest	Austria-Hungary	For Austro-Hungarian Navy.
17 October	Lottie	Steamship	M. Pearse & Co.	Stockton-on-Tees	United Kingdom	For private owner.
17 October	Carl Christian	Steamship	Backhouse & Dixon.	Middlesbrough	United Kingdom	For private owner.
19 October	Glenlyon	Steamship	London and Glasgow Engineering and Iron Shipbuilding Company (Limited)	Govan	United Kingdom	For Messrs. Allan C. Gow & Co.
19 October	Maggie Douglas	Barque	Messrs. Barr & Shearer	Ardrossan	United Kingdom	For William M'Jannet.
21 October	Pelayo	Steamship	Bowdler, Chaffer & Co.	Seacombe	United Kingdom	For Serapio Acebal y Compagnia.
21 October	Red Rose	Steam yacht	Messrs. Thomas B. Seath & Co.	Rutherglen	United Kingdom	For John Lancaster.
23 October	Dunluce Castle	Steamship	Messrs. J. & R. Swan	Dumbarton	United Kingdom	For Messrs. William and Montgomery Patterson.
26 October	Hansa	Ironclad	Kaiserliche Werft	Danzig	Germany	For Kaiserliche Marine.
28 October	Mukaddeme-i Hayir	Feth-i Bülend-class Ironclad	Imperial Arsenal	Golden Horn	Ottoman Empire	For Ottoman Navy.
30 October	Ohio	Passenger ship	William Cramp & Sons	Philadelphia, Pennsylvania	United States	For American Line.
31 October	Colina	Steamship	Messrs. Barclay, Curle & Co.	Whiteinch	United Kingdom	For Messrs. Donaldson Bros.
October	Annan	Steamship	Davison & Stokoe	Southwick	United Kingdom	For S. J. Glover & Co.
October	Santa Rosa	Steamship	Messrs. Laird Bros.	Birkenhead	United Kingdom	For Pacific Steam Navigation Company.
October	Teluk Mayer	Steamship	Messrs. Jackson & Blake	Northfleet	United Kingdom	For private owner.
October	The Crusader	Steamship	M. Scallan	Ringsend	United Kingdom	For private owner.
2 November	Cortes	Steamship	W. Pile & Co.	Sunderland	United Kingdom	For private owner.
2 November	Penelope	Steamship	Backhouse & Dixon.	Middlesbrough	United Kingdom	For private owner.
2 November	Portsoy	Schooner	Messrs. John Humphrey & Co.	Aberdeen	United Kingdom	For Mr. Baxter and Mr. Robbie.
2 November	Ruthven	Steamship	Messrs. Alexander Hall & Co.	Aberdeen	United Kingdom	For private owner.
5 November	Esbjerg	Steamship	Messrs. Cunliffe & Dunlop	Port Glasgow	United Kingdom	For Esbjerg Dampskibsskelskabet.
5 November	German Empire	Steamship	Denton, Gray & Co.	West Hartlepool	United Kingdom	For West Hartlepool Steam Navigation Co.
5 November	Harrington	Steamship	Messrs. William Hamilton & Co.	Port Glasgow	United Kingdom	For Commercial Steamship Co.
5 November	Minnesota	Steamship	Messrs. Wingate	Whiteinch	United Kingdom	For State Line Steamship Co. (Limited).
6 November	Ibrahimieh	Dredger	Messrs. W. Simons & Co	Renfrew	United Kingdom	For Khedive of Egypt.
6 November	Mallard	Steamship	Messrs. Aitken & Mansel	Kelvinhaugh	United Kingdom	For John C. Aitken.
13 November	Mandalay	Steamship	Messrs. William Denny & Bros.	Dumbarton	United Kingdom	For Messrs. Patrick Henderson & Co.
13 November	Pachino	Steamship	William Watson	Sunderland	United Kingdom	For La Trinacria Societa di Navigazione a Vapeur.
13 November	Pow An	Steamship	Messrs. A. Stephen & Sons	Linthouse	United Kingdom	For private owner.
14 November	Easby	Steamship	Richardson, Duck & Co.	South Stockton	United Kingdom	For private owner.
16 November	Calima	Steamship	builder	Chester, Pennsylvania	United States	For Pacific Steam Navigation Company.
16 November	Don'a Juana	Barque	Messrs. Charles Connell & Co.	Whiteinch	United Kingdom	For private owner.
16 November	Lady Clare	Steamship	Denton, Gray & Co.	West Hartlepool	United Kingdom	For private owner.
16 November	Memphis	Cargo ship	Withy, Alexander & Co	Middlesbrough	United Kingdom	For Cosmos Steam Shipping Co.
16 November	Ponce	Steamship	Bowdler, Chaffer & Co.	Seacombe	United Kingdom	For F. A. de Albizuri.
18 November	Huntcliffe	Steamship	Richardson, Duck & Co.	South Stockton	United Kingdom	For private owner.
18 November	Namaqua	Steamship	Messrs. John Fullarton & Co.	Merksworth	United Kingdom	For private owner.
20 November	Isle of Anglesea	Clipper	Messrs. Dobie & Co	Govan	United Kingdom	For S. Martin.
20 November	Rifleman	Frolic-class gunvessel		Chatham Dockyard	United Kingdom	For Royal Navy.
21 November	Mersey	Steamship	Messrs. Cunliffe & Dunlop	Port Glasgow	United Kingdom	For Messrs. James & Alexander Allan.
23 November	Jarvis Lord	Lake freighter	Morley & Hill	Marine City, Michigan	United States	For John W. Moore & H. H. Brown.
26 November	Acapulco	Steamship		Delaware River	United States	For Pacific Mail Steamship Company.
November	Blende	Cargo ship	William Allsup	Preston	United Kingdom	For Laxey Steam Ship Co.
2 December	Guayacan	Steamship	M. Pearse & Co.	Stockton-on-Tees	United Kingdom	For private owner.
3 December	Nelusko	Steamship	Messrs. Alexander Stephen & Sons	Pointhouse	United Kingdom	For private owner.
3 December	Peloro	Steamship	Messrs. Hanna, Donald & Wilson	Paisley	United Kingdom	For private owner.
4 December	Erna	Steamship	Messrs. John Reid & Co.	Port Glasgow	United Kingdom	For Messrs. Charles Henderson & Co.
5 December	Sandfly	Schooner	John Cuthbert	Millers Point	New South Wales	For Royal Navy.
12 December	Baron Selbourne	Steamship	William Watson	Sunderland	United Kingdom	For James MacCunn & Co.
12 December	Nellie Wise	Steamship	Denton, Gray & Co.	West Hartlepool	United Kingdom	For private owner.
12 December	Odin	Ironclad	Naval Dockyard	Copenhagen	Denmark	For Royal Danish Navy.
14 December	Dunraven	Steamship	C Mitchell & Co.	Newcastle upon Tyne	United Kingdom	For W Milburn.
14 December	Nor	Steamship	Backhouse & Dixon.	Middlesbrough	United Kingdom	For private owner.
14 December	Wimbledon	Steamship	Richardson, Duck & Co.	South Stockton	United Kingdom	For private owner.
16 December	Illimani	Steamship	Messrs. John Elder & Co.	Govan	United Kingdom	For Pacific Steam Navigation Company.
16 December	Luise	Ariadne-class corvette	Kaiserliche Werft	Danzig	Germany	For Kaiserliche Marine.
17 December	America	Steamship	Messrs. J. & R. Swan	Dumbarton	United Kingdom	For Black Diamond Line.
17 December	Castalia	Steamship	Messrs. Charles Connell & Co.	Whiteinch	United Kingdom	For Messrs. Handyside & Henderson.
17 December	Halifax	Steamship	John Elder & Co.	Govan	United Kingdom	For Manchester, Sheffield and Lincolnshire Railway.
17 December	Marienburg	Steamship	J. G. Lawrie	Whiteinch	United Kingdom	For Danzig Shipping Co.
17 December	Simeto	Steamship	Messrs. Archibald M'Millan & Son	Dumbarton	United Kingdom	For Trinacria Steamship Company.
18 December	Bokhara	Passenger ship	Caird & Company	Greenock	United Kingdom	For Peninsular and Oriental Steam Navigation Company.
18 December	Zephyt	Ariel-class gunboat		Chatham Dockyard	United Kingdom	For Royal Navy.
20 December	Broomside	Steamship	Alfred Simey & Co	Sunderland	United Kingdom	For H. T. Morton.
26 December	Suffren	Océan-class ironclad	Arsenal de Cherbourg	Cherbourg	France	For French Navy.
28 December	Vanguard	Steamship	Messrs. Alexander Hall & Co.	Footdee	United Kingdom	For Messrs. Punton & Mun.
30 December	Leopard	Steamship	Ayr Shipbuilding Co.	Ayr	United Kingdom	For Walter Grieve, Son, & Co.
30 December	Neptune	Whaler	Messrs. A. Stephen & Sons	Dundee	United Kingdom	For Messrs. Job Bros.
30 December	Santiago	Steamship	Messrs. Tod & MacGregor	Partick	United Kingdom	For Ryde Line.
30 December	Venetia	Steamship	Messrs. William Denny & Bros.	Dumbarton	United Kingdom	For Peninsular and Oriental Steam Navigation Company.
31 December	African	Steamship		Kinghorn	United Kingdom	For Union Mail Steam Navigation Company.
31 December	King Ermyn	Steamship	M. Pearse & Co.	Stockton-on-Tees	United Kingdom	For Messrs. G. T. Harper & Co.
31 December	San Antonió	Steamship	Messrs. Archibald M'Millan & Sons	Dumbarton	United Kingdom	For Liverpool and Texas Steamship Co.
December	Beagle	Beagle-class schooner	John Cuthbert	Millers Point	New South Wales	For Royal Navy.
December	Montana	Steamship			United Kingdom	For private owner.
Summer	Clarisse	Cutter	Mr. Fife	Fairlie	United Kingdom	For Lord Henry Lennox.
Unknown date	Acadian	Merchantman	John Denniston	Sunderland	United Kingdom	For Allan Bros.
Unknown date	Alonzo	Steamship			United Kingdom	For Messrs. Leetham Bros.
Unknown date	Alpha	Steamship	Edward Lindsay	Newcastle upon Tyne	United Kingdom	For Messrs. R. Fell, Jr., & Co.
Unknown date	Advance	Schooner	Thomas Davis	Terrigal	New South Wales	For Cairncross & Rooke.
Unknown date	Alice Otto	Merchantman	T. R. Oswald	Sunderland	United Kingdom	For George Otto.
Unknown date	Ambassador	Merchantman	James Laing	Sunderland	United Kingdom	For T. & J. Harrison.
Unknown date	Amboto	Merchantman	T. R. Oswald	Sunderland	United Kingdom	For Yturriaga & Co.
Unknown date	Antenor	Cargo ship	Hawthorn Leslie and Company	Hebburn-on-Tyne	United Kingdom	For Ocean Steam Ship Company.
Unknown date	Arbitrator	Merchantman	Davison & Stokoe	Southwick	United Kingdom	For T. & J. Harrison.
Unknown date	Ardmore	Merchantman	Bartram & Haswell	Sunderland	United Kingdom	For Ross & Co.
Unknown date	Argyle	Steamship	Messrs. Gilbert & Cooper	Hull	United Kingdom	For Messrs. Bailey & Leetham.
Unknown date	Almeria	Steamship	Osbourne, Graham & Co.	Sunderland	United Kingdom	Built on speculation. Subsequently sold to J. Hunter.
Unknown date	Argentino	Merchantman	W. Pile & Co.	Sunderland	United Kingdom	For River Parana Steam Ship Co.
Unknown date	Aristocrat	Merchantman	William Doxford	Sunderland	United Kingdom	For Thomas Day & Co., or Day & Farlan.
Unknown date	Benton	Merchantman	William Doxford	Sunderland	United Kingdom	For Hindhaugh & Co.
Unknown date	Beulah	Merchantman	James Laing	Sunderland	United Kingdom	For J. F. Middleton & Co.
Unknown date	Bewick	Merchantman	William Doxford	Sunderland	United Kingdom	For Joseph Heald.
Unknown date	Borthwick	Merchantman	Joseph L. Thompson	Sunderland	United Kingdom	For Michael Murphy.
Unknown date	Brighton	Merchantman	Blumer & Co.	Sunderland	United Kingdom	For Commercial Steam Shipping Co. Ltd.
Unknown date	Buenos Aires	Merchantman	James Laing	Sunderland	United Kingdom	For Hamburg Südamerikanische Dampfschiffahrts-Gesellschaft.
Unknown date	Buitron	Merchantman	Joseph L. Thompson	Sunderland	United Kingdom	For John Tully & Co.
Unknown date	Burlington	Merchantman	William Doxford	Sunderland	United Kingdom	For Glove & Steel.
Unknown date	Catarina Sevastopulo	Barque	W. H. Pearson	Sunderland	United Kingdom	For Mr. Sevastopulo.
Unknown date	Charity	Merchantman	J. Gardner	Sunderland	United Kingdom	For J. Smith.
Unknown date	Charlaw	Steamship	Robert Thompson	Sunderland	United Kingdom	For private owner.
Unknown date	Charles Albert	Steamship	Blumer & Co.	Sunderland	United Kingdom	For Huart & Cie.
Unknown date	Chillingham Castle	Steamship	Osborne, Graham & Co. Ltd	Sunderland	United Kingdom	For J. Hall.
Unknown date	City of Dublin	Steamship			United Kingdom	For private owner.
Unknown date	City of Waterford	Merchantman	William Doxford	Sunderland	United Kingdom	For D. Carigan.
Unknown date	Coanwood	Merchantman	Osbourne, Graham & Co.	Sunderland	United Kingdom	For Alex Dick.
Unknown date	Colomba	Steamship	James Laing	Sunderland	United Kingdom	For Porteous & Senier.
Unknown date	Colombo	Steamship	Messrs. Humphrys & Pearson	Hull	United Kingdom	For Messrs. Thomas Wilson, Sons, & Co.
Unknown date	Consett	Merchantman	G. Short	Sunderland	United Kingdom	For H. T. Morton.
Unknown date	Coromandel	Merchantman	W. Pile & Co.	Sunderland	United Kingdom	For J. & J. Wait.
Unknown date	Dawn	Steamship	Messrs. Humphrys & Pearson	Hull	United Kingdom	For private owner.
Unknown date	Daybreak	Steamship	Messrs. Humphrys & Pearson	Hull	United Kingdom	For private owner.
Unknown date	Delta	Steamship			United Kingdom	For Messrs. Smith, Hill & Co.
Unknown date	Democrat	Merchantman	William Doxford	Sunderland	United Kingdom	For Day & Farlan.
Unknown date	Don Mariano	Steamship	Backhouse & Dixon.	Middlesbrough	United Kingdom	For private owner.
Unknown date	Dorcas	Merchantman	W. Pile & Co.	Sunderland	United Kingdom	For A. Smith and partners.
Unknown date	Eagle	Barque	J. Crown	Sunderland	United Kingdom	For C. Hodgson.
Unknown date	Edith	Steam trawler	George Bidder	Dartmouth	United Kingdom	For private owner.
Unknown date	Edward & Esther	Fishing trawler	John Banks Jr.	Kilpin Pike	United Kingdom	For Edward Cornell.
Unknown date	Edward Eccles	Merchantman	G. Short	Sunderland	United Kingdom	For E. Eccles & Co.
Unknown date	Elizabeth Taylor	Merchantman	William Pickersgill	Sunderland	United Kingdom	For T. Seed.
Unknown date	Eliza Hunting	Merchantman	W. Pile & Co.	Sunderland	United Kingdom	For A. Strong.
Unknown date	Emerald	Merchantman	G. Short	Sunderland	United Kingdom	For R. Weatherley & Co.
Unknown date	Emma	Steamship	builder	Sunderland	United Kingdom	For C. Wachter.
Unknown date	Ennerdale	Merchantman	G. Short	Sunderland	United Kingdom	For Milburn Bros.
Unknown date	Envoy	Steamship	Messrs. Gilbert & Cooper	Hull	United Kingdom	For Messrs. Gee & Co.
Unknown date	Ernst Moritz Arndt	Steamship	T. R. Oswald	Sunderland	United Kingdom	For Baltischer Lloyd.
Unknown date	Ethel	Yacht	John Cuthbert	Millers Point	New South Wales	For private owner.
Unknown date	Eunice	Steamship	W. Pile & Co	Sunderland	United Kingdom	For Thomas G. Greenwell and partners.
Unknown date	Fenris	John Ericsson-class monitor	Motala Verkstad	Norrköping	Sweden	For Royal Swedish Navy.
Unknown date	F. T. Barry	Steamship	Backhouse & Dixon.	Middlesbrough	United Kingdom	For private owner.
Unknown date	Gamma	Steamship	Messrs. Humphrys & Pearson	Hull	United Kingdom	For Messrs. Smith, Hill & Co.
Unknown date	George Booth	Merchantman	William Pickersgill	Sunderland	United Kingdom	For T. Seed.
Unknown date	George Elliot	Steamship	Robert Thompson	Sunderland	United Kingdom	For William S. Hunter and Henry S. Pringle.
Unknown date	Georgian	Merchantman	James Laing	Sunderland	United Kingdom	For John Lacy.
Unknown date	German Emperor	Merchantman	G. Short	Sunderland	United Kingdom	For J. S. Barwick & Co.
Unknown date	Gilston	Merchantman	Blumer & Co.	Sunderland	United Kingdom	For J. D. Hill & Co.
Unknown date	Gjøa	Sloop	Knut Johannesson Skaale	Rosendal	Norway	For private owner.
Unknown date	Goldfinch	Steam yacht	William Allsup	Preston	United Kingdom	For private owner.
Unknown date	Gomes	Steamship			United Kingdom	For H. Briggs.
Unknown date	Graphic	Steamship	Messrs. Alexander Hall & Co.	Aberdeen	United Kingdom	For private owner.
Unknown date	Great Western	Steamship	W. Pile & Co.	Sunderland	United Kingdom	For Great Western Steamship Line.
Unknown date	Gunga	Steamship			United Kingdom	For Messrs. Rawson & Robinson.
Unknown date	Hadji	Steamship	Iliff & Mounsey	Sunderland	United Kingdom	For Quebec and Gulf Ports Steamship Co. Ltd.
Unknown date	Hamburg	Steamship	Messrs. Humphrys & Pearson	Hull	United Kingdom	For private owner.
Unknown date	Harrier	Schooner		Cowes	United Kingdom	For private owner.
Unknown date	Harold Haarfanger	Steamship	Messrs. Backhouse & Dixon	Middlesbrough	United Kingdom	For private owner.
Unknown date	Harry S. Edwards	Merchantman	Iliff & Mounsey	Sunderland	United Kingdom	For H. S. Edwards.
Unknown date	Harton	Merchantman	Blumer & Co.	Sunderland	United Kingdom	For H. Philipson.
Unknown date	Hekla	Barque	Jørgensen & Knudsen	Drammen	Norway	For S. S. Svendsen.
Unknown date	Helens	Barque	J. Gardner	Sunderland	United Kingdom	For J. Smith.
Unknown date	Henry Scholefield	Merchantman	Joseph L. Thompson	Sunderland	United Kingdom	For John Tully & Co.
Unknown date	Hercules	Clipper			United Kingdom	For Messrs. Houlder, Bros. & Co.
Unknown date	Herman Edgar	Merchantman	A. Simey & Co.	Sunderland	United Kingdom	For Henry E. Fry & Co.
Unknown date	Hidalgo	Steamship			United Kingdom	For Messrs Thomas Wilson, Sons, & Co.
Unknown date	Hilda	Steamship	Messrs. Gilbert & Cooper	Hull	United Kingdom	For Messrs. Grotrian & Co.
Unknown date	Hindoo	Steamship			United Kingdom	For Messrs Thomas Wilson, Sons, & Co.
Unknown date	Iron Mountain	Stern-wheeler		Pittsburgh, Pennsylvania	United States	For Mound City Ice Company.
Unknown date	Jeddah	Steamship	William Denny and Brothers	Dumbarton	United Kingdom	For Singapore Steamship Company.
Unknown date	John Adamson	Steamship	Short Bros.	Sunderland	United Kingdom	For John Westoll Line.
Unknown date	Joinville	Barque	J. Goill	Sunderland	United Kingdom	For Briandau & Cie.
Unknown date	José Baro	Merchantman	T. R. Oswald	Sunderland	United Kingdom	For L. Soler y Cia.
Unknown date	Jovellanos	Steamship	Bowdler, Chaffer & Co.	Seacombe	United Kingdom	For Serapio Acebal y Compagnia.
Unknown date	Knight Templar	Steamship	J. G. Lawrie	Whiteinch	United Kingdom	For Messrs. Baird & Brown.
Unknown date	Khedive	Steamship	Samuda Brothers	Poplar / Gondokoro	United Kingdom / (Ottoman Empire) Turco-Egyptian Sudan	For Samuel Baker.
Unknown date	Kung Ring	Merchantman	J. Denniston	Sunderland	United Kingdom	For Angfartygs A/B Thule.
Unknown date	Lequeirio	Steamship	G. Short	Sunderland	United Kingdom	For Roman de Anduiza.
Unknown date	Lestris	Merchantman	Joseph L. Thompson	Sunderland	United Kingdom	For Cork Steamship Co.
Unknown date	Libeo	Merchantman	W. Pile & Co	Sunderland	United Kingdom	For Societa de Navigazione à Vapeur La Trinacria.
Unknown date	Lise	Merchantman	Iliff & Mounsey	Sunderland	United Kingdom	For Edward T. Gourley.
Unknown date	Livadia	Royal yacht	Leopold Schwede	Nikolaev	Russia	For Alexander II.
Unknown date	Live Oak	Barque	J. & J. Gibbon	Sunderland	United Kingdom	For H. Egglestone.
Unknown date	Ljubidrag	Merchantman	W. Richardson	Sunderland	United Kingdom	For Mr. Bielovucich.
Unknown date	Lumley	Steamship	Blumer & Co,	Sunderland	United Kingdom	For H. T. Morton & Co.
Unknown date	Luneburg	Merchantman	G. Short	Sunderland	United Kingdom	For H. T. Morton & Co.
Unknown date	Malpas Belle	Brigantine	Nicholas Scoble	Truro	United Kingdom	For private owner.
Unknown date	Mandingo	Steamship			United Kingdom	For Messrs Rawson & Robinson.
Unknown date	Marcasite	Steamship	Blumer & Co	Sunderland	United Kingdom	For J. H. W. Culliford & Co.
Unknown date	Maria Louisa	Merchantman	Osbourne, Graham & Co.	Sunderland	United Kingdom	For private owner.
Unknown date	Marion	Merchantman	Bluer & Co.	Sunderland	United Kingdom	For H. Ellis & Son.
Unknown date	Marqués de Núñez	Merchantman	W. Pile & Co	Sunderland	United Kingdom	For Olavarria & Lozano.
Unknown date	Maude	Paddle steamer	Joseph Spratt	San Juan Island	(United States) Washington Territory	For Canadian National Steamship Company.
Unknown date	Mecca	Merchantman	Osbourne, Graham & Co	Sunderland	United Kingdom	For R. M. Hudson & Partners.
Unknown date	Minnie Breslauer	Merchantman	R. Iliff	Sunderland	United Kingdom	For R. Breslauer & Co.
Unknown date	Mistletoe	Lighthouse tender	Robinson Hoffmand & Co	Chester, Pennsylvania	United States	For United States Lighthouse Service.
Unknown date	Mont Cenis	Steamship	Backhouse & Dixon.	Middlesbrough	United Kingdom	For private owner.
Unknown date	Moorsley	Merchantman	James Laing	Sunderland	United Kingdom	For R. Sharp.
Unknown date	Mosel	Mail steamer	Caird & Company	Greenock	Germany	
Unknown date	Nahunta	Barge	Aitken & Mansel	Glasgow	United Kingdom	For private owner.
Unknown date	Newbiggin	Steamship	W. Pile & Co.	Sunderland	United Kingdom	For Geoffrey Robison Dawson.
Unknown date	Newfoundland	Steamship	Peter Baldwin	Quebec	(United Kingdom of Great Britain and Ireland) Canada	For Allan Line.
Unknown date	Niagara	Tug	Detroit Dry Dock Company	Detroit, Michigan	United States	For private owner.
Unknown date	Nio	Steamship	James Laing	Sunderland	United Kingdom	For D. G. Pinkney.
Unknown date	Noquebay	Schooner		Trenton, Michigan	United States	For T H Madden.
Unknown date	Normanby	Merchantman	T. R. Oswald	Sunderland	United Kingdom	For E. Pope.
Unknown date	Nuphar	Merchantman	Iliff & Mounsey	Sunderland	United Kingdom	For Robinson & Co.
Unknown date	Olivet	Merchantman	Robert Thompson	Sunderland	United Kingdom	For Davison & Co.
Unknown date	Pedro J. Pidal	Steamship	W. Pile & Co	Sunderland	United Kingdom	For Oscar de Olivarria & Cia., or Olavarria y Lozand.
Unknown date	Perseverance	Barge	Thomas Brassey & Co.	Birkenhead	United Kingdom	For Mersey Docks and Harbour Board.
Unknown date	Peter Jepsen	Steamship	Backhouse & Dixon.	Middlesbrough	United Kingdom	For private owner.
Unknown date	Queen Victoria	Merchantman	Iliff & Mounsey	Sunderland	United Kingdom	For Queen Steamship Co.
Unknown date	Ravensworth Castle	Merchantman	W. Pile & Co	Sunderland	United Kingdom	For Northumberland Steam Shipping Co.
Unknown date	Red Sea	Merchantman	Joseph L. Thompson	Sunderland	United Kingdom	For Dent & Co.
Unknown date	Regalia	Merchantman	G. Short	Sunderland	United Kingdom	For J. Hall & Co.
Unknown date	Reindeer	Steamship	R. Iliff	Sunderland	United Kingdom	For Cory, Lohden & Co.
Unknown date	Rímac	Cargo ship	R & J Evans & Co	Liverpool	United Kingdom	For Compagñía Sudamericana de Vapores.
Unknown date	Rinaldo	Steamship			United Kingdom	For Messrs Thomas Wilson, Sons, & Co.
Unknown date	Roma	Merchantman	William Pile	Sunderland	United Kingdom	For Lloyd Italiano.
Unknown date	Royal Minstrel	Steamship	William Pile	Sunderland	United Kingdom	For E. Shotton & Co.
Unknown date	Rubens	Steamship	Iliff & Mounsey	Sunderland	United Kingdom	For Lamport & Holt.
Unknown date	Saint Andrew	Steamship	Davison & Stokoe	Sunderland	United Kingdom	For George Jinman & Co.
Unknown date	Sam Weller	Merchantman	William Pile	Sunderland	United Kingdom	For G. Bell & Co.
Unknown date	Sandringham	Steamship	Messrs. Backhouse & Dixon	Middlesbrough	United Kingdom	For private owner.
Unknown date	Savernake	Merchantman	T. R. Oswald	Sunderland	United Kingdom	For La Trinacria Societa di Navigazione a Vapeur.
Unknown date	Serantes	Merchantman	A. Simey & Co.	Sunderland	United Kingdom	For Johnson & Co.
Unknown date	Shamrock	Steamship	Robert Thompson	Sunderland	United Kingdom	For George Jinman & Co.
Unknown date	Shamrock	Tug	Robert Bretland, or Bretland & Angel	Liverpool	United Kingdom	For Thomas Miller.
Unknown date	Silbury	Merchantman	Iliff & Mounsey	Sunderland	United Kingdom	For Charles J. Fox.
Unknown date	Silistria	Merchantman	James Laing	Sunderland	United Kingdom	For R. T. Nicholson.
Unknown date	South	Merchantman	Blumer & Co	Sunderland	United Kingdom	For Mersey Steamship Co.
Unknown date	Steady	Steamship			United Kingdom	For T. H. Lyon.
Unknown date	Stephenson	Steamship	Messrs. Gilbert & Cooper	Hull	United Kingdom	For Messrs. Moran & Co.
Unknown date	Surfit	Steamship	Messrs. Humphrys & Pearson	Hull	United Kingdom	For private owner.
Unknown date	Tabor	Merchantman	g. short	Sunderland	United Kingdom	For J. Westoll.
Unknown date	Theotonio	Steamship	Messrs. Humphrys & Pearson	Hull	United Kingdom	For private owner.
Unknown date	Thor	Thor-class monitor	Horten Navy Yard	Horten	Norway	For Royal Norwegian Navy.
Unknown date	Torino	Merchantman	T. R. Oswald	Sunderland	United Kingdom	For Lloyd Italiano.
Unknown date	Toronto	Steamship	Robert Thompson	Sunderland	United Kingdom	For James Henry Wood Culliford.
Unknown date	Ulleswater	Steamship	William Doxford	Sunderland	United Kingdom	For Strachan & Co.
Unknown date	Urania	Steamship			United Kingdom	For private owner.
Unknown date	Vanessa	Steamship	Messrs. Palmer & Co.	Jarrow	United Kingdom	For private owner.
Unknown date	Vega	Steamship		Bremerhaven	Germany	For private owner
Unknown date	Ventnor	Merchantman	William Doxford	Sunderland	United Kingdom	For J. Hill.
Unknown date	Vesta	Merchantman	Iliff & Mounsey	Sunderland	United Kingdom	For R. H. Penney.
Unknown date	Vick and Mebane	Merchantman	William Pickersgill	Sunderland	United Kingdom	For T. Seed.
Unknown date	Wensleydale	Steamship	Robert Thompson	Sunderland	United Kingdom	For E. & S. Milburn.
Unknown date	Westella	Steamship	Davison & Stokoe	Sunderland	United Kingdom	For Jackson & Beaumont, or Hornstedt & Garthorne.
Unknown date	Westminster	Merchantman	T. R. Oswald	Sunderland	United Kingdom	For George G. Dale.
Unknown date	West Riding	Merchantman	William Doxford	Sunderland	United Kingdom	For Pope & Pearson.
Unknown date	William Brocklebank	Schooner	John & William Brocklebank	Ulverston	United Kingdom	For William Brocklebank.
Unknown date	William Dawson	Merchantman	A. Simer & Co	Sunderland	United Kingdom	For W. Dawson.
Unknown date	Yapura	Yavari-class gunboat	Thames Ironworks and Shipbuilding Company	Leamouth	United Kingdom	For Peruvian Navy.
Unknown date	York	Steamship			United Kingdom	For Wilson Line.
Unknown date	Zeus	Merchantman	Bartram & Haswell	Sunderland	United Kingdom	For C. J. Brightwell & Clo.
Unknown date	Zanzibar	Steamship	T. R. Oswald	Sunderland	United Kingdom	For Union Steamship Co. Ltd.
