= Talisman (disambiguation) =

A talisman is an object which is purported to possess certain magical properties.

Talisman or Talismán may also refer to:

== Arts and entertainment ==
=== Fictional characters ===
- Talisman (Alpha Flight), a comic book superhero
- Talisman, a character in video game Ace Combat 6: Fires of Liberation
- Talisman (Sailor Moon)

=== Film and television ===
- Talisman, a 1995 re-release of the 1987 Italian film Cross of the Seven Jewels
- "The Talisman", an episode of Strange Experiences
- "Talisman", a 2004 episode of TV series Smallville (season 3)

=== Literature ===
- Talisman (book series), a 2005 series of children's novels by Allan Frewin Jones
- Talisman: Sacred Cities, Secret Faith, a 2004 non-fiction book by Graham Hancock and Robert Bauval
- The Talisman (Scott novel), an 1825 historical novel by Sir Walter Scott
- The Talisman (King and Straub novel), a 1984 fantasy novel by Stephen King and Peter Straub
  - The Talisman (comics), a comic book adaptation of the King and Straub novel
- "The Talisman", a 1949 short story by Nadine Gordimer from the collection The Soft Voice of the Serpent

=== Music ===
- Talisman (band), a Swedish rock band
  - Talisman (Talisman album), 1990
- Talisman (Alastair Galbraith album), 1995
- "Talisman", a song by Air from the 1998 album Moon Safari
- "The Talisman", a song by Iron Maiden from the 2010 album The Final Frontier
- Stanford Talisman, an a cappella group from Stanford University
- Talismán, a 2010 musical composition by Juan María Solare
- "Talisman", a song by The Guess Who from their 1970 album American Woman

=== Stage works ===
- The Talisman (ballet), premiered in 1889
- Der Talisman, an 1840 play by Johann Nestroy
- Der Talisman, an 1877 by Prince George of Prussia
- Der Talisman, an 1892 fantasy play by German Ludwig Fulda
- Der Talisman, a 1910 opera by Adela Maddison

=== Other uses in arts and entertainment ===
- The Talisman (painting), by Paul Sérusier, 1888
- Talisman, an adventure board game produced by Games Workshop.
  - Talisman (video game), several adaptations

== People ==
- Arturo Beristain (born 1949), ring name Talismán, Mexican professional wrestler
- Máscara Mágica II (born 1970), ring name Talismán Jr, Mexican professional wrestler

== Places ==
- Bab al-Talsim, one of the old gates of Baghdad
- Talismán, Chiapas, a locality of Tuxtla Chico, Mexico
- Talismán metro station, in Mexico City
- Talismán, a stop on Mexico City Metrobús Line 5
- Talisman, a closed resort in Beaver Valley (Ontario), Canada

== Transportation ==
- Talisman (ship), the name of several ships
  - HMS Talisman
- Talisman UUV, an unmanned mini-sub
- Talisman, a version of the Cadillac Sixty Special automobile
- Renault Talisman, a mid-size sedan built since 2015

== Other uses ==
- Talisman (gastropod), a genus of sea snails
- Talisman Energy, a Canadian independent petroleum company
- Talisman Centre, now MNP Community & Sport Centre, in Calgary, Alberta
- Microsoft Talisman, 3D graphics architecture

== See also ==
- Talisman of Charlemagne, a 9th-century Carolingian reliquary encolpion
