= Talisman (ship) =

Numerous vessels have borne the name Talisman, including:

- French aviso Talisman, launched for the French navy at Le Havre in 1862 and also used as an oceanographical survey ship
- Talisman (1864), built as American Civil War blockade runner
- Talisman (1896), a Clyde paddle steamer that served the railway companies until 1934
- HMS Louis (1913), a destroyer originally named HMS Talisman but renamed Louis while under construction
- HMS Talisman (1915), one of four Talisman-class destroyers, taken over by the Royal Navy during the First World War
- DEPV Talisman, a Clyde paddle vessel that served the railway companies until 1967
- HMS Talisman (N78), a submarine commissioned in 1940 and sunk in 1942
- Talisman UUV, an autonomous unmanned mini-sub, launched in 2004
- Two steamboats Talisman associated with Abraham Lincoln and his home at New Salem, Illinois which were built in 1832 and 1961
- Talismán (ship), an iron hull ship transport of the Peruvian Navy built in Glasgow that served during the War of the Pacific (1879–1883)

== See also ==
- HMS Talisman, the name of more than one ship of the Royal Navy
- Talisman UUV, a fully autonomous unmanned mini-sub
