= Il talismano =

Il talismano (Italian: The talisman) may refer to:

- Il talismano della felicità, cookbook by Ada Boni 1929
- Il talismano (it) opera by Salieri, commedia per musica in 3 acts by Goldoni, revised by Da Ponte
- Il talismano (Pacini), opera by Giovanni Pacini 1832
- Il talismano (Balfe), Italian opera by Michael William Balfe, originally written as an English opera, completed by Michael Costa, June 11, 1874, at Drury Lane in London

== See also ==
- Talisman (disambiguation)
