= List of shipwrecks in February 1876 =

The list of shipwrecks in February 1876 includes ships sunk, foundered, grounded, or otherwise lost during February 1876.

== 1 February ==
List of shipwrecks: 1 February 1876
Ship	State	Description
Dalecarlia	United Kingdom	The ship departed from Calcutta, India for London. No further trace, posted missing.
Glendale	United Kingdom	The steamship ran aground in the Great Bitter Lake.
Hibernia	United Kingdom	The steamship ran aground in the Farne Islands, Northumberland. She was refloated and taken into Lindisfarne, Northumberland, where she ran aground and became waterlogged. She was on a voyage from Dundee, Forfarshire to London or vice versa. She broke in two on 5 February and was a total loss.
Javad	Ottoman Empire	The steamship was wrecked at Jeddah, Hejaz Vilayet. She was on a voyage from Jeddah to the Persian Gulf.
North Sea Queen	United Kingdom	The ship caught fire in Mabroy Bay and was scuttled. She was on a voyage from Londonderry to Burtonport, County Donegal.
Susan	New Zealand	The 17-ton schooner went ashore on Waiheke Island when her cable parted. She became a total wreck.

== 2 February ==
List of shipwrecks: 2 February 1876
Ship	State	Description
Amity	United Kingdom	The brig ran aground on the Bally Edmond Bank, in the Carlingford Lough.
Borthwick	United Kingdom	The steamship ran aground on the North Bank, in Dublin Bay. She was on a voyage from Rotterdam, South Holland, Netherlands to Dublin.
Danzig	Germany	The ship ran aground on Nordstoe. She was on a voyage from Leith, Lothian, United Kingdom to Danzig. She had been refloated by 8 February with the assistance of a tug and resumed her voyage.
Gezina	Germany	The ship sprang a leak and was beached at North Sunderland, Northumberland, United Kingdom. She was on a voyage from Geestemünde to Grangemouth, Stirlingshire, United Kingdom.
Mimosa	Netherlands	The steamship was driven ashore in the Nieuwe Diep. She was on a voyage from Rotterdam, South Holland to Hamburg, Germany.

== 4 February ==
List of shipwrecks: 4 February 1876
Ship	State	Description
Dunluce Castle	United Kingdom	The steamship collided with the steamship Fitzmaurice (United Kingdom) and sank in the North Sea 4 nautical miles (7.4 km) south by west of the Corton Lightship ( Trinity House). Her crew were rescued by Fitzmaurice.
Surprise	United States	The clipper ran aground and was wrecked on the Plymouth Rocks, off Nagasaki, Japan. Her crew survived. She was on a voyage from New York to Yokohama, Japan.

== 5 February ==
List of shipwrecks: 5 February 1876
Ship	State	Description
Ariel	United Kingdom	The steamship ran aground off the coast of Haiti. She was on a voyage from Liverpool, Lancashire to Port-au-Prince, Haiti. She was refloated.
Granada	United Kingdom	The East Indiaman departed from Java, Netherlands East Indies for Queenstown, County Cork. No further trace, presumed foundered with the loss of all sixteen crew.
Howsang	Qing dynasty	The ship caught fire at Shanghai and was scuttled.
Radiant	United Kingdom	The ship departed from Calcutta, India for New York. No further trace, presumed foundered with the loss of all 35 crew.
Silence	United Kingdom	The ship was destroyed by fire at Maceió, Brazil.
Simpson	United Kingdom	The steamship ran aground at Bürener. She was on a voyage from Bremerhaven to Bremen, Germany.
Venus	Norway	The schooner was driven ashore and wrecked at Vila Nova de Milfontes, Portugal. Her crew were rescued.

== 6 February ==
List of shipwrecks: 6 February 1876
Ship	State	Description
Buenos Aires	Germany	The steamship ran aground in the Elbe at Schulau. She was on a voyage form Hamburg to Brazil.
Emily	United Kingdom	The barque was wrecked on the South Gar, off the mouth of the River Tees. Her eighteen crew were rescued by the Redcar Lifeboat Burton-on-Trent and the West Hartlepool Lifeboat Foresters' Pride (both Royal National Lifeboat Institution). Emily was on a voyage from South Shields, County Durham to Cartagena, Spain.
Titania	Denmark	The ship ran aground on the Lysegrund. Her crew were rescued. She was on a voyage from Philadelphia, Pennsylvania, United States to Copenhagen. She floated off and drifted out to sea.
W. J. Hatfield	United States	The full-rigged ship was abandoned in the Atlantic Ocean with the loss of all but four of her 26 or 27 crew. Survivors were rescued by the barque Flooka (Norway). G. W. Hatfield was on a voyage from Philadelphia, Pennsylvania, to Bremerhaven, Germany.

== 7 February ==
List of shipwrecks: 7 February 1876
Ship	State	Description
Acton	United Kingdom	The steamship ran aground at Maassluis, South Holland. She was refloated on 9 February with the assistance of a tug.

== 9 February ==
List of shipwrecks: 9 February 1876
Ship	State	Description
Arthur L.	Canada	The schooner was abandoned in the Atlantic Ocean with the loss of her captain. Her crew were rescued by the barque Aquilla (Italy). Arthur L was on a voyage from Boston, Massachusetts, United States to Barbados.
Auxiliary	United Kingdom	The barque was abandoned in the Atlantic Ocena (39°37′N 34°37′W). Her crew were rescued by Blanche and Louisa (United Kingdom). Auxilar was on a voyage from East Pascagoula, Mississippi, United States to Saint-Nazaire, Ille-et-Vilaine, France.
Lady McDonald	United Kingdom	The barque was driven ashore and wrecked at Port Elizabeth, Cape Colony. Her crew were rescued. She was on a voyage from London to Port Elizabeth.
Prince of Wales	United Kingdom	The tug suffered a boiler explosion and sank in the River Medway with the loss of two of her crew.

== 10 February ==
List of shipwrecks: 10 February 1876
Ship	State	Description
Eugene Mathilde	France	The ship foundered off A Coruña, Spain. Her crew were rescued. She was on a voyage from Marseille, Bouches-du-Rhône to Nantes, Loire-Inférieure.
Hiram	United Kingdom	The ship was driven ashore and wrecked on Ameland, Friesland, Netherlands. Her crew survived. She was on a voyage from Ystad, Sweden to London.

== 11 February ==
List of shipwrecks: 11 February 1876
Ship	State	Description
Angharad	United Kingdom	The ship was towed into Milford Haven, Pembrokeshire in a sinking condition. She was on a voyage from Port Madoc, Caernarfonshire to Newcastle upon Tyne, Northumberland.
Lancashire	United Kingdom	The Mersey Ferry struck the landing stage at Liverpool, Lancashire and was severely damaged.

== 12 February ==
List of shipwrecks: 12 February 1876
Ship	State	Description
Joannis	Greece	The brig named Joannis (and not Giovanni according to some sources) on voyage from Taganrog to Amsterdam wrecked and shattered at Noorderhaaks, the Netherlands. The crew was rescued. In October 1876 the Dutch rescue workers received 250 Guilder that was sent from an unknown person from the East Indies.
Ardeer, and Marquis of Lorne	United Kingdom	The steamships collided off Whitehaven, Cumberland and were both severely damaged. They put into Whitehaven. Ardeer was on a voyage from Whitehaven to Ardrossan, Ayrshire. Marquis of Lorne was on a voyage from Dublin to Maryport, Cumberland.
Astarte	United Kingdom	The steamship ran aground on the Hittarp Reef, in the Baltic Sea. She was refloated on 14 February and taken into Helsingør, Denmark.
Rose	United Kingdom	The steamship ran aground at Boulogne, Pas-de-Calais, France. She was on a voyage from Grangemouth, Stirlingshire to Saint-Valery-sur-Somme, Somme, France. She was refloated and towed into Saint-Valery-sur-Somme.

== 13 February ==
List of shipwrecks: 13 February 1876
Ship	State	Description
Aspandus	United Kingdom	The schooner ran aground on the Longsand, in the North Sea off the coast of Essex. She was abandoned the next day. Her crew were rescued by the smack Prince of Orange (United Kingdom). Aspandus was on a voyage from Hartlepool, county Durham to Portland, Dorset.
Englishman	United Kingdom	The schooner ran aground on the South Rock, in the Belfast Lough. She floated off and came ashore at Greenisland, County Antrim, where she was wrecked. Her crew were rescued by a lifeboat. She was on a voyage from Ardrossan, Ayrshire to Plymouth, Devon.
Prince of Wales	United Kingdom	The smack ran aground off Tobermory, Isle of Mull.
Queen of the Isles	United Kingdom	The schooner ran aground on the Briggs. She was on a voyage from Caernarfon to Aberdeen. She was refloated.
Trader	United Kingdom	The brigantine was wrecked in Dundrum Bay. Her four crew were rescued by the Newcastle Lifeboat Reigate ( Royal National Lifeboat Institution).

== 14 February ==
List of shipwrecks: 14 February 1876
Ship	State	Description
Caroline	United Kingdom	The brig foundered in the Atlantic Ocean. Her seven crew took to the boats. Four crew in one of the boats were rescued three days later by Caitloch (United Kingdom). Three crew in another boat were rescued by Herpenden (Denmark). Caroline was on a voyage from Sherbro Island, Sierra Leone to Liverpool, Lancashire.
Catherine	United Kingdom	The ship was driven ashore at Clandeboye, County Antrim. She was on a voyage from Annalong, County Down to Greenock, Renfrewshire. She was refloated.
Town of Liverpool	United Kingdom	The ship ran aground on Collier Hope. She was on a voyage from Boulogne, Pas-de-Calais, France to Whitby, Yorkshire.

== 15 February ==
List of shipwrecks: 15 February 1876
Ship	State	Description
Aspendite	United Kingdom	The brigantine was wrecked on the Kentish Knock. Her crew were rescued.
Bothnia	United Kingdom	The steamship was destroyed by fire at sea. Her crew were rescued. She was on a voyage from New Orleans, Louisiana, United States to Liverpool, Lancashire.
Jennie Armstrong	United Kingdom	The ship ran aground near Roche's Point, County Cork. She was on a voyage from Cork to Gloucester. She was refloated with the assistance of a tug but her captain was severely injured in an accident during the refloating.

== 16 February ==
List of shipwrecks: 16 February 1876
Ship	State	Description
Embla	France	The barque ran aground in the South West Pass.
Eugenie	France	The brig collided with the steamship Ann Webster (United Kingdom) and sank in the North Sea 30 nautical miles (56 km) off the mouth of the Humber. Her crew were rescued by the paddle tug William Fenwick (United Kingdom). Eugenie was on a voyage from Sunderland, County Durham, United Kingdom to Nice, Alpes-Maritimes.

== 17 February ==
List of shipwrecks: 17 February 1876
Ship	State	Description
Agioi Demetrius	Greece	The brig ran aground on the Brake Sand. She was on a voyage from London, United Kingdom to Genoa, Italy. She was refloated and taken into The Downs.
Coronella	United Kingdom	The barque departed from Mauritius for Liverpool, Lancashire. No further trace, presumed foundered in a cyclone with the loss of all nine crew.
Dragon	United Kingdom	The steamship collided with the steamship Cambria (United Kingdom) and sank in the Thames Estuary 2.5 nautical miles (4.6 km) off the Nore Lightship ( Trinity House). Dragon was on a voyage from London to Hamburg, Germany. She was refloated on 19 February and taken in tow for London.
Franconia, and Strathclyde	Germany; United Kingdom	The steamship Strathclyde was rammed by the steamship Franconia and sank in the English Channel 3 nautical miles (5.6 km) off Dover, Kent with the loss of 38 of the 56 people on board. Survivors were rescued by Franconia, the barque Queen of the Nation (United Kingdom) and a lugger, and a pilot cutter. Strathclyde was on a voyage from London to Bombay, India. Franconia was severely damaged. She was on a voyage from Antwerp, Belgium to New York. She was towed into The Downs by the tug Victor (United Kingdom). She was subsequently taken into London for repairs. Franconia's captain was subsequently convicted of manslaughter at the Old Bailey.
Halifax	United Kingdom	The passenger-cargo steamship ran ashore at Heligoland. She broke up in a storm on 15 March.
John Pegg	United Kingdom	The schooner was run down and sank in the Thames Estuary off Shoeburyness, Essex with the loss of all five crew by the steamship Finchale (United Kingdom). John Pegg was on a voyage from Port Madoc, Caernarfonshire to London.
Joseph Howe	United Kingdom	The brigantine was driven ashore on Bere Island, County Cork and was wrecked with the loss of two of her six crew. She was on a voyage from Queenstown, County Cork to Falmouth, Cornwall.
Mary Bowen	United Kingdom	The barque was driven ashore in Ballydowen Bay. She was refloated.
Maggie McNeil	United Kingdom	The ship was driven ashore at Rio de Janeiro, Brazil and was wrecked. She was on a voyage from the River Plate to Rio de Janeiro.
Norbiton	United Kingdom	The steamship ran aground in the Elbe. She was on a voyage from London to Cuxhaven, Germany.
Raven	Canada	The schooner was driven ashore 2 nautical miles (3.7 km) east of Dover, Kent, United Kingdom. She was refloated the next day and towed into Dover by the tug Palmerston (United Kingdom).
Royal Diadem	United Kingdom	The barque ran aground on the Brake Sand. She was on a voyage from Hartlepool, County Durham to Cape Town, Cape Colony. She was refloated and taken into The Downs.

== 18 February ==
List of shipwrecks: 18 February 1876
Ship	State	Description
John Ashbury	Royal National Lifeboat Institution	The lifeboat was severely damaged after rescuing crew members of the full-rigged ship Turkestan (United Kingdom). Those rescued were transferred to the tug Wave of Life (United Kingdom).
Rachel	France	The schooner was driven ashore in Largo Bay.
Turkestan	United Kingdom	The full-rigged ship was driven ashore between Harlech and Port Madoc, Caernarfonshire with the loss of a crew member. Thirty of her crew were rescued by the Criccieth Lifeboat John Ashbury ( Royal National Lifeboat Institution), her officers remaining aboard. They were later taken off by a tug. Turkestan was on a voyage from New York, United States to Liverpool, Lancashire.

== 19 February ==
List of shipwrecks: 19 February 1876
Ship	State	Description
Astrid	United Kingdom	The ship foundered in the North Sea off Heligoland.
Augusta	United Kingdom	The ship was driven ashore and wrecked at Fraserburgh, Aberdeenshire. Her five crew were rescued by the Fraserburgh Lifeboat Charlotte ( Royal National Lifeboat Institution). Augusta was on a voyage from Sunderland, County Durham to the Moray Firth.
Avebury	United Kingdom	The ship was driven ashore at Porto, Portugal. She was refloated.
Burriana	Spain	The steamship foundered off Terceira Island, Azores.
City of Mecca	United Kingdom	The steamship ran aground on the Dingypalla Flat, in the Hooghly River. She was on a voyage from Glasgow, Renfrewshire to Calcutta, India. She was refloated.
Etienne et Laurence	France	The barque collided with the barque St. Vincent de Paul (France) in a hurricane at Réunion and foundered with the loss of thirteen of her fifteen crew.
Glenwood	United States	The fishing schooner was sunk in a collision off Highland Lighthouse, Massachusetts. Her crew were rescued.
Java	United Kingdom	The schooner ran aground at Dundrum, County Down. She was refloated the next day.
Sleipner	Sweden	The steamship ran aground off Skagen, Denmark. She was on a voyage from Sunderland, County Durham, United Kingdom to Gothenburg. She was refloated and resumed her voyage.
William Robertson	United States	The brigantine sprang a leak in the Atlantic Ocean and was abandoned by her crew. Of two men in one of the boats, one survived to be rescued a week later by Conold (United Kingdom). William Robertson was on a voyage from Odesa, Russia to Liverpool, Lancashire, United Kingdom.

== 20 February ==
List of shipwrecks: 20 February 1876
Ship	State	Description
Onward	United Kingdom	The brigantine was wrecked at Niarbyl, Isle of Man. She was on a voyage from Dublin to Maryport, Cumberland.
St. Malo	United Kingdom	The ship was driven ashore at Dungeness, Kent. She was on a voyage from London to Calcutta, India.

== 21 February ==
List of shipwrecks: 21 February 1876
Ship	State	Description
Amelie	France	The ship was driven ashore in the River Duddon. She was on a voyage from Nantes, Loire-Inférieure to Rhyl, Denbighshire.
Baltic	United Kingdom	The brigantine was driven ashore and wrecked at King's Cross Point, Isle of Arran. Her crew were rescued.
Cheshire, and Montana	United Kingdom	The Mersey Ferry Cheshire collided with the steamship Montana in the River Mersey. Both vessels were severely damaged.
Coonatto	United Kingdom	The full-rigged ship was driven ashore at the Crowlink Gap, Sussex and was abandoned by her crew. She was on a voyage from Adelaide, South Australia to London. She broke up on 26 February.
Edith Throop	Canada	The ship was driven ashore at Blackwall, Middlesex, United Kingdom. She was refloated.
Eduard	Germany	The ship was driven ashore and wrecked at "Nibben". Her crew were rescued. She was on a voyage from Newcastle upon Tyne, Northumberland, United Kingdom to Memel.
Emil	Norway	The ship ran aground at Liepāja, Russia. Her crew were rescued. She was on a voyage from Messina, Sicily, Italy to Liepāja.
Ferda	Norway	The barque capsized at Philadelphia, Pennsylvania, United States. She was on a voyage from Limerick, United Kingdom to Philadelphia.
Kate Harding	United States	The barque ran aground on the Bulkhead Bar. She was on a voyage from Amsterdam, North Holland, Netherlands to the Hampton Roads, Virginia. She was refloated with the assistance of a tug.
Pride of Scotland	United Kingdom	The tug was destroyed by fire at Peterhead, Aberdeenshire.

== 22 February ==
List of shipwrecks: 22 February 1876
Ship	State	Description
Dante	United Kingdom	The schooner collided with Alberta and sank in the North Sea off the Newarp Lightship ( Trinity House) with the loss of a crew member. Survivors were rescued by Alberta.
Duna	Russia	The steamship was sunk by ice at Bolderāja.
Hero	United Kingdom	The brigantine collided with the steamship Switzerland (Netherlands) and sank in the English Channel off Folkestone, Kent with the loss of four of her six crew. Survivors were rescued by Switzerland.

== 23 February ==
List of shipwrecks: 23 February 1876
Ship	State	Description
Lammermuir	United Kingdom	The East Indiaman was sighted whilst on a voyage from Calcutta, India to Demerara, British Guiana. No further trace, presumed foundered with the loss of 230 lives.
Norina	Trieste	The barque ran aground at Ipswich, Suffolk, United Kingdom. She was on a voyage from Baltimore, Maryland, United States to Ipswich. She was refloated.
Reine Hortense	France	The ship was wrecked in a hurricane at New Caledonia.
Shark	United Kingdom	The schooner was driven ashore and wrecked on Langeoog, Germany. She was on a voyage from Brake, Germany to Newcastle upon Tyne, Northumberland.

== 24 February ==
List of shipwrecks: 24 February 1876
Ship	State	Description
Edith Owen	United Kingdom	The steamship ran aground at Horseshoe Point, in the River Avon. She was on a voyage from Liverpool, Lancashire to Bristol, Gloucestershire.
Jura	United Kingdom	The ship ran aground and was damaged at Dundrum, County Down. She was on a voyage from Dublin to Dundrum.
William Caroline	United Kingdom	The smack put into Bangor, County Down in a sinking condition. She was on a voyage from Dublin to Dumfries.
Winsome	United Kingdom	The ship was driven ashore and wrecked at Las Palmas, Gran Canaria, Canary Islands. Her five crew were rescued. She was on a voyage from London to Las Palmas.

== 25 February ==
List of shipwrecks: 25 February 1876
Ship	State	Description
E. Waters	United Kingdom	The ship was driven ashore and wrecked in Mossel Bay.
Jane	United Kingdom	The schooner was driven ashore at Portpatrick, Wigtownshire. She was on a voyage from Bowling, Dunbartonshire to Caernarfon. She was refloated and placed under repair.
Rosa	Italy	The steamship was wrecked on Île Amsterdam with the loss of a crew member. She was on a voyage from Cardiff, Glamorgan, United Kingdom to Singapore, Straits Settlements. Survivors were rescued by a fishing vessel on 27 March.
Unnamed	Flag unknown	The schooner was driven ashore on the Isle of Arran, United Kingdom.

== 26 February ==
List of shipwrecks: 26 February 1876
Ship	State	Description
Arklow	United Kingdom	The steamship was holed when her propeller shaft broke and was beached on the Leodes Bank, in the Irish Sea off the coast of County Waterford. She was on a voyage from Waterford to Glasgow, Renfrewshire.
Emilia and Jane	(United Kingdom of Great Britain and Ireland) Jersey	The schooner ran aground at New Ross, County Wexford. She was on a voyage from New Ross to Dublin. She was refloated on 28 February and resumed her voyage the next day.
Mendota	United States	The barque was driven ashore at Barber's Point, in the Dardanelles. She was on a voyage from Newhaven, Connecticut, to Constantinople, Ottoman Empire. She was refloated with the assistance of a tug and resumed her voyage.

== 27 February ==
List of shipwrecks: 27 February 1876
Ship	State	Description
Addie M. Evans	United States	The barque collided with the barque Maddie Chadman (Flag unknown) and ran aground on the Kalootbank, off the coast of Zeeland, Netherlands.
Harlingen	United Kingdom	The steamship struck the wreck of Strathclyde (United Kingdom and sank off Dover, Kent. Her eleven crew survived. She was on a voyage from London to Rouen, Seine-Inférieure, France.
Linthorpe	United Kingdom	The steamship foundered off Corrubedo, Spain with the loss of five of her crew. She was on a voyage from Huelva, Spainh to London.
Reverie	(United Kingdom of Great Britain and Ireland) Guernsey	The smack was driven ashore and wrecked on the Linch Sands, Pembrokeshire with the loss of all hands. She was on a voyage from Cardiff, Glamorgan to a French port.
Jessie McLeod	Canada	Canadian cargo ship, transporting oats from Nova Scotia Canada to Southwark, England, capsized 2 miles off the coast of Kerry Head in County Kerry, Ireland.
Trafalgar	United Kingdom	The barque was driven ashore on the Isle of Arran. She was refloated on 1 March and towed back to Greenock, Renfrewshire.

== 28 February ==
List of shipwrecks: 28 February 1876
Ship	State	Description
Anna Botilda	Sweden	The ship collided with Hekla (Sweden and sank. Anna Botilda was on a voyage from Copenhagen, Denmark to Gothenburg. She was refloated and taken into Helsingør, Denmark.
Caprice	United States	The pilot boat was run down and sunk off Bay Ridge, New York, by the steamship New Orleans (United States). Her crew were rescued by New Orleans. Caprice was later raised, repaired and returned to service.
Edie Waters	United Kingdom	The ship was driven ashore and wrecked on Madeira.
Mary Belle	United States	The steamboat was destroyed by fire at Vicksburg, Mississippi. All on board, more than 250 people, survived.
Nettle	United States	The pilot boat was reported lying one mile (1.6 km) from the outer bar buoy in 4 1/2 fathoms (27 ft; 8.2 m) of water, with her bowsprit underwater in Pensacola Bay.
Pennsylvania	United States	The steamship was driven ashore in the Bight of Newcastle 30 nautical miles (56 km) south of Philadelphia, Pennsylvania. She was on a voyage from Philadelphia to Liverpool, Lancashire, United Kingdom.
Reverie	United Kingdom	The smack capsized in the Bristol Channel with the loss of all hands.
Trafalgar	United Kingdom	The barque was driven ashore on the Isle of Arran. She was refloated on 2 March and towed back to Glasgow, Renfrewshire.

== 29 February ==
List of shipwrecks: 29 February 1876
Ship	State	Description
Ann Catherine	United Kingdom	The ship was driven ashore and wrecked near Aberffraw, Anglesey. She was on a voyage from Brazil to Liverpool, Lancashire.
Aria and Betsy	Netherlands	The ship was wrecked off "Poely", Menjangan Island, Netherlands East Indies. Her crew were rescued. She was on a voyage from Java, Netherlands East Indies to Amsterdam, North Holland.

== Unknown date ==
List of shipwrecks: Unknown date in February 1876
Ship	State	Description
Albert	Flag unknown	The ship was driven ashore and wrecked at East London, Cape Colony. All on board were rescued.
Agate	United States	The whaler a barque, was wrecked on an island in the Dampier Strait. All 17 people on board survived. They were rescued from the island on 2 March by the barque Panic (United States). Agate was on a voyage from "Kodish,". Department of Alaska to San Francisco, California.
Atlantic	United Kingdom	The ship was driven ashore and wrecked on Lobos Island.
Battle Axe	United States	The barque was damaged in a hurricane at San Francisco, California, before 17 February.
Cairo	United Kingdom	The ship was wrecked on Grand Bahama, Bahamas before 23 February. She was on a voyage from New Orleans, Louisiana, United States to Queenstown, County Cork.
Frithiof	Norway	The brig was abandoned in the Atlantic Ocean before 5 February with the loss of her captain. Nine survivors were rescued by Euclid (United Kingdom). Frithiof was on a voyage from Baltimore, Maryland, United States to Dundalk, County Louth, United Kingdom.
George	United Kingdom	The Thames barge collided with the steamship Estella (Flag unknown) and sank in the River Thames. She was refloated on 1 March and beached at East Greenwich.
Hannah and Mary	United Kingdom	The ship was driven ashore at Winterton-on-Sea, Norfolk. She was on a voyage from Sunderland, County Durham to Singapore, Straits Settlements. She was refloated and put back to Sunderland in a leaky condition.
Heiterdalen	Norway	The schooner was abandoned in the Atlantic Ocean before 20 February.
Herder	United Kingdom	The steamship was damaged by fire at New York, United States. She was on a voyage from New York to Hamburg, Germany.
Historian	United Kingdom	The steamship was driven ashore at "Ushuff". She was refloated and taken into Suez, Egypt, where she arrived on 25 February.
Ilaska	United Kingdom	The full-rigged ship was damaged in a hurricane at San Francisco sometime before 17 February.
James Wall	United States	The schooner was abandoned in the Atlantic Ocean before 26 February.
Jessie	United Kingdom	The schooner ran aground at Vlissingen, Zeeland, Netherlands. She was on a voyage from Antwerp, Belgium to Gloucester. She was refloated and taken into Vlissingen in a leaky condition.
Johan	Germany	The brigantine foundered at sea with the loss of her captain. Five survivors were rescued by the barque Gethsemane (Russia). Johan was on a voyage from South Shields, County Durham, United Kingdom to Málaga, Spain.
Juhl	Flag unknown	The ship was driven ashore and wrecked at East London. Her crew were rescued.
Lady McDonald	United Kingdom	The ship was wrecked in Algoa Bay.
La Victorine	France	The ship foundered. Her crew were rescued by Blair Drummond (United Kingdom).
Le Baron	France	The ship was destroyed by fire off Cape Horn, Chile. Her crew were rescued. She was on a voyage from Hull, Yorkshire to Valparaíso, Chile.
Martinus en Henriette	Netherlands	The steamship ran aground on the Banjaard Sand, in the North Sea. She was refloated on 11 February and taken into Dortrecht, South Holland.
Medina	United Kingdom	The ship ran aground at Port Royal, Jamaica. She was refloated.
Memento	United Kingdom	The ship was driven ashore and wrecked at East London. All on board were rescued.
Memphis	United Kingdom	The steamship was driven ashore on the American coast. She was refloated.
Naponset	United States	The ship was abandoned in the Atlantic Ocean. Her crew were rescued by the steamship Aurora (United Kingdom). Naponset was on a voyage from Glasgow, Renfrewshire, United Kingdom to Demerara, British Guiana.
Nervion	Spain	The steamship ran aground at Bayonne, Basses-Pyrénées. She was on a voyage from Bilbao to Bayonne. She was refloated and temporary repairs were made with the intentio of returning to Bilbao for permanent repairs.
Niagara	United States	The full-rigged ship was damaged in a hurricane at San Francisco before 17 February.
Patmos	United Kingdom	The ship was destroyed by fire at sea before 19 February. Her crew survived. She was on a voyage from Hull to Valparaíso.
Precursor	United Kingdom	The schooner was abandoned in the Atlantic Ocean before 18 February.
Presto	United Kingdom	The ship was driven ashore on the North Breakers before 17 February. She was on a voyage from Doboy, Georgia, to a British port.
Progress	United Kingdom	The ship was abandoned in the Atlantic Ocean. Her crew were rescued. She was on a voyage from Galveston, Texas, to Liverpool, Lancashire.
Rosamond	United Kingdom	The ship was driven ashore and wrecked on Barbados. Her crew survived.
Seaham	United Kingdom	The ship was driven ashore at Dunkirk, Nord. She was later refloated.
Stebonheath	United Kingdom	The ship was wrecked on Grand Cayman, Cayman Islands before 17 February. She was on a voyage from Cartagena, Spain to Pensacola, Florida, United States.
Susanna	Netherlands	The koff was driven ashore on Texel, North Holland. She was on a voyage from Newcastle upon Tyne, Northumberland, United Kingdom to Harlingen, Friesland.
Two Brothers	United Kingdom	The fishing smack was run down by a Norwegian barque and sank in the North Sea off Flamborough Head, Yorkshire. Her crew were rescued by the smack Blue Jacket (United Kingdom).
Undaunted	United Kingdom	The fishing smack was wrecked on the Stoney Binks, in the North Sea off the mouth of the Humber. Her four crew were rescued by the Spurn Point Lifeboat.
Vernon	United States	The barque was damaged in a hurricane at San Francisco before 17 February.
W. R. Grace	United States	The ship was driven ashore at Egremont, Lancashire. She was on a voyage from San Francisco, California, to Liverpool.
