= HMS Talisman =

HMS Talisman has been the name of more than one ship of the British Royal Navy, and may refer to:

- HMS Louis (1913), a destroyer originally named HMS Talisman but renamed Louis while under construction
- HMS Talisman (1915), one of four Talisman-class destroyers, taken over by the Royal Navy during the First World War
- HMS Talisman (N78), a submarine commissioned in 1940 and sunk in 1942
