= HMS Turbulent (1916) =

Destroyer of the Royal Navy

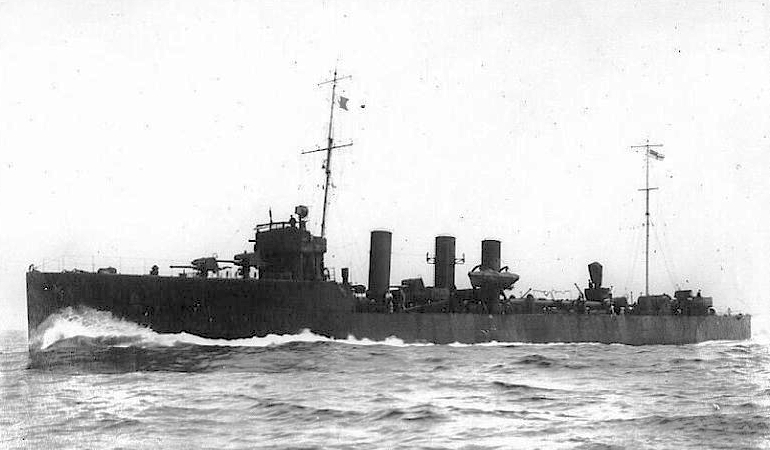

History

United Kingdom
- Name: HMS Turbulent
- Builder: Hawthorn Leslie and Company, Newcastle upon Tyne
- Laid down: 1915
- Launched: 5 January 1916
- Completed: 1 May 1916
- Renamed: Built as Ogre; Renamed on 15 February 1915
- Fate: Sunk during the Battle of Jutland, 1 June 1916

General characteristics
- Class & type: Talisman-class destroyer
- Displacement: 1,098 long tons (1,116 t)
- Length: 309 ft (94 m) o/a
- Beam: 28 ft 7 in (8.71 m)
- Draught: 9 ft 6 in (2.90 m)
- Installed power: 25,000 shp (19,000 kW); 3 × Yarrow boilers
- Propulsion: 3 Shafts; 3 steam turbines
- Speed: 32 knots (59 km/h; 37 mph)
- Complement: 102
- Armament: 5 × QF 4-inch (102 mm) Mark IV guns; 2 × twin 21-inch (533 mm) torpedo tubes

HMS Turbulent was one of four Talisman-class destroyers ordered for the Ottoman Navy and taken over by the Royal Navy during the First World War.

== Description ==
The Talismans were designed by Armstrong Whitworth for the Ottoman Navy, but were sub-contracted to Hawthorn Leslie and Company for building. They displaced 1,098 long tons (1,116 t). The ships had an overall length of 309 feet (94.2 m), a beam of 28 feet 7 inches (8.7 m) and a draught of 9 feet 6 inches (2.9 m). They were powered by three Parsons direct-drive steam turbines, each driving one propeller shaft, using steam provided by three Yarrow boilers. The turbines developed a total of 25,000 shaft horsepower (19,000 kW) and gave a maximum speed of 32 knots (59 km/h; 37 mph). The ships carried a maximum of 237 long tons (241 t) of fuel oil. The ships' complement was 102 officers and ratings.

The Talisman-class ships were heavily armed for their time, shipping five single QF 4-inch (102 mm) Mark IV guns. Two of the guns were side-by-side on the forecastle. The other guns were carried on the centreline; one between the first and second funnels, one after the searchlight platform and one on a bandstand on the quarterdeck. All the guns had half-shields. The ships were designed to accommodate three above water twin mounts for 21-inch (533 mm) torpedoes, but only two mounts were fitted in British service.

== Construction and career ==
The vessel was originally to have been named Ogre, but was renamed whilst under construction, on 15 February 1915. She was launched on 5 January 1916 and completed in May 1916.

She served with the 10th Destroyer Flotilla of the Grand Fleet from her completion. She was sunk on 1 June 1916 at the Battle of Jutland by the German cruiser Regensburg and the destroyers V71 and V73. with the deaths of 90 crew members, and the surviving 13 became prisoners of war. The wrecksite is designated as a protected place under the Protection of Military Remains Act 1986.

== Bibliography ==
- Colledge, J. J.; Warlow, Ben (2006) [1969]. Ships of the Royal Navy: The Complete Record of All Fighting Ships of the Royal Navy from the 15th Century to the Present (3rd Rev ed.). London: Chatham Publishing. ISBN 978-1-86176-281-8. OCLC 67375475.
- Campbell, John (1998). Jutland: An Analysis of the Fighting. New York: Lyons Press. ISBN 1-55821-759-2.
- Dittmar, F.J. & Colledge, J.J. (1972). British Warships 1914–1919. Shepperton, UK: Ian Allan. ISBN 0-7110-0380-7.
- Friedman, Norman (2009). British Destroyers: From Earliest Days to the Second World War. Barnsley, UK: Seaforth Publishing. ISBN 978-1-84832-049-9.
- Gardiner, Robert & Gray, Randal, eds. (1985). Conway's All The World's Fighting Ships 1906–1921. London: Conway Maritime Press. ISBN 0-85177-245-5.
- March, Edgar J. (1966). British Destroyers: A History of Development, 1892–1953; Drawn by Admiralty Permission From Official Records & Returns, Ships' Covers & Building Plans. London: Seeley Service. OCLC 164893555.
