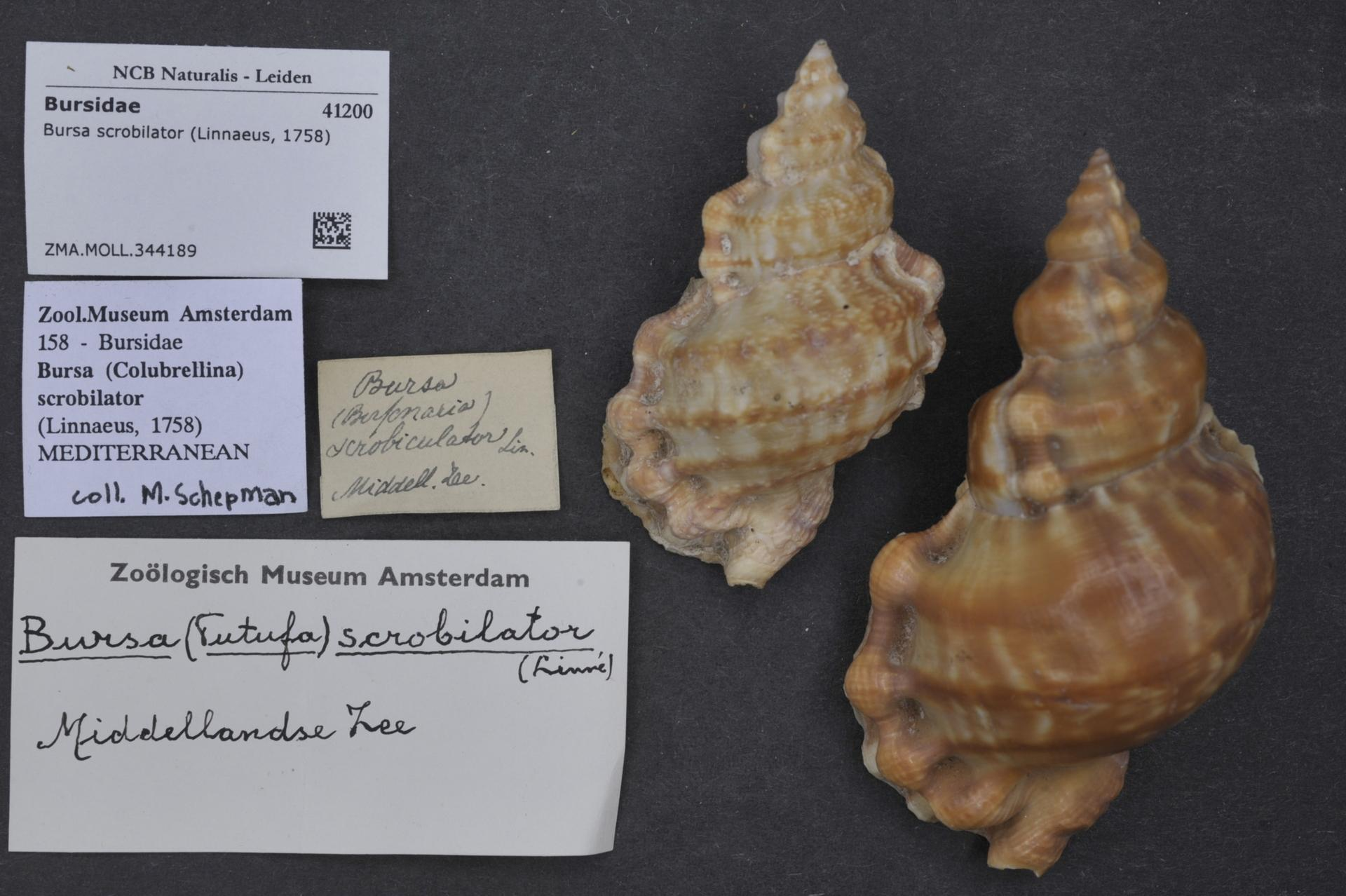

Scientific classification
- Kingdom: Animalia
- Phylum: Mollusca
- Class: Gastropoda
- Subclass: Caenogastropoda
- Order: Littorinimorpha
- Family: Bursidae
- Genus: Talisman
- Species: T. scrobilator

Binomial name
- Talisman scrobilator (Linnaeus, 1758)

Synonyms
- Apollon quercina Mörch, 1853; Bufonaria pesleonis Schumacher, 1817; Bufonaria scrobiculator [sic] (misspelling ); Bufonaria scrobiculator var. minor Pallary, 1900; Bufonaria scrobiculatoria Locard, 1886; Bursa scrobiculator (Linnaeus, 1758); Murex scrobilator Linnaeus, 1758; Ranella coriacea Reeve, 1844; Talisman parfaiti de Folin, 1887 ·

= Talisman scrobilator =

Species of gastropod

Talisman scrobilator is a species of sea snail, a marine gastropod mollusk in the family Bursidae, the frog shells.

A study, published in 2019, has shown that the Atlantic-Mediterranean Talisman scrobilator forms a species complex with two extant forms, proposed as subspecies, and one fossil form:

- Talisman scrobilator scrobilator (Linnaeus, 1758) (synonym: Murex scrobilator Linnaeus, 1758) (distribution in the Atlantic Ocean and the Mediterranean Sea)
- Talisman scrobilator coriaceum (Reeve, 1844) (synonym: Ranella coriacea Reeve, 1844) (distribution off West Africa)
- Talisman nodosa (fossil from Miocene strata in the Mediterranean Sea).
