= Talisman (gastropod) =

Scientific classification
- Kingdom: Animalia
- Phylum: Mollusca
- Class: Gastropoda
- Subclass: Caenogastropoda
- Order: Littorinimorpha
- Superfamily: Tonnoidea
- Family: Bursidae
- Genus: Talisman de Folin, 1887

Type species
- Talisman parfaiti de Folin, 1887

Synonyms
- Bufonariella Thiele, 1929; Bursa (Bufonariella) Thiele, 1929 ·

Genus of gastropods

Talisman is a genus of sea snails, marine gastropod mollusks in the family Bursidae, the frog shells.

== Species ==
- Talisman scrobilator (Linnaeus, 1758)

Synonym

- Talisman parfaiti de Folin, 1887: synonym of Talisman scrobilator (Linnaeus, 1758)
