= Malpas Belle =

19th-century boat

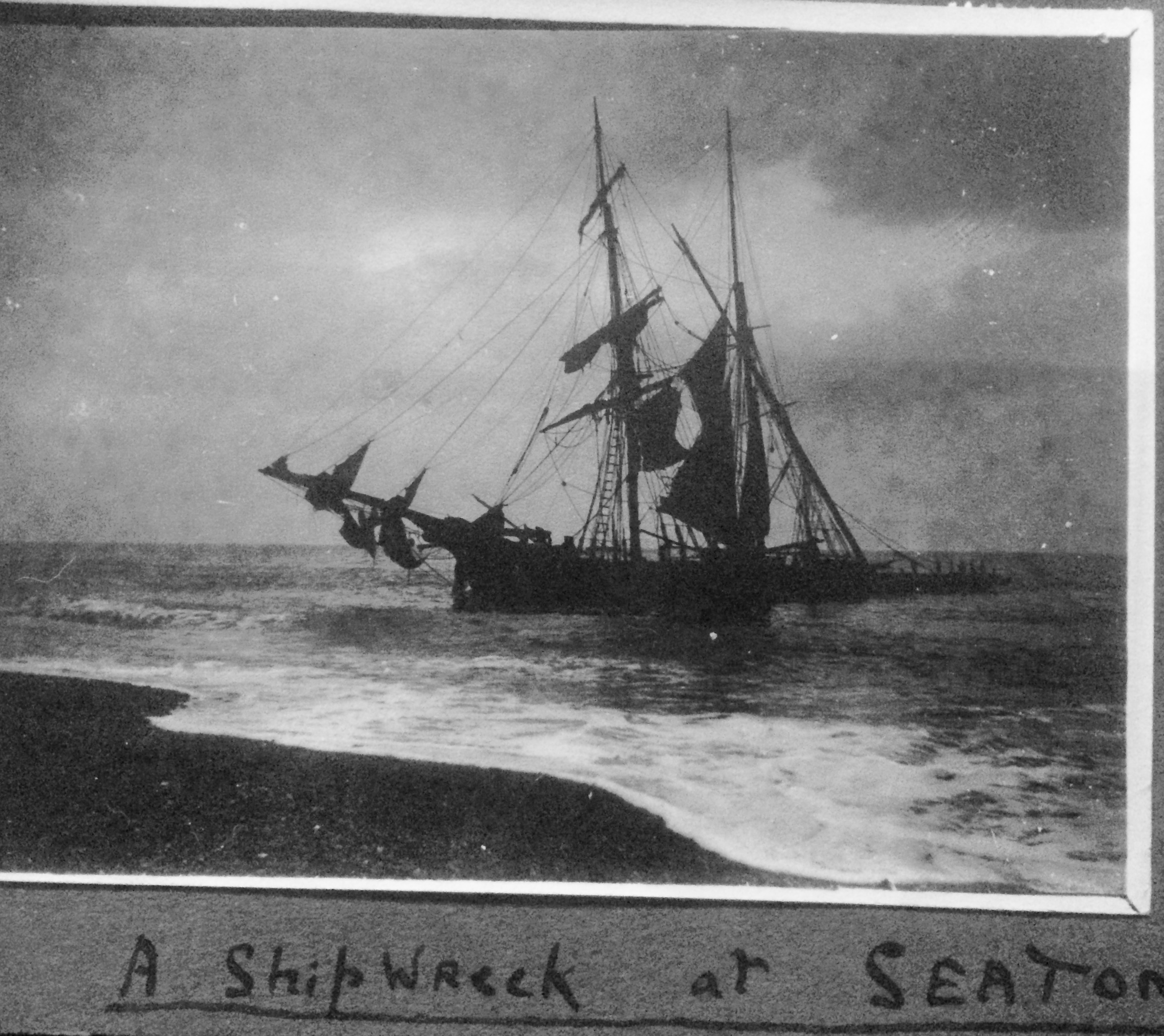
Malpas Belle on Seaton beach, 3 February 1922

Malpas Belle was a wooden schooner, a brigantine (179 tons) built in 1872 by Nicholas Scoble Truro. The boat became stranded on Seaton beach on 3 February 1922 during a voyage from Antwerp to Penarth with a cargo of bog ore on board.

On 28 October 1908, a 321 GRT steamer on a passage from Cherbourg for Poole with a cargo of stone ran into heavy seas mid-English Channel which shifted her cargo. The vessel had to be abandoned and she foundered around 04:30. The crew was saved by the schooner Malpas Belle and landed in Falmouth.

On 25 April 1916 she was rescued by the Ramsey Life-boat.
