= Frolic-class gunvessel =

Class overview
- Name: Frolic class
- Operators: Royal Navy
- Preceded by: Beacon class
- Succeeded by: Arab class
- Built: 1871–1873
- Completed: 4
- Scrapped: 3

General characteristics (as built)
- Type: Composite screw gunvessel
- Displacement: 610 long tons (620 t)
- Tons burthen: 462 bm
- Length: 155 ft (47.2 m) (p/p)
- Beam: 25 ft (7.6 m)
- Draught: 9 ft 6 in (2.9 m)
- Depth: 11 ft (3.4 m)
- Installed power: 715–896 ihp (533–668 kW)
- Propulsion: 2 shafts; 2 × 2-cylinder horizontal compound-expansion trunk steam engines; 3 × cylindrical boilers
- Sail plan: Barque rig
- Speed: 10–11 knots (19–20 km/h; 12–13 mph)
- Range: 880 nmi (1,630 km; 1,010 mi) at 10 knots (19 km/h; 12 mph)
- Complement: 80
- Armament: 1 × 7-inch rifled muzzle-loading gun; 1 × 6.3-inch 64-pounder rifled muzzle-loading gun; 2 × 20-pounder rifled beechloading guns

The Frolic-class gunvessels were a class of composite gunboats built for the Royal Navy in the early 1870s. They were generally deployed overseas to the East Indies, West Africa, and China Stations. In addition to showing the flag, the ships fought pirates and suppressed the slave trade in East Africa. They were placed in reserve in the mid-1880s, and two of them were sold for scrap by the end of the decade. The other pair survived for longer as they were either modified for harbour service or became a training ship before being sold or scrapped. The last survivor, Ready, was used in support of William Beebe's expedition in his bathysphere in 1930 off Bermuda.

== Design and description ==
The four ships of the Frolic class were repeats of the preceding Beacon class despite being begun four years later. The ships were 155 feet (47.2 m) long between perpendiculars and had a beam of 25 feet (7.6 m). Forward, the ships had a draught of 7 feet 9 inches (2.4 m), but aft they drew 9 ft 6 in (2.9 m). They displaced 610 long tons (620 t) as built and had a burthen of 462 tons. The depth of hold was 11 feet (3.4 m) and the hull was subdivided by watertight bulkheads. Their crew consisted of 80 officers and enlisted men.

The supply of engines from the old Crimean War gunboats had been exhausted by that time and they were given brand-new engines. Unlike their half sisters, these ships received new compound-expansion trunk steam engines from John Penn and Sons. Each engine powered a single 6-foot (1.8 m) propeller. The engines produced between 715 and 896 indicated horsepower (533 and 668 kW) which gave the ships a maximum speed between 10 and 11 knots (19 and 20 km/h; 12 and 13 mph). The new engines proved to be more powerful than those used in the Beacons, but they were as uneconomical as the simple steam engines used in the older ships and fell from favour as a result. Three cylindrical boilers provided steam to the engines at a working pressure of 80 psi (552 kPa; 6 kgf/cm^{2}). The ships carried 80 long tons (81 t) of coal which gave them a range of 880 nmi (1,630 km; 1,010 mi) at 10 knots.

The hull shape of the Frolics was identical to that of their predecessors and they had a very full hull shape with squared-off bilges and a flat bottom. Admiral G. A. Ballard commented that they were built "along the lines of an extremely elongated packing crate." This made them steady gun platforms and gave them quite a bit of buoyancy. If they ran aground, this shape allowed them to be pulled off easily and they remained upright if stranded by a receding tide. However, this hull shape made their steering erratic at low speeds or in a following sea and they made a large amount of leeway in a strong side breeze.

The class was barque rigged and their best speed under sail alone was over 12 knots (22 km/h; 14 mph) if running before the wind, despite the drag of the propellers, which could neither be hoisted out of the water, nor feathered. In a headwind, Ballard described them as "quite unmanageable under sail alone" because of their shallow draft and flat bottom. Their funnels were hinged to lower horizontally to reduce wind resistance while under sail. A poop deck was added in between commissions, but this was the only major structural change made during their careers.

The ships were initially armed with a mix of 7-inch and 64-pounder 56 cwt (Note: "cwt" is the abbreviation for hundredweight, 56 cwt referring to the weight of the gun.) rifled muzzle-loading guns and a pair of 20-pounder rifled breechloading guns. The 7-inch (178 mm) and 64-pounder guns were mounted on the centreline as pivot guns while the two 20-pounder guns were mounted at the bow and stern as chase guns. The 16-calibre 7-inch gun weighed 6.5 long tons (6.6 t) and fired a 112-pound (50.8 kg) shell. It was credited with the nominal ability to penetrate 7.7-inch (196 mm) armour. A lighter, 4.5-long-ton (4.6 t), 7-inch gun developed in the 1870s replaced the heavier gun in Frolic and it replaced both heavy guns in Rifleman.

== Ships ==
| Name | Ship Builder | Launched | Fate |
|---|---|---|---|
| HMS Frolic | Chatham Dockyard | 29 February 1872 | Drill ship in 1888. Coastguard Watch Vessel W.V.30, 1893, renamed W.V.41, 1897 and sold, 7 April 1908 |
| HMS Kestrel | Chatham Dockyard | 29 February 1872 | Sold, November 1888 |
| HMS Ready | Chatham Dockyard | 24 September 1872 | Became tank vessel in 1894, renamed Drudge in October 1916. Sold, 25 February 1920 and later converted into a lighter |
| HMS Rifleman | Chatham Dockyard | 20 November 1872 | Sold, 26 April 1890 |

== Service ==
These ships were primarily designed for service in Southeast Asian waters, including the rivers, and Frolic and Kestrel spent at least one commission there. Their duties included protecting British lives and property and fighting pirates. Another major deployment area was the Gulf of Guinea in West Africa where Frolic and Rifleman served part of one or more commissions. Frolic, Ready, and Rifleman served at least one commission off the south-east coast of South America. Kestrel, Ready, and Rifleman each made one or more deployment to the East Indies Station where they helped to suppress the slave trade between East Africa and the Persian Gulf. At the beginning of the Anglo-Egyptian War of 1882, Ready seized the assets of the Suez Canal Company, including its dredgers. At the end of 1873, Kestrel was on the China Station, Ready off South America, and Rifleman in the East Indies. A few months later, Frolic was one of the ships that blockaded the mouth of the Klang River in Malaysia in an attempt to suppress piracy supported by the local sultan. Together with the survey ship Nassau, Rifleman helped to suppress a rebellion in Mombasa against the British-supported Sultan of Zanzibar in 1875.

All four ships were placed in reserve in the mid-1880s and Kestrel and Rifleman were sold in 1888 and 1890 respectively. Frolic became a training ship for the Royal Navy Volunteer Reserve in 1888 before being assigned to the Coastguard in 1893 as Watch Vessel W.V.30 and later W.V.41. She was sold for scrap on 7 April 1908. Ready was converted into a tank vessel in 1894, renamed Drudge in October 1916 and sold in Bermuda on 25 February 1920. Her new owners converted her to a lighter and she carried the winch that hoisted William Beebe's bathysphere up and down in 1930. Her remains, positively identified by J. M. Greeley during an underwater archaeology field school held by East Carolina University in 1998, lie on the north side of St. George's Harbor Bermuda beside a former coaling wharf at Latitude 32°22'50.23"N and Longitude 64°40'14.68"W. The hull can be seen on Google Earth just below the water's surface on a north-south orientation with the bow towards the shoreline and the stern in deeper water. In 1998 the semicircular tracks for the gun mounts were still visible in what remained of the deck. The mounts for the boilers remained in the midsection and the outline of the boilers and funnel shaft were clearly visible on the aft side of the forward bulkhead.

== Bibliography ==
- Ballard, G. A. (1941). "British Gunvessels of 1875: The Smaller Twin-Screw Type". Mariner's Mirror. 27 (April): 132–146. doi:10.1080/00253359.1941.10658756.
- Lyon, David & Winfield, Rif (2004). The Sail and Steam Navy List: All the Ships of the Royal Navy 1815–1889. Chatham Publishing. ISBN 978-1-86176-032-6. OCLC 52620555.
- Preston, Antony; Major, John (2007). Send a Gunboat: The Victorian Navy and Supremacy at Sea, 1854–1904 (2nd ed.). London: Conway. ISBN 978-0-85177-923-2.
- Roberts, John (1979). "Great Britain (including Empire Forces)". In Chesneau, Roger & Kolesnik, Eugene M. (eds.). Conway's All the World's Fighting Ships 1860–1905. Mayflower Books. pp. 1–113. ISBN 0-8317-0302-4.
