= SS Halifax =

Commercial ship

History
- Name: SS Halifax
- Operator: Manchester, Sheffield and Lincolnshire Railway
- Port of registry: (United Kingdom)
- Builder: John Elder and Company, Govan
- Yard number: 149
- Launched: 17 December 1872
- Out of service: 18 February 1876
- Fate: Sunk

General characteristics
- Tonnage: 1,079 gross register tons (GRT)
- Length: 231 feet (70 m)
- Beam: 30.2 feet (9.2 m)

SS Halifax was a passenger and cargo vessel built for the Manchester, Sheffield and Lincolnshire Railway in 1872.

== History ==
The ship was built by John Elder and Company of Govan and launched on 17 December 1872. She was the second in an order for two ships from the same shipyard, the other being Huddersfield.

On 16 February 1876 she left Grimsby for Hamburg, and on 17 February ran ashore at Heligoland. She broke up in a storm on 15 March 1876 and was a total loss. Unfortunately for the railway company had not insured her and this added to the losses reported by the company later that year.
