= Talisman-class destroyer =

1916 class of British destroyers

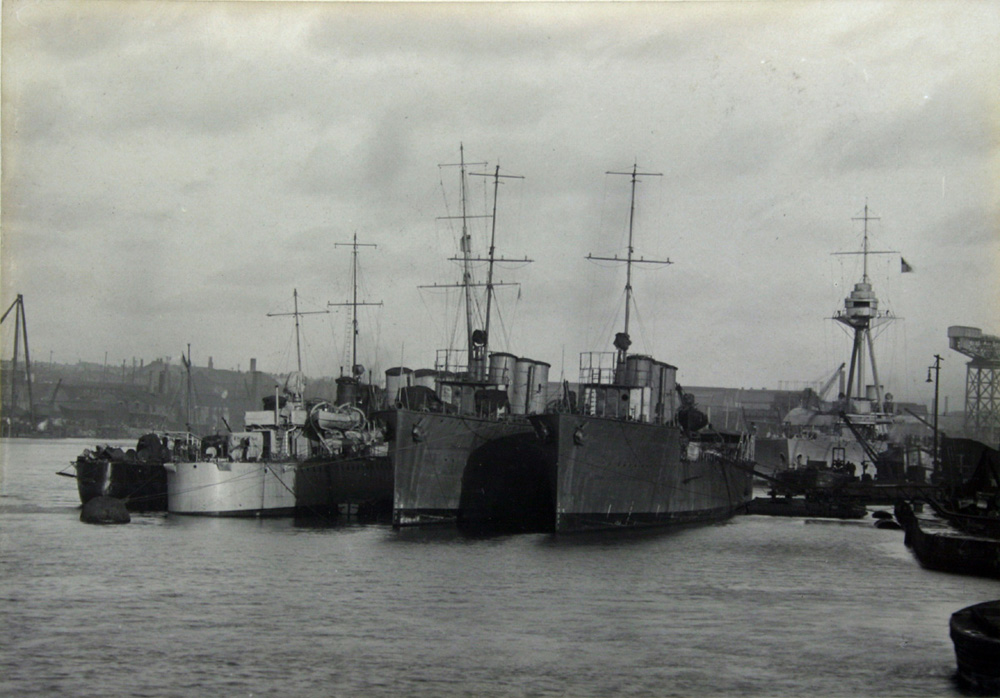
- HMS Marksman, HMS Talisman and HMS Termagant moored at the Hawthorn Leslie shipyard, Hebburn, 5 November 1915.

Class overview
- Name: Talisman class
- Builders: Hawthorn Leslie and Company
- Operators: Royal Navy
- Preceded by: Thornycroft M class
- Succeeded by: Medea class
- In service: 1916–1921
- Completed: 4
- Lost: 1
- Retired: 3

General characteristics
- Type: Destroyer
- Displacement: 1,098 long tons (1,116 t)
- Length: 309 ft (94 m) o/a
- Beam: 28 ft 7 in (8.71 m)
- Draught: 9 ft 6 in (2.90 m)
- Installed power: 25,000 shp (19,000 kW); 3 × Yarrow boilers
- Propulsion: 3 shafts; 3 steam turbines
- Speed: 32 knots (59 km/h; 37 mph)
- Complement: 102
- Armament: 5 × QF 4-inch (102 mm) Mark IV guns; 2 × twin 21-inch (533 mm) torpedo tubes

The Talisman class were a quartet of destroyers ordered for the Ottoman Navy before the First World War, but were taken over in November 1914 and completed for the Royal Navy.

== Description ==
The Talismans were designed by Armstrong Whitworth for the Ottoman Navy, but were sub-contracted to Hawthorn Leslie and Company for building. They displaced 1,098 long tons (1,116 t). The ships had an overall length of 309 feet (94.2 m), a beam of 28 feet 7 inches (8.7 m) and a draught of 9 feet 6 inches (2.9 m). They were powered by three Parsons direct-drive steam turbines, each driving one propeller shaft, using steam provided by three Yarrow boilers. The turbines developed a total of 25,000 shaft horsepower (19,000 kW) and gave a maximum speed of 32 knots (59 km/h; 37 mph). The ships carried a maximum of 237 long tons (241 t) of fuel oil. The ships' complement was 102 officers and ratings. The hull form was considered particularly successful and was adopted for the V and W class of 1917, arguably the peak of destroyer development at the time.

The Talisman-class ships were heavily armed for their time, shipping five single QF 4-inch (102 mm) Mark IV guns. Two of the guns were side by side on the forecastle. The other guns were carried on the centreline; one between the first and second funnels, one after the searchlight platform and one on a bandstand on the quarterdeck. All the guns had half-shields. The ships were designed to accommodate three above water twin mounts for 21-inch (533 mm) torpedoes, but only two mounts were fitted in British service.

== Ships ==
Originally to have been renamed Napier, Narborough, Offa and Ogre respectively, they were re-allocated "T" names in February 1915.

Name	Ship builder	Laid down	Launched	Completed	Fate
Talisman	Hawthorn Leslie and Company, Newcastle upon Tyne	7 December 1914	15 July 1915	1 January 1916	Sold for breaking up 9 May 1921.
Termagant	Hawthorn Leslie and Company, Newcastle upon Tyne	17 December 1914	26 August 1915	18 March 1916	Sold for breaking up 9 May 1921.
Trident	Hawthorn Leslie and Company, Newcastle upon Tyne	1 July 1915	20 November 1915	24 March 1916	Sold for breaking up 9 May 1921.
Turbulent	Hawthorn Leslie and Company, Newcastle upon Tyne	1915	5 January 1916	May 1916	Sunk by the German battleship Westfalen during Battle of Jutland, 31 May 1916.

== Bibliography ==
- Colledge, J. J.; Warlow, Ben (2006) [1969]. Ships of the Royal Navy: The Complete Record of All Fighting Ships of the Royal Navy from the 15th Century to the Present (3rd Rev ed.). London: Chatham Publishing. ISBN 978-1-86176-281-8. OCLC 67375475.
- Dittmar, F.J. & Colledge, J.J. (1972). British Warships 1914–1919. Shepperton, UK: Ian Allan. ISBN 0-7110-0380-7.
- Friedman, Norman (2009). British Destroyers: From Earliest Days to the Second World War. Barnsley, UK: Seaforth Publishing. ISBN 978-1-84832-049-9.
- Gardiner, Robert & Gray, Randal, eds. (1985). Conway's All The World's Fighting Ships 1906–1921. London: Conway Maritime Press. ISBN 0-85177-245-5.
- March, Edgar J. (1966). British Destroyers: A History of Development, 1892–1953; Drawn by Admiralty Permission From Official Records & Returns, Ships' Covers & Building Plans. London: Seeley Service. OCLC 164893555.
