= HMS Louis (1913) =

Destroyer of the Royal Navy

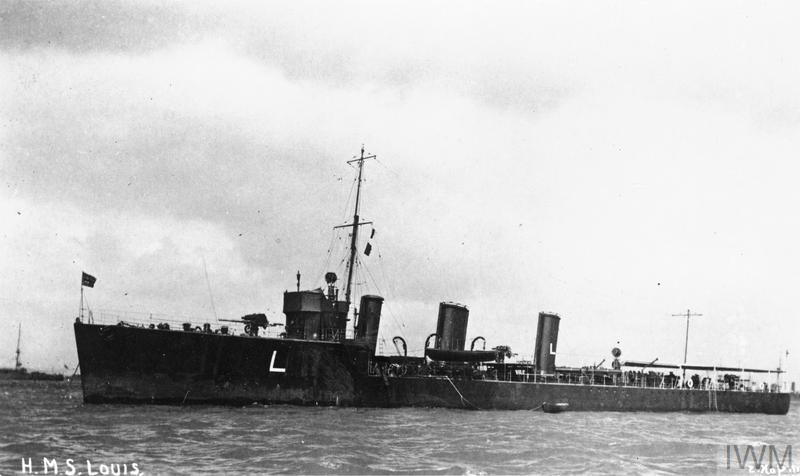
- HMS Louis

History

United Kingdom
- Name: HMS Louis
- Namesake: Sir Thomas Louis
- Builder: Fairfield Shipbuilding and Engineering Company
- Launched: 30 December 1913
- Fate: Wrecked 31 October 1915

General characteristics
- Class & type: Laforey-class destroyer
- Displacement: 965–1,010 long tons (980–1,026 t)
- Length: 268 ft 10 in (81.94 m) o/a
- Beam: 27 ft 8 in (8.43 m)
- Draught: 10 ft 6 in (3.20 m)
- Installed power: 24,500 shp (18,300 kW); 4 × Yarrow boilers
- Propulsion: 2 Shafts; 2 steam turbines
- Speed: 29 knots (54 km/h; 33 mph)
- Range: 1,720 nmi (3,190 km; 1,980 mi) at 15 knots (28 km/h; 17 mph)
- Complement: 74
- Armament: 3 × QF 4-inch (102 mm) Mark IV guns; 2 × twin 21-inch (533 mm) torpedo tubes

HMS Louis was a Laforey-class destroyer built for the British Royal Navy during the 1910s. She participated in the Dardanelles campaign, during which she was wrecked in Suvla Bay in 1915.

== Description ==
The Laforey class were improved and faster versions of the preceding Acasta class. They displaced 965–1,010 long tons (980–1,026 t). The ships had an overall length of 268 feet 10 inches (81.9 m), a beam of 27 feet 8 inches (8.4 m) and a draught of 10 feet 6 inches (3.2 m). Louis was powered by two Brown-Curtis direct-drive steam turbines, each driving one propeller shaft, using steam provided by four Yarrow boilers. The turbines developed a total of 24,500 shaft horsepower (18,300 kW) and gave a maximum speed of 29 knots (54 km/h; 33 mph). The ships carried a maximum of 280 long tons (280 t) of fuel oil that gave them a range of 1,750 nautical miles (3,240 km; 2,010 mi) at 15 knots (28 km/h; 17 mph). The ships' complement was 74 officers and ratings.

The ships were armed with three single QF 4-inch (102 mm) Mark IV guns. The ships were also fitted with two above-water twin mounts for 21-inch (533 mm) torpedoes. They were equipped with rails to carry four Vickers Elia Mk IV mines, although these rails were never used.

== Construction and service ==
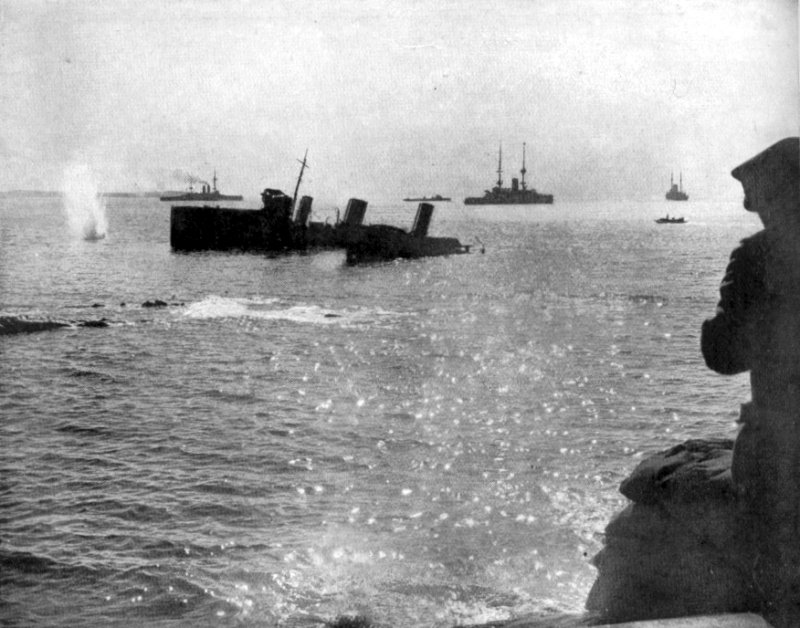
HMS Louis stranded at Suvla Bay

Laid down as Talisman, the ship was renamed on 30 September 1913 to Louis before being launched. Built by Fairfield Shipbuilding and Engineering Company, Govan (Yard No 491) and launched 30 December 1913, she was wrecked in Suvla Bay on 31 October 1915 during the Dardanelles campaign. The wreck was destroyed by Ottoman coastal artillery.

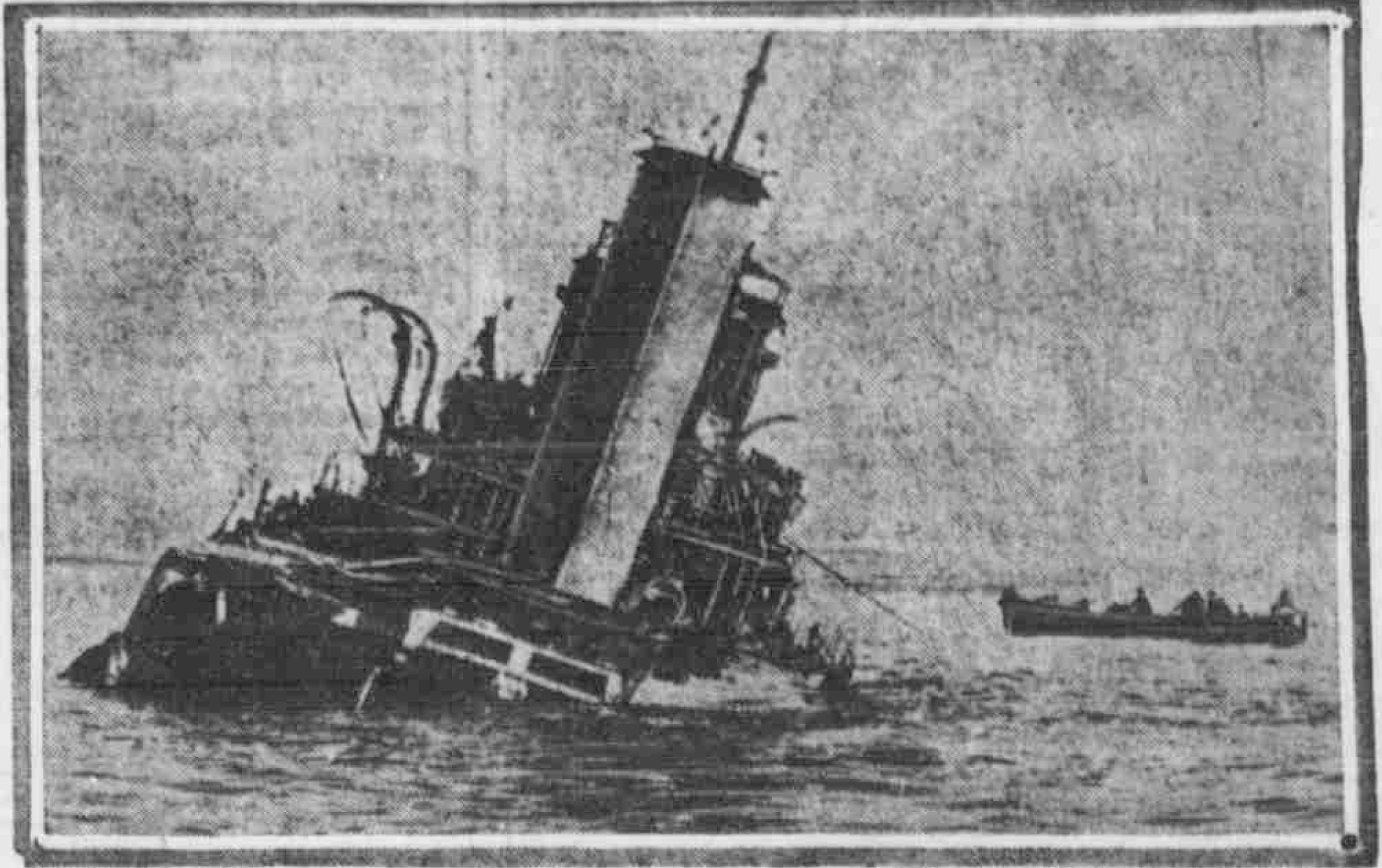
Louis stranded

== Bibliography ==
- Colledge, J. J.; Warlow, Ben (2006) [1969]. Ships of the Royal Navy: The Complete Record of All Fighting Ships of the Royal Navy from the 15th Century to the Present (3rd Rev ed.). London: Chatham Publishing. ISBN 978-1-86176-281-8. OCLC 67375475.
- Dittmar, F.J. & Colledge, J.J. (1972). British Warships 1914–1919. Shepperton, UK: Ian Allan. ISBN 0-7110-0380-7.
- Friedman, Norman (2009). British Destroyers: From Earliest Days to the Second World War. Barnsley, UK: Seaforth Publishing. ISBN 978-1-84832-049-9.
- Gardiner, Robert & Gray, Randal (1985). Conway's All The World's Fighting Ships 1906–1921. London: Conway Maritime Press. ISBN 0-85177-245-5.
