= Talisman UUV =

Autonomous unmanned mini-sub by BAE Systems

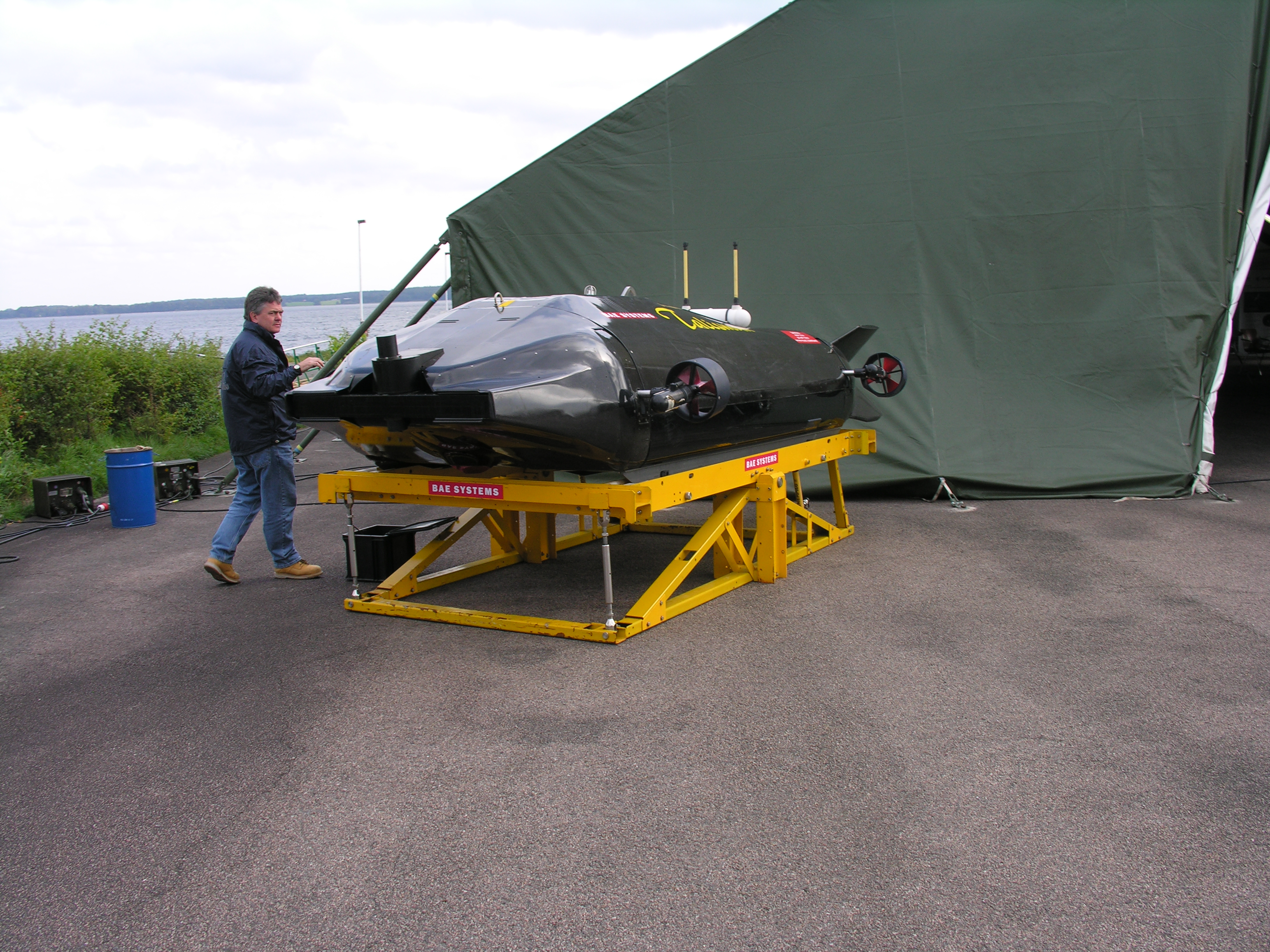
UUV TALISMAN of BAE System

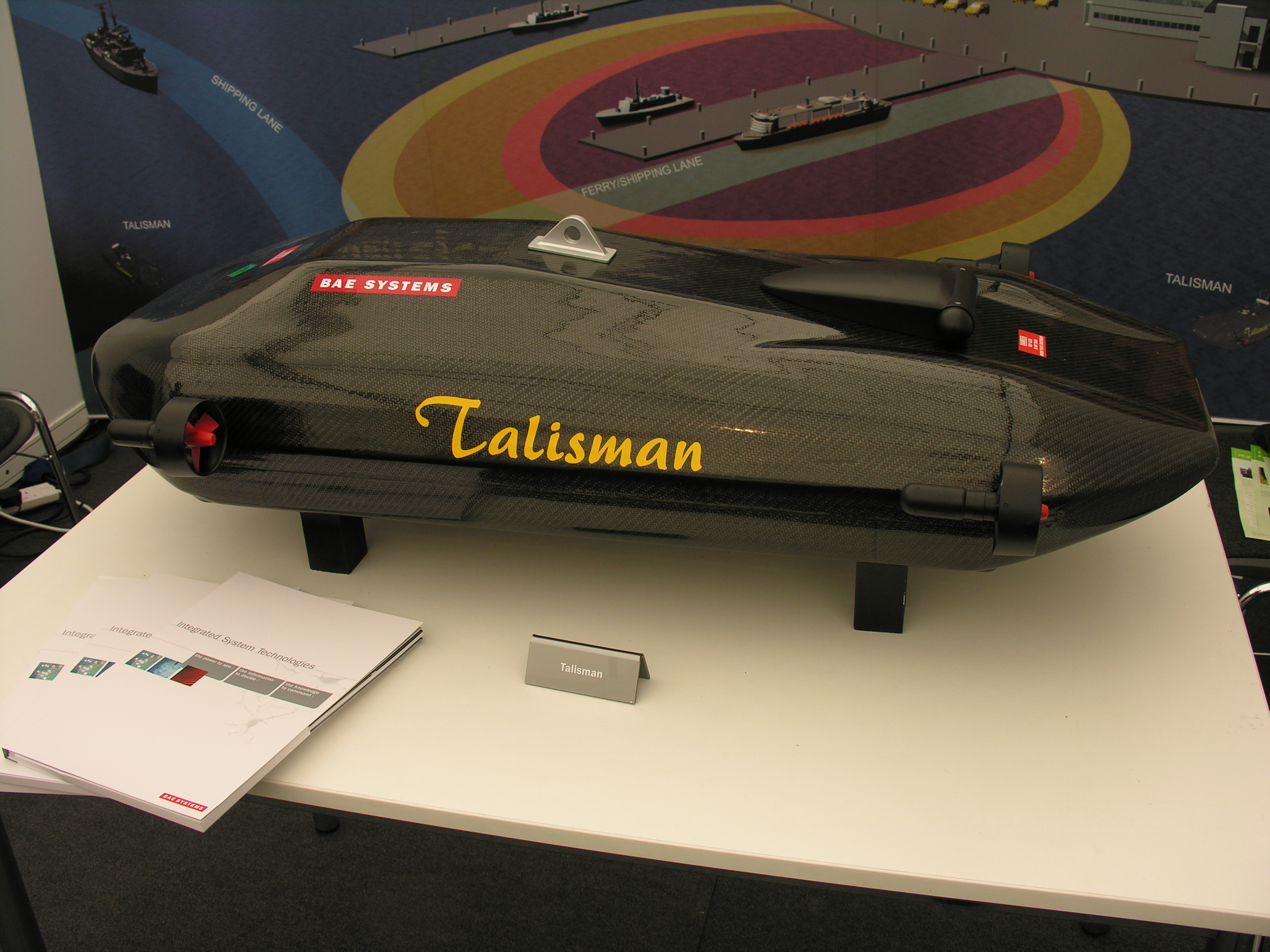
UUV TALISMAN model (BAE System)

The Talisman UUV is a fully autonomous unmanned mini-sub designed and made by BAE Systems. It has the capability to perform shoreline reconnaissance when the risks may be deemed too high, or conditions unsuitable, for human operators.

The Talisman system comprises a vehicle and remote control console. The vehicle can be re-programmed in mid-mission by satellite and features a carbon fibre hull giving it a stealth-like profile and low observability. Talisman can carry a wide variety of payloads, such as image capture, environmental sensors or mine counter measures.

== Programme history ==
The Talisman programme was launched in late 2004, and was developed and managed by BAE Systems Underwater Systems and went from paper to initial trials in less than a year.

Talisman has undergone a series of trials in the Irish Sea, with 100 per cent success rate. During further trials in late 2006, Talisman has become the first UUV to successfully fire and control weapons at sea during trials off the South Coast of England.

The first remote sea launch of the Archerfish mine disposal system from Talisman was successfully completed during the trials. The mine neutraliser then acquired Talisman and subsequently simulated target eradication. In another deployment, also from the Talisman UUV, Archerfish successfully identified and acquired BAE Systems' versatile exercise mine system (VEMS).

== The vehicle ==
The Talisman vehicle is based on an innovatively shaped carbon fibre composite hull, with internal pressure vessels containing the electronics systems and payload. The stealthy hull design was based on BAE Systems’ aircraft technology. The vehicle weighs 1800kg, is approximately 4.5m long by 2.5m wide, can dive to 300m and has a top speed of 5 knots (9 km/h).

It is fitted with vectorable thruster pods, which allow it to manoeuvre very accurately in difficult conditions, including strong currents, and over an extended period of time: the Talisman can be deployed 50 miles offshore and remain in operation for 24 hours. The precise handling in all directions comes from six thrusters, two at the front, and four at the back in two pairs. A rotary actuator is used to vector each pair of thrusters and to operate the hydroplanes.

Talisman has been designed with a software architecture, which allows easy and rapid re-configuration of the mission systems. All mission parameters are pre-settable before launch, for full autonomous operation, with the possibility of operator intervention throughout the mission.

Communications to and from the vehicle are via RF while the vehicle is surfaced and via acoustic communications systems when the vehicle is underwater.

== Payloads ==
As standard the vehicle is equipped with a suite of environmental sensors. Other payloads are mission or role specific and can include sonar systems, mine countermeasures and even other UUVs such as Archerfish.

== See also ==
- Autonomous Underwater Vehicle
- Remotely operated vehicle
- Submarine
- Submersible
