= Battle of La Guaira (1812) =

Coordinates: 10°36′0″N 66°55′59″W

- Part of the War of 1812
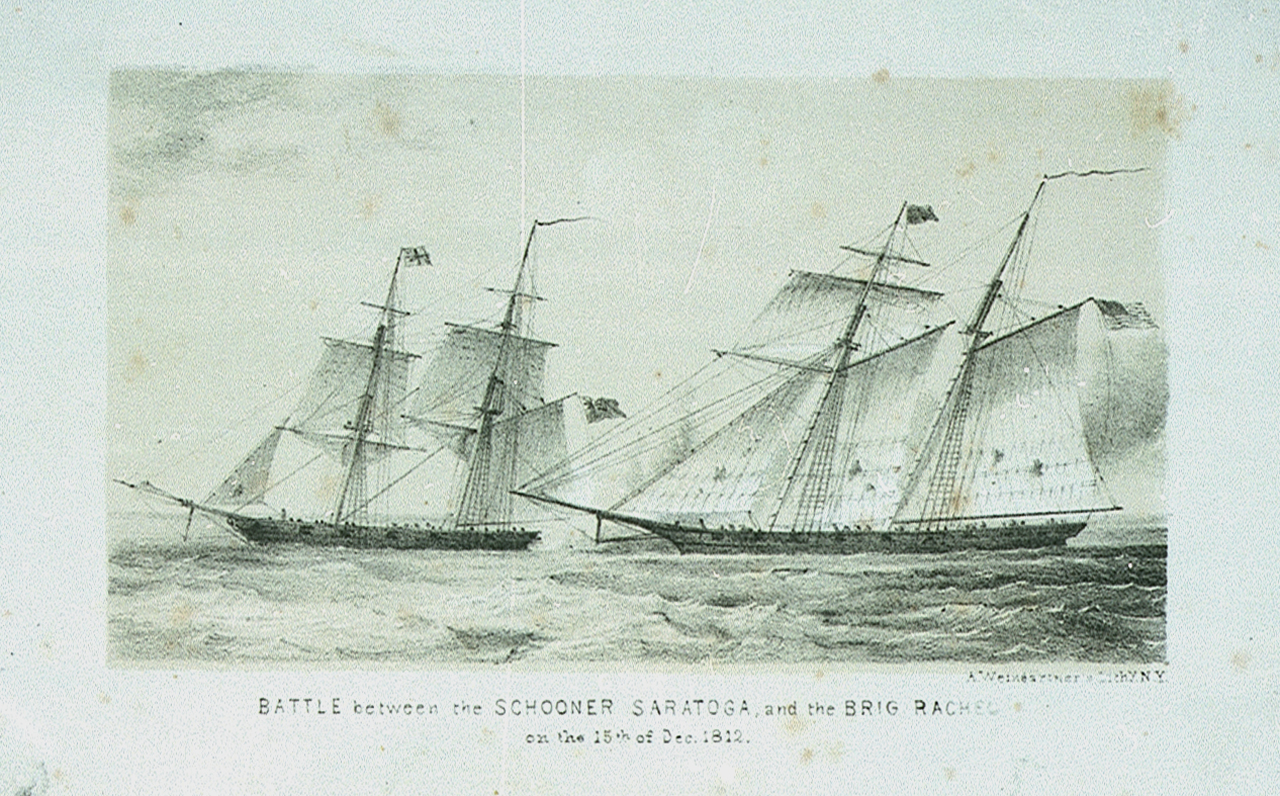
- Battle between Saratoga and Rachel
Date	11 December 1812
Location	off La Guaira, Venezuela, Caribbean Sea
Result	American victory

Belligerents
United States	United Kingdom

Commanders and leaders
Charles W. Wooster	(United Kingdom) Alexander †

Strength
1 schooner	1 brig

Casualties and losses
2 wounded 1 schooner damaged	3 killed 1 wounded 31 captured 1 brig captured

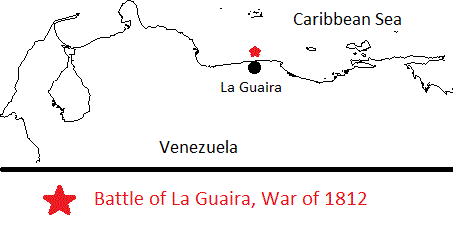

The Battle of La Guaira was a naval engagement fought in the Caribbean Sea on 11 December 1812 during the war between Britain and the United States. An American privateer captured a British letter of marque at the Spanish port of La Guaira in Venezuela.

== Battle ==
On 10 December while on a commerce raiding cruise, the American schooner Saratoga, of 16 guns and 140 men under Captain Charles Whiting Wooster anchored off La Guaira. After Wooster arrived the American consul warned Wooster that if he remained in port, the Spanish garrison would sink his ship with their shore batteries. The Americans withdrew out of range but remained off the city. That same day Saratoga captured a British schooner and sent her as a prize back to the United States.

On the following morning as a heavy fog cleared, the Americans spotted an incoming brig. After the engagement it turned out that she was the letter of marque Rachel, originally commanded by Captain N. Dalmahoy (or Dalmarhoy), of 23793/94 tons burthen, mounting fourteen long 9-pounders with a crew of thirty-six men. She had been at sea for 57 days. Dalmahoy had died two weeks before the battle so her first mate, named Alexander, was captain.

Immediately after spotting the British, Saratoga sailed to intercept but it took two hours for her to close to firing range. The Spanish colonists expected the arrival of Rachel and so hundreds of the colonists rushed to the beaches to observe the engagement. When the range closed the two vessels began tacking towards land, Saratoga opened fire while 5 miles (8.0 km) off the port, firing her starboard bow gun. The British answered with shots from their port quarter guns until both ships were side by side. For over half an hour the two vessels dueled but the fighting ended when Rachel's fire weakened. After volleys of small arms fire had driven the British sailors below decks, the Americans closed in and boarded. The British had two men killed, including Alexander, and two men wounded, one of whom died shortly thereafter; only two men from Saratoga were wounded.

The next day, being short of water, Wooster released twenty-seven of the prisoners and sent them into La Guaira in a longboat. He kept four of the prisoners on Rachel and two on Saratoga.

== Aftermath ==
The next day HMS Fawn, under the command of Captain Thomas Fellowes, encountered Rachel and captured her, together with the 12-man prize crew of Americans. The British took the Americans on board Fawn and put a six-man prize crew on board Rachel, which they sent her into Jamaica, where the Vice admiralty court condemned her as a prize. Fawn went into La Guaira and picked up Rachel's crew, all of whom agreed to serve on Fawn, though some apparently deserted shortly thereafter.
