= Admiral Fellowes =

Admiral Fellowes may refer to:

- Charles Fellowes (1823–1886), British Royal Navy vice admiral
- Thomas Fellowes (Royal Navy officer, born 1778) (1778–1853), British Royal Navy rear admiral
- Thomas Fellowes (Royal Navy officer, born 1827) (1827–1923), British Royal Navy rear admiral
