= Henry Bruce (Royal Navy officer) =

Royal Navy Admiral; Admiral Superintendent of Rosyth Dockyard (1862–1948)

Admiral Sir Henry Bruce KCB MVO
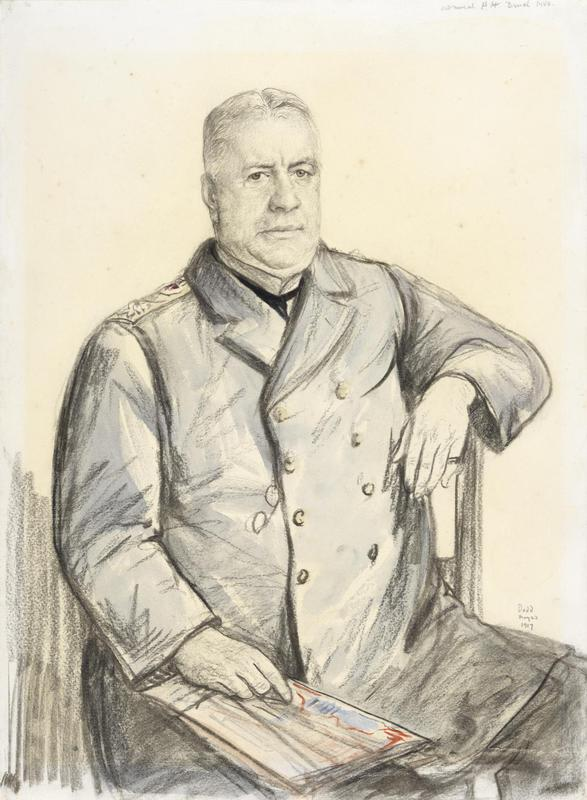
- 1915 portrait by Francis Dodd

Commodore-Superintendent/Admiral-Superintendent of Rosyth Dockyard
- In office 1915–1920

Commanding Officer of HMS Hercules
- In office 1913–1915

Personal details
- Born: Henry Harvey Bruce; 8 May 1862 Stoke Damerel, Devonport, Devon, England
- Died: 14 September 1948 (aged 86) Eaton Square, London, England

Admiral Sir Henry Harvey Bruce KCB MVO (8 May 1862 – 14 September 1948) was a British Royal Navy officer.

Bruce was born in Stoke Damerel, Devonport, Devon, the son of Commander Sir Thomas Bruce, who later became superintendent of packets at Dover. He followed his father into the navy as a cadet at HMS Britannia in 1875. His first sea service was in HMS Black Prince, flagship of the Channel Squadron and the second ironclad battleship in the Royal Navy. He then joined the frigate HMS Raleigh in the Mediterranean as a midshipman, followed by HMS Monarch, the first turret ship, from November 1879, taking part in the Anglo-Egyptian War of 1882. He was promoted sub-lieutenant in June 1882, went to the Royal Naval College, Greenwich in August 1882, and in 1883 was appointed to the gunboat HMS Swinger in Australia. He remained in her until 1887, having been promoted lieutenant in December 1884. In February 1888 he joined the cruiser HMS Porpoise on the China Station and in August 1891 he went to the sloop-of-war HMS Beagle on the North American Station. In January 1894 he was appointed gunnery officer of the cruiser HMS Marathon on the East Indies Station, did the gunnery course at HMS Excellent, and in 1897 joined the cruiser HMS Sirius, carrying relief crews out to the Mediterranean.

In July 1898 he took command of the torpedo gunboat HMS Jason and was promoted commander in June 1901. He then successively commanded the troopship HMS Tyne in the Mediterranean and the cruiser HMS Medea in the Home Fleet. In 1905 he was appointed naval officer-in-charge at Bermuda. Later the same year he was promoted captain and took command of the destroyer depot ship HMS Blenheim, followed by the light cruiser HMS Arrogant in the Atlantic Fleet and the battleship HMS Prince George. In 1911 he took command of the cruiser HMS Defence, escorting the King and Queen to India and back for the Delhi Durbar, for which he was appointed Member of the Royal Victorian Order (MVO). In 1913 he took command of the battleship HMS Hercules in the 1st Battle Squadron, and commanded her in the early stages of the First World War.

In 1915 he was appointed the first commodore-superintendent of Rosyth Dockyard and was responsible for its development over the five years he held command, being promoted rear-admiral in April 1917. He was appointed Knight Commander of the Order of the Bath (KCB) in the 1920 New Year Honours, having already been appointed Companion of the Order of the Bath (CB). He retired as a vice-admiral in 1922 and was promoted admiral on the retired list in 1926.

Bruce was knocked down by a car in London on 18 August 1948 and died from his injuries at his home in Eaton Square a month later.

Military offices
Preceded by First incumbent	Commodore-Superintendent/Admiral-Superintendent, Rosyth Dockyard; 1915–1920	Succeeded by Rear-Admiral Sir John Green
