= John Hext =

Royal Navy Rear-Admiral (1842–1924)

Rear-Admiral Sir John Hext KCIE
- Born: 14 October 1842; Morval, Cornwall
- Died: 8 May 1924 (aged 81); Newton Abbot, Devon
- Military career
- Allegiance: United Kingdom
- Branch: Royal Navy
- Service years: 1857–1889
- Rank: Rear-Admiral
- Commands: HMS Decoy; HMS Cruiser; HMS St Vincent; HMS Dryad; Royal Indian Marine
- Conflicts: Ashanti war Egyptian War; Burma annexation war
- Awards: Knight Commander of Order of the Indian Empire

Rear-Admiral Sir John Hext KCIE (14 October 1842 – 8 May 1924) was a British Royal Navy officer and director of the Royal Indian Marine for 15 years.

== Early career ==
Hext was born on 14 October 1842 the eldest son of the Reverend J.H. Hext, who was vicar of Morval, Cornwall. He joined the Royal Navy in 1857 and his first appointment was to the frigate HMS Greyhound in the West Indies. Gaining his commission as a Lieutenant on 16 June 1865 he was appointed to HMS Perseus. In 1872 he gained his first command, HMS Decoy, a composite gunboat which was based at the Cape of Good Hope and West Africa Station.

== Ashanti War, Mediterranean and Portsmouth ==
While in command of the Decoy he was involved in the Ashanti war, on 13 June 1873 he led the boat expedition at Eliman and also landed at Bootey where the boat-crews destroyed the native village. He received the Ashanti Medal and was mentioned in dispatches for his actions and also promoted to Commander on 31 March 1874. In 1875, he became commander of the sloop HMS Cruiser in the Mediterranean which became a training ship, With his new experience of training he was appointed to command the training ship HMS St. Vincent located at Portsmouth harbour.

== East Indies, Egyptian War, Anglo-Burmese War and Director of the Indian Marine ==
He returned to sea duty in the East Indies on the sloop HMS Dryad and was promoted to captain on 30 June 1882. He was involved in the Egyptian War of 1882 in the transport service at Suez, and was awarded the Order of the Medjidie, Third Class. In February 1883 he was selected to be Director of Marine working for the Government of India; he originally was appointed for five years; he held the post for 15 years. In January 1886 he was also appointed an honorary aide-de-camp to the viceroy of India. He was received thanks from the Indian government for his work during the Burma annexation war of 1885–1886.

He was appointed a Commander of the Order of the Indian Empire in 1897 for his work, during the Diamond Jubilee of Queen Victoria he was knighted when he was promoted to a Knight Commander of the Order of the Indian Empire, and also promoted to rear-admiral on the retired list on 10 May, although he had been on the retired list since 1889. Hext returned to England as continued in his interest in Naval affairs and was one of the commissioners appointed to look at the administration of the Port of London. He died at home at Newton Abbot on 8 May 1924 aged 81.

== Family life ==
Hext had married Lilian Mary Mitchell in 1874; she died in 1893. He married again in 1893 to Jean Davidson; she died in 1913.
