= HMS Swinger =

Six ships of the Royal Navy have been named HMS Swinger:

- HMS Swinger (1794), a 14-gun (later 12-gun) Conquest-class gun brig launched at Limehouse in 1794 and sold in 1802.
- HMS Swinger (1798), a 6-gun gunvessel purchased locally in Honduras in 1798, and whose fate in unknown.
- HMS Swinger (1804), a 12-gun Archer-class gun brig launched at Topsham in 1804 and broken up in June 1812.
- HMS Swinger (1813), a 12-gun Bold-class gun brig launched at Bridport in 1813, converted to a mooring lighter in 1829 and broken up in 1877.
- HMS Swinger (1855), a 4-gun Dapper-class gunboat launched at Northfleet in 1855 and broken up in 1864.
- HMS Swinger (1872), a 4-gun Ariel-class gunboat launched at Pembroke Dockyard in 1872, hulked in 1895 and sold in 1924.
