= James Fellowes (physician) =

British military physician

Sir James Fellowes FRS FRSE FRCP

Inspector of Hospitals, British Army
- In office April 1813 – October 1814

Personal details
- Born: c. 1771 Edinburgh, Scotland
- Died: 30 December 1857 Havant, Hampshire, England
- Occupation: Military physician

Sir James Fellowes (c.1771—30 December 1857, Langstone Cottage, near Havant, Hampshire) was a British military physician. He became head of the British Army's medical staff in the Peninsular War, and was also literary executor to Hester Thrale.

== Life ==
Fellowes was born in Edinburgh the third son of William Fellowes, physician-extraordinary to the prince regent - he was elder brother to the naval captain Thomas Fellowes. He was educated at Rugby School before spending time in the British Army's medical department, becoming surgeon's mate in June 1794. He then took his medical degree at Peterhouse and Gonville and Caius College at the University of Cambridge, along with London lectures from George Fordyce and Andrew Marshal and time in Edinburgh, finally graduating MD in 1803.

October 1795 saw him made physician to the forces, accompanying Admiral Christian's fleet to Santo Domingo and being sent to Gibraltar in 1804 to treat a contagious fever outbreak there. In April 1806 he came back to England, where in 1809 George III knighted him and appointed him chief of the medical department of the army at Cádiz, then in the midst of the Peninsular War. He then became deputy inspector (March 1813) then inspector (April 1813) of hospitals before retiring on half pay in 1814. Having been a first-hand eyewitness of epidemics at Cádiz, Málaga and Gibraltar, he then published Reports of the pestilential disorder of Andalusia, which appeared at Cádiz in the years 1800, 1804, 1810, and 1813 (1815). Arthur Wellesley appointed Fellowes deputy county lieutenant for Hampshire and Mrs Piozzi left Fellowes her manuscripts and copies of her writings with handwritten notes in 1821, with Fellowes becoming her literary executor.

== Fellowships ==
He was elected to the Royal Society of Edinburgh in 1800, the Royal College of Physicians in 1805 and the Royal Society in 1816.

== Marriage and issue ==
In 1816, he married Elizabeth, the eldest daughter of Joseph James, of Adbury House, Hampshire, and sister-in-law to the geologist William Henry Fitton. They had a son, Thomas Fellowes.

== Notes ==
- Herrick, Claire E. J. "Fellowes, James". Oxford Dictionary of National Biography (online ed.). Oxford University Press. doi:10.1093/ref:odnb/9265. (Subscription, Wikipedia Library access or UK public library membership required.)
