= Compton Domvile (Royal Navy officer) =

Royal Navy Admiral (1842–1924)

Admiral Sir Compton Domvile GCB GCVO
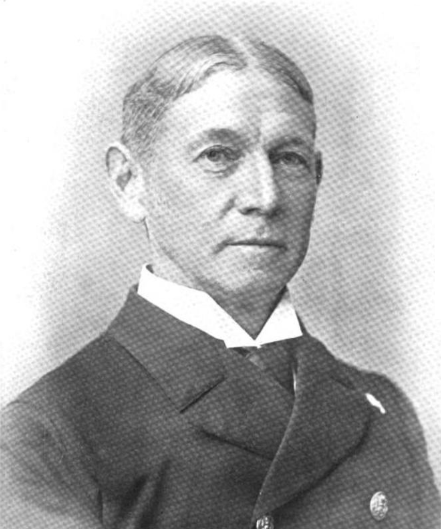
- Born: 10 October 1842
- Died: 19 November 1924 (aged 82)
- Military career
- Allegiance: United Kingdom
- Branch: Royal Navy
- Service years: 1856–1905
- Rank: Admiral
- Commands: HMS Algerine; HMS Dryad; Royal Naval College, Greenwich; HMS Dido; HMS Temeraire; HMS Excellent; Commander-in-Chief of the Mediterranean Fleet
- Awards: Knight Grand Cross of the Royal Victorian Order; Knight Grand Cross of the Order of the Bath; Knight Grand Cross of the Order of the Saviour of Greece; 1st Class in Brilliants of the Order of the Medjidie; Naval aide-de-camp to Queen Victoria

Admiral Sir Compton Edward Domvile, GCB, GCVO (10 October 1842 – 19 November 1924) was a distinguished Royal Navy officer in the Edwardian and Victorian eras.

== Early life ==
Compton Domvile was born on 10 October 1842 to Henry Barry Domvile (1813–1843) and Frances Domvile (née Winnington-Ingram) (d 1884). He was educated at the Royal Academy, Gosport.

== Career ==
=== Early career ===
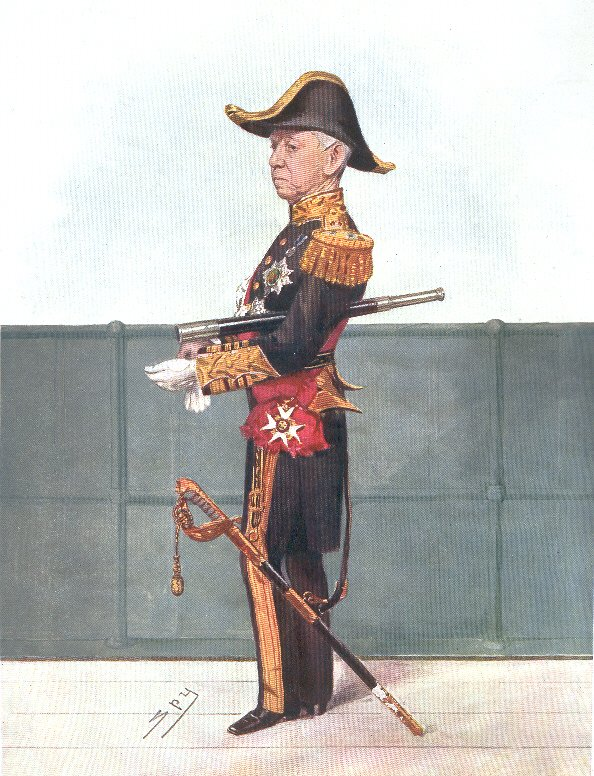
Admiral Sir Compton Domvile in Vanity Fair of London, 1906, by Sir Leslie Ward

Compton Domvile joined the Royal Navy in 1856. He served in the Royal Yacht and was promoted to lieutenant on 28 October 1862. He commanded the steam-gunboat HMS Algerine from 16 April 1866 and was promoted to commander on 2 September 1868 for service against piracy.

=== HMS Dryad ===
On 3 August 1874 he became captain of the screw sloop HMS Dryad from commissioning at Devonport. Dryad served on the North America and West Indies Station until December 1877. Domvile was promoted to captain on 27 March 1876, whilst serving in Dryad. Commander John Edward Stokes replaced him as Dryad's captain some time in 1877.

=== HMS Dido ===
He became captain of the Royal Naval College, Greenwich until 19 September 1879, followed by a return to sea as captain of the steam corvette HMS Dido, replacing Captain Arthur Richard Wright who had died on 19 August 1879. Dido served on the west coast of Africa, including service in the first Boer War (1880–1881). After the Battle of Laing's Nek, Dido contributed 50 men and two field guns to a Naval Brigade, which went to the front under Lieutenant Henry Ogle. This brigade shared in the disaster at the Battle of Majuba Hill on 27 February, where Dido lost 3 killed and 3 wounded. Captain Domvile took charge of the Naval Brigade, but no further action took place before a peace was concluded.

In October 1881, Dido crossed the Atlantic and joined the North America and West Indies squadron, with Domvile serving as an acting commodore in Jamaica in 1882. She was paid off at Barbados on 16 February 1883.

=== Flag rank ===
From 1884 to 1886 Domville was the captain of HMS Temeraire in the Mediterranean, and from there he went to become the captain of the stone frigate (shore establishment) HMS Excellent, the gunnery school at Portsmouth.

In 1888, Domvile became naval aide-de-camp to Queen Victoria, and served on the Ordnance Committee from 1890 to 1891. On 4 January 1891 he was promoted to rear-admiral and was appointed Director of Naval Ordnance from 1891 to 1894. He went to the Mediterranean as second-in-command of the Mediterranean Fleet from 1894 to 1896, and on promotion to vice-admiral on 23 February 1897, he was appointed Superintendent of Naval Reserves, based on the HMS Alexandra as his flagship. In 1898 he was appointed as a Knight Commander of the Order of the Bath.

=== Commander-in-Chief, Mediterranean Fleet ===
On 25 January 1902 he was promoted to admiral, and later that year replaced Jackie Fisher as commander-in-chief of the Mediterranean Fleet, then Britain's largest fleet. He was received in audience at Buckingham Palace by King Edward VII on 26 May, departed for the Mediterranean the following week, and took up the position on 4 June. His flagship in the Mediterranean was the newly commissioned battleship HMS Bulwark, on which he had hoisted his flag on 1 May 1902 at Devonport.

In 1903 he was appointed a Knight of the Grand Cross of the Royal Victorian Order, and in 1904 the Knight of the Grand Cross of the Order of the Bath. He was also appointed Knight Grand Cross of the Order of the Saviour of Greece, and 1st Class in Brilliants of the Medijie. He served in the Mediterranean until 1905.

== Death ==
He died on 19 November 1924.

== Family ==
Compton married on 3 November 1876 Isabella Peel, the daughter of Captain Edmund Yates Peel, son of Jonathan Peel PC. They had five children:

- Adelaide Mary Domvile (b 1877, died unmarried)
- Admiral Sir Barry Edward Domvile, KBE, CB, CMG (1878–1971), who followed his father in the Royal Navy, and after a distinguished career became a leading British fascist.
- Capt. Archibald Compton Winnington Domvile (19 May 1884 – 1959); Sara Palma Guzman (d. 28 August 1938), daughter of Don Gabriel Palma Guzman, President of the Supreme Court of Chile. They had one daughter, Margaret Domvile (b. 17 May 1916).
- Georgiana Isabella Francis Domvile (25 May 1888 – 23 Dec. 1967); married Lt.-Col. Dudley George Blois, son of Sir John Ralph Blois, 8th Baronet. They had a son, John, and a daughter, Jane. John became a Wing Commander in the Royal Air Force, and married Elizabeth Catharine Maxwell, daughter of Rear-Adm. Sir Wellwood George Courtenay Maxwell and Elizabeth Cavendish, granddaughter of William George Cavendish, 2nd Baron Chesham and also Sir William Baillie, 1st Baronet.
- May Louise Domvile (3 Apr 1893 – 25 July 1970). She married Cosmo George Romilly (20 June 1890 – 11 Aug 1915), great grandson of Sir Samuel Romilly and also John Russell, 6th Duke of Bedford. He was killed during the First World War, and nine years later married Lt.-Col. Richard Laurence Stapylton Pemberton. Both marriages were without issue.

Military offices
Preceded by Sir John Fisher	Commander-in-Chief, Mediterranean Fleet; 1902–1905	Succeeded by Lord Charles Beresford
