= HMS Fawn (1807) =

Sloop of the Royal Navy

Fawn
- Fawn

History

United Kingdom
- Name: HMS Fawn
- Ordered: 19 October 1805
- Builder: Thomas Owen, Topsham, Devon
- Laid down: December 1805
- Launched: 22 April 1807
- Commissioned: May 1807
- Honours and awards: Naval General Service Medal (NGSM), with clasps: "Martinique"; "25 July Boat Service 1809"; "Guadaloupe"
- Fate: Sold 20 August 1818

United Kingdom
- Name: Fawn
- Owner: 1820-1835: John Lydekker; 1836-1844:Cruikshank
- Acquired: By purchase
- Fate: Broken up 1844

General characteristics
- Class & type: Cormorant-class ship-sloop
- Tons burthen: 42344/94, or 430, or 445 (bm); 108 ft 7 in (33.10 m) (overall); 90 ft 11 3/4 in (27.730 m) (keel)
- Beam: 29 ft 7 in (9.02 m)
- Depth of hold: 9 ft 0 in (2.74 m)
- Sail plan: Sloop
- Complement: 121
- Armament: Upper deck: 16 × 32-pounder carronades; QD: 6 × 18-pounder carronades; Fc: 2 × 6-pounder guns + 2 × 18-pounder carronades

HMS Fawn was a Cormorant-class ship-sloop of the British Royal Navy, launched in 1807. Before she was sold in 1818, she captured one privateer and destroyed another, and participated in three campaigns. In all, her crew qualified for three clasps to the Naval General Service medal (NGSM). After the Royal Navy sold her in 1818, she became a whaler. She then made seven whaling voyages to the Pacific, and especially to the waters off New Zealand, between 1820 and 1844. She was broken up on her return from her last voyage.

== Naval career ==
Fawn was commissioned in May 1807, under Commander Fasham Roby, who sailed her for the Leeward Islands on 11 November. On 15 December 1807, she arrived at Barbados with the news of war with Denmark. Admiral Sir Alexander Cochrane had been in readiness since 2 September, and immediately set sail for the Danish West Indies in his flagship, HMS Belleisle, bringing with him a squadron of warships, including Fawn, and troops under the overall army commander, General Henry Boyer. The British captured St Thomas and Santa Cruz; the Danes did not resist and the invasion was bloodless. (Note: In 1816, the two commanders in chief each received £1293 3s 5 3/4d in prize money. A naval captain or commander, such as Roby, received a first-class share, which was worth £398 10 3 1/2d. A fifth-class share, that of a seaman, was worth £1 18s 10d.)

Commander Roby died in April 1808, a year after his wife had died in England. Commander Nevinson de Courcy replaced Roby on 15 April. Some time after Astraea wrecked on a reef off Anegada on 23 March, Fawn and the two 32-gun frigates Jason and Galatea arrived and engaged in salvage attempts. The British abandoned the wreck on 24 June.

Around this time, Commander George Albert Crofton, late of Observateur, replaced de Courcy.

On 28 (or 20) May, Lieutenant James Robertson (Acting), took two of Fawn's boats on a cutting out expedition to capture Spanish privateer schooner and three merchant vessels anchored under the protection of two shore batteries at the northeast end of Porto Rico. The crew of the schooner ran her ashore and abandoned her. To get her off Robertson had to nail sheet lead over holes in her bow. As she pulled away he had the prize crew fire her guns at the privateersmen who were firing small arms from the shore. Suddenly the magazine on the prize exploded, throwing all but Robertson and two seamen into the water. The explosion killed one man, and injured four others. Still, that evening Robertson was able to rejoin Fawn with the schooner and the three merchant vessels. A squall the next day sank the captured schooner, killing five men. (Note: Head money for the 25-man crew of the privateer was paid in August 1825. A first-class share was worth £29 13s 3d; a fifth-class share was worth 5s 2 1/4d.)

A little over a month and a half later, on 17 July, Fawn returned to the same location. This time Robertson had three boats from Fawn under his command, as well as two boats from Pultusk. Commander Charles Napier accompanied the operation. Although Napier outranked Robertson, Napier was only accompanying Robertson to gain a knowledge of the coast and agreed that he would have the status of a volunteer, and that Robertson would be responsible for the operation. The British cut out a Spanish merchant schooner from under the guns of two batteries, and then Robertson and Napier landed and spiked the guns in one battery and rendered the guns' carriages unusable.

In January–February 1809, Fawn participated in the invasion of Martinique. Four decades later the operation was among the actions recognised by the clasp "Martinique" attached to the Naval General Service Medal (NGSM), awarded upon application to all British participants still living in 1847.

Fawn's boats, under the command of Lieutenant Morgan, engaged a cutter and the schooner Guadeloupe on 25 July, and captured the schooner. In 1847, the Admiralty authorized the NGSM medal with clasp "25 July Boat Service 1809" for the action. Despite this being an action meriting the award of the NGSM with clasp, there is no further information available about what transpired.

In August 1809, or so, Fawn recaptured Sir George Prevost and the American vessel George, Holmes, master, and brought them into Martinique on 2 September. Another report describes Sir George Prevost as a polacre ship and her captor as the French privateer Fine.

At the end of 1809, Fawn formed part of the squadron off Guadeloupe under Captain Volant Vashon Ballard of Blonde. On 25 September, Blonde, Fawn, and Scorpion sent their boats after an enemy vessel making for Basse-Terre. (Note: In his letter reporting the action, Ballard names one of the three vessels Facon. However Winfield has no record of any British naval vessel with the name Facon. A later head money notice makes clear that the vessel was Fawn.) To escape her pursuers, their quarry ran herself ashore in a bay between two batteries. The boat parties reached the French vessel despite cross-fire from the batteries and in the face of small arms fire from men on the beach. However, the British were unable to get the French vessel off. Instead, as she was bilged, they simply left. British casualties amounted to two men wounded from Blonde, one of whom lost an arm and the other of whom later died.

Fawn participated in the capture of Guadeloupe in January and February 1810. (Note: A first-class share of the prize money for Guadaloupe was worth £113 3s 1 1/4d; a sixth-class share, that of an ordinary seaman, was worth £1 9s 1 1/4d.) In 1847 the Admiralty awarded the Naval General Service Medal with clasp "Guadaloupe" to all surviving participants of the campaign.

Fawn then sailed to England. On 11 October 1810, Fawn captured a French privateer schooner after an "anxious" six-hour chase during which the quarry threw her guns overboard. The schooner was Temeraire, of ten guns and six large swivel guns, and a crew of 35 men. She was a new vessel, three days out of Brest, and had taken no prizes, though she was in the process of boarding a Pappenberg brig sailing from Dover when Fawn appeared on the scene. Fawn had captured Temeraire off The Lizard, and then sent her into Plymouth.

On 27 June 1811, the American ship George, M'Kirdy, master, which Fawn had detained, arrived in Yarmouth. About a week later, Fawn detained and sent into Yarmouth Sanderness, Jamerson, master, which had been sailing from Denmark.

Crofton received promotion to post captain on 1 Feb 1812. His replacement on 11 February, was Commander Thomas Fellowes.

In 1812 or so, the Admiralty reclassified Fawn as a post ship. Then on 28 June 1812, Fawn accompanied the Lisbon fleet as a convoy escort.

After cruising in the Channel for some time, Fawn proceeded to escort a fleet of merchantmen from Cork to Barbados. On their arrival in Carlisle Bay, Barbados, the masters of the vessels in the convoy gave Fellowes a letter thanking him "for the excellent arrangements he made to prevent separation, and for his very great attention to them during the voyage".

From Barbados, Fawn proceeded to the Jamaica station where she recaptured several British vessels.

The American privateers Lady Madison and Eagle, each of one gun and 50 men, captured Perthshire on 29 November, off Altavela, after a half-hour action in which Perthshire's master, M'Kinley, was killed. Perthshire had been sailing from Newfoundland to Falmouth, Jamaica, when the Americans captured her. Fawn recaptured Perthshire on 5 December, and took her into Jamaica. One source further describes Perthshire as a letter of marque of 14 guns, and carrying a cargo of fish and oil.

Fawn then was assigned the task of protecting the trade between Curaçao and the Spanish Main.

On 12 December, Fawn encountered Rachel and recaptured her, together with the 12-man prize crew of Americans. (The American privateer Saratoga had captured Rachel the day before in an action at La Guiara.) The British took the Americans on board Fawn and put a six-man prize crew on board Rachel, which they sent her into Jamaica, where the Vice admiralty court condemned her as a prize. Fawn went into La Guaira and picked up Rachel's crew, all of whom agreed to serve on Fawn, though some apparently deserted shortly thereafter.

On 9 January 1813, Fawn captured the Spanish brig Teneriffe and sent her into Port Cavello. From her Fellowes found out that her captor was one of three American privateers that had come from a rendezvous between Beata and Saint Domingo. Fawn set out in pursuit and on 10 January Fellowes sighted a strange vessel. After a long and arduous chase during which the batteries of Port Cavello fired on the privateer to prevent her entering, Fawn succeeded in chasing the American privateer Rosamond, of eight guns and 105 or 120 men, on shore. Rosamond ran on shore on Point Hicacos where her captain and 24 men drowned in attempting to reach the land. Rosamond had on board $100,000 in specie and valuable merchandize, the plunder of various English and Spanish vessels.

The Captain-General of the Caraccas then requested that Fellowes extend his patrol to the east side of the province of Cumana, "where the insurgents have landed at a place called Guiaia, paralyzing commerce, and obstructing the general supplies of provisions sent to the island of H[is] B[ritannic] M[ajesty] and seriously affecting the interests of his afflicted ally, the Spanish nation."

On 6 June, Fawn captured the privateer Havannah. (Note: A first-class share of the prize money was worth £233 11s 10 3/4d; a fifth-class share was worth £1 8s 0 1/2d.)

The Governor of Curaçao, Major-General Hodgson, also acknowledged Captain Fellowes' "zealous and active exertions;" and the merchants of that island presented him with a piece of place.

On 3 July, Bedford, Cyane, and Fawn left Jamaica, escorting a convoy of some 100 vessels for England. Bedford's portion of the convoy, some 467 vessels, arrived at the Isles of Scilly on 26 August; the vessels for the Bristol and St George's Channels had separated on 15 and 22 August, with Cyane and Fawn.

== Disposal ==
In October 1813, Fawn was paid off. At the news, the ship's company submitted the following letter to Fellowes:

Sir, "It is with the deepest regrette that we have this day learned that His Majesty's Ship under your Command is ordered to be paid off, as it deprives us of a Commander, we one, and all would wish to sail with. We beg leave. Sir! to state that your great attention to our Comforts in our different stations has left a grateful impression on our minds, and induces us to take the Liberty of soliciting the favour of serving in any Ship to which you may be appouited, we hope, Sir, that you will be pleased to Excuse this freedom as it proceeds from no other motive than our Gratitude to a Commander we so much Esteem and Respect. We have the honor to be (Sir) Your Very humble Servants, " The Ship's Company in General."

There follow 43 signatures.

Fawn remained in Ordinary until the Principal Officers and Commissioners of His Majesty's Navy offered "Fawn, of 26 guns and 424 tons", for sale at Plymouth on 13 August 1818. She sold to a Mr. Young for £1,470 on 20 August 1818.

== Whaler ==
Fawn, of 430 tons, built at Topsham in 1807, with Thomas Allen, master, and John Lydekker, owner, sailed on 5 February 1820, for Peru, on her first whaling voyage. She was at Valparaiso between 30 March and 24 April 1821, and was reported "all well" in March 1822. She returned to England 17 November with 650 casks of whale oil

Charles Dale was Fawn's master for her second whaling voyage. She left Britain on 3 June 1823. She was at Honolulu on 2 April 1824, from 26 to 29 March 1825, and again between 28 September and 17 October. At that time she had 2700 barrels of whale oil. She left for England via Tahiti, where she stopped between 17 November and 1 December. She arrived back in Britain on 9 April 1826 with 550 casks of whale oil.

With unchanged master or owner, Fawn left Britain on 15 August 1826, on her third whaling voyage, with destination the Sandwich Islands (Hawaiian Islands). She was reported to have arrived at Hawaii on 12 October 1827 with 1200 barrels of oil, and to there still on 10 November. She was at Tahiti on 20 November 1828, having been at Honolulu between 6 and 17 October. Fawn arrived back in Britain on 4 April 1829 with 500 casks and one tank.

Charles Dale and Fawn left Britain on 8 July 1829 on her fourth whaling voyage, with destination the Pacific Ocean. She was at Honolulu between 24 March and 23 April 1830 with 240 barrels. She was again at Honolulu between 20 October to 10 November, now with 1100 barrels. She was next reported to have been at Guam in March 1831, in company with Ranger, Lady Amherst, and Matilda. Fawn was reported to have been at the Moluccas in mid-1831 with 2200 barrels. From 16 October to 7 November, she was at Honolulu full, with 2600 barrels. She arrived back in Britain on 15 April 1832, with 700 cask.

Fawn's fifth whaling voyage was her last with Charles Dale as master and John Lydekker as owner. She left Britain on 18 July 1832. She was at Honolulu from 8 to 25 April 1833, with 150 barrels. She had been out 19 months when she was reported to have been at Bouka Bay on 15 January 1834, with 1100 barrels. She was also reported to have been off "Bayenwall Island" with 1050 barrels in mid-February. She was at Honolulu on 28 October with 1400 or 1450 barrels. She returned to Britain on 25 September 1835 with 450 casks.

For her sixth whaling voyage Fawn had a new master, Cruickshank. and a new master, Stephen Gardner (or Gardiner). Gardner sailed on 18 January 1836, bound for New Zealand. She was at Talcahuano, Chile, on 29 June 1836, and at Noohava 25 March 1837. Between 13 April and 17 May, she was at Honolulu with 300 barrels. She was again at Honolulu between 14 October to 8 November with 700 barrels. By 30 November she was at Fanning. She returned to Honolulu on 4 January 1838. She reached Port Ascension (Ascension Island?) on 20 April 1838, Guam on 12 May, and Woahoo (Oahu) on 12 October, by which time she had 1500 barrels. On 1 December, she was at Sydney. Homeward bound, she was at St David's Island on 12 February 1839, and in the Sunda Straits by 28 March. She returned to Britain on 24 July 1839.

Captain John Dun (or Dunn), was master of Fawn on her last whaling voyage. She left Britain on 15 April 1840, with destination New Zealand. She was at Akaroa on 11 February 1843, with 350 barrels of oil. She was next reported at Tahiti from 25 April to 6 May 1843. She returned to Britain on 15 July 1844.

== Fate ==
On her return to Britain Fawn was broken up.
