= Rachel (1810 ship) =

History

United Kingdom
- Name: Rachel
- Builder: Hilton
- Launched: 1810
- Fate: Last listed 1833

General characteristics
- Tons burthen: 237, or 23793/94, or 238 (bm)
- Sail plan: Brig
- Complement: 36
- Armament: 12 × 9-pounder guns

Rachael was launched in 1810 at Hilton (possibly South Hylton) or Sunderland, and apparently was initially registered and based at Greenock. In 1812, an American privateer captured her in a notable single-ship action, but the British Royal Navy recaptured her almost immediately. She then continued as a general trader and was last listed in 1833.

== Career ==
Rachel first appeared in Lloyd's Register (LR) with C.R.Lyon, master, M'Gowan, owner, and trade Greenock–Newfoundland.

War between the United Kingdom and the United States having broken out, Captain Ninian Dalmahoy acquired a letter of marque against the United States for Rachel, of Greenock. It is not clear when he assumed command of her. On 27 October 1812 Rachel, Dalmahoy, master, was in the Bay of Biscay, bound to La Guaira. Dalmahoy died on the voyage and as she arrived at La Guaira her first mate, named Alexander, was captain.

When she arrived off La Guaira she had been at sea for 57 days. At La Guaira on 11 December, she had the misfortune to encounter the American privateer schooner Saratoga, of 16 guns and 140 men.

After an engagement of about half an hour, Rachel struck. The British had two men killed, including Alexander, and two men wounded, one of whom died shortly thereafter; only two men from Saratoga were wounded. The next day, being short of water, the Americans released twenty-seven of the prisoners and sent them into La Guaira in a longboat. They kept four of the prisoners on Rachel and two on Saratoga.

On 12 (or 15) December HMS Fawn encountered Rachel and recaptured her, together with the 12-man prize crew of Americans. The British took the Americans on board Fawn and put a six-man prize crew on board Rachel, which they sent into Jamaica, where the Vice admiralty court condemned her as a prize. Fawn went into La Guaira and picked up Rachel's crew, all of whom agreed to serve on Fawn, though some apparently deserted shortly thereafter.

Rachel arrived back in the Clyde on 27 January 1814, and again, with M'Call, master, on 8 July 1814.

Year	Master	Owner	Trade	Source & notes
1815	D.Hogg	Watson & Co.	Greenock–Newfoundland	LR
1820	J.Davies; Mustard	Duff & Company	Plymouth–Jamaica	LR
1825	J.Cooper	Armstrong	Hull-Petersburg	LR; large repair 1820 & repairs 1821
1830	D.Irving	Armstrong	Exmouth–Quebec	LR; good repair 1828 & keel and damage repair 1829
1833	D.Irving	Armstrong	Cork–Montreal	LR; good repair 1828 & keel and damage repair 1829

== Fate ==
Rachel was last listed in 1833.
