= Thomas Fellowes (Royal Navy officer, born 1827) =

English officer in the Royal Navy

Rear-Admiral Sir Thomas Fellowes KCB DL
- The Naval Brigade at Goon-Goona. The mounted figure is most likely to be Captain Fellowes
- Born: Thomas Hounsom Butler Fellowes; 19 October 1827; Burghclere, Hampshire, England
- Died: 26 March 1923 (aged 95); Stevenage, Hertfordshire, England
- Military career
- Allegiance: United Kingdom
- Branch: Royal Navy
- Rank: Rear-Admiral
- Conflicts: 1868 Expedition to Abyssinia
- Awards: Knight Commander of the Order of the Bath

Rear-Admiral Sir Thomas Hounsom Butler Fellowes KCB DL (19 October 1827 – 26 March 1923) was an English officer in the Royal Navy during the Victorian era.

== Early life ==
Fellowes was born at Adbury House, Burghclere, Hampshire, the son of British Army physician Sir James Fellowes, and Elizabeth James, eldest daughter of Joseph James of Adbury House. His uncle was Vice-Admiral Thomas Fellowes (1778–1853).

== Career ==
Fellowes entered the Royal Navy in 1845 and was promoted to lieutenant on 10 December 1852 and served in the flagship of Vice-Admiral William Fanshawe Martin, HMS Marlborough, in the Mediterranean Fleet. He was promoted commander on 24 June 1862 and on 3 May 1867 took command of HMS Dryad on the East Indies Station. As captain of Dryad he commanded a Naval Brigade of 80 men during the 1868 Expedition to Abyssinia, seeing action at Arogye Pass and the Battle of Magdala. He was invalided out of the ship shortly afterwards. He was promoted to captain on 14 August 1868 for his services in the Abyssinian War and retired on 1 October 1873. He was promoted on the retired list to rear admiral on 1 January 1886.

== Later life ==
Fellowes was knighted during the 1911 Coronation Honours of George V. On 12 June 1912, Fellowes was appointed Deputy Lord Lieutenant of the County of Hertford.

== Personal life ==
Sir Thomas was twice married. First, in 1857, he married Constance Fanny Hanson, the daughter of Charles Simpson Hanson. They had no surviving children and she died 29 December 1888. In August 1890, he married secondly to Margaret Jowitt, daughter of the Rev. William Jowitt, rector of Stevenage, and sister of William Jowitt, 1st Earl Jowitt. He and Margaret, 42 years his junior, had four sons, two of whom predeceased him:

- Captain Thomas Balfour Fellowes (13 July 1891 – 1974)
- Rupert Caldwell Fellowes (12 May 1892 – † 21 August 1918) killed in action in the First World War
- Major Cuthbert Dorset Fellowes MC AFC (26 March 1893)
- Ivon Gordon Fellowes (16 January 1898 – † 18 March 1915), died at sea aged 17 in HMS Irresistible when she struck a mine

Upon the death of Admiral Sir Algernon de Horsey in October 1922, Fellowes became the oldest living officer of the Royal Navy of flag rank. He died in 1923 at age of 95 at Woodfield Park, his home in Stevenage.

Lady Fellowes died in 1953.

== Honours ==
- Abyssinian War Medal
- KCB
