= La Guaira =

- City
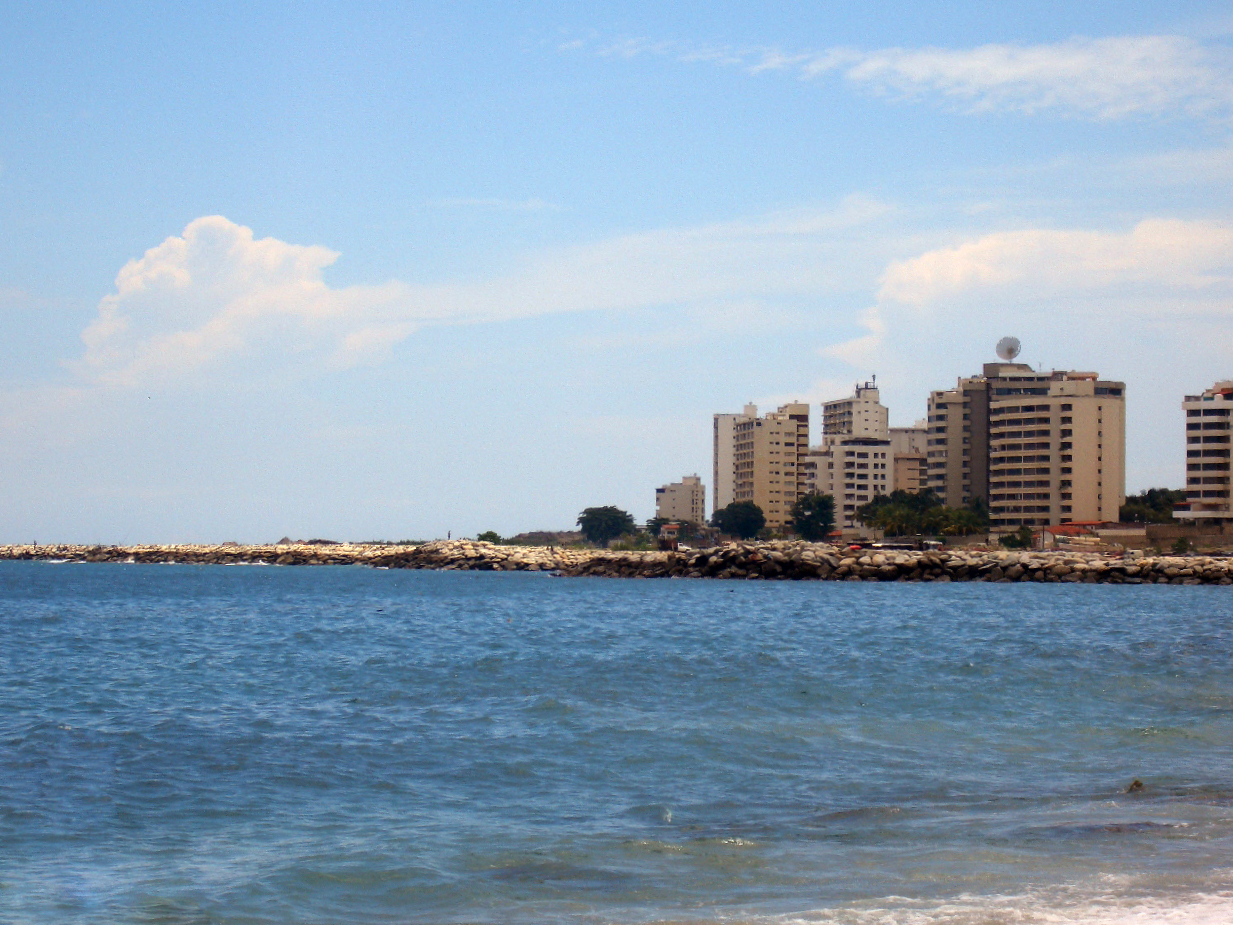
- Los Cocos beach and buildings of the city

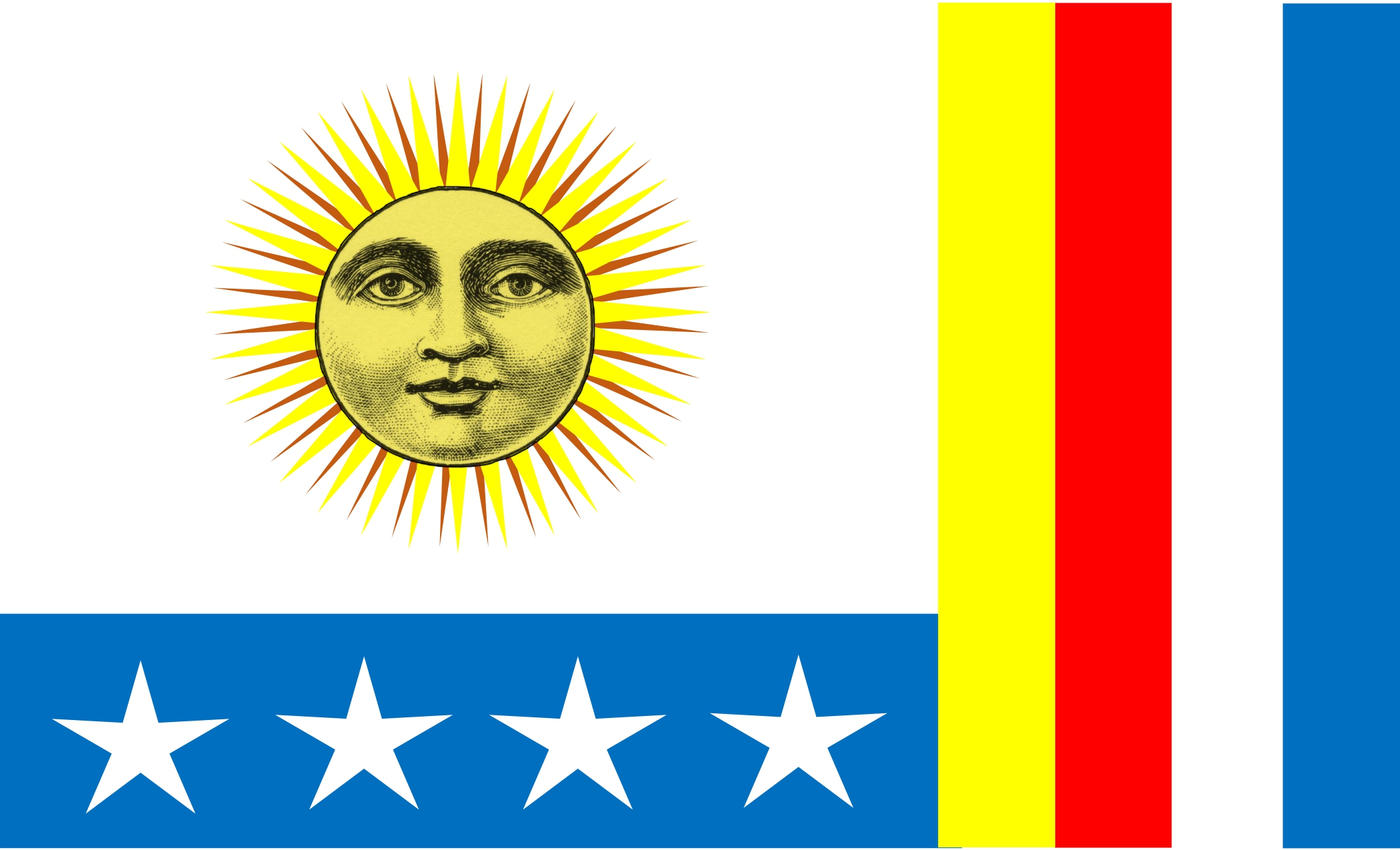
- Flag

- Location in Venezuela La Guaira (the Caribbean)
- Coordinates: 10°36′0″N 66°55′59″W
- Country: Venezuela
- State: La Guaira
- Municipality: Vargas
- Founded: 1577

Government
  - Mayor: José Manuel Suárez Maldonado (PSUV)

Area
  - City: 5.4 sq mi (14 km^{2})

Population (2011)
  - City: 19,162
  - Density: 3,500/sq mi (1,400/km^{2})
  - Metro: 270,792
- Time zone: UTC−4 (VET)
- Postal Code: 1160
- Area code: +58 212
- Demonym: Guairno
- Climate: BSh

La Guaira (Spanish: [la ˈɣwajɾa]) is the capital city of the eponymous state of Venezuela (formerly named Vargas) and the country's main port, founded in 1577 as an outlet for nearby Caracas.

The city hosts its own professional baseball team in the Venezuelan Professional Baseball League, the Tiburones de La Guaira. They have won eight national championships since their founding in 1962 and won the Caribbean Series in 2023–24.

== History ==
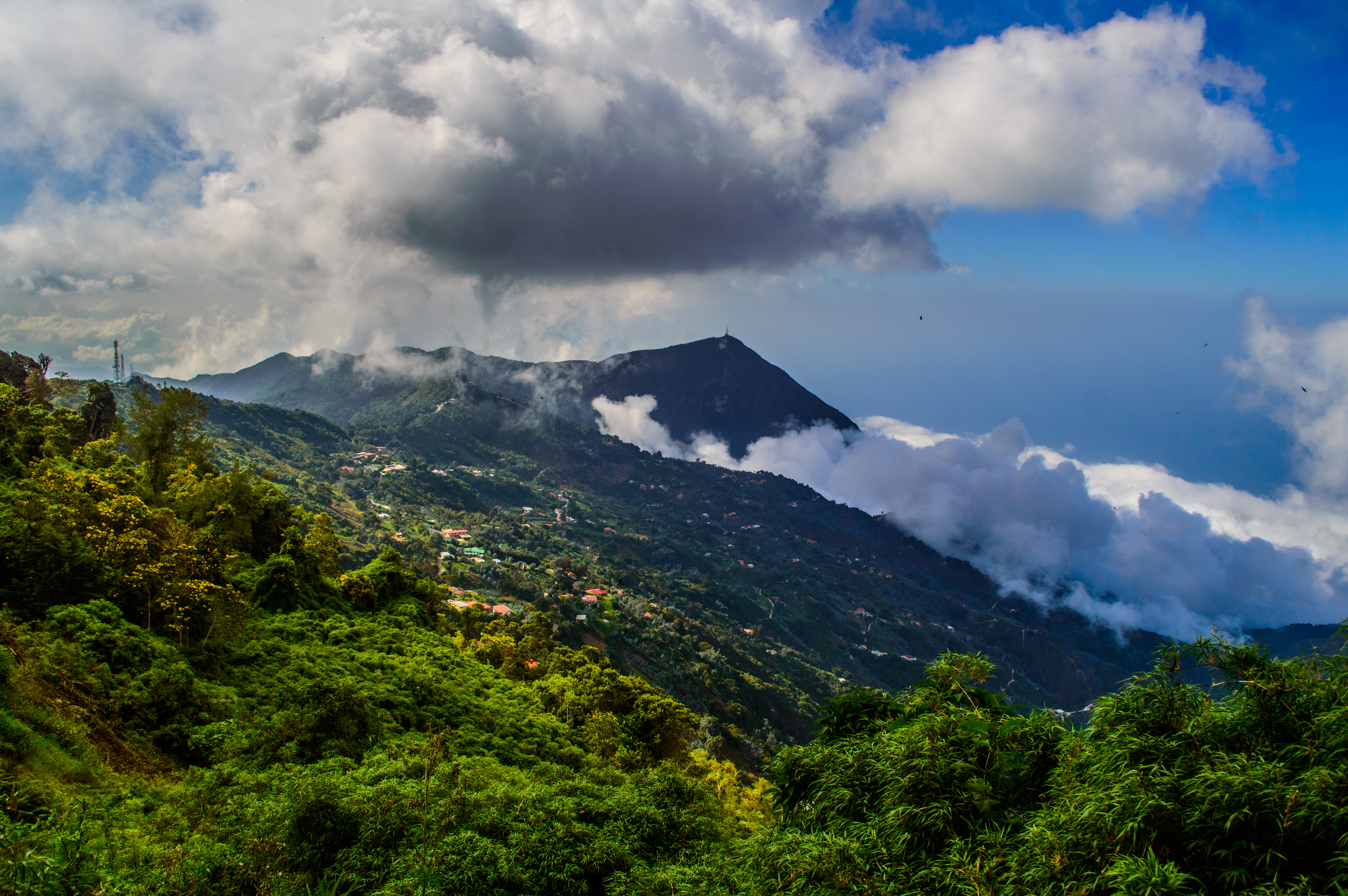
Picacho de Galipán

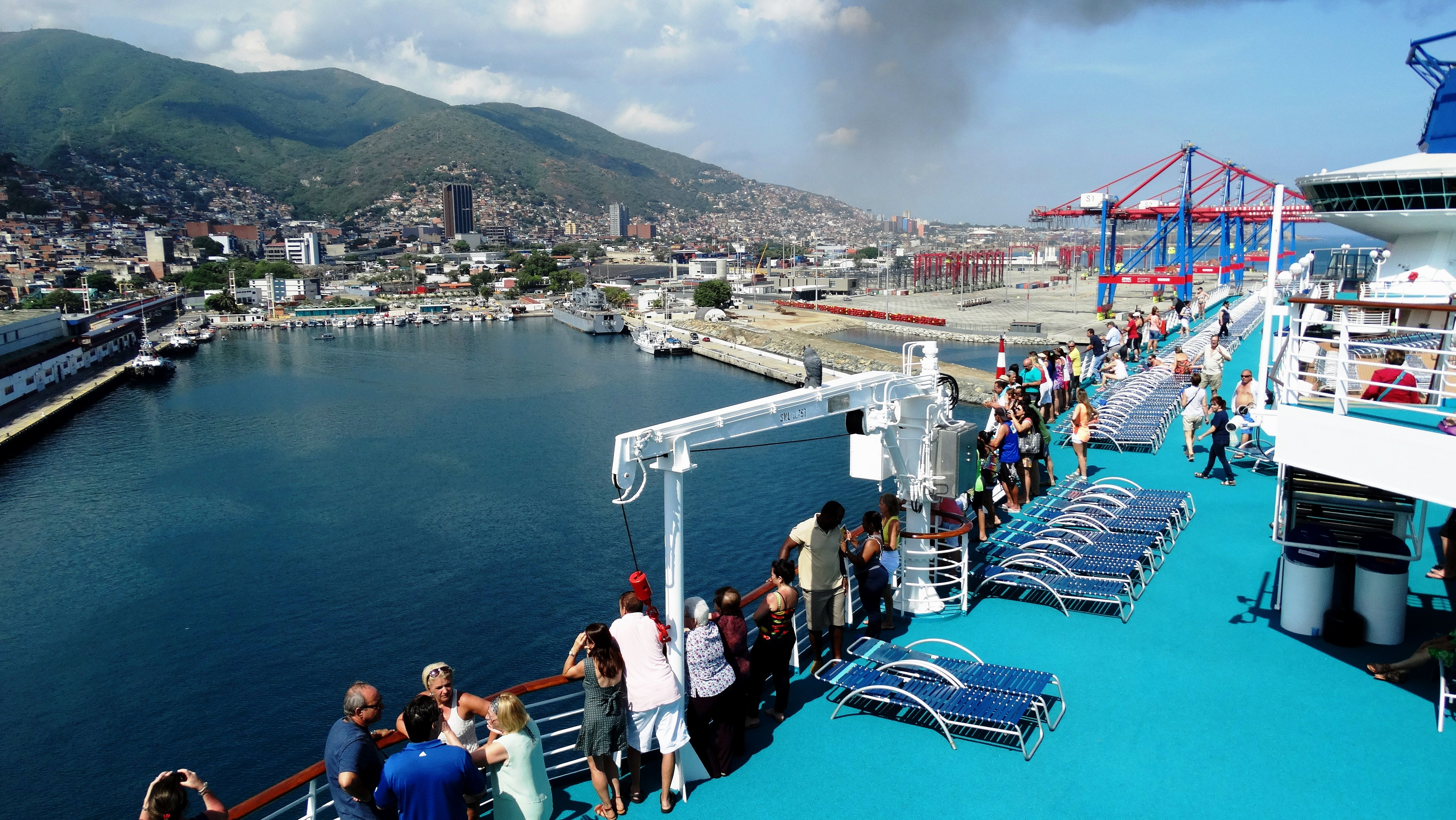
Port of La Guaira

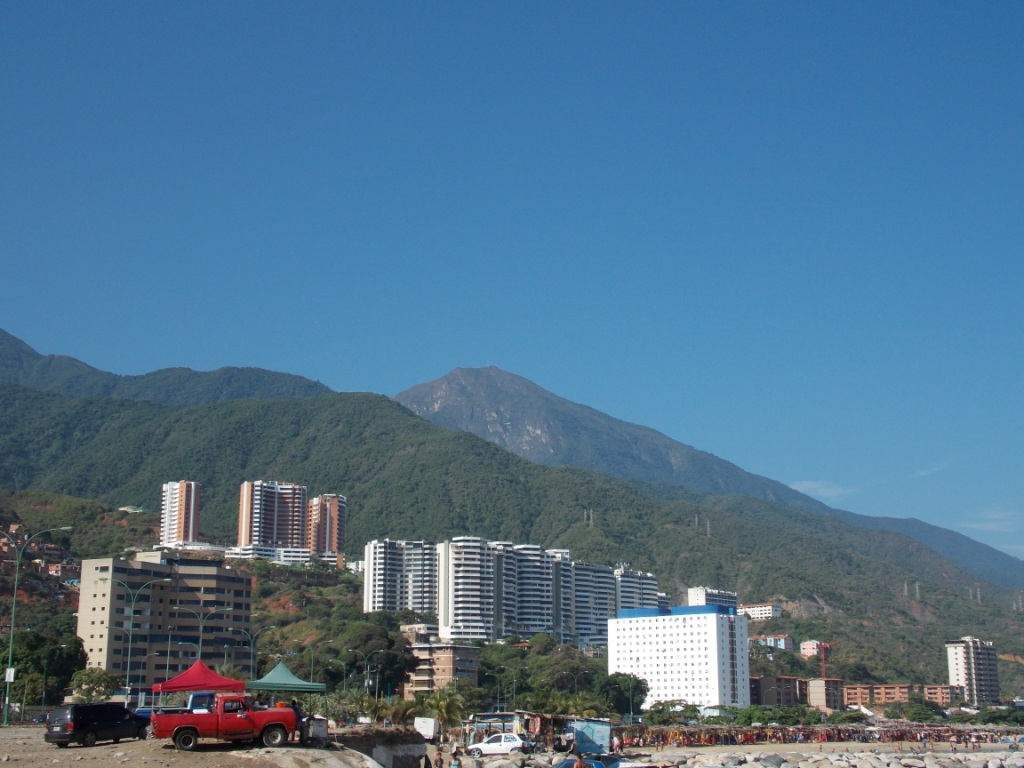
La Guaira

After the founding of Caracas by Spanish in 1567, toward the turn of the 16th century, the Port of La Guaira emerged on the coast and, since that time, has been the gateway to Caracas. This coastal city, almost without land to develop and bathed by the Caribbean Sea, became an important harbour during the 18th century. Attacked by buccaneers and by the English, Dutch, and French armadas, La Guaira was transformed into a fortified, walled city. During the War of Jenkins' Ear (1739–1748), the first attack of the Royal Navy took place on La Guaira. In March 1743, in the Battle of La Guaira, the port was attacked without success by another English squadron of 19 ships under the command of Admiral Charles Knowles. The coastal batteries, led by Gabriel de Zuloaga, José de Iturriaga and Don Mateo Gual, counterattacked and managed to put the English to flight.

This period also saw the trading monopoly of the Royal Gipuzkoan Company of Caracas, which controlled the major ports of La Guaira and Puerto Cabello and was instrumental in the development of large-scale cocoa production along the valleys of the coast. The English frigate HMS Hermione (1782) was delivered to the Spanish authorities at La Guaira after her crew mutinied in 1797.

The town was badly damaged by the great earthquake of 26 March 1812. The same year another small naval battle was fought off La Guaira, between privateers of the United States and the United Kingdom. Now La Guaira is the second port by importance in Venezuela after Puerto Cabello.

In December of 1822, the town was struck by an unusual and rare hurricane. At least 28 ships, and approximately 100 lives were lost.

In 1998, when La Guaira state (then named Vargas) was created from parts of the former Federal District of Caracas, it became the state capital city. The town and the port were badly damaged during the December 1999 floods and mudslides that affected much of the region.

=== 2026 Venezuela earthquakes ===
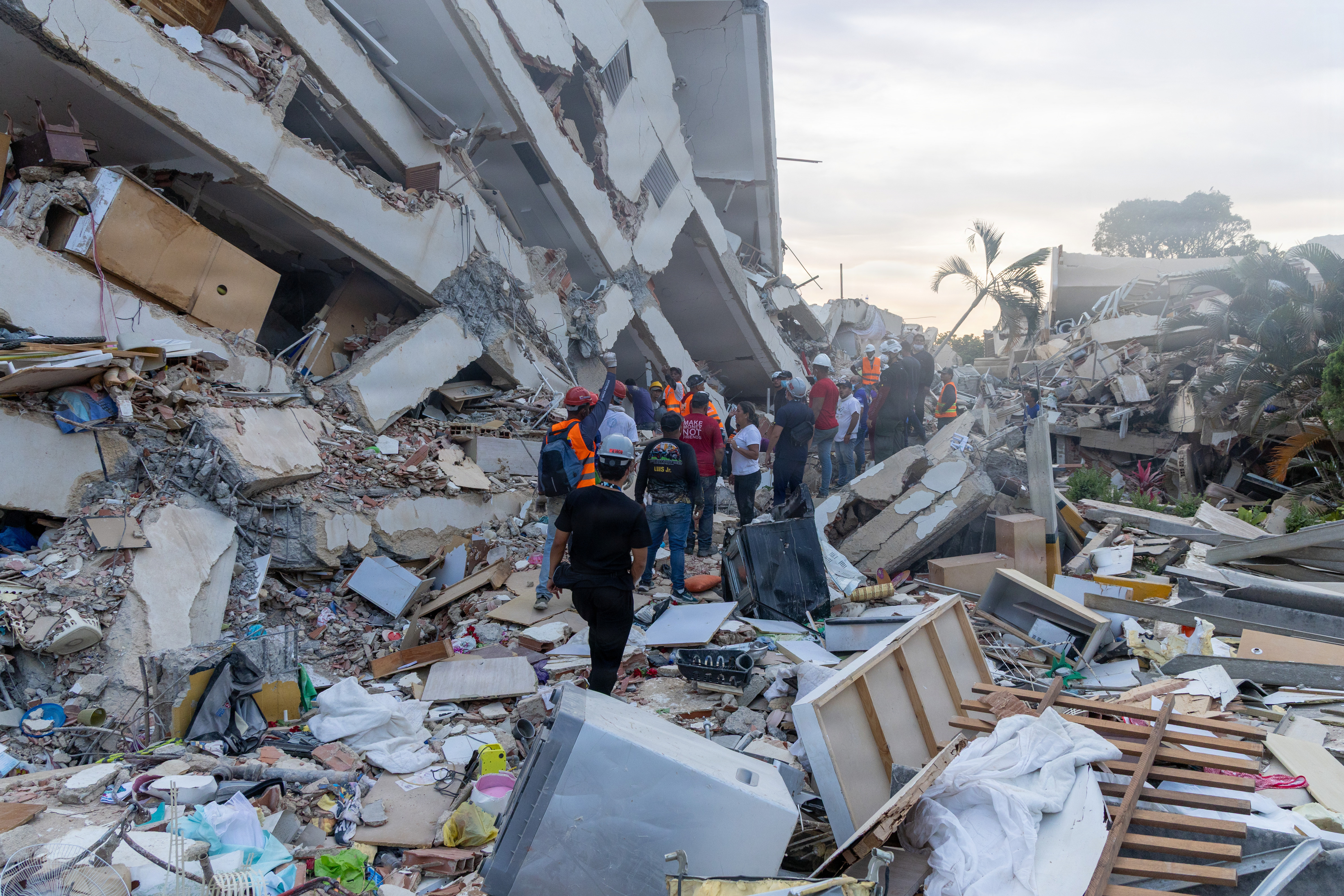
La Guaira on June 28, 2026

On June 24, 2026, La Guaira was badly affected by the 2026 Venezuela earthquakes, causing extensive damage to the infrastructure while causing more than 5,119 deaths.

== Geography ==
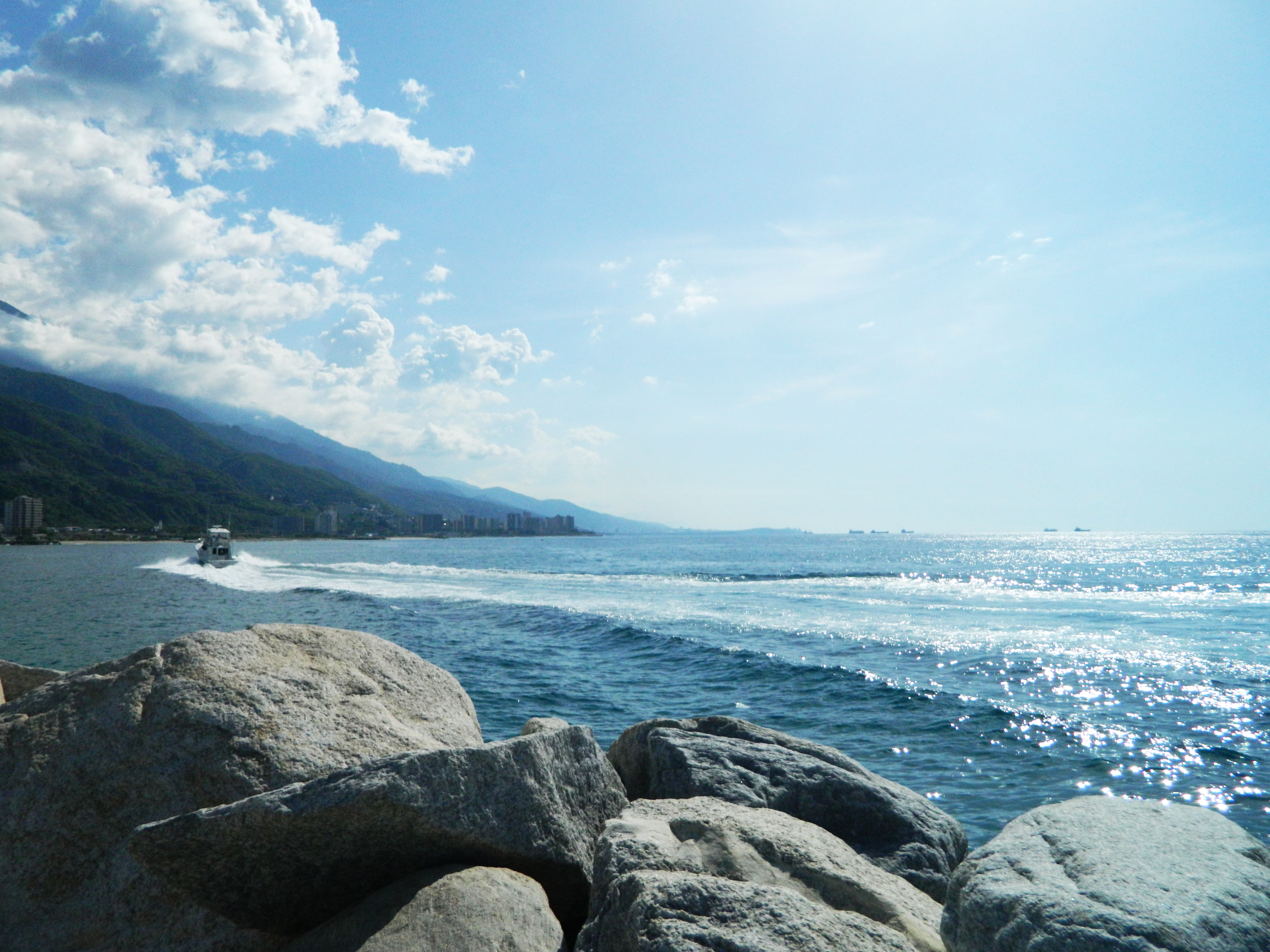
Beach in la Guaira

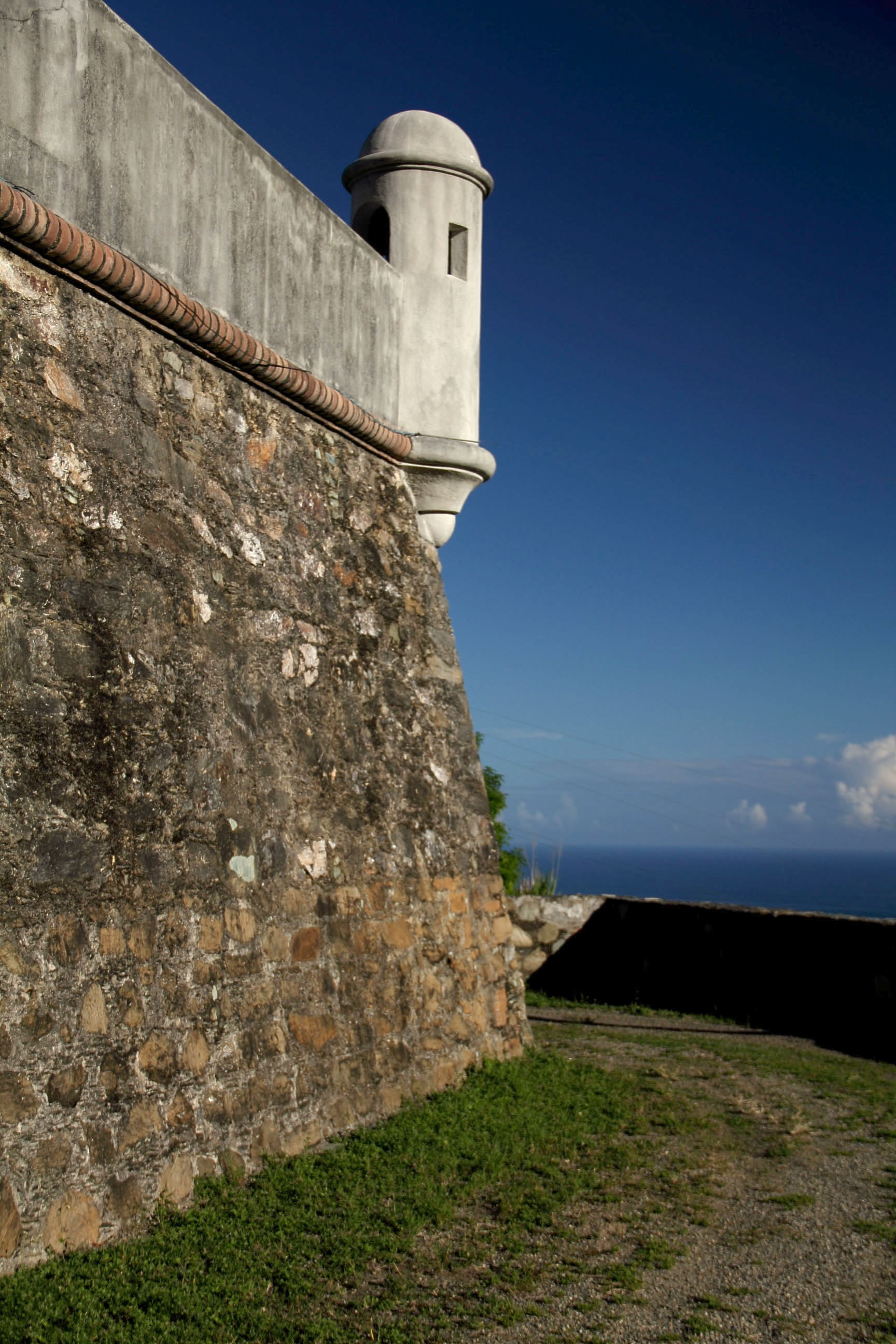
San Carlos Fortress

La Guaira Bank (Spanish: El Placer de La Guaira) is an underwater ridge that is approximately 12 miles off the coast from the city of La Guaira. The bank is approximately 12 miles (19 km) long from east to west and 4 miles (6 km) wide from north to south, and its depth increases from 50 fathoms (90 m) in the surrounding area to 140 fathoms (260 m). The area provides the structure to deep-sea animals, and other organisms such as gorgonians, sponges, and coral, that require ocean currents to bring their food to them. Westerly currents flow off the coast of Venezuela, and the bank acts as a barrier to the current, creating an upwelling of nutrients to the ocean surface from deep-water stockpiles. These nutrients fuel an explosion of planktonic plant and animal growth, and attract larger animals such as whales, porpoises, seabirds, and large pelagics such as tuna, sharks, wahoo, dolphin fish, and four different types of marlin. It is considered one of the top sport fishing destinations in the world due to the unusually high numbers of Atlantic blue marlin, white marlin, sailfish, and spearfish that congregate at different seasons, and are available year-round.
