= Thomas Fellowes (Royal Navy officer, born 1778) =

Royal Navy officer

Rear-Admiral Sir Thomas Fellowes CB
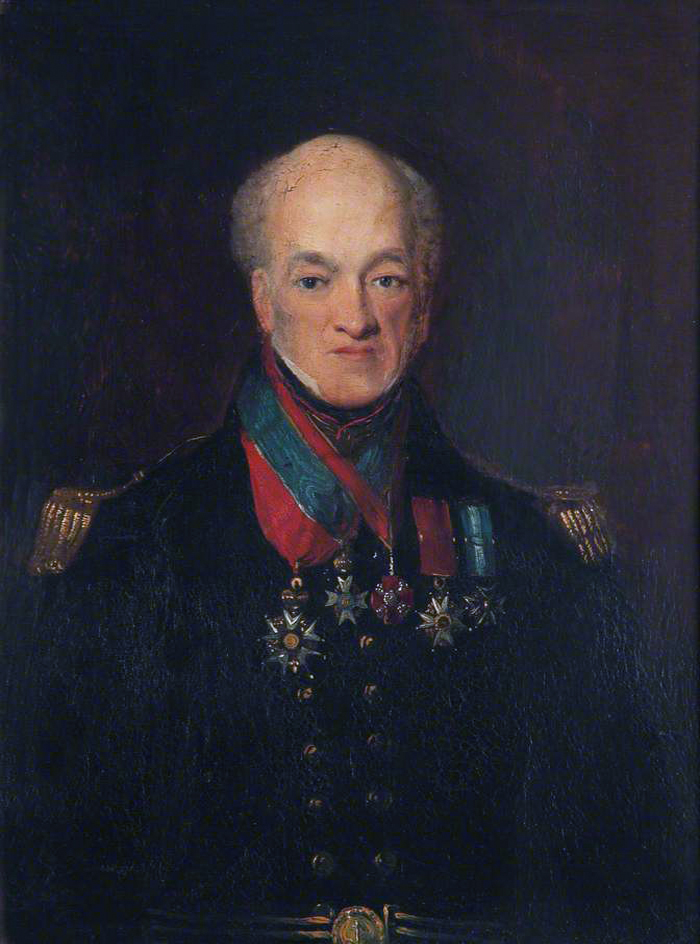
- Portrait by Henry Wyatt, 1836
- Born: 7 January 1778; Minorca
- Died: 12 April 1853 (aged 75); Great Bedwyn, Wiltshire
- Relatives: Sir James Fellowes (brother); Charles Fellowes (son)
- Military career
- Allegiance: Great Britain; United Kingdom
- Branch: Royal Navy
- Service years: 1797–1853
- Rank: Rear-Admiral
- Commands: HMS Swinger; HMS Unique; Cádiz gunboats HMS Fawn; HMS Dartmouth; HMS Pembroke; HMS Vanguard
- Conflicts: French Revolutionary War; Napoleonic Wars; Greek War of Independence; Battle of Navarino
- Awards: Knight bachelor Companion of the Order of the Bath; Knight of the Order of Charles III (Spain); Legion of Honour (France); Order of Saint Anna, 2nd Class (Russia); Order of the Redeemer (Greece)

Rear-Admiral Sir Thomas Fellowes CB (7 January 1778 – 12 April 1853) was a Royal Navy officer who served in the French Revolutionary and Napoleonic Wars.

== Life ==
Fellowes was the youngest of the five sons of William Fellowes, physician-extraordinary to the Prince Regent – one of Thomas's brothers was the physician Sir James Fellowes and James's son was the later Rear Admiral Sir Thomas Hounsom Butler Fellowes. Serving for a while on ships of the East India Company, Thomas moved to the Royal Navy in 1797 as the master's mate on HMS Royal George. He then moved to HMS Diana and then to other ships before the Peace of Amiens in 1802. When the war broke out again he was deployed to the East Indies under Sir Edward Pellew, rising to lieutenant in 1807 and spending time in the West Indies in HMS Northumberland, Sir Alexander Cochrane's flagship. His first command was the brig HMS Swinger in 1808 as lieutenant-commander, with which he fought at the capture of the island of Deseada. This was followed on 13 November 1808 by command of the brig Unique, from which (on 21 May 1809) he made a landing at Basseterre on Guadeloupe, spiking an enemy battery's guns despite being opposed by a large French regular force – he was the only unwounded man to return from the raid.

After Unique was used as a fireship, Fellowes was promoted to commander on 16 September 1809 and put in charge of the gunboats at Cádiz from August 1810 to June 1811, during which time he was promoted to post-captain in March 1811. His next command came on 11 February 1812, with the 20-gun HMS Fawn in the West Indies, with which he fought against privateers until November 1814 and the end of the Napoleonic Wars. He was made a Commander of the Order of the Bath in 1815 and a knight of the Spanish Order of Charles III on 22 February 1822, the latter for his command at Cádiz. His next command, however, only came fifteen years after the peace, with the 42 gun HMS Dartmouth, which he commanded from 21 February 1827 to 16 March 1830 in the Mediterranean – there his attempt to remove a Turkish fireship caused the battle of Navarino on 20 October 1827. His actions in that command gained him the cross of the Légion d'honneur, the Order of St Anne 2nd class, the cross of the Order of the Redeemer, a British knighthood, a presentation sword from William, Duke of Clarence, Lord High Admiral, and a DCL from the University of Oxford.

His final seaborne commands were HMS Pembroke on the Lisbon station (1836–1837) and HMS Vanguard in the Mediterranean (1837–1840). He then returned to the United Kingdom to superintend Plymouth's victualling yard and hospital (1843–1846). He was promoted to rear admiral on 26 July 1847 and died in 1853.

Along with Sir William Abdy, 7th Baronet, Fellowes co-owned three sugar plantations in Antigua and St Vincent. In the 1830s, when the British government emancipated the slaves, Fellowes was compensated to the tune of about £13,000 for the liberation of over 300 slaves.

== Marriage and issue ==
- on 9 November 1813, Katherine Mary (? – October 1817), eldest daughter of Sir William Abdy, 6th Baronet
- on 24 August 1819, to Mary Anne Catharine, only child of Colonel Isaac Humphreys, Bengal Artillery, military secretary to the Bengal government; their children included:
  - Vice-Admiral Charles Fellowes (1823–1886), who died while commanding the channel squadron.

Fellowes is an ancestor of the screenwriter Julian Fellowes.

== See also ==
- O'Byrne, William Richard (1849). "Fellowes, Thomas" . A Naval Biographical Dictionary . John Murray – via Wikisource.
