= HMS Swinger (1872) =

Gunboat of the Royal Navy

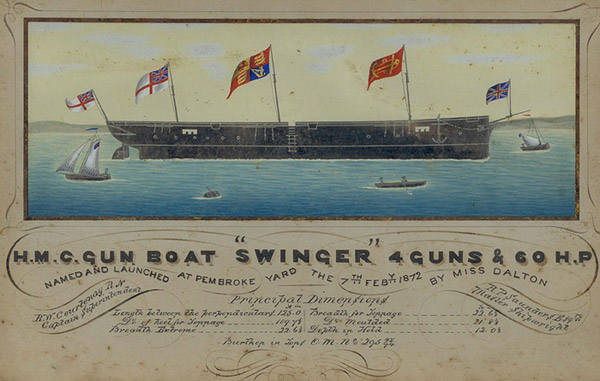
- The launch of HMS Swinger

History

United Kingdom
- Name: HMS Swinger
- Ordered: 1871
- Builder: Pembroke Dockyard
- Cost: Hull £10,600, machinery £3,900
- Launched: 7 February 1872
- Fate: Hulked in 1895. Sold in June 1924

General characteristics
- Class & type: Ariel-class gunboat
- Displacement: 430 tons
- Tons burthen: 295 bm
- Length: 125 ft 0 in (38.10 m)
- Beam: 22 ft 6 in (6.86 m)
- Draught: 10 ft 3 in (3.12 m) max
- Installed power: 461 ihp (344 kW); 60 nominal horsepower
- Propulsion: 2-cylinder horizontal single-expansion steam engine; Two boilers; Single (hoisting) screw
- Sail plan: Three-masted barquentine rig
- Speed: 9.5 knots (17.6 km/h; 10.9 mph)
- Armament: 2 × 6-inch (150 mm) 64-pounder (56 cwt) muzzle-loading rifles; 2 × 4-inch (100 mm) 20-pounder Armstrong breech loaders

HMS Swinger was an Ariel-class composite gunboat of the Royal Navy, built at Pembroke Dockyard and launched on 7 February 1872. She served at first on the China Station and from 1883 on the Australia Station. She was hulked in 1895 sold for breaking in 1924.

== Design and construction ==
Designed by Sir Edward Reed, Chief Constructor of the Royal Navy, the Ariel-class gunboats were the first gunboats of composite construction. Swinger was engined by Humphrys, Tennant & Co. with a horizontal single-expansion steam engine (the rest of the class had compound-expansion engines) developing an indicated horsepower of 461 ihp (344 kW). She was armed with two 6-inch (150 mm) 64-pounder (56 cwt) muzzle-loading rifles and two 4-inch (100 mm) 20-pounder Armstrong breech loaders. All four guns were mounted on traversing carriages. Some of the class were re-armed in the 1880s with two 5-inch and two 4-inch breech loaders. All the ships of the class carried a three-masted barquentine rig.

== Operational service ==
Swinger served at first on the China Station and since it was Royal Navy policy to ship entire crews out to the far-flung stations, she recommissioned at Hong Kong on 18 February 1877.

She commissioned at Devonport on 2 October 1883 for service on the Australia Station. She arrived in Australia in 1884 under the command of Lieutenant Marx and was employed in preventing the blackbirding trade. Soon he fell in with the Forest King to the east of New Guinea, and sent Mr. Millman, the civil magistrate, on board to investigate. On finding 60 illegally taken islanders in the Forest King, he told the master that he would be taken into port the following day, and that he would be sunk if he tried to escape. That night Swinger's quartermaster reported to Marx that the Forest King was throwing coconuts overboard. Rushing to the deck, Marx could see through binoculars that the blackbirders were throwing their human cargo over the side in order to be rid of the incriminating evidence. Still half naked from their hammocks, Swinger's seamen manned the boats and rescued 18 men from the water; about 20 men had drowned. In the morning Marx boarded the Forest King and carried her into Brisbane, where the master was tried by the Vice Admiralty Court of Inquiry. Marx was warned not to walk the streets in uniform since considerable vested interests were affected. Nevertheless, after three days the court convicted the master of Forest King and vindicated Lieutenant Marx.

In 1886 at St. Agnau Swinger had been trading with some natives, and considering them friendly, Marx decided to go ashore. He was attacked and described the assault:

On shore I met one of the natives who had been on board during the morning, to whom I made a present, the other natives were very shy but I distributed some tobacco amongst them through the medium of the same man. After about 10 minutes when I was within 10 yards of the boat and there being three of our party on shore close to me I handed him some more tobacco for things he had brought down. As he took it with one hand, he struck me over the head and right hand with a large trade knife he had in the other and jumped into the bush. Dr.Mc Kinlay who was close to me fired at once at him but without result. A large number of men with arms were seen hiding behind a rock at the same time I think his premature action spoiled a plan for an attack on a larger scale

— Lieutenant John Locke Marx, 1886

Swinger recommissioned in Sydney on 4 May 1887. She left the Australia Station in August 1891.

== Fate ==
She was hulked in 1895 and the outbreak of World War I saw her attached to HMS Impregnable as a store ship. She was sold to Rogers & Company, Plymouth for breaking in June 1924.
