= HMS Decoy (1871) =

Gunboat of the Royal Navy

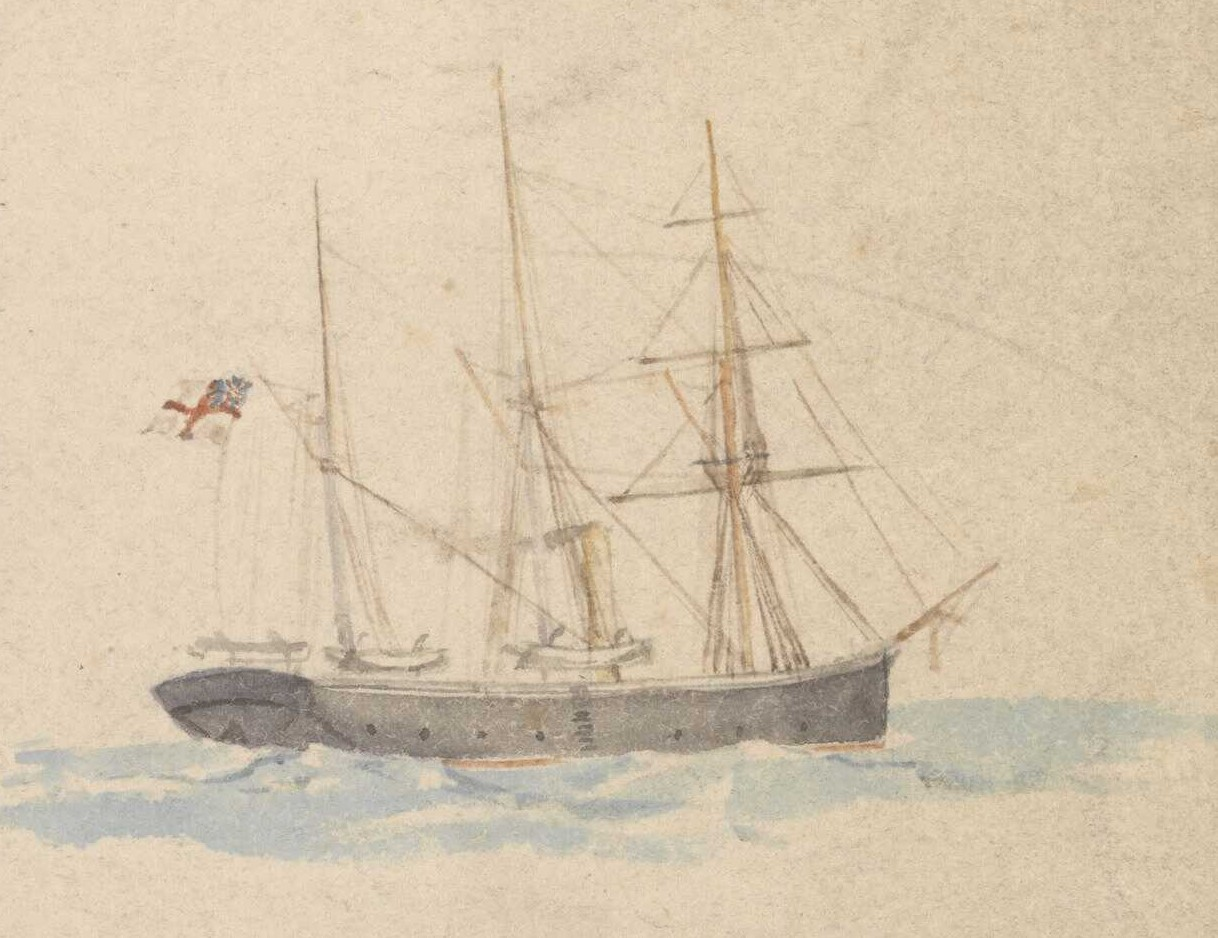
- H.M's Gunboat Decoy at sea

History

United Kingdom
- Name: HMS Decoy
- Ordered: 1871
- Builder: Pembroke Dockyard
- Launched: 12 October 1871
- Fate: Sold in 1885

General characteristics
- Class & type: Ariel-class gunboat
- Displacement: 430 tons
- Tons burthen: 295 bm
- Length: 125 ft 0 in (38.10 m)
- Beam: 22 ft 6 in (6.86 m)
- Draught: 10 ft 3 in (3.12 m) max
- Installed power: 461 ihp (344 kW); 60 nominal horsepower
- Propulsion: 2-cylinder horizontal single-expansion steam engine; Two boilers; Single (hoisting) screw
- Sail plan: Three-masted barquentine rig
- Speed: 9.5 kn (17.6 km/h; 10.9 mph)
- Armament: 2 × 6-inch (150 mm) 64-pounder (56 cwt) muzzle-loading rifles; 2 × 4-inch (100 mm) 20-pounder Armstrong breech loaders

HMS Decoy was an Ariel-class composite gunboat of the Royal Navy, built at Pembroke Dockyard and launched on 12 October 1871. She served in both the Third Anglo-Ashanti War in 1873 and the Bombardment of Alexandria in 1882. She rapidly became obsolete and was sold in 1885.

== Design and construction ==
Designed by Sir Edward Reed, Chief Constructor of the Royal Navy, the Ariel-class gunboats were the first gunboats of composite construction. She was armed with two 6-inch (150 mm) 64-pounder (56 cwt) muzzle-loading rifles and two 4-inch (100 mm) 20-pounder Armstrong breech loaders. All four guns were mounted on traversing carriages. All the ships of the class carried a three-masted barquentine rig.

== Operational service ==
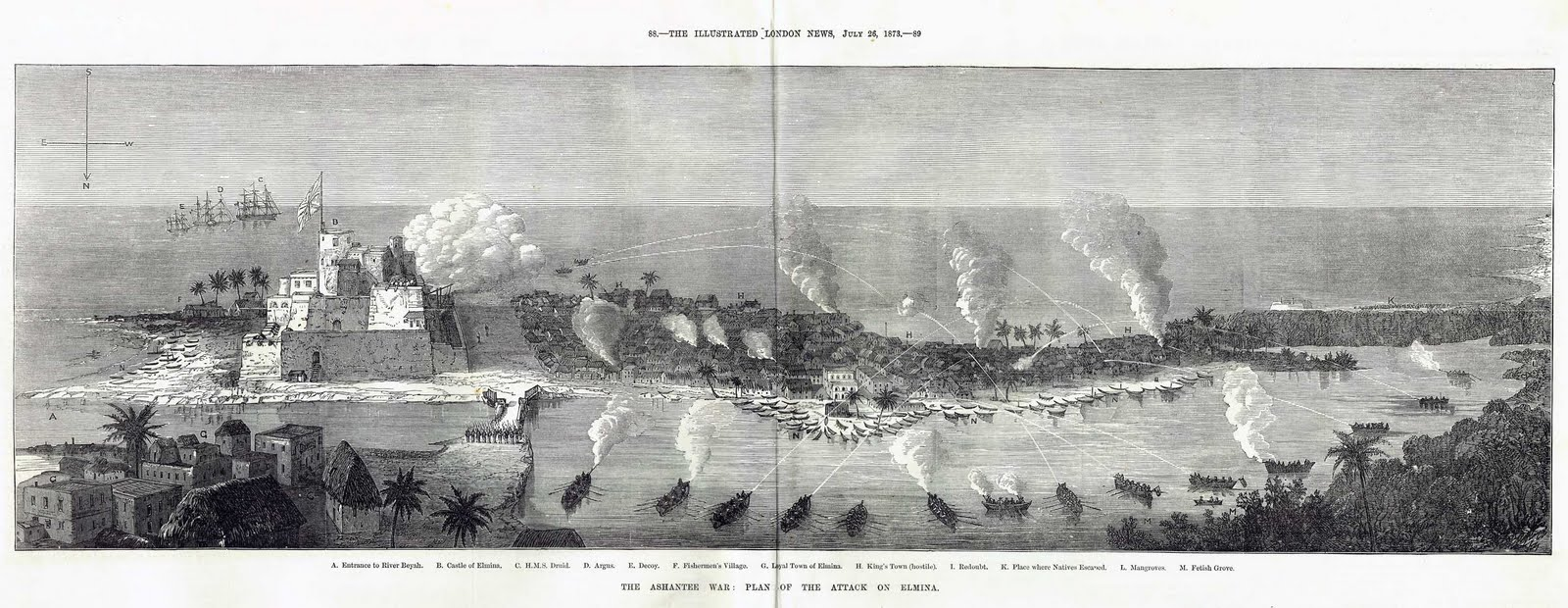
Decoy at the bombardment of Elmina on 13 June 1873

Decoy was deployed off the coast of West Africa to support the operations on the Gold Coast. She deployed with Druid and Argus. She also took part in the bombardment of Bootry.

In 1882 she formed part of the Naval and Military forces at the Bombardment of Alexandria. Argus, Isis, and Beacon blockaded Damietta.

== Fate ==
She was sold at Malta in 1885.

== Publications ==
- Colledge, J. J.; Warlow, Ben (2006) [1969]. Ships of the Royal Navy: The Complete Record of All Fighting Ships of the Royal Navy from the 15th Century to the Present (3rd Rev ed.). London: Chatham Publishing. ISBN 978-1-86176-281-8. OCLC 67375475.
- "HMS Decoy at the Naval Database website". Archived from the original on 10 August 2017.
- Preston, Antony; Major, John (2007). Send a Gunboat: The Victorian Navy and Supremacy at Sea, 1854–1904 (2nd ed.). London: Conway. ISBN 978-0-85177-923-2.
