= Ariel-class gunboat =

1871 class of British gunboats

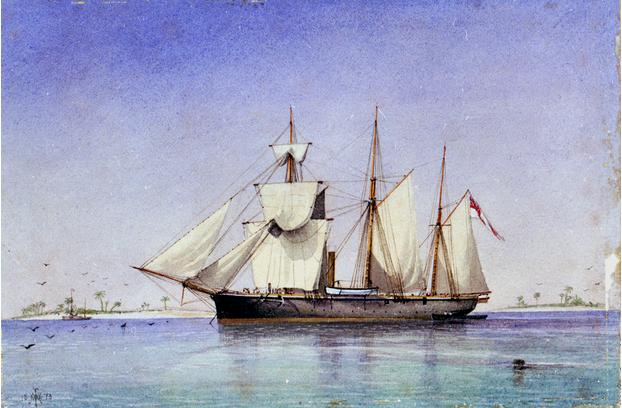
- HMS Coquette, by William Frederick Mitchell (1873)

Class overview
- Name: Ariel-class gunboats
- Builders: Pembroke Dockyard; Chatham Dockyard
- Operators: Royal Navy; British Merchant Navy
- Preceded by: Britomart class
- Succeeded by: Forester class
- Cost: Hull £10,600, machinery £3,900 (Swinger)
- Built: 1871–1873
- In commission: 1871–1895
- Completed: 9
- Lost: 0

General characteristics
- Class & type: Composite gunboat
- Displacement: 430 tons; (except Ariel & Zephyr – 438 tons)
- Tons burthen: 295 bm
- Length: 125 ft 0 in (38.1 m)
- Beam: 22 ft 6 in (6.9 m); (except Ariel & Zephyr – 23 ft)
- Draught: 10 ft 3 in (3.1 m) max
- Installed power: 60 nhp
- Propulsion: 1 × 2-cylinder horizontal compound-expansion steam engine (except Swinger – single-expansion); 2 × boilers; 1 × (hoisting) screw
- Sail plan: Three-masted barquentine rig
- Speed: 9.5 kn (17.6 km/h)
- Complement: 40 (later 60)
- Armament: 2 × 6-inch (150 mm) 64-pounder (56cwt) muzzle-loading rifles; 2 × 4-inch (100 mm) 20-pounder Armstrong breech loaders

The Ariel-class gunboat was a class of nine 4-gun composite gunboats built for the Royal Navy between 1871 and 1873. Although most were sold by 1890, one of them survived into the 1920s as a salvage vessel in private ownership. They were the first class of Royal Navy gunboat built of composite construction, that is, with iron keel, stem and stern posts, and iron framing, but planked with wood.

== Design and construction ==
Designed by Sir Edward Reed, Chief Constructor of the Royal Navy, the Ariel-class gunboats were the first Royal Navy gunboats of composite construction. They were some of the first vessels to be fitted with compound-expansion engines, allowing the Royal Navy to experiment with new engine designs at little risk in small, cheap vessels. (Note: Swinger, uniquely in the class, was engined by Humphrys, Tennant & Co. with a horizontal single-expansion steam engine.) These engines were rated 60 nominal horsepower (an indicated horsepower of between 461 ihp (344 kW) and 534 ihp (398 kW)). They were armed with two 6-inch (150 mm) 64-pounder (56cwt) muzzle-loading rifles and two 4-inch (100 mm) 20-pounder Armstrong breech loaders. All 4 guns were mounted on traversing carriages. Some of the class were re-armed in the 1880s with two 5-inch and two 4-inch breech loaders. All the ships of the class carried a three-masted barquentine rig.

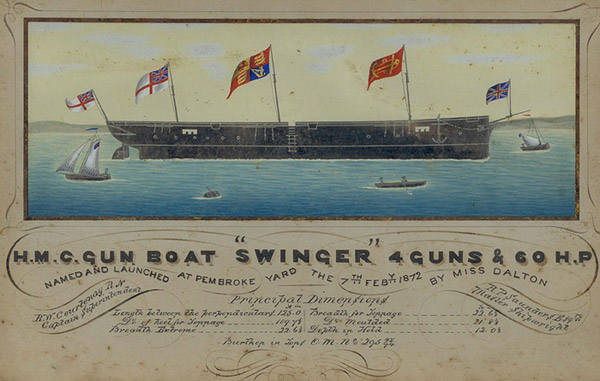
The launch of HMS Swinger

== Ships ==
Name	Ship Builder	Launched	Fate
Coquette	Pembroke Dockyard	5 April 1871	Sold in August 1889
Foam	Pembroke Dockyard	29 August 1871	Sold in June 1887
Decoy	Pembroke Dockyard	12 October 1871	Sold in October 1885
Merlin	Pembroke Dockyard	24 November 1871	Sold on 27 February 1891
Mosquito	Pembroke Dockyard	9 December 1871	Sold in December 1888
Goshawk	Pembroke Dockyard	23 January 1872	Hulk in 1902. Sold c1906
Swinger	Pembroke Dockyard	7 February 1872	Hulk 1895. Sold to Rogers & Company in June 1924
Ariel	Chatham Dockyard	11 February 1873	Coastguard 26 November 1877. Sold in August 1889
Zephyr	Chatham Dockyard	11 February 1873	Sold to George Cohen as a salvage vessel in February 1889. Broken up at Briton Ferry in June 1929

== Publications ==
- Colledge, J. J.; Warlow, Ben (2006) [1969]. Ships of the Royal Navy: The Complete Record of All Fighting Ships of the Royal Navy from the 15th Century to the Present (3rd Rev ed.). London: Chatham Publishing. ISBN 978-1-86176-281-8. OCLC 67375475.
- Lyon, David & Winfield, Rif (2004). The Sail and Steam Navy List: All the Ships of the Royal Navy 1815–1889. Chatham Publishing. ISBN 978-1-86176-032-6. OCLC 52620555.
- Preston, Antony; Major, John (2007). Send a Gunboat: The Victorian Navy and Supremacy at Sea, 1854–1904 (2nd ed.). London: Conway. ISBN 978-0-85177-923-2.
