= List of shipwrecks in May 1874 =

The list of shipwrecks in May 1874 includes ships sunk, foundered, grounded, or otherwise lost during May 1874.

== 1 May ==
List of shipwrecks: 1 May 1874
Ship	State	Description
Amelia	United Kingdom	The brig foundered in the North Sea 100 nautical miles (190 km) south west of Heligoland. Her six crew were rescued by an Italian vessel. Amelia was on a voyage from Hartlepool, County Durham to a Baltic port.
Kutty Rahiman	India	The brig foundered in the Bay of Bengal. Her nineteen crew took to a boat. They were rescued on 10 May by Evangeline ( (United Kingdom) Jersey). Kutty Rahiman was on a voyage from Galle, Ceylon to Chittagong.
Lizzie	United Kingdom	The brigantine was driven ashore and wrecked at Port Nolloth, Cape Colony.
Menzaleh	United Kingdom	The steamship ran aground at Barrow-in-Furness, Lancashire. She was on a voyage from Barrow-in-Furness to Quebec City, Canada. She was refloated on 4 May.

== 3 May ==
List of shipwrecks: 3 May 1874
Ship	State	Description
Albert	United Kingdom	The steamship was run into by the steamship Martaban (United Kingdom) and sank in the Clyde at Greenock, Renfrewshire.
Emulous	New Zealand	The 157-ton brigantine went ashore in a heavy swell at Oamaru. The schooner Ocean Wave stranded nearby but lifted clear at the next high tide. Although the Emulous was described as a wreck and sold as such at auction, she was refloated later in 1874, only to again run aground just north of Oamaru on 11 October. On this second occasion she was too badly wrecked to be repaired.

== 4 May ==
List of shipwrecks: 4 May 1874
Ship	State	Description
Blue Jacket	United Kingdom	The smack was driven ashore and wrecked on Schiermonnikoog, Friesland, Netherlands. Her crew survived.

== 6 May ==
List of shipwrecks: 6 May 1874
Ship	State	Description
Puno	United Kingdom	The ship struck rocks off the Isla de Flores, Uruguay. She was on a voyage from Liverpool, Lancashire to Callao, Peru. She was refloated and put in to Montevideo, Uruguay.
Unnamed	Flag unknown	The steamship foundered in the North Sea 32 nautical miles (59 km) north north east of the Noord Hinder Lightship (Netherlands) with the loss of all hands.

== 7 May ==
List of shipwrecks: 7 May 1874
Ship	State	Description
Clifton	United Kingdom	The barque was wrecked at Oeiras, Portugal. She was on a voyage from Malabar to Newcastle upon Tyne, Northumberland.
Concurrent	Netherlands	The ship was sunk by ice at Kronstadt, Russia. Her crew were rescued. She was on a voyage from Newcastle upon Tyne to Saint Petersburg, Russia.

== 8 May ==
List of shipwrecks: 8 May 1874
Ship	State	Description
Ceres	United Kingdom	The fishing cutter was driven ashore on Terschelling, Friesland, Netherlands. Her crew were rescued.
Clifton	United Kingdom	The barque was destroyed by fire at Lagos, Portugal with some loss of life.
Edgar	United Kingdom	The fishing cutter was driven ashore on Terschelling. Her crew were rescued.
Express	United Kingdom	The fishing cutter was driven ashore on Terschelling. Her crew were rescued.
Mizpah	United Kingdom	The fishing cutter was driven ashore on Terschelling. Her crew were rescued.
Times	United Kingdom	The tug collided with the steamship Emily (United Kingdom) and sank in the River Thames at Greenwich, Kent.

== 9 May ==
List of shipwrecks: 9 May 1874
Ship	State	Description
Great Yarmouth	United Kingdom	The steamship ran aground on the Newcombe Sand, in the North Sea off the coast of Suffolk. She was on a voyage from Riga, Russia to Lowestoft, Suffolk. She was refloated.
Jolly Dogs	United Kingdom	The Thames barge capsized in The Downs. She was towed in to Ramsgate, Kent.
Maritana, and Retreiver	United Kingdom	The full-rigged ship collided with the tug Retreiver off the Tuskar Rock and foundered with the loss of a crew member. Maritana was on her maiden voyage, from Glasgow, Renfrewshire to San Francisco, California, United States. Retreiver also sank. Her crew survived. Survivors from both vessels were rescued by the tug Universe (United Kingdom).

== 10 May ==
List of shipwrecks: 10 May 1874
Ship	State	Description
HMS Endymion	Royal Navy	The screw frigate ran aground in Palermo Bay, Sicily, Italy. Refloated and sailed to Cagliari, Sardinia, Italy for assessment.
Eve	Italy	The brig collided with the steamship Alice (United Kingdom) and sank at "Seraglio". Her crew were rescued.
HMS Narcissus	Royal Navy	The screw frigate ran aground in Palermo Bay suffering moderate damage. Refloated and sailed to Cagliari for assessment.
Pearl	United Kingdom	The schooner was sunk by a large marine animal off Galle, Ceylon with the loss of one of her six crew. Survivors were rescued by the steamship Strathowen (United Kingdom. Pearl was on a voyage from Mauritius to Rangoon, Burma.

== 11 May ==
List of shipwrecks: 11 May 1874
Ship	State	Description
Derzhava	Imperial Russian Navy	The royal yacht, a paddle steamer, ran aground at Vlissingen, Zeeland, Netherlands. She was on a voyage from Vlissingen to Gravesend, Kent, United Kingdom. She was refloated on 13 May.
Eliza Nelson	United Kingdom	The brig was wrecked on the Domesnes Reef, in the Baltic Sea. Her crew were rescued. She was on a voyage from Copenhagen, Denmark to Riga, Russia.
Zuova	Italy	The brig was driven ashore and wrecked on Nexø, Denmark. She was on a voyage from Kronstadt, Russia to Dundee, Forfarshire, United Kingdom.

== 12 May ==
List of shipwrecks: 12 May 1874
Ship	State	Description
Anna	Norway	The schooner was driven ashore and wrecked in St Andrews Bay. Her six crew were rescued by the Saint Andrews Lifeboat Ladies' Own ( Royal National Lifeboat Institution). Anna was on a voyage from Dram to St Andrews, Fife, United Kingdom.
Hilda	United Kingdom	The ship was driven ashore at Battery Point, in the Firth of Forth. She was on a voyage from Alloa, Clackmannanshire to Christiania, Norway.
Orlebar	United Kingdom	The ship was abandoned in the Atlantic Ocean. Her crew were rescued. She was on a voyage from Belfast, County Antrim to Richibucto, New Brunswick, Canada.
Severn	United Kingdom	The schooner sprang a leak and sank 2 nautical miles (3.7 km) north of Aberdovey, Merionethshire.
Viking	United Kingdom	The steamship was driven ashore at Father Point, Quebec, Canada. She was on a voyage from Liverpool, Lancashire to Montreal, Quebec.

== 13 May ==
List of shipwrecks: 13 May 1874
Ship	State	Description
Pioneer	United Kingdom	The steamship was driven ashore at Hoek van Holland, South Holland, Netherlands. She was on a voyage from Rotterdam, South Holland to Bristol, Gloucestershire. She was refloated and put back to Rotterdam in a leaky condition.

== 14 May ==
List of shipwrecks: 14 May 1874
Ship	State	Description
Neride	Germany	The barque ran aground on the Shipwash Sand, in the North Sea off the coast of Suffolk, United Kingdom. Her crew were rescued. She was refloated with the assistance of some smacks and a tug and assisted in to Harwich, Essex, United Kingdom.
"Tawas"	United States	The tugboat sank in 225 feet of water in Lake Huron with all 5 hands when her boiler exploded about 25 miles southeast of Harbor Beach, Michigan. Wreck located 2025.

== 15 May ==
List of shipwrecks: 15 May 1874
Ship	State	Description
Firefly	United Kingdom	The brigantine ran aground on the Haisborough Sands, in the North Sea off the coast of Norfolk. Her crew were rescued by Jane Cargill (United Kingdom). Firefly was on a voyage from Rotterdam, South Holland, Netherlands to South Shields, County Durham. She floated off and came ashore at Sea Palling, Norfolk.
Hanover	United Kingdom	The ship departed from Tianjin, China for Newcastle, New South Wales. No further trace, presumed foundered with the loss of all hands.

== 17 May ==
List of shipwrecks: 17 May 1874
Ship	State	Description
Nore	Sweden	The steamship ran aground at Domsten. She was on a voyage from an English port at a Russian port.

== 18 May ==
List of shipwrecks: 18 May 1874
Ship	State	Description
Bonita	Belgium	The steamship ran aground and was wrecked at Vigo, Spain. Her crew were rescued.

== 20 May ==
List of shipwrecks: 20 May 1874
Ship	State	Description
Sarah M. Sanders	United States	The fishing schooner sank off Dennis Port, Massachusetts.
Tegetthoff	Austria-Hungary	Tegethoff fast in the ice in the Barents Sea. Austro-Hungarian North Pole expedition: The steamship was abandoned in the Barents Sea 275 nautical miles (509 km) off Franz Josef Land.

== 21 May ==
List of shipwrecks: 21 May 1874
Ship	State	Description
HMS Niobe	Royal Navy	The wreck of Niobe (centre). Illustration from the Illustrated London News, 18 July 1874. The Amazon-class sloop was wrecked in fog off Miquelon Island with the loss of one life. The gunvessel HMS Woodlark (Royal Navy) saved the rest of her crew.

== 22 May ==
List of shipwrecks: 22 May 1874
Ship	State	Description
Agnes	New Zealand	The 23-ton cutter departed from Manukau Harbour for the Waikato River. She was not sighted again, although wreckage from her washed ashore near Raglan in late June.
Bezerra de Menezes	Imperial Brazilian Navy	The corvette ran aground in the River Thames at Blackwall, Middlesex, United Kingdom. She was on a voyage from London, United Kingdom to Rio de Janeiro. She was refloated and resumed her voyage.
HMS Lively	Royal Navy	The despatch vessel ran aground at Ryde, Isle of Wight. She was refloated with assistance from the tug Camel (United Kingdom).

== 23 May ==
List of shipwrecks: 23 May 1874
Ship	State	Description
British Admiral	United Kingdom	The passenger ship, travelling from Liverpool, Lancashire to Melbourne, Victoria was sunk after hitting rocks off King's Island, Tasmania. Only nine of the 88 passengers and crew were rescued.
Bezerra de Menezes	Imperial Brazilian Navy	The corvette ran aground in the River Thames. She was refloated and resumed her voyage. She was refloated and resumed her voyage

== 24 May ==
List of shipwrecks: 24 May 1874
Ship	State	Description
Ellen Stuart	United Kingdom	The full-rigged ship was driven ashore at the South Foreland, Kent. She was on a voyage from Calcutta, India to London.
Quangtse	United Kingdom	The steamship ran ashore at the South Foreland. She was on a voyage from China to London. She was refloated the next day with the assistance of a tug.

== 25 May ==
List of shipwrecks: 25 May 1874
Ship	State	Description
Coronet	United Kingdom	The steamship ran aground on the Goodwin Sands, Kent. She was on a voyage from Antwerp, Belgium to Cardiff, Glamorgan. She was refloated the next day and resumed her voyage.
Emu	New Zealand	The 27-ton ketch capsized and sank near Pigeon Bay, Banks Peninsula.
Maitland	United Kingdom	The clipper was wrecked on Huon Island with the loss of all hands. She was on a voyage from Moreton Bay to Fuzhou, China.
Princess Clementine	United Kingdom	The steamship was driven ashore at the Abbot's Cliff, between Dover and Folkestone, Kent. She was on a voyage from Boulogne, Pas-de-Calais, France to Folkestone. She was refloated with the assistance of Queen of the Belgians (United Kingdom).

== 26 May ==
List of shipwrecks: 26 May 1874
Ship	State	Description
Agamemnon	United Kingdom	The steamship ran aground at Hangkow, China. She was on a voyage from Hankow to a British port. She was refloated on 30 May.
Arab	United Kingdom	The schooner sank off Sea Palling, Norfolk. Her crew survived.
Gomos	United Kingdom	Cable ship stranded in Rio Grande do Sul on bar while transporting 204 nmi (378 km; 235 mi) of cable. No loss of life, but the ship and cable were lost. Replacement cable lost with some 58 lives on foundering of La Plata (United Kingdom) on 29 November 1874.
Mary Thompson	New Zealand	The 49-ton collier schooner was driven onto a reef and wrecked at Omaha Bay, New Zealand.

== 27 May ==
List of shipwrecks: 27 May 1874
Ship	State	Description
Elite	United Kingdom	The barquentine was wrecked on the Pallister Reef, off Barbuda. Her crew were rescued. She was on a voyage from Montserrat to London.
Rubenow	Germany	The ship was wrecked on the Longsand, in the North Sea off the coast of Essex, United Kingdom. Her crew were rescued. She was on a voyage from London to the White Sea.

== 28 May ==
List of shipwrecks: 28 May 1874
Ship	State	Description
Earl of South Esk		The 336-ton barque, laden with a cargo of coal from Australia, hit Barrett's Reef while trying to enter Wellington Harbour, New Zealand, in a heavy sea. The crew abandoned ship and were saved, and Earl of South Esk slipped off the reef and sank minutes later.
Gogo	United Kingdom	The steamship ran aground at Villareal, Spain. She was on a voyage from Liverpool, Lancashire to Huelva, Spain. She was refloated the next day and resumed her voyage.

== 29 May ==
List of shipwrecks: 29 May 1874
Ship	State	Description
Nabob	United States	The ship was sighted off Cape Horn, Chile whilst on a voyage from Portland, Oregon to Queenstown, County Cork, United Kingdom. No further trace, presumed foundered with the loss of all hands.

== Unknown date ==
List of shipwrecks: Unknown date in May 1874
Ship	State	Description
Anton Gerhard	Germany	The ship was wrecked at Alvarado, Mexico.
Aurelia	United Kingdom	The brig foundered in the North Sea. Her crew were rescued.
Ceres	Denmark	The full-rigged ship foundered in the Atlantic Ocean.
Drogheda	United Kingdom	The ship was abandoned at sea. Her crew were rescued. She was on a voyage from Hartlepool, County Durham to Quebec City, Canada.
Durham	United Kingdom	The ship was wrecked on "Variety Island".
Estrelle	Canada	The ship was wrecked on Inagua, Bahamas. She was on a voyage from New York to Cuba.
Ethiopia	United Kingdom	The steamship lost her propeller in the Atlantic Ocean before 8 May. Her passengers were taken off by the steamship State of Pennsylvania (United States).
Euphegena, or Iphigenia	United Kingdom	The ship was wrecked on Grand Cayman, Cayman Islands. The wreck was plundered by the local inhabitants. She was on a voyage from Cardiff, Glamorgan to Pensacola, Florida, United States.
Georgia	United States	The ship was sunk by ice at Quebec City.
Helen	United Kingdom	The brig foundered in the North Sea with the loss of all hands. She was on a voyage from South Shields, County Durham to Montrose, Forfarshire.
Hydra	Germany	The ship struck a rock off Tamsui, Formosa before 12 May and was wrecked. Her crew were rescued.
Idaho	United Kingdom	The steamship was driven ashore on Fire Island, New York before 26 May. She was refloated.
Iphigenia	United Kingdom	The barque was wrecked at "Cayames".
Leander	Germany	The brigantine was driven ashore at the Grauerort fortress, in the Elbe. She was on a voyage from Hamburg to Africa.
Linda	United Kingdom	The steamship caught fire and was abandoned in the Atlantic Ocean. Her crew were rescued. She was on a voyage from Liverpool, Lancashire to Saint John's, Newfoundland Colony.
Marie Vigilante	Canada	The ship was wrecked at Quebec City before 13 May. She was on a voyage from Cap-Saint-Ignace to Montreal.
Moss Rose	United Kingdom	The ship was driven ashore at Rangoon, Burma before 15 May. She was refloated and taken in to Akyab for repairs.
Napoleon III	United States	The ship was sunk by ice at Quebec City.
Norway	United Kingdom	The steamship ran aground in the Danube.
Pacifico	United Kingdom	The brig was driven ashore at Roquetas de Mar, Spain. Her crew were rescued.
Racoon	United Kingdom	The Pearl-class corvette ran aground at Barbados.
River Plate	United Kingdom	The schooner ran aground and was wrecked at Port Alfred, Cape Colony.
Shandon	United Kingdom	The ship ran aground at Trois-Rivières, Quebec, Canada before 13 May. She was on a voyage from Liverpool to Montreal, Quebec. She was refloated and resumed her voyage.
Sylvia	United States	The ship was wrecked on the Long Bank Reef. She was on a voyage from New York to Cárdenas, Cuba.
Teaser	Canada	The ship was wrecked in the Caicos Islands. Her cew were rescued. She was on a voyage from Inagua to Halifax, Nova Scotia.
Tenasserim	United Kingdom	The steamship ran aground at "Buckeer", Burma. She was on a voyage from Glasgow, Renfrewshire to Rangoon, Burma. She was refloated and completed her voyage.
William Cargill	United Kingdom	The ship was driven ashore and wrecked at Barbados. She was on a voyage from Callao, Peru to Saint Vincent.
Unnamed	Flag unknown	The brig capsized in the North Sea. She was driven ashore on Sylt, Germany.
Unnamed	(Spain) Carlists	Third Carlist War: The barque was scuttled near Portugalete, Spain.
