= John Hopkins (Royal Navy officer) =

Royal Navy Admiral (1834–1916)

Admiral Sir John Hopkins GCB
- Born: 13 July 1834
- Died: 30 July 1916 (aged 82)
- Military career
- Allegiance: United Kingdom
- Branch: Royal Navy
- Service years: 1848–1899
- Rank: Admiral
- Commands: HMS Liverpool; HMS Narcissus; HMS Royal Adelaide; HMS Temeraire; North America and West Indies Station; Mediterranean Fleet
- Awards: Knight Grand Cross of the Order of the Bath

Admiral Sir John Ommanney Hopkins GCB (13 July 1834 – 30 July 1916) was a Royal Navy officer who went on to be commander-in-chief, Mediterranean Fleet.

== Naval career ==
Hopkins joined the Royal Navy in 1848. Promoted to captain in 1867, he commanded successively HMS Liverpool, HMS Narcissus, HMS Royal Adelaide and HMS Temeraire. He became commander of HMS Excellent, the Gunnery School at Portsmouth, in 1880. In 1881 he became private secretary to the First Lord of the Admiralty and in 1883 he was made captain-superintendent of Sheerness Dockyard and director of heavy ordnance in 1883. He went on to be admiral-superintendent of Portsmouth Dockyard in 1886 and junior naval lord and then Third Naval Lord and Controller of the Navy in 1888.

Hopkins had the distinction in 1893 of parading his brigade of Royal Marines in New York City in the first display of British military force in that city since the American Revolutionary War.

Promoted to vice admiral in 1891, Hopkins was appointed commander-in-chief, North American and West Indies Station later that year before being made Commander-in-Chief, Mediterranean Fleet in 1897 during which tour he hosted a visit to Malta by the Kaisar Wilhelm II. He was a supporter of improvements in gunnery and at this time experimented with a new type of salvo firing. He retired as a full admiral in 1899 and was appointed Knight Grand Cross of the Order of the Bath in the 1899 Birthday Honours.

In 1903 he served on the Royal Commission responsible for examining the conduct of the Second Boer War. Hopkins predicted the threat from Zeppelins as the threat of World War I approached and lobbied for investment in aerial defence. He died in 1916.

Military offices
Preceded by Sir William Graham	Third Naval Lord and Controller of the Navy; 1888–1892	Succeeded by John Fisher
Preceded by Sir George Watson	Commander-in-Chief, North America and West Indies Station; 1892–1895	Succeeded by James Erskine
Preceded by Sir Michael Culme-Seymour	Commander-in-Chief, Mediterranean Fleet; 1896–1899	Succeeded by Sir John Fisher
