= Rowley Lambert =

Vice-Admiral Rowley Lambert CB
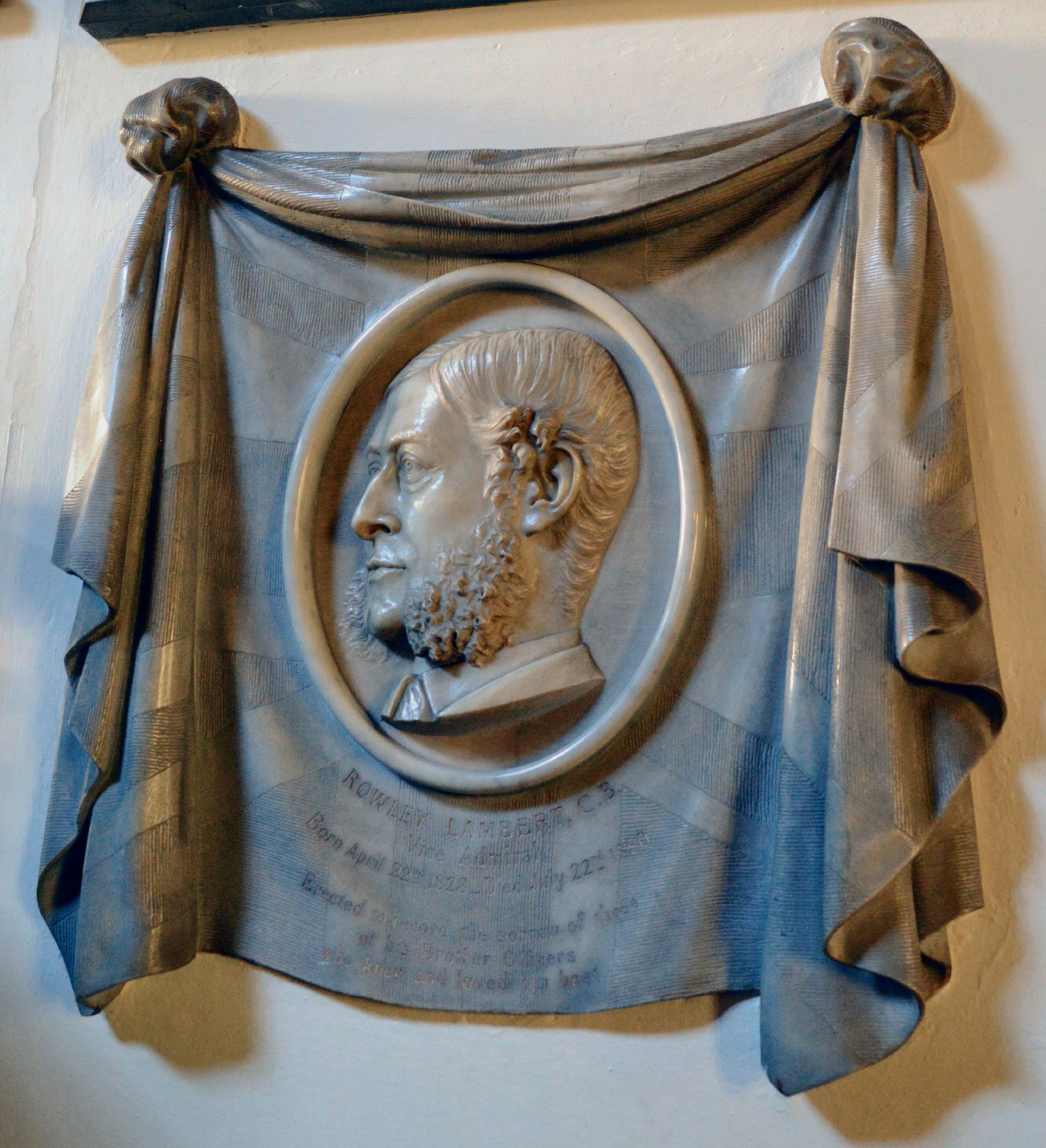
- Memorial in St Nicholas' Church, Thames Ditton
- Born: 23 April 1828
- Died: 22 July 1880 (aged 52) London, United Kingdom
- Allegiance: United Kingdom
- Branch: Royal Navy
- Rank: Vice-Admiral
- Commands: HMS Scylla; HMS Liverpool; Australia Station (1867–1870)
- Conflicts: Crimean War
- Awards: Companion of the Order of the Bath

Vice-Admiral Rowley Lambert, CB (23 April 1828 – 22 July 1880) was a senior officer in the Royal Navy.

== Naval career ==
Born the son of Admiral Sir George Lambert, Rowley was appointed a lieutenant in the Royal Navy in 1848. His service in command of HMS Fox during the Second Anglo-Burmese War and the capture of Pegu earned commendation from his senior officers Charles Shadwell and Admiral Lambert. Promoted to commander in 1853 and captain in 1855, he was given command of HMS Scylla and then HMS Liverpool.

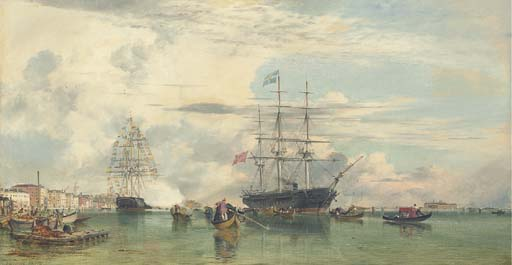
The arrival of the newly exiled Otho, ex-King of Greece, at Venice, 29 October, 1862, in the Scylla, Captain Rowley Lambert. Edward William Cooke

He served in the Black Sea during the Crimean War, aboard HMS Curlew and was mentioned in despatches. He was awarded the Legion of Honour Knight, 5th class and the Order of the Medjidie (5th class).

He was appointed a Companion of the Order of the Bath (CB) in 1867.

He was the Commander-in-Chief, Australia Station, between 28 May 1867 until 8 April 1870. During this time Lambert Peninsula in Pittwater, New South Wales was named after him in around 1868. He was appointed a rear-admiral in 1873, and vice-admiral in 1878. He died in London on 22 July 1880.

Military offices
Preceded by Rochfort Maguire	Commander-in-Chief, Australia Station; 1867–1870	Succeeded by Frederick Stirling
