= Frederick Stirling =

British Royal Navy admiral (1829–1885)

Vice-Admiral Frederick Stirling
- Born: 1829; At sea
- Died: November 1885 (aged 55–56); Brighton, East Sussex
- Military career
- Allegiance: United Kingdom
- Branch: Royal Navy
- Rank: Vice-Admiral
- Commands: HMS Warrior; HMS Clio; Australia Station (1870–1873); Pacific Station (1879–1881)
- Conflicts: Crimean War

Vice-Admiral Frederick Henry Stirling (1829 – November 1885) was a Royal Navy officer who served as Commander-in-Chief, Pacific Station. He was a son of Admiral Sir James Stirling, the first Governor of Western Australia and Ellen Mangles.

== Naval career ==
Having been born at sea on the barque Parmelia, off the Cape of Good Hope, Stirling was appointed a lieutenant in the Royal Navy in 1848. He went on to serve in the Black Sea during the Crimean War. Promoted to captain in 1860, he was given command of HMS Warrior and then HMS Clio. He was appointed Commander-in-Chief, Australia Squadron, in 1870 and Commander-in-Chief, Pacific Station, in 1879. He was promoted to rear-admiral in 1877, and to vice-admiral in 1882.

== See also ==
- O'Byrne, William Richard (1849). "Stirling, Frederick Henry" . A Naval Biographical Dictionary . John Murray – via Wikisource.

Military offices
Preceded by Rowley Lambert	Commander-in-Chief, Australia Station; 1870–1873	Succeeded by James Goodenough
Preceded by Sir Algernon de Horsey	Commander-in-Chief, Pacific Station; 1879–1881	Succeeded by Sir Algernon Lyons
