= George Lyon Tupman =

British astronomer

Lieutenant Colonel George Lyon Tupman FRAS
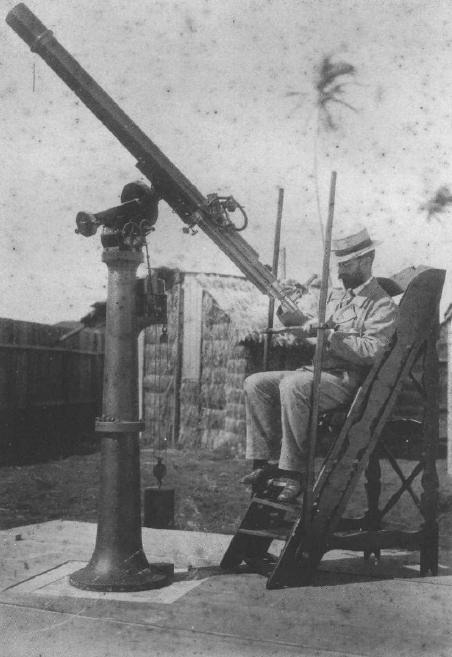
- Born: 7 September 1838; Boulogne, France
- Died: 3 November 1922 (aged 84)
- Education: Royal Naval School, New Cross
- Known for: Astronomy, particularly the 1874 Transit of Venus Expedition to Hawaii and measuring the velocity of meteors
- Spouse: Rebecca Gumbes Wetherill (married 1876)

George Lyon Tupman FRAS (7 September 1838 – 3 November 1922) was the Chief Astronomer for the British astronomical expedition to Hawaii to observe the 1874 transit of Venus.

== Early life ==
George, the eldest son of George Tupman (1785–1847) and Elizabeth Emerson, was born at Boulogne-sur-Mer on 7 September 1838 and was educated for eight and a half years at the Royal Naval School, where he showed an interest in mathematical and scientific subjects.

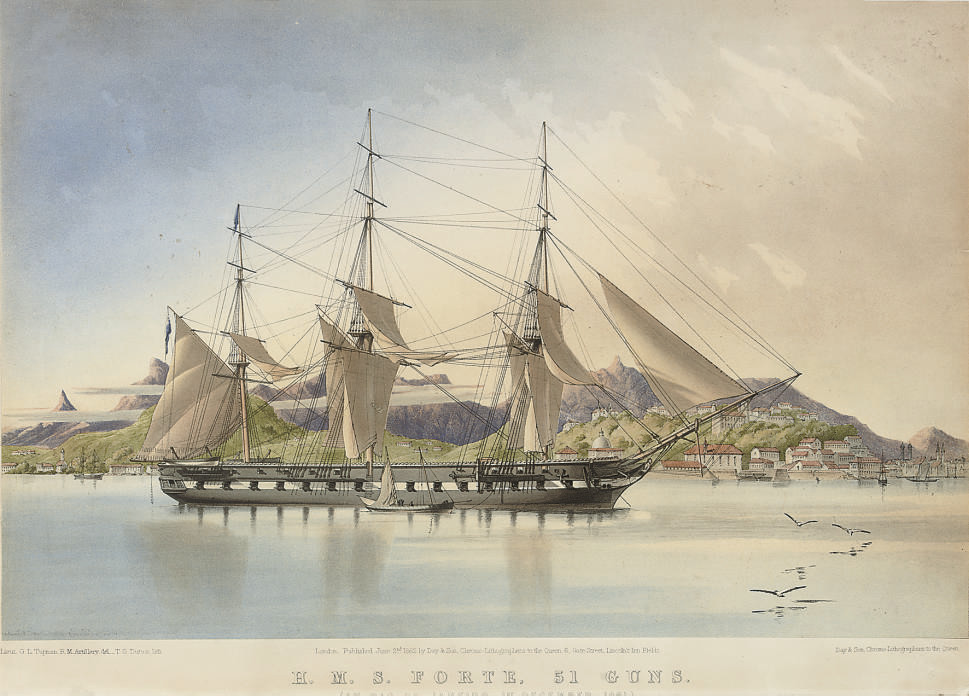
HMS Forte, at Rio de Janeiro, 1 December 1861. T.G. Dutton after Tupman

As an officer in the Royal Marine Artillery he served on H.M.S. Sidon at Rio and at the Cape and on H.M.S. Forte at Montevideo, then on H.M.S. Prince Consort in the Mediterranean. He kept an album from the 1850s, which includes his watercolour sketches of ships he sailed on and places he visited, that has been digitised.

Tupman was particularly interested in astronomy, and was a Fellow of the Royal Astronomical Society from May 1863. Whilst in the Mediterranean between 1869 and 1871 he observed about 300 meteor trails. He was one of the first people to make estimates of the velocity of meteors.

== Role in the 1874 Transit of Venus Expeditions ==
In 1872, on his return from sea, Tupman was assigned to assist with the British expeditions to observe the 1874 Transit of Venus, soon being appointed as head instructor. The Transit Expedition project was overseen by George Biddell Airy, but historian Jessica Ratcliff notes that Tupman was 'manager, observer and calculator' and that his involvement 'went deeper than Airy's.' Tupman oversaw recruitment and training of the team of observers (including with the use of a clockwork model), and organised the equipment and transport for all five official British expeditions. These were to Egypt, the Sandwich Islands, Rodriguez Island, New Zealand and Kerguelen Island. He went as chief astronomer on the Sandwich (Hawaiian) Islands expedition and observed the transit of Venus from the main station at Honolulu, as well as making many observations to determine longitude.

After returning to Greenwich, via a trans-continental rail journey across the US, he spent around four years working without pay on the data that had been collected on the five expeditions. Tupman's official journals for his time spend at Greenwich from 1872 to 1880 and his time at the Honolulu observing station, as well as his private journal for 1875, are available online.

Tupman (and his wife Rebecca, who he had married in 1876) observed the 1882 transit of Venus from Burnham near Christchurch, New Zealand.

== Later life ==
Tupman maintained his interest in astronomy, and reported numerous occultations between 1885 and 1900. He was on the Council of the Royal Astronomical Society (1873–1880), and was also appointed its Secretary (1884–1889). He also established the Hillfoot Observatory in Harrow, and enjoyed helping visitors to make observations.

Tupman's interests later in life included wireless telegraphy. He died at Observatory, College Road, Harrow, on 3 November 1922 at the age of 84, and was buried at Pinner Road Cemetery, Harrow. His wife Rebecca (née Wetherill), known as Beckie, survived him by only a few months.

== Legacy ==
Tupman published an Account of Observations of the Transit of Venus, 1874, 8 December: Made Under the Authority of the British Government: and of the Reduction of the Observations in 1881. He published other astronomical observations regularly in the Monthly Notices of the Royal Astronomical Society and elsewhere.

As well as a selection of Tupman's official and private papers relating to the Transit of Venus enterprise, the recent digital collection contains The Life & Adventures of Station B, two albums of caricatures by Lieutenant Evelyn Noble, one of the Honolulu observers. These include many drawings of Tupman and the other observers at work and leisure during their travels and while in Honolulu.
