= 1874 Transit of Venus Expedition to Hawaii =

1874 transit of Venus observed in Hawaii

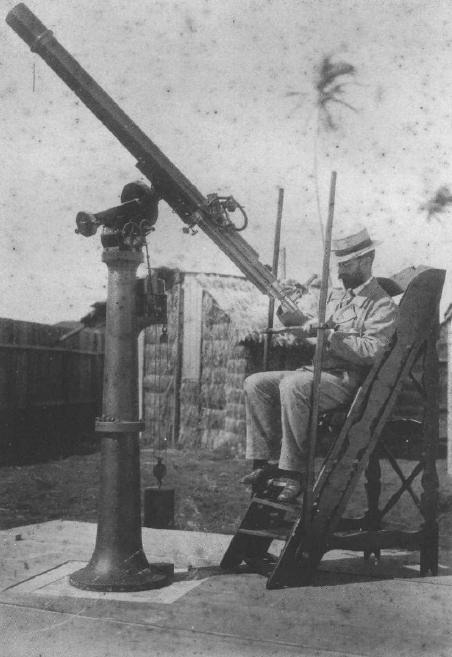
Expedition leader George Lyon Tupman at the telescope in Honolulu.

The 1874 Transit of Venus Expedition to Hawaii was an astronomical expedition by British scientists to observe the December 8 transit of Venus at three separate observing sites in the Hawaiian Islands, then known as the Sandwich Islands. It was one of five 1874 transit expeditions organized by George Biddell Airy, Astronomer Royal at the Royal Observatory, Greenwich. The purpose of the expedition was to obtain an accurate estimate of the astronomical unit (AU), the distance from the Earth to the Sun, by measuring solar parallax. Previous efforts to obtain a precise value of an AU in 1769 had been hampered by the black drop effect. There is a collection of papers relating to this expedition at the Cambridge Digital Library.

== Background ==
George Biddell Airy began preparations for the expedition in 1869 and procured funds in June of that year. Airy spent 1870–71 acquiring the necessary supplies and equipment. He made George Lyon Tupman, a captain in the Royal Marine Artillery, the lead astronomer of the Sandwich Islands expedition (known as Station B) in April 1872 and Tupman was also given responsibility for overseeing the organisation of all five official British expeditions and training the 22 observers. Tupman's journals recording the pre-expedition work at Greenwich have been digitised.

== Team ==
The Sandwich Islands team was composed of seven observers - Professor George Forbes, Henry Glanville Barnacle, John Walter Nichol, Lieutenant Francis Edward Ramsden, Lieutenant E. J. W. Noble, Captain George Lyon Tupman, and Richard Johnson - plus three Sappers of the Royal Engineers. In June 1874, the team left Liverpool in two groups carrying 93 tons of provisions on HMS Scout. They stopped along the way and met up in Valparaíso, Chile; they reached Honolulu Harbor on 9 September. The voyage out, and the rest of the expedition, were depicted in a series of caricature drawings by Lieutenant Noble, which have been digitised.

The team manned observing stations on three different islands. The primary observing station was established by George Lyon Tupman on the island of Oahu in the Apua district of Honolulu. The site was atop the bell tower of Kawaiaha`o Church. Nearby Ali`iolani Hale, at that time the Hawaiian Kingdom's capitol building, was a second Oahu location atop the building's clock tower manned by an American observer. Two auxiliary stations were established, one in Waimea, Kauai, manned by Richard Johnson with assistance from Lieutenant R.H. Wellings of HMS Scout, and another in Kailua, Hawaii, manned by George Forbes and Henry Glanville Barnacle.

As well as observing the transit on 8 December 1874, the observers undertook a large amount of work to establish the positions, particularly the longitudes, of the three observing sites. This information was fed into the Trigonometrical Survey of the Kingdom of Hawaii, then in progress and led by Professor William DeWitt Alexander. Tupman's journal of the Honolulu Station and Forbes's journal of the Kailua (Hawaii) Station have been digitised.

Charles Darwin's son, Leonard Darwin, was a photographer on the 1874 Transit of Venus Expedition to New Zealand, after which he traveled to Hawaii aboard the Mikado to meet the team in Honolulu.

== Publications ==
George Biddell Airy published an Account of Observations of the Transit of Venus in Hawaii in 1881, with more than 200 pages about the expedition.
