= George Forbes (scientist) =

Scottish engineer

George Forbes FRS FRSE FRAS
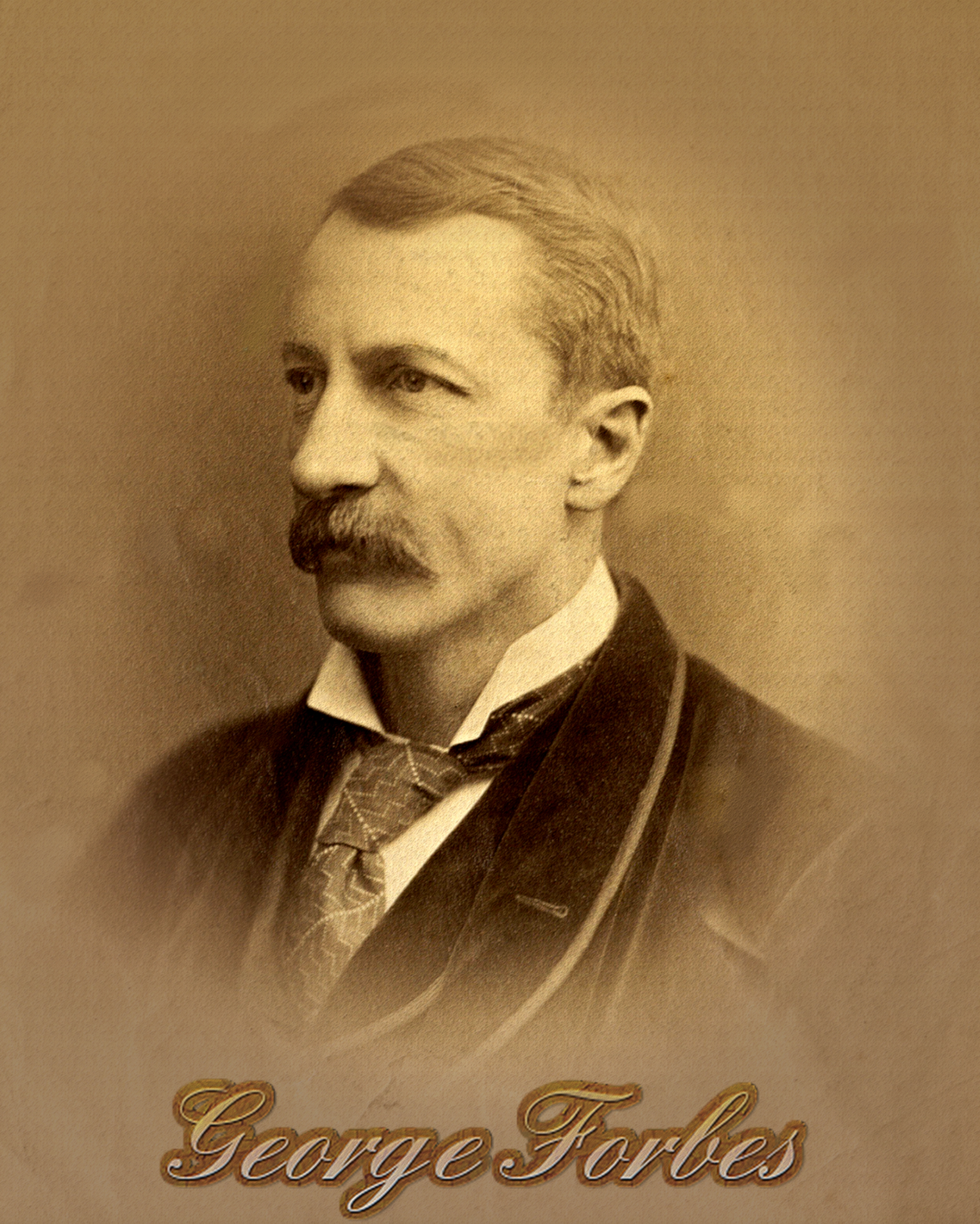
- Born: 5 April 1849; Edinburgh, Scotland
- Died: 22 October 1936 (aged 87); Worthing, England
- Education: University of St Andrews; Christ's College, Cambridge; St Catharine's College, Cambridge

George Forbes (5 April 1849 – 22 October 1936) was a Scottish electrical engineer, astronomer, explorer, author and inventor, some of whose inventions are still in use.

== Early life ==
Born at 3 Park Place in Edinburgh on 5 April 1849, Forbes was the second son of James David Forbes and Alicia Wauchope. His father was later Principal of St Andrews University. Forbes was educated at Edinburgh Academy, the University of St Andrews, Christ's College and St Catharine's College, Cambridge.

== Career ==
In 1873 he was appointed Professor of Natural Philosophy at Anderson's University, Glasgow, (the nucleus of the University of Strathclyde). In his lectures he advocated using electricity to power transportation. His main work at this time, however, was research into the velocity of light.

Arguably his most important work was as a supervising engineer for several pioneering hydroelectric schemes. From 1891 to 1895, Forbes was consulting engineer on the Niagara Falls hydroelectric scheme. He also advised on other schemes, in India (1893), South Africa (1895), New Zealand (1896) and Egypt (1898).

In 1880 Forbes resigned from Anderson's University and moved to London. For the next two decades he devoted himself to electrical power engineering. Commissioned to report on how the City and South London Railway should be powered, he recommended electricity. Soon the entire London Underground would follow his advice. In 1881 he served as a juror at the Paris Exposition Internationale d'Electricite. He was subsequently admitted to the French Legion of Honour.

In 1906 he built a home near Pitlochry to house his library. Forbes's family had frequently holidayed in Pitlochry and his father had befriended the Butters – the area's main landowners – who initially leased and eventually sold Forbes the land on which his house stood. This house, which he called The Shed was a large wooden structure with an observatory on the upper storey. It overlooks the valley that in the 1950s would be flooded to create Loch Faskally and the hydroelectric scheme Forbes had proposed in the early 1900s. In Pitlochry he returned to an earlier interest, from 1906 to 1930 delivering the David Elder lectures on Astronomy at the Royal Technical College in Glasgow.

== Astronomical expeditions and explorations ==
For the 1874 Transit of Venus, Forbes was lead astronomer at the Hawaiʻi sub-station, part of the larger expedition to the Sandwich Islands led by Captain George Lyon Tupman. He returned to Scotland via Peking and St Petersburg, crossing the Gobi desert and Siberia in 1875. Nearly 25 years later Forbes wrote up his overland odyssey – it was a journey that few seasoned western explorers had made, much less lone travellers in their mid-20s. With contacts made on this journey, Forbes was able to become the only British war correspondent with the Russian army in the Russo-Turkish war of 1877, reporting for The Times. He received the Russian Order of St George for this work.

He wrote and lectured widely about astronomy for professional and popular audiences. He predicted the existence of a trans-Neptunian planet fifty years before the discovery of Pluto.

In 1880, George Forbes was the first to postulate the existence of trans-Neptunian planets that were somewhat similar to the hypothetical Planet Nine in the far outer Solar System. In his model the planet had a semi-major axis of ~300 AU, and he based locations from clustering of the aphelion distances of periodic comets.

== Inventions ==
In 1882, Forbes became manager of the British Electric Light Company, manufacturers of carbon filaments and arc lamps. He experimented with using carbon for the brushes in electric motors, rather than wire or gauze and in 1885 took out a patent for the Improved Means for Establishing Electric Connection between Surfaces in Relative Motion Applicable to the Collectors of Dynamo Machines. This advocated carbon as a current collector for rotating electrical machines. The invention would prove outstandingly successful and it is in universal use in electricity generation to this day. He could have become a rich man with such an innovation but he sold his American patent rights to Westinghouse Electric for £2,000. There is no evidence that he received any UK royalties. In the obituary published in the Proceedings of the Philosophical Society, G. L. Addenbroke wrote that 'Forbes always referred to this work with much modesty, but there can be no doubt that, he presented to the World an idea of great engineering and commercial value, the importance of which he does not seem to have fully grasped at the time.' For another take on Forbes's "modesty" see Blackwood's Magazine, Vol. CLVIII, Pg. 430.

After the turn of the century, Forbes turned to military work, studying techniques of gunnery. Between 1903 and 1906 working with the Admiralty he developed a rangefinder that was still in use by the Navy at the outset of the Second World War. During the First World War he was involved in devising methods of signalling for submarines.

== Honours and awards ==
Forbes was elected a Fellow of the Royal Society in 1887. He was also Fellow of the Royal Society of Edinburgh, Fellow of the Royal Astronomical Society, MInstCE and Member of the Vienna Astronomisches Verein. Forbes was elected a Member of the Institution of Electrical Engineers, the American Philosophical Society, and received an honorary LLD from St Andrews.

The University of Strathclyde honoured his memory in 1987 by naming a new student hall of residence after him.

In 2021 he was inducted into the Scottish Engineering Hall of Fame.

== Later life ==
Forbes did not marry and, in his last years, became something of a recluse, disillusioned that his obvious talents had earned him neither fame nor fortune. He lived in increasing poverty, though in 1928 friends did successfully petition a variety of organisations for assistance on his behalf. Until close to the end of his life, Pitlochry was his home. Eventually, however, friends insisted that he move south where he could be more easily cared for. He died in an accident at his home in Worthing on 22 October 1936.

George Forbes was described in his obituaries as a man with a "stern code of honour" who "thought much of his work and little of his reward". A friend, the engineer Samuel Mavor, was more effusive: for him, Forbes "was the best type of Scottish gentleman, of tall and handsome appearance... he had a singularly attractive personality, fine character, a brilliant intellect and the manners of a courtier."

== Publications ==
Forbes published throughout his life. Titles include The Transit of Venus (1874), Lectures on Electricity (1888) and Alternating and Interrupted Electric Currents (1895). Once he settled in Pitlochry, his output became prolific: History of Astronomy (1909) Star Talks to Boy Scouts (1911), David Gill, Man and Astronomer (1916) and The Wonder and the Glory of the Stars (1926), and numerous contributions to learned journals were all produced during this time.
