= HMS Clio (1858) =

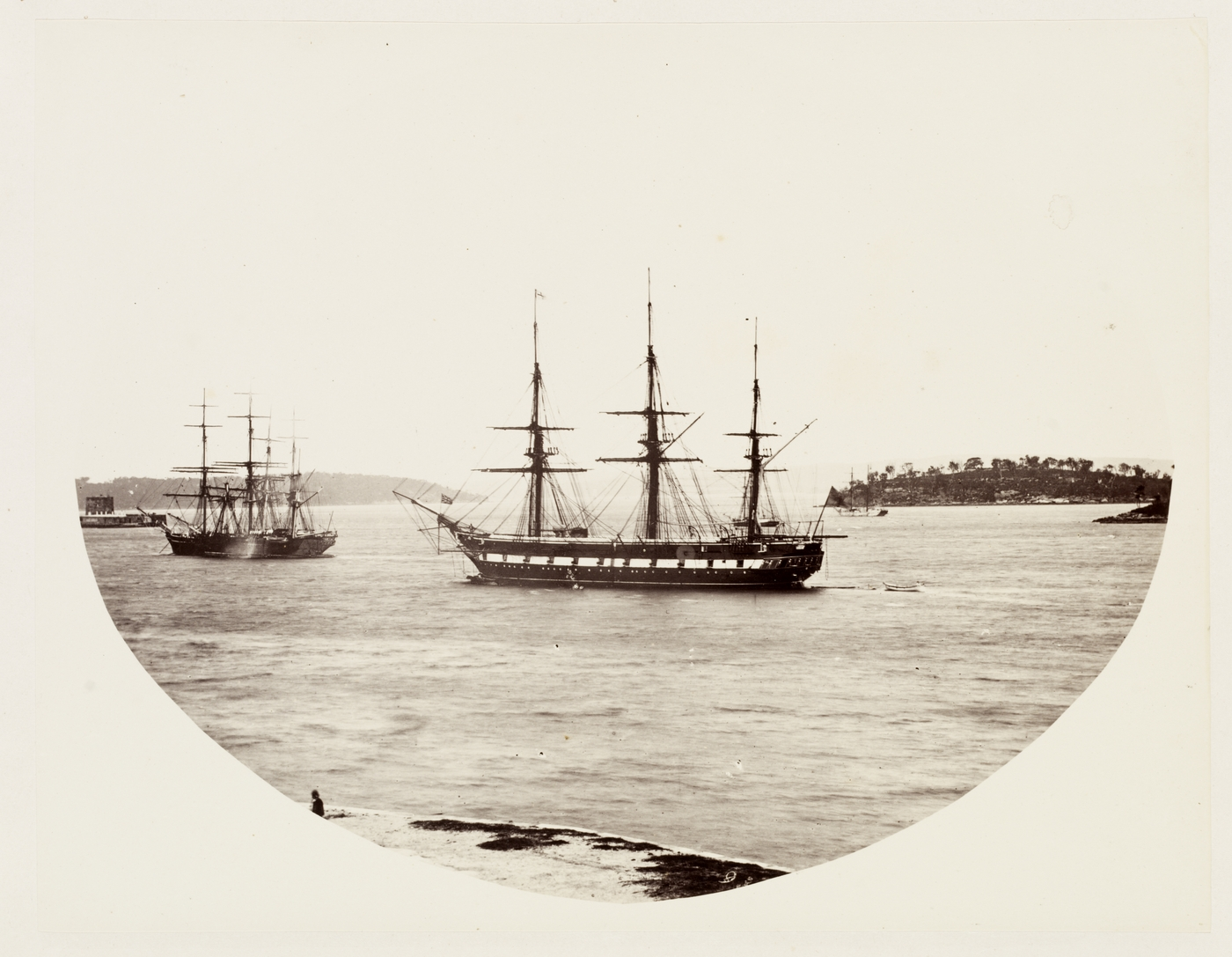
- HMS Clio at Anchor in Farm Cove, New South Wales, 1872

History

United Kingdom
- Name: HMS Clio
- Builder: Sheerness Dockyard
- Launched: 28 August 1858
- Decommissioned: 1876
- Fate: Scrapped at Bangor in 1919

General characteristics
- Class & type: Pearl-class corvette
- Displacement: 2,153 long tons (2,188 t)
- Tons burthen: 1458 bm
- Length: 225 ft 3 in (68.66 m) oa; 200 ft (61 m) (gundeck)
- Beam: 40 ft 4 in (12.29 m)
- Draught: 17 ft 6 in (5.33 m) (forward); 18 ft 10 in (5.74 m) (aft)
- Depth of hold: 23 ft 11 in (7.29 m)
- Installed power: 400 nominal horsepower; 1,540 ihp (1,150 kW)
- Propulsion: 2-cyl. horizontal single expansion; Single screw
- Sail plan: Full-rigged ship
- Speed: 11.2 knots (20.7 km/h) (under steam)
- Armament: 20 × 8-inch (42cwt) muzzle-loading smoothbore cannons on broadside trucks; 1 × 10-inch/68pdr (95cwt) muzzle-loading smoothbore cannons pivot-mounted at bow

HMS Clio was a wooden 22-gun Pearl-class corvette, built at Sheerness Dockyard and launched on 28 August 1858. She was the flagship of the Australia Station between 3 September 1870 and 16 October 1873, and from 1876 was used as a school ship.

Her first commission was on the Pacific Station and in 1860 she protected Panama City and the French citizens living within the city. While in the Pacific she was dismasted in bad weather. She returned to England and placed in reserve. Under the command of Commodore Frederick Stirling, she became the flagship of the Australia Station on 3 September 1870. In 1871, she was holed after striking an uncharted rock in Bligh Sound and was beached to prevent sinking. HMS Virago provided assistance and made temporary repairs enabling the ships the sail to Wellington, where she was repaired, prior to sailing to Sydney to be dry docked.

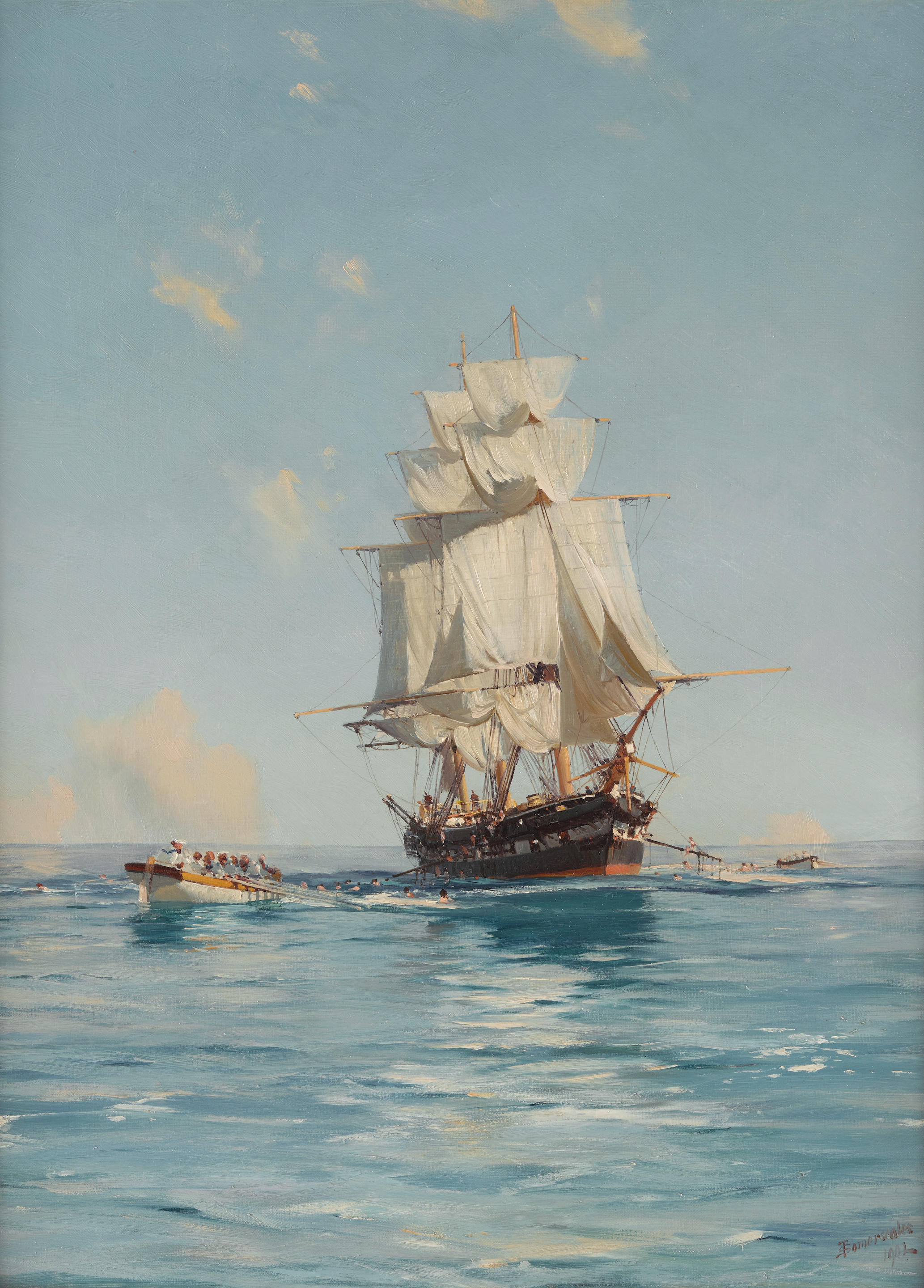
Clio, by the marine artist Thomas Somerscales. Somerscales served on board in the late 1860s.

She transferred the pennant of flagship to HMS Pearl and sailed for Portsmouth on 16 October 1873. In 1877 she became a school ship, stationed on the Menai Strait at Bangor, and had 260 pupils. She was sold for scrap and broken up in 1919.

In 1865, she sailed to Honolulu and escorted Queen Dowager Emma of the Hawaiian Kingdom to Panama for her trip to the United Kingdom.
