= HMS Scout (1856) =

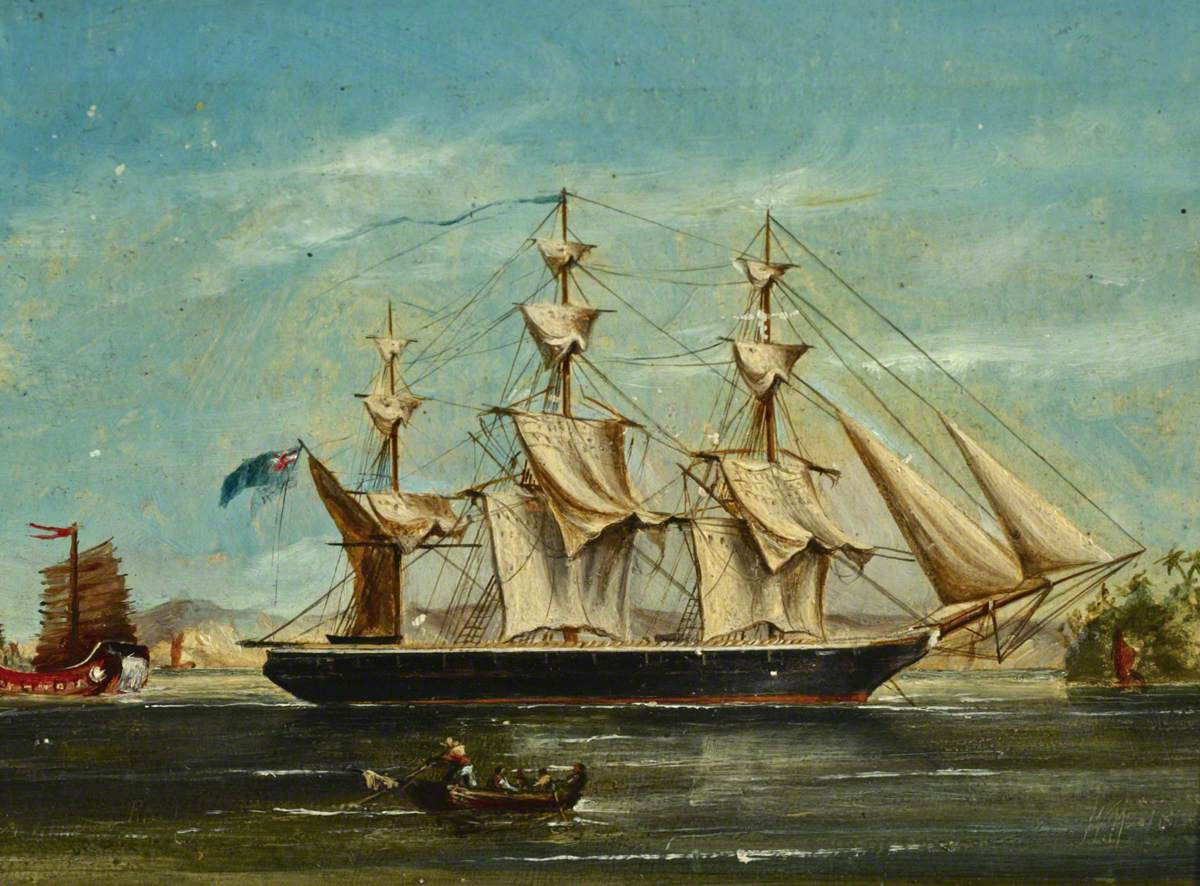
- Scout

History

United Kingdom
- Name: Scout
- Launched: 30 December 1856
- Out of service: 1875
- Fate: Broken up 6 March 1877

General characteristics
- Class & type: Pearl-class corvette
- Tonnage: 2187 tons
- Length: 200 ft (61 m)
- Propulsion: Screw
- Armament: 21

HMS Scout was a Pearl-class corvette in service 1857–77.

HMS Scout, 1877(?)

== Service ==
HMS Scout was a wooden screw corvette launched on 30 December 1856 at Woolwich Dockyard. She struck an uncharted rock in the Pacific Ocean on 12 August 1866. Repairs cost £1,087. A Court of Enquiry acquitted her commander.

In June 1874, captained by Ralph Cator, she sailed from Liverpool as part of a scientific expedition to Hawaiʻi. Carrying 93 tons of supplies, she journeyed via Valparaíso, Chile before reaching Honolulu Harbor in September of that year.

She was broken up in 1877.
