= Pearl-class corvette =

1855 class of British corvettes

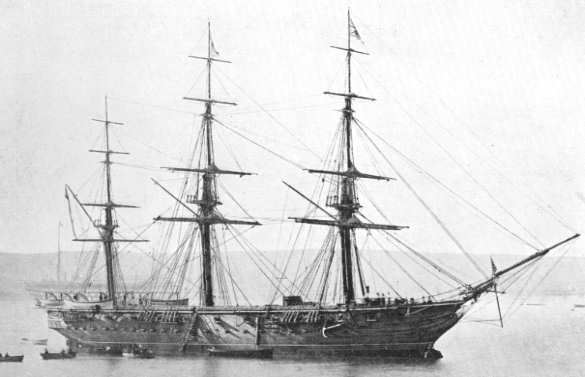
- An example of a Pearl-class ship

Class overview
- Name: Pearl class
- Operators: Royal Navy
- Preceded by: Cossack class
- Succeeded by: Jason class
- Completed: 10
- Retired: 10

General characteristics
- Type: Corvette
- Displacement: 1,965 tons
- Length: 200 ft (61 m)
- Propulsion: Screw
- Armament: 20 guns

The Pearl-class corvettes were a group of ten screw-driven ships built in England from 1855 through 1865. Units of the class saw action in the Crimean War, but they were regarded as mediocre.

== History ==
In 1856 Sir Baldwin Wake Walker submitted a ship design featuring a light deck supporting pivot guns disposed fore and aft. HMS Pearl, the first Pearl-class corvette to be built, reflected this design, followed by Challenger, Racoon and Clio.

== Ships ==
- HMS Clio (1858)
- HMS Challenger (1858)
- HMS Charybdis (1859)
- HMS Cadmus (1856)
- HMS Racoon (1857)
- HMS Satellite (1855)
- HMS Scout (1856)
- HMS Scylla (1856)
- HMS Pearl (1855)
- HMS Pelorus (1857)
