= HMS Racoon (1857) =

Wood steam corvette

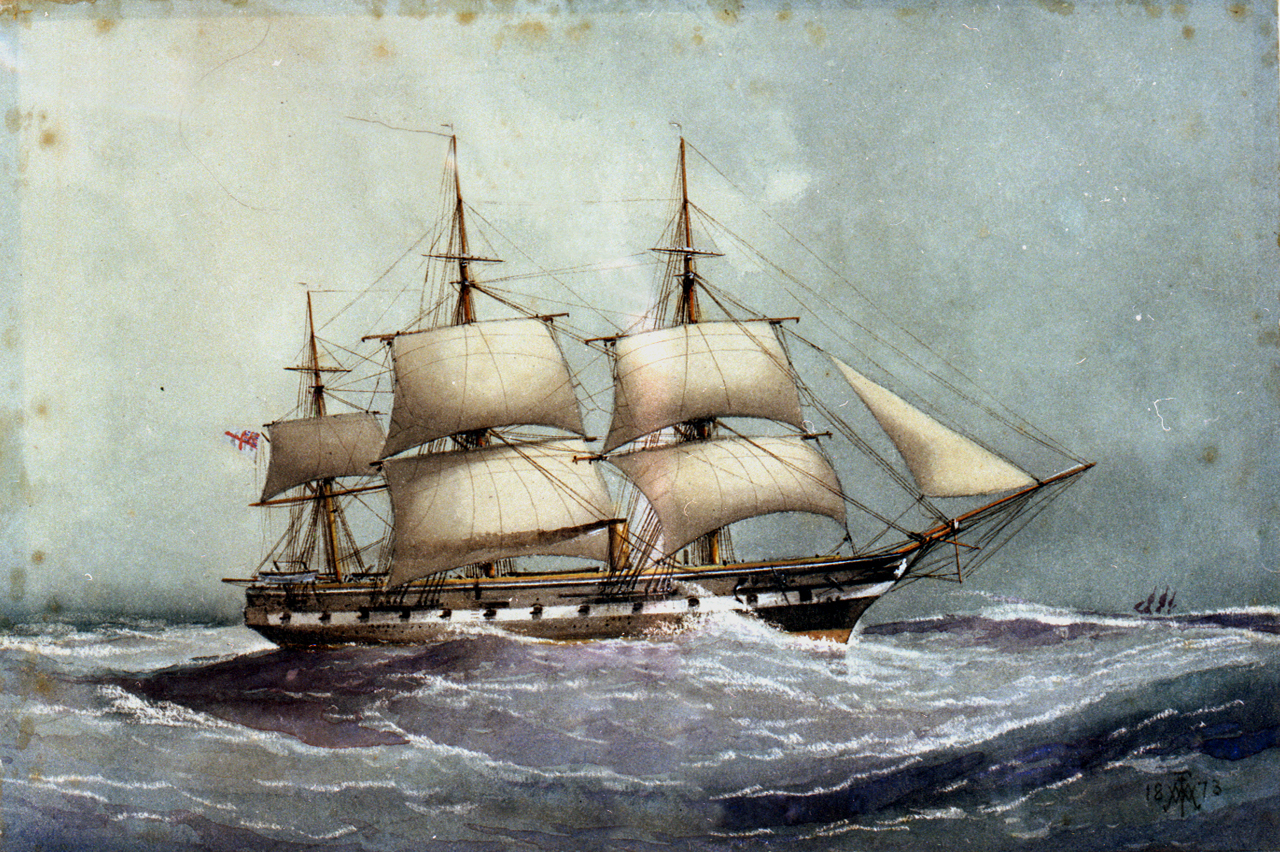
- Racoon, by William Frederick Mitchell, 1873

History

United Kingdom
- Name: HMS Racoon
- Namesake: Racoon
- Launched: 25 April 1857
- Out of service: 1877
- Fate: Broken up in 1877

General characteristics
- Class & type: Pearl-class steam corvette
- Tons burthen: 1,467 tons
- Length: 200 ft
- Armament: 21

HMS Racoon was a Pearl-class steam corvette.

== History ==
Racoon was launched on 25 April 1857 at Chatham Dockyard. In July 1863 she ran aground in Loch Ness and was damaged. She was repaired at Portsmouth, Hampshire. In May 1874, Racoon ran aground at Barbados. Racoon was broken up in 1877 at Devonport, Plymouth.

Prince Alfred was promoted to lieutenant on 24 February 1863, and served under Count Gleichen on the corvette.

== Gallery ==
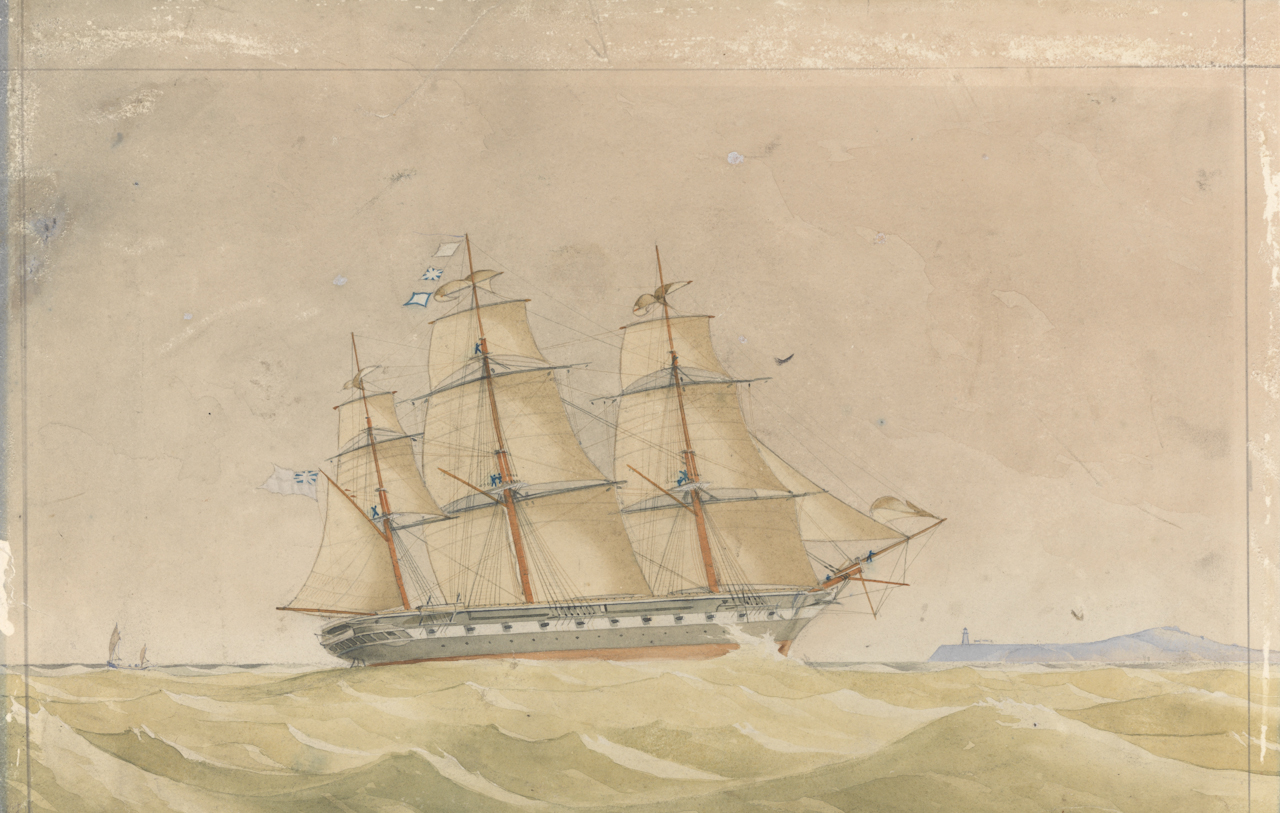
Racoon, by George Pechell Mends

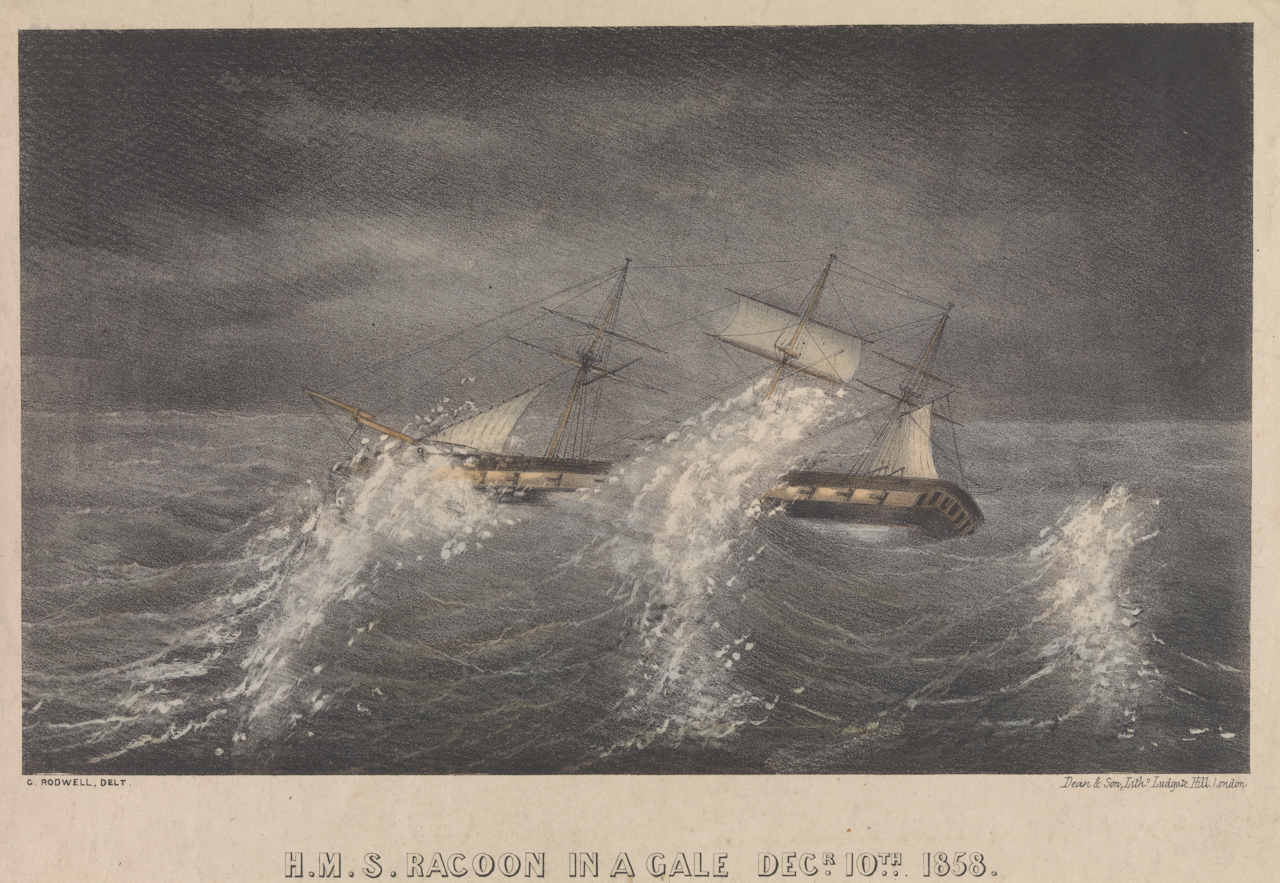
Racoon in a gale, 10 December 1858

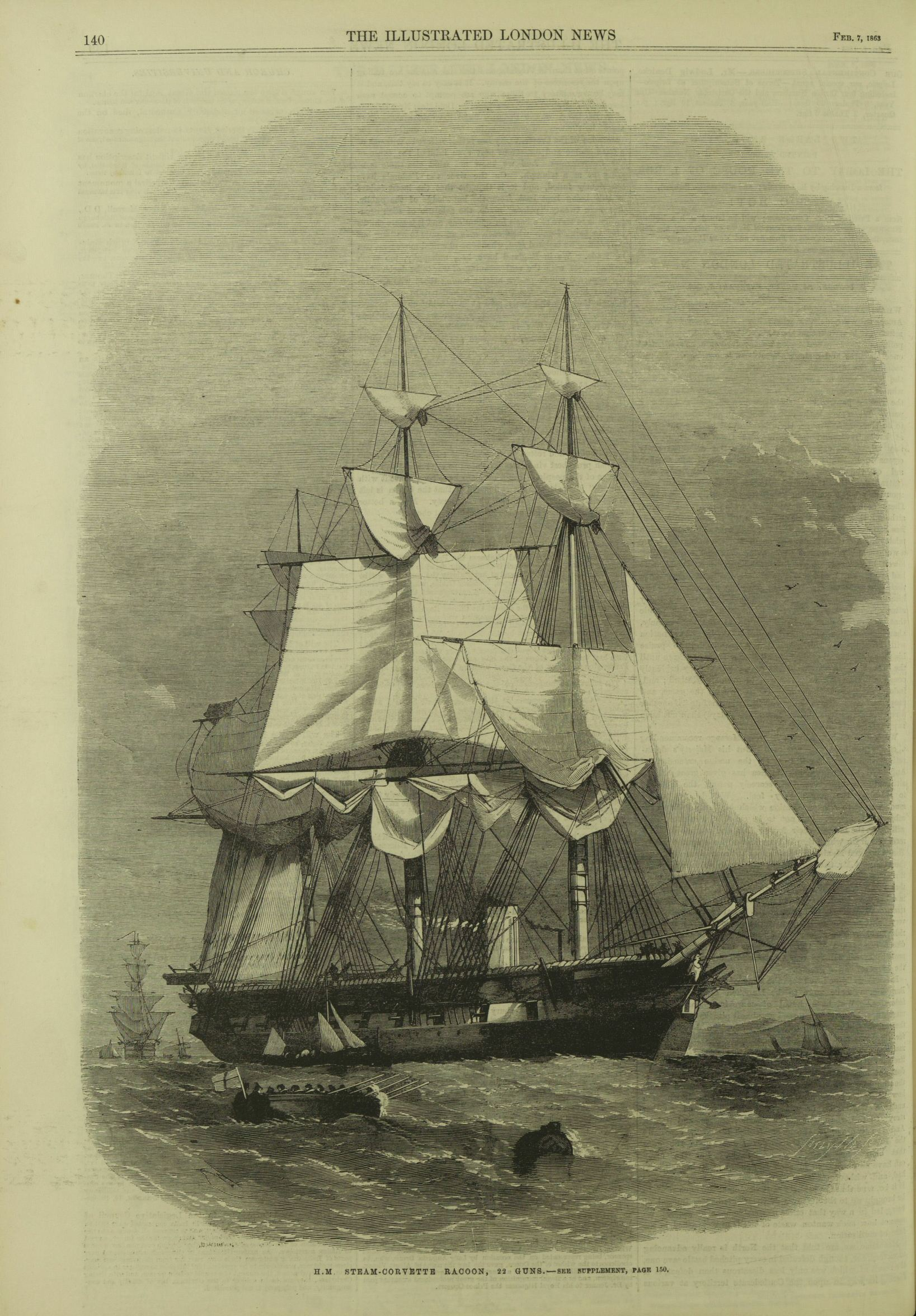
HM Steam-Corvette Racoon, 22 Guns, 1863. Fitted out for Prince Alfred's arrival.
