= HMS Liverpool (1860) =

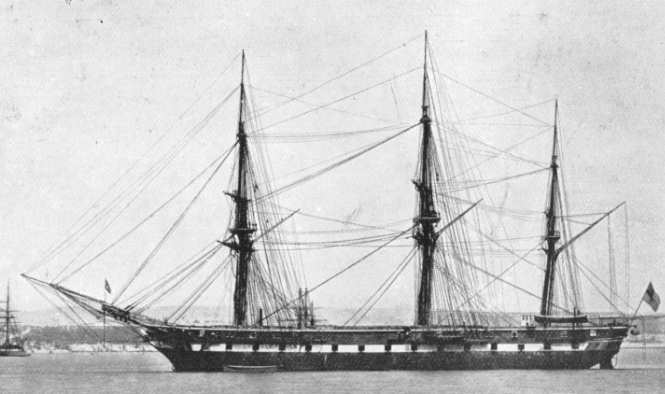
- HMS Liverpool at anchor

History

United Kingdom
- Name: HMS Liverpool
- Namesake: Liverpool
- Builder: Devonport Dockyard
- Laid down: 14 November 1859
- Launched: 30 October 1860
- Completed: April 1863
- Fate: Sold for breaking up 26 June 1875

General characteristics
- Class & type: Liffey-class frigate
- Displacement: 3,915 long tons (3,978 t)
- Tons burthen: 2656
- Length: 285 ft (86.9 m) o.a.
- Beam: 50 ft 1.5 in (15.3 m)
- Installed power: 1,935 ihp (1,443 kW)
- Propulsion: 1 shaft, 1 Steam engine
- Speed: 10 knots (19 km/h; 12 mph)
- Armament: 26 × 8-inch (203 mm) muzzle-loading smoothbore guns; 8 × 64-pounder muzzle-loading smoothbore guns; 4 × 7-inch (178 mm) guns

HMS Liverpool was a fourth-rate frigate of the Royal Navy.

== History ==
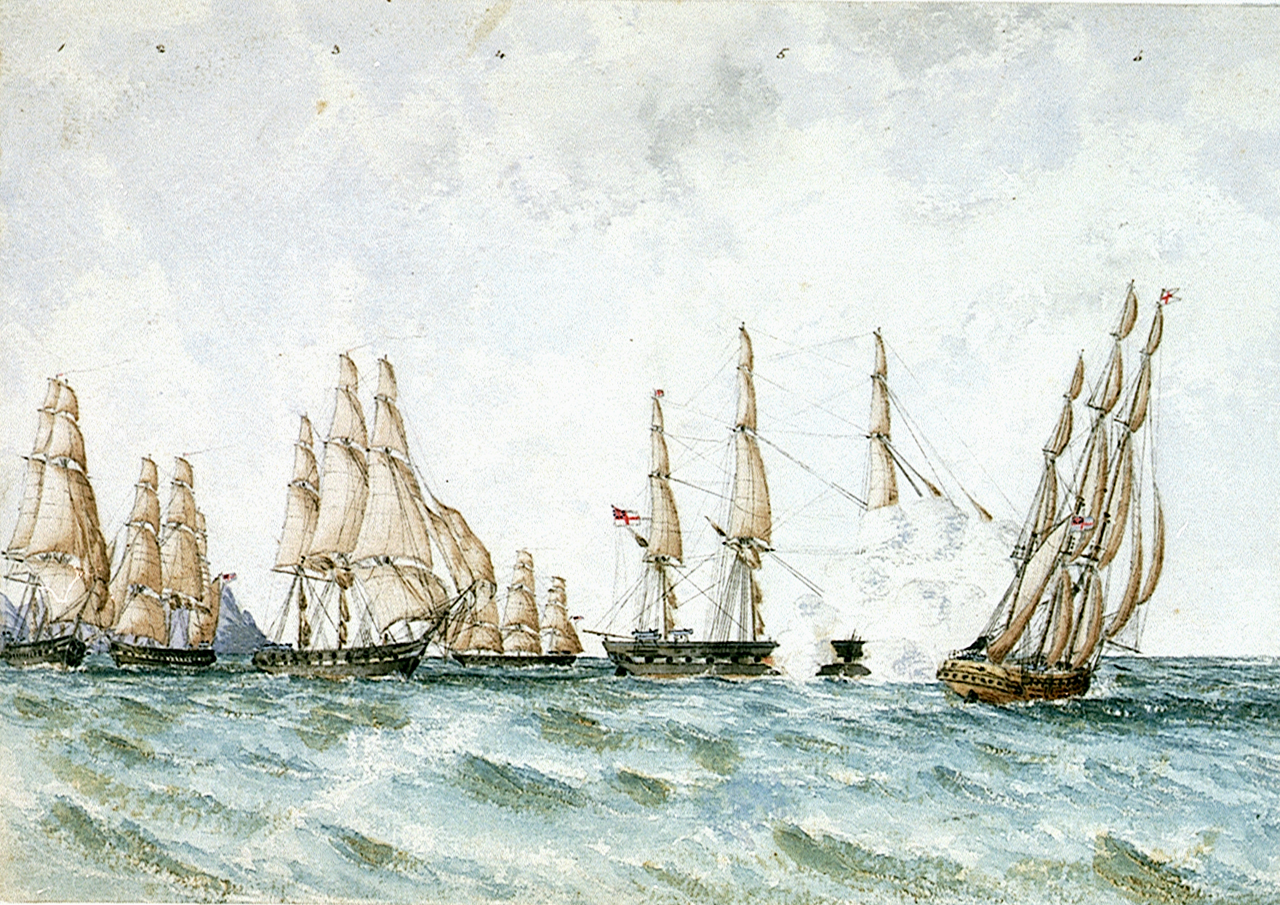
Departure of the Flying Squadron from Simon's Bay HMS Liverpool saluting Sir Philip Wodehouse on board HMS Rattlesnake, 1860

Liverpool was ordered on 31 March 1855, but building did not commence until 14 November 1859 and she was launched at Devonport Dockyard on 30 October 1860, in the same year that the famous iron-hulled Warrior was launched.

During her first commission, she served in the North America and West Indies Stations and later the Channel Squadron. In June 1864, she ran aground off Santo Domingo. She was refloated and ordered back to England for repairs. She was placed in "Steam Reserve" at Devonport in August 1867.

Like previous ships of the same name, she was re-commissioned on 8 May 1869 as flagship of the Special Flying Squadron, under Rear Admiral Geoffrey Hornby. The squadron's mission was an early form of "flag waving" to display British naval power and prowess across the world. The "Flying Squadron" consisted of HM ships Barrosa, Endymion, Liffey, Liverpool, Phoebe, and Scylla. The squadron left Portsmouth on 18 July 1869, circumnavigated the globe, and returned in November 1870, having sailed 53,000 miles. Liverpool was paid off into reserve in December of the year she returned. She was subsequently declared obsolete in 1872 and was sold for breaking up on 26 June 1875.

== Bibliography ==
- "Various British Screw Frigates". Warship International. V (4). Naval Records Club: 323. 1968.
- Jones, Colin (1996). "Entente Cordiale, 1865". In McLean, David & Preston, Antony (eds.). Warship 1996. London: Conway Maritime Press. ISBN 0-85177-685-X.
