= HMS Scylla (1856) =

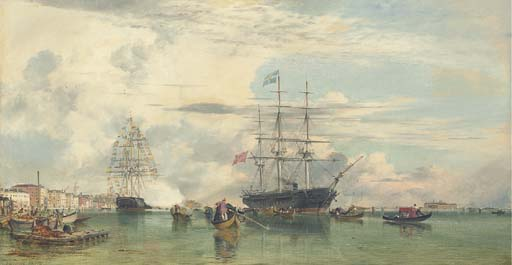
- The arrival of the newly exiled Otho, ex-King of Greece, at Venice, 29 October 1862, in the Scylla, Captain Rowley Lambert. Edward William Cooke

History

United Kingdom
- Name: HMS Scylla
- Launched: 19 June 1856
- Out of service: 1873
- Fate: Broken up 1882

General characteristics
- Class & type: Pearl-class corvette
- Displacement: 2189 tons
- Length: 200 ft (61 m)
- Propulsion: Screw
- Armament: 21 cannons

HMS Scylla was a wooden screw corvette launched at Sheerness Dockyard in 1856 and sold for breakup in 1882. She served in the Mediterranean from 1859 to 1863 and China from 1863 to 1867. In 1869 she joined the Flying Squadron, and then she was then deployed to the Pacific until 1873. She was broken up in 1882.

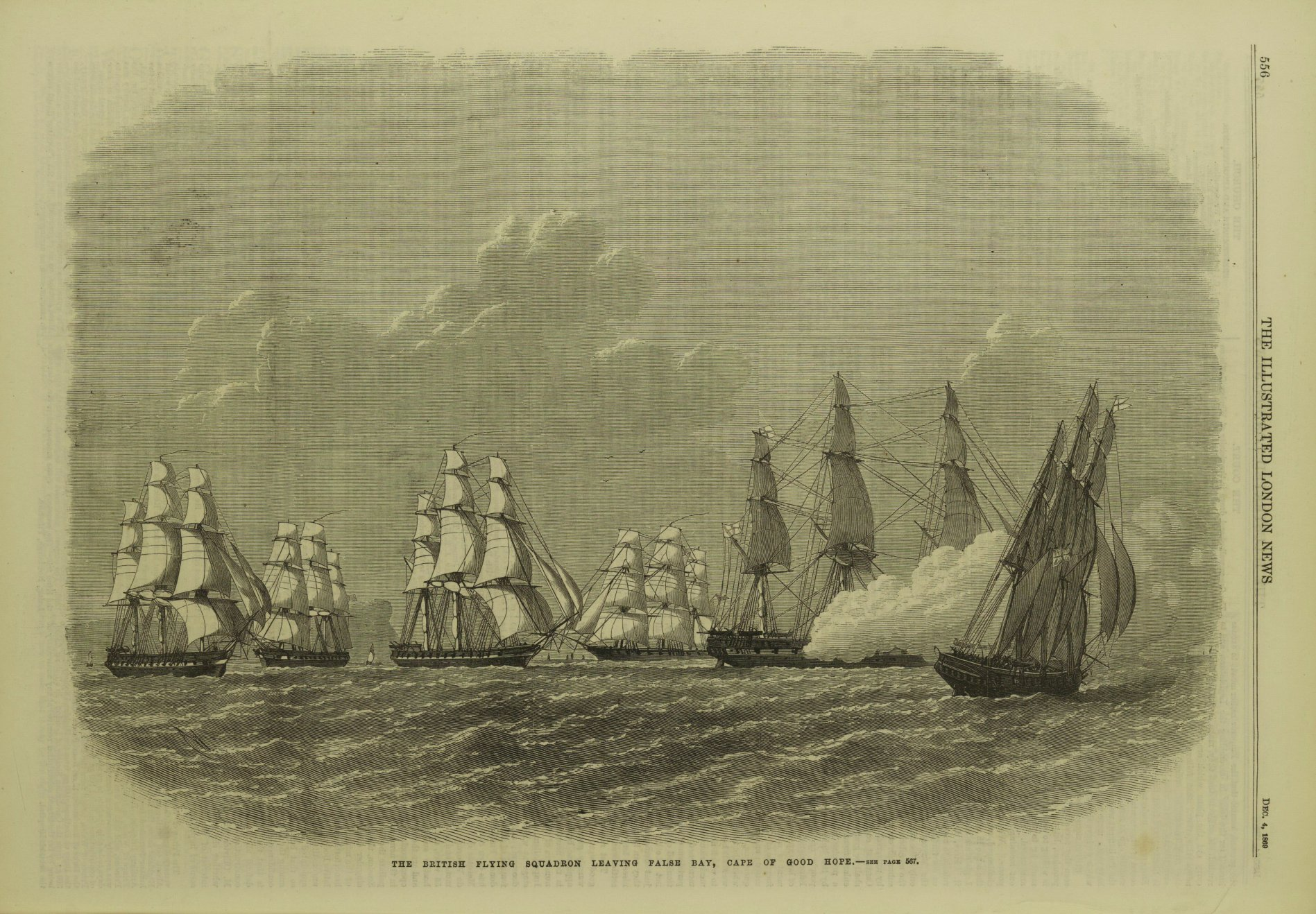
Scylla and the British Flying Squadron leaving False Bay, Cape of Good Hope on 18 October 1869
